= Pharaoh in Islam =

Character in the story of Moses

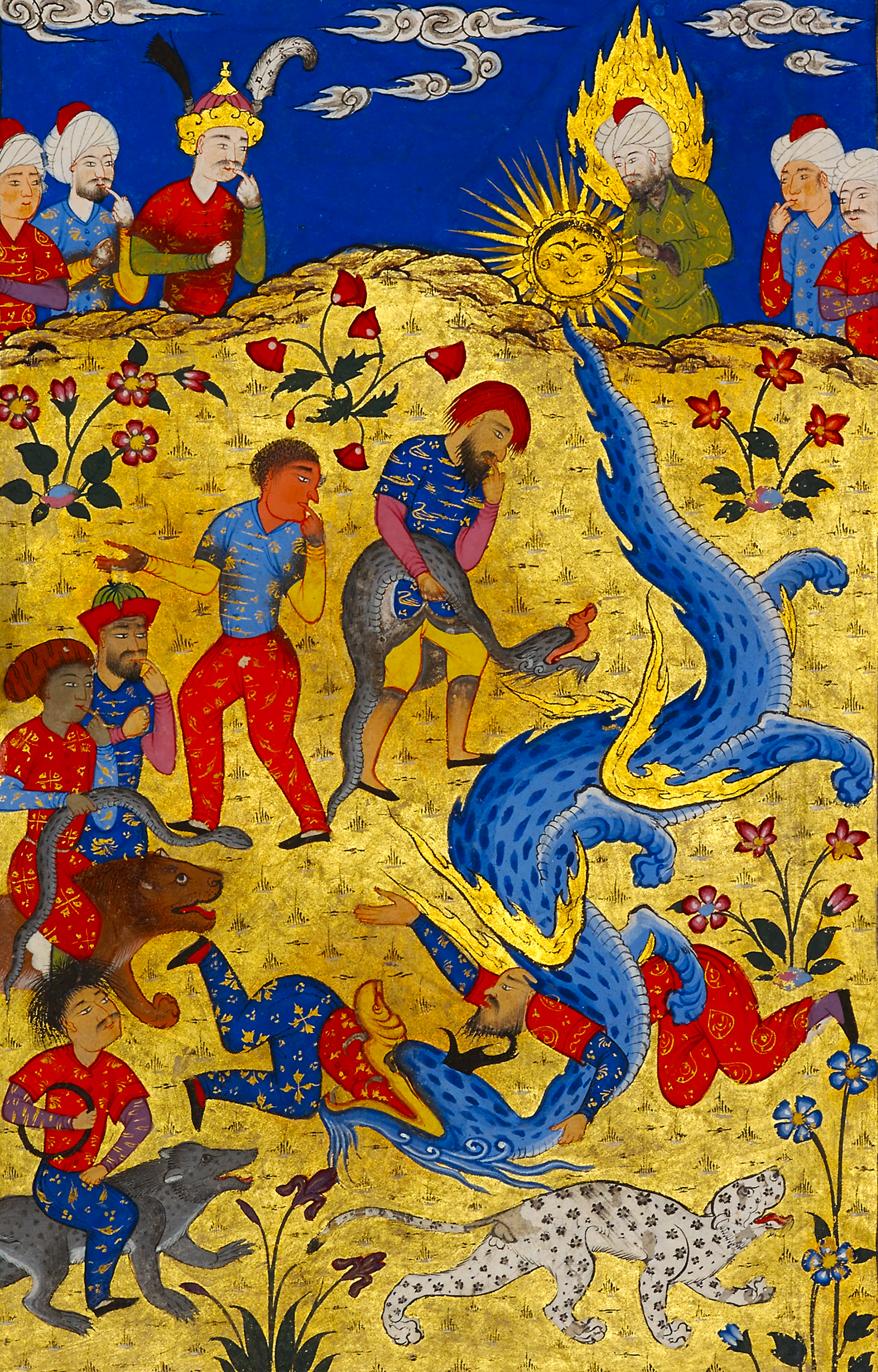
Islamic depiction of Fir'awn watching a dragon summoned from a staff by Musa devour one of his sorcerers

The story of Musa (Moses) includes his interaction with the ruler of Egypt, called Pharaoh (Arabic: فرعون, romanized: Fir'awn). The earlier story of Yusuf (Joseph) refers to the Egyptian ruler as a king (Arabic: ملك, romanized: Malik). The story of Pharaoh is revealed in various passages throughout the Qur'an. He is first mentioned in Q2:49:

۝Remember when we delivered you from the people of Pharaoh, who grievously oppressed you, they slew your male children, and let your females live: Therein was a great trial from your Lord.

In the Qur'an, Pharaoh drowned, but God said that he preserved the pharaoh's body as an example for generations to come (or made an example for coming generations). Pharaoh is last mentioned in 89:10.

== Islamic literature ==
Mohammad Asad in his commentary on Quran "The message of the Qur'an" reports that pharaoh and Haman were the titles of king of Egypt and high priest of Amon of the kingdom respectively at both Moses' birth story and at the Exodus of Egypt story 80 years later. Islamic literature states when the Awshaf is informed that one of the male children would grow up to overthrow him, he orders the killing of all newborn Israelite males in order to prevent the prediction from occurring. Pharaoh's court advised him this would result in loss of manpower. Therefore, they suggest that male infants should be killed in one year but spared the next. Musa's (Moses') brother, Harun, was born in the year when infants were spared, while Musa was born in the year when infants were to be killed. In 89:5-13 Unbelievers are warned by the fate of Ád, Thamúd, and Pharaoh.

When Moses ('Musa') and Aaron ('Harun') arrive in court of Pharaoh, the Pharaoh begins questioning Musa about the God he follows. The Quran narrates Musa, answering the Pharaoh:

۝He answered, our Lord is he who giveth all things: He hath created them, and directed them by his providence
۝Pharaoh said, what therefore is the condition of the former generations

and Musa answers that knowledge of the previous generations is with God.

The Quran also mentions the Pharaoh questioning Musa:

۝ Pharaoh said, and who is the Lord of all creatures

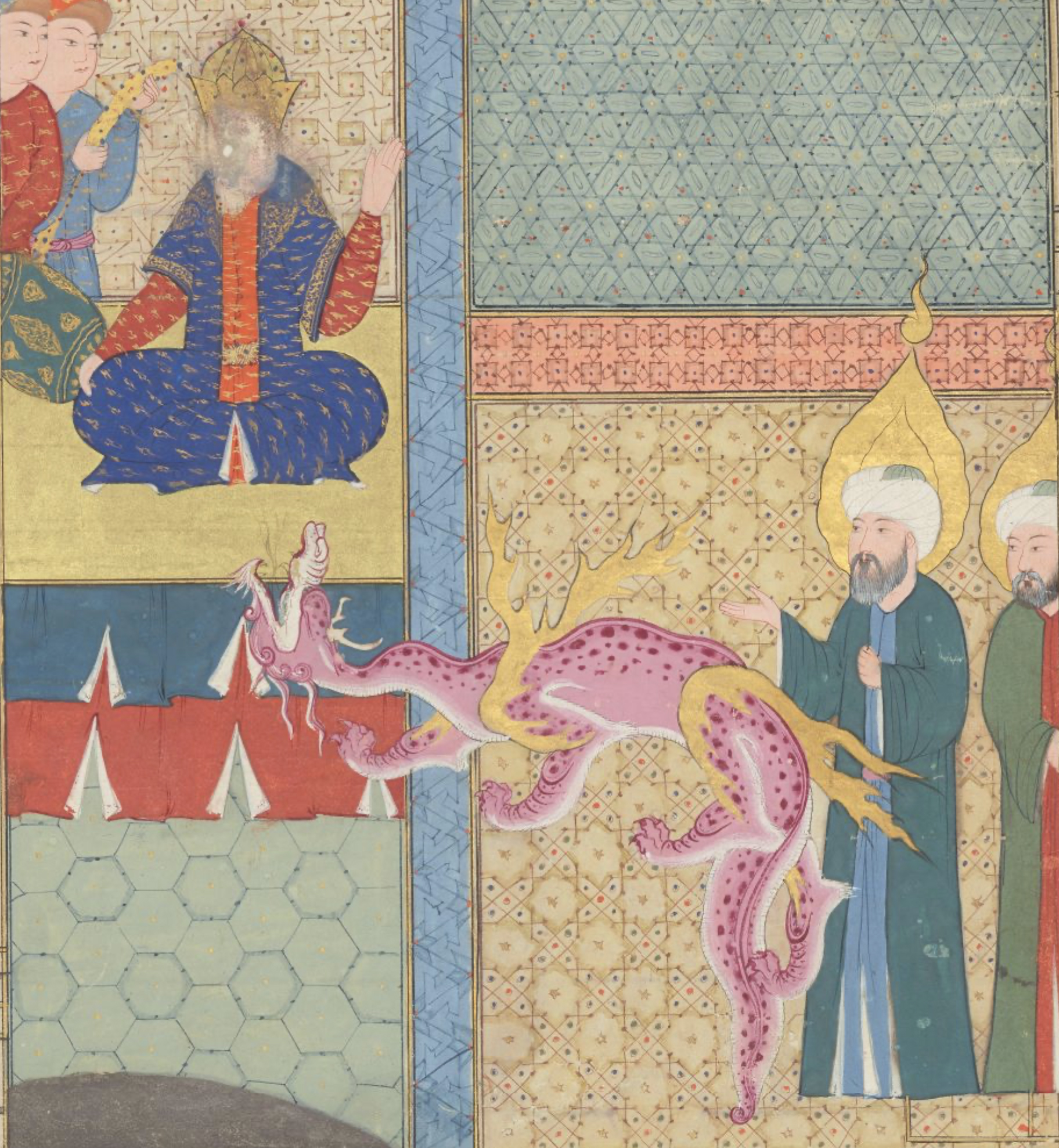
Pharaoh and his sorcerers are attacked by the dragon summoned by Musa with help of his brother Harun

Musa replies that God is the lord of the heavens, the earth and what is between them. The Pharaoh then reminds Musa of his childhood with them and the killing of the man he has done. Musa admits that he has committed the deed in ignorance, but insists that he is now forgiven and guided by God. Pharaoh accuses him of being mad and threatens to imprison him if he continues to proclaim that the Pharaoh is not the true god. Musa informs him that he has come with manifest signs from God. When the Pharaoh demands to see the signs, Musa throws his staff to the floor, and it turns into a serpent. He then draws out his hand, and it shines a bright white light. The Pharaoh's counselors advise him that this is sorcery, and on their advice he summons the best sorcerers in the kingdom. The Pharaoh challenges Musa to a battle between him and the Pharaoh's magicians, asking him to choose the day. Musa chose the day of a festival.

In literature, the Pharaoh becomes, due to the Pharaoh's self-deification and stubborn refusal to accept Moses' invitation to Islam, a symbol of nafs (the egoistic desire) or the Devil. In this context, Moses' staff is also invoked. Again, the serpent is a symbol of lower desires, but is transformed into something useful, just as the nafs needs to be made obedient and then transformed into something good.

== Quranic references ==
- Moses' life inside the palace:

۝ And when they had delivered their message, Pharaoh answered, have we not brought thee up among us, when a child; and hast thou not dwelt among us for several years of thy life

- 28:7-8 Pharaoh's family take up the infant Moses

- 9-10 The anxiety of Moses's mother—his sister watches him
- 11-12 Moses refuses the Egyptian nurse, and his mother is employed

- Returned to his mother: Q28:12-13
- God's revelation to Moses' mother: Q20:38-39, Q28:7-10
- Moses' preaching: Q7:103-129, Q10:84, Q20:24, Q20:42-51, Q23:45, Q26:10-22, Q28:3, Q43:46, Q44:18, Q51:38, Q73:15-17
- Moses met the Pharaoh: Q20:58-59, Q20:64-66, Q26:38-44
- The Pharaoh's magicians: Q7:111-116, Q10:79-80, Q20:60-64, Q26:37-44
- Moses vs. the magicians: Q7:115-122, Q10:80-81, Q20:61-70, Q26:43-48
- Dispute among the magicians: Q20:62, Q26:44-47
- Moses warned the magicians: Q10:81, Q20:61
- Moses and Harun were suspected to be magicians too: Q7:109, Q7:132, Q10:7-77, Q17:101, Q20:63, Q40:24, Q43:49
- Belief of the magicians: Q7:119-126, Q20:70-73, Q26:46
- The belief of Asiya: Q66:11
- Trial to Pharaoh's family: Q7:130-135
- Pharaoh's weakness: Q7:103-126, Q10:75, Q11:97-98, Q17:102, Q20:51-71, Q23:46-47, Q25:36, Q26:11, Q26:23-49, Q28:36-39, Q29:39, Q38:12, Q40:24-37, Q43:51-54, Q44:17-22, Q50:13, Q51:39, Q54:41-42, Q69:9, Q73:16, Q79:21-24
- Moses and his followers went away: Q20:77, Q26:52-63, Q44:23-24
- Moses and his followers were safe: Q2:50, Q7:138, Q10:90, Q17:103, Q20:78-80, Q26:65, Q37:115-116, Q44:30-31
- Pharaoh's belief was too late: Q10:90
- Pharaoh's and his army: Q2:50, Q3:11, Q7:136-137, Q8:52-54, Q10:88-92, Q17:103, Q20:78-79, Q23:48, Q25:36, Q26:64-66, Q28:40, Q29:40, Q40:45, Q43:55-56, Q44:24-29, Q51:40, Q54:42, Q69:10, Q73:16, Q79:25, Q85:17-18, Q89:13
- Believer among Pharaoh's family: Q40:28-45
- The Pharaoh punished the Israelites: Q2:49, Q7:124-141, Q10:83, Q14:6, Q20:71, Q26:22, Q26:49, Q28:4, Q40:25
- The Pharaohs and Haman were among the rejected: Q10:83, Q11:97, Q28:4-8, Q28:32, Q28:42, Q29:39, Q40:36, Q44:31

== See also ==
- Haman (Islam)#Qur'anic Narrative
- Al-Walid ibn Mus'ab, a character identified with the Pharaoh of Moses by Arab historians
- Verse of the Mustad'afin
