= Muqattaʿat =

Combinations of Arabic letters at the beginning of some surahs of the Quran

The mysterious letters (muqaṭṭaʿāt, Arabic: حُرُوف مُقَطَّعَات ḥurūf muqaṭṭaʿāt, "disjoined letters" or "disconnected letters") are combinations of between one and five Arabic letters that appear at the beginning of 29 out of the 114 chapters (surahs) of the Quran just after the Bismillāh Islamic phrase. The letters are also known as fawātiḥ (فَوَاتِح) or "openers" as they form the opening verse of their respective surahs.

Four (or five) chapters are named for their muqaṭṭaʿāt: Ṭā-Hā, Yā-Sīn, Ṣād, Qāf, and sometimes Nūn.

== Interpretations ==
=== Enigmatic / obscurative ===
Ahsan ur Rehman (2013) claims that there are phonological, syntactic and semantic links between the prefixed letters and the text of the chapters. Abd Allah ibn Abbas and Abdullah ibn Masud, are said to have favored the view that these letters stand for words or phrases related to God and His Attributes. The original significance of the letters is unknown. Tafsir (exegesis) has interpreted them as abbreviations for either names or qualities of God or for the names or content of the respective surahs. The general belief of most Muslims is that their meaning is known only to God. The Arabic word for "Ghayb" is غَائِب (/ɣāʔib/), meaning "absent" or "missing". In the context of Al-Ghayb (الغيب), it refers to the unseen, hidden, or concealed. It can also be used to describe something that is lost or vanished, divine, which is known as "Gayb".

=== Illustrative ===
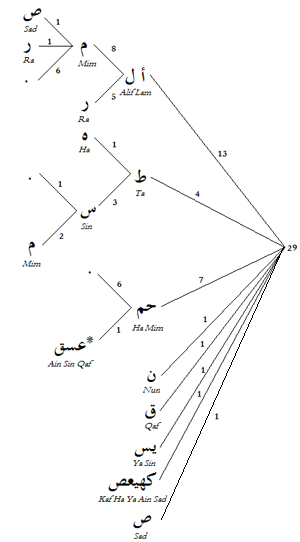
A tree diagram of the Qur'anic initial letters, The Quran code argues that these letters are repeated in multiples of 19 in the relevant surahs and that this is beyond human ability (miracle).

There have been attempts to give numerological interpretations. Loth (1888) suggested a connection to Gematria. Rashad Khalifa (1974) claimed to have discovered a mathematical code in the Qur'an based on these initials and the number 19, namely the Quran code or known as Code 19. According to his claims, these initials occur throughout their respective chapters in multiples of nineteen. The number 19 is directly mentioned in the 30th verse of Surah Al-Muddaththir to refer to the 19 keeper angels of Hell.

=== Explanatory ===
==== Acrophony / abbreviations ====
Devin J. Stewart argues the letters are integral to the text and establish a rhyme and a rhythm, similarly to rhyming chants such as, intended to introduce spells, charms or something connected to the supernatural. Christoph Luxenberg in the book The Syro-Aramaic Reading of the Koran (2000) proposed that substantial portions of the text of the Qur'an were directly taken from Syriac liturgy. His explanation of the disjoined letters in an article "Syriac Liturgy and the “Mysterious Letters” in the Qur’ān" (2008) is that they are remnants of indications for the liturgical recitation for Syriac hymns that ended up being copied into the Arabic text. In a series of interviews with Sami Aldeeb, Luxenberg clarifies which sequence of letters are abbreviations of which phrase, among other things changing the commonly cited explanations of some verses. (see also:Location of early Islam / Revisionist school of Islamic studies) Ḥamiduddin Farahi similarly attaches symbolic meanings to the letters, e.g. Nun (ن) symbolizing "fish" identifying the sura that mentions Jonah, or Ṭa (ط) representing "serpent" introducing suras that mention the story of Prophet Moses and serpents. Tabari, citing Ibn Abbas, says that "Nun" is the whale upon which the Earth sits.

Fakhr al-Din al-Razi, a classical commentator of the Qur'an, has noted some twenty opinions regarding these letters and mentions multiple opinions that these letters present the names of the Surahs as appointed by God. In addition, he mentions that Arabs would name things after such letters (for example, 'eye' as 'ع', clouds as 'غ', and whale as 'ن'). Amin Aḥsan Iṣlaḥi supported al-Razi's opinion, arguing that since these letters are names for Surahs, they are proper nouns.

==== Other theories ====
Theodor Nöldeke (1860) advanced the theory that the letters were marks of possession, belonging to the owners of Qur'anic copies used in the first collection by Zayd ibn Thābit during the reign of the Caliph 'Uthmān. According to Nöldeke, the letters ultimately entered the final version of the Qur'an due to carelessness. Nöldeke later revised this theory, responding to Otto Loth's (1881) suggestion that the letters had a distinct connection with the mystic figures and symbols of the Jewish Kabbalah. Nöldeke in turn concluded that the letters were a mystical reference to the archetypal text in heaven that was the basis for the revelation of the Qur'an. However, persuaded by Nöldeke's original theory, Hartwig Hirschfeld (1902) offered a list of likely names corresponding to the letters. Keith Massey (1996), noting the apparent set ranking of the letters and mathematical improbability that they were either random or referred to words or phrases, argued for some form of the Nöldeke-Hirschfeld theory that the "Mystery Letters" were the initials or monograms of the scribes who originally transcribed the sūras. Though, Massey explains that "the letters, which appear alone (qaf, nun), may not have the same purpose as the collection themselves", he furthermore admits that the "Mystery Letters" in Surah 42 violate his proposed ranking-theory, thus offering 2 possible scenarios for his theory.

The Hebrew Theory assumes that the letters represent an import from Biblical Hebrew. Specifically, the combination Alif-Lam would correspond to Hebrew El "god". Abbreviations from Aramaic or Greek have also been suggested.

Bellamy (1973) proposed that the letters are the remnants of abbreviations for the Bismillah. Bellamy's suggestion was criticized as improbable by Alford T. Welch (1978). One Western mystical interpretation of the muqattaʿat is given by Rudolf von Sebottendorf in his work Die Praxis der alten türkischen Freimauerei; von Sebottendorf interprets them as mantra-like formulas (Formel) to be meditated upon (in association with certain gestures) during a set of elaborate meditation exercises. He claims that these exercises are the basis of Freemasonry and alchemy, and that they are practiced by a secret society of Sufis; Muhammad is said to have learned these exercises from a hermit named "Ben Khasi", taught them to the innermost circle of his successors, and incorporated them into the text of the Qur'an in order to preserve them unchanged in perpetuity.

=== Mystical inferences ===
Ṣufis across Islamic sects have a tradition of mystical interpretation of the Quran, in keeping with broader Baṭini (esoteric) study and practice. The mysterious letters are a point of much speculation among Sufi scholars, particularly among those sects called the Baṭiniyya. The details differ between schools of Sufism, but one interpretation regards the letters as an extension to the ninety-nine names of God, with some authors offering specific "hidden" meanings for the individual letters.

An Ismaili ghulat sect known as Ḥurufism, based on a kabbalistic system of letter-based and numerological mysticism, attributed especial importance to the mysterious letters. Although the Hurufis were widely regarded as a heretical ghulat sect, and had little direct influence on Islamic theology, their ideas did have a wider impact on aesthetics and literature, as seen in the works of poets like Nasimi, Fuzuli, and Shah Ismail I of Safavid Persia.

In 1857–58, Baháʼu'lláh, founder of the Baháʼí Faith, wrote his Commentary on the Isolated Letters (Tafsír-i-Hurúfát-i-Muqattaʻih, also known as Lawh-i-Áyiy-i-Núr, Tablet of the Light Verse). In it, he describes how God created the letters. A black teardrop fell down from the Primordial Pen on the "Perspicuous, Snow-white Tablet", by which the Point was created. The Point then turned into an Alif (vertical stroke), which was again transformed, after which the Muqatta'at appeared. These letters were then differentiated, separated and then again gathered and linked together, appearing as the "names and attributes" of creation. Baháʼu'lláh gives various interpretations of the letters "alif, lam, mim", mostly relating to Allah, trusteeship (wilayah) and the prophethood (nubuwwah) of Muhammad. He emphasizes the central role of the alif in all the worlds of God.

The Báb used the muqaṭṭaʿāt in his Qayyúmu'l-Asmáʼ. He writes in an early commentary and in his Dalá'il-i-Sab'ih (Seven Proofs) about a hadith from Muḥammad al-Baqir, the fifth Shiʻi Imam, where it is stated that the first seven surat's muqaṭṭaʿāt have a numerical value of 1267, from which the year 1844 (the year of the Báb's declaration) can be derived.

=== In other religions ===
One obscure tradition from medieval Judaism speaks to the origins of the mysterious letters. According to one text found in the Cairo Genizah collection, the mysterious letters were added on the influence of Jewish elders on Muhammad, where the letters represented their names and other messages they created.

== Inventory ==
Muqatta'at occur in Quranic chapters 2–3, 7, 10–15, 19–20, 26–32, 36, 38, 40–46, 50 and 68. Furthermore, the codex of Ubayy ibn Ka'b additionally had Surah 39 begin with Ḥā Mīm, in line with the pattern seen in the next seven surahs. Multiple letters are written together like a word, but each letter is pronounced separately. They are 78 in total, at the beginning of 29 surahs, occurring in 14 distinct combinations. Fourteen out of 28 (or 29, counting hamza) letters of the Arabic alphabet are represented.

Table Number	Surah	Surah Order	Muqaṭṭaʿāt	Complete Ayah
1	al-Baqarah	2	ʾAlif Lām Mīm الٓمٓ	Yes
2	Āl Imrān	3	ʾAlif Lām Mīm الٓمٓ	Yes
3	al-Aʿrāf	7	ʾAlif Lām Mīm Ṣād الٓمٓصٓ	Yes
4	Yūnus	10	ʾAlif Lām Rā الٓر	No
5	Hūd	11	ʾAlif Lām Rā الٓر	No
6	Yūsuf	12	ʾAlif Lām Rā الٓر	No
7	Ar-Raʿd	13	ʾAlif Lām Mīm Rā الٓمٓر	No
8	Ibrāhīm	14	ʾAlif Lām Rā الٓر	No
9	al-Ḥijr	15	ʾAlif Lām Rā الٓر	No
10	Maryam	19	Kāf Hā Yā ʿAin Ṣād كٓهيعٓصٓ	Yes
11	Ṭā Hā	20	Ṭā Hā طه	Yes
12	ash-Shuʿārāʾ	26	Ṭā Sīn Mīm طسٓمٓ	Yes
13	an-Naml	27	Ṭā Sīn طسٓ	No
14	al-Qaṣaṣ	28	Ṭā Sīn Mīm طسٓمٓ	Yes
15	al-ʿAnkabūt	29	ʾAlif Lām Mīm الٓمٓ	Yes
16	ar-Rūm	30	ʾAlif Lām Mīm الٓمٓ	Yes
17	Luqmān	31	ʾAlif Lām Mīm الٓمٓ	Yes
18	as-Sajdah	32	ʾAlif Lām Mīm الٓمٓ	Yes
19	Yā Sīn	36	Yā Sīn يسٓ	Yes
20	Ṣād	38	Ṣād صٓ	No
21	Ghāfir	40	Ḥā Mīm حمٓ	Yes
22	Fuṣṣilat	41	Ḥā Mīm حمٓ	Yes
23	ash-Shūrā	42	Ḥā Mīm; ʿAin Sīn Qāf حمٓ عٓسٓقٓ	Yes, 2
24	Az-Zukhruf	43	Ḥā Mīm حمٓ	Yes
25	Al Dukhān	44	Ḥā Mīm حمٓ	Yes
26	al-Jāthiya	45	Ḥā Mīm حمٓ	Yes
27	al-Aḥqāf	46	Ḥā Mīm حمٓ	Yes
28	Qāf	50	Qāf قٓ	No
29	Al-Qalam	68	Nūn نٓ	No

== Structural analysis ==
There are 14 distinct combinations; the most frequent are ʾAlif Lām Mīm and Ḥāʾ Mīm, occurring six times each. Of the 28 letters of the Arabic alphabet, exactly one half appear as muqatta'at, either singly or in combinations of two, three, four or five letters. The fourteen letters are: ʾalif أ, hā هـ, ḥā ح, ṭā ط, yā ي, kāf ك, lām ل, mīm م, nūn ن, sīn س, ʿain ع, ṣād ص, qāf ق, rā ر. The six final letters of the Abjadi order (thakhadh ḍaẓagh) are unused. The letters represented correspond to those letters written without Arabic diacritics plus yāʿ ي. It is possible that the restricted set of letters was supposed to invoke an archaic variant of the Arabic alphabet modeled on the Aramaic alphabet.

Certain co-occurrence restrictions are observable in these letters; for instance, ʾAlif is invariably followed by Lām. The substantial majority of the combinations begin either ʾAlif Lām or Ḥāʾ Mīm.

In all but 3 of the 29 cases, these letters are almost immediately followed by mention of the Qur'anic revelation itself (the exceptions are surat al-ʻAnkabūt, ar-Rūm and al-Qalam); and some argue that even these three cases should be included, since mention of the revelation is made later on in the surah. More specifically, one may note that in 8 cases the following verse begins "These are the signs...", and in another 5 it begins "The Revelation..."; another 3 begin "By the Qur'an...", and another 2 "By the Book..." Additionally, all but 3 of these suras are Meccan surat (the exceptions are surat al-Baqarah, Āl ʾImrān and ar-Raʻd.)

Lām and Mīm are conjoined and both are written with prolongation mark. One letter is written in two styles. Letter 20:01 is used only in the beginning and middle of a word and that in 19:01 is not used as such. Alif Lām Mīm (الم) is also the first verse of Surah Al-Baqara, Surah Al-Imran, Surah Al-Ankabut, Surah Ar-Rum, Surah Luqman, and Surah As-Sajda.

== See also ==
- Al-Fatiha (the first surah in the Quran)
- Al-Mu'awwidhatayn (the last two surahs in the Quran)
- Al-Musabbihat (surahs beginning with God's glorification)

== Sources ==
- Dayeh, Islam (2009). "Al-Hawamim: Intertextuality and Coherence in Meccan Suras". In Neuwirth, Angelika; Sinai, Nicolai; Marx, Michael (eds.). The Qurʾān in Context. Brill. pp. 461–498.
