= Q43 =

Q43 may refer to:

- Q43 (New York City bus)
- ARA Cándido de Lasala (Q-43), a landing ship of the Argentine Navy
- Az-Zukhruf, a surah of the Quran
