= Ash-Shu'ara =

26th chapter of the Qur'an

Surah 26 of the Quran
الشعراء Ash-Shuʻarāʼ The Poets
- Qira'ah; English text
- Classification: Meccan
- Position: Juzʼ 19
- Hizb no.: 37
- No. of verses: 227
- No. of Rukus: 11
- No. of words: 1463
- No. of letters: 5553

Ash-Shu‘ara’ (Arabic: الشعراء, ’ash-shu‘arā’; meaning: The Poets) is the 26th chapter (sūrah) of the Qurʾan with 227 verses (āyāt). Many of these verses are very short. The chapter is named from the word Ash-Shu'ara in ayat 224. It is also the longest Meccan surah according to the number of verses.

The chapter talks about various prophets and their tribes, and how the disbelievers were destroyed after threatening the prophets with death. It also talks about the mercy of God (Allah). This surah starts with the story of Moses, followed by that of Abraham and the previous prophets.

Regarding the timing and contextual background of the revelation (asbāb al-nuzūl), it is an earlier "Meccan surah", which means it is believed to have been revealed in Mecca. The topic and the style indicate, and the traditions affirm, that it was uncovered during the center Makkan period. As indicated by Ibn Abbas, Surah Ta-Ha was uncovered first, at that point Surah Al-Waqiah, and afterward Surah Ash-Shu'ara.

== Summary ==
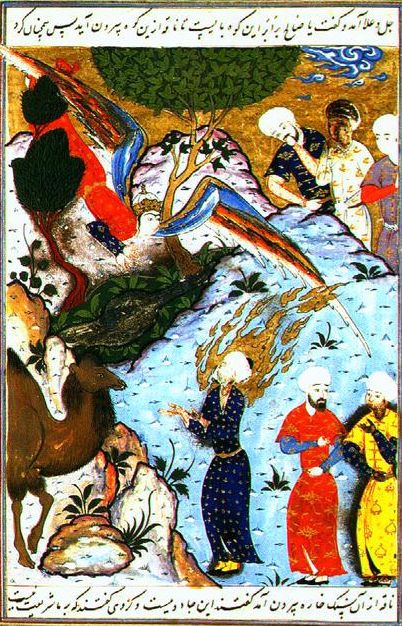
Salih inviting his people to see the She-Camel Illuminated collection of Stories of the Prophets

- 1-3 Muhammad is grieved at the unbelief of the Quraysh
- 4-5 God will grant them no miracle to save the Quran
- 6 The Quraish regard the Quran as a forgery
- 7-8 God will send a grim messenger whom they shall respect
- The story of Moses
  - 9-10 He is sent to Pharaoh and his people
  - 11-12 Fearing that he will be called an impostor, Moses asks that Aaron be sent with him
  - 13-16 Moses being assured that he will not be put to death for murder, is sent to demand release of the Israelites
  - 17-18 Pharaoh charges Moses with ingratitude
  - 19-21 Moses apologises to Pharaoh for killing the Egyptian
  - 22-27 Moses is charged with being a madman
  - 28 Pharaoh threatens Moses if he does not worship him
  - 29-32 Moses performs miracles before Pharaoh
  - 33-41 Egyptian magicians called to compete with Moses
  - 42-47 Moses outdoes the magicians, who are converted
  - 48-49 Pharaoh, enraged, threatens to crucify the magicians
  - 50-51 The magician converts put their trust in God
  - 52 Moses is commanded to lead the Israelites out of Egypt
  - 53-60 Pharaoh and his people pursue them
  - 61-65 The Red Sea is divided by Moses, and Israelites pass over
  - 66-68 The Egyptians are drowned, and become a warning to all unbelievers
- The story of Abraham
  - 69-82 He preaches against idolatry
  - 83-92 Abraham prays for himself and his father
  - 93-102 He warns his people of the vain repentance of idolaters in hell
  - 103, 104 Most of his people rejected him
- The story of Noah
  - 105 His people accused him of imposture
  - 106-110 Noah exhorts them to have faith in God
  - 111-115 Unbelievers tell Noah to reject his poor followers
  - 116 When he refuses, they threaten him with violence
  - 117-119 Noah takes refuge in God, and is saved in the ark
  - 120-122 The unbelievers are drowned
- The History of Hūd
  - 123 They charge God's messengers with imposture
  - 124-135 Hūd claims the prophetic office, and preaches to the Ádites
  - 136-139 They reject Hud's warnings and charge him with imposture
  - 139-140 The unbelieving Ádites are destroyed
- The story of the Thamúdites
  - 141 They charge the prophets with imposture
  - 142-152 Sálih, declaring himself a prophet, preaches to them
  - 153 The Thamúdites reject Sálih and call him a madman
  - 154-156 They demand a sign, and a she-camel is given for a sign
  - 157-159 They slay the she-camel, and are destroyed for infidelity
- The story of Lot
  - 160 The people of Sodom accuse their prophets with imposture
  - 161-166 Lot proclaims himself a prophet, and preaches to them
  - 167 The people of Sodom threaten him with violence
  - 168-171 God saves Lot from Sodom, but Lot's wife is destroyed
  - 172-174 The unbelievers are destroyed by a shower of stones
- The story of the Midianites
  - 175 They call God's messengers impostors
  - 176-184 Shuaib proclaims himself a prophet, and preaches to them
  - 185-187 They call him a madman and a liar, and challenge him to cause the heavens fall on them
  - 188-191 They are destroyed in their unbelief
- 192-195 The Quran is given to Muhammad, through Gabriel, in the Arabic language
- 196-197 The Quran is attested as God's Word by the former Scriptures
- 198-203 The hearts of the Quraish are hardened by the Quran
- 204 The Quraish scorn Muhammad's threats
- 205-207 God's mercy deepens the condemnation of impenitent infidels
- 208-209 God never destroys a people without first warning them
- 210-212 The Devil did not assist in revealing the Quran
- 213-214 Muhammad warned against idolatry, and admonished to preach Islam to his relatives
- 215-220 True believers are to be treated meekly, and unbelievers with forbearance
- 221-223 Devils descend on the hearts of unbelievers
- 224-227 Unbelieving poets are mad; believing poets commended
- 227 The unjust will speedily be punished

The significant issues, divine laws, and direction revealed in the surah can be listed as follows:-

1. God's address to Muhammad that he ought not fuss himself to death with distress for the individuals' disbelief.
2. Story of Moses, Pharaoh, and redemption of the offspring of Israel.
3. Story of Ibrahim and his contentions against idol worshippers.
4. The way that the idolaters and their false-deities will both be toppled into hellfire.
5. Accounts of Prophets Noah, Lot, Hud, Saleh, Shuaib and their people.
6. Qur'an is uncovered in the Arabic language
7. Satan plunge on those corrupt delinquents who tune in to gossip and are liars.

== Notable verses ==
=== 214 Warning Verse ===
And warn, O Muhammad, your closest kindred.

== Exegesis ==
The foundation of the chapter 26 is that the disbelievers of Makkah were in constant refusal to acknowledge the message of Islam given by Muhammad, stating that he did not provide evidence to support his claim to prophethood. They would mark him as a poet or a magician, mock his message and disparage his Mission. This situation was making incredible anguish and despondency for Muhammad.

The Chapter starts with uplifting statements to Muhammad, inferring,

For what reason do you fuss for their sake? If these individuals have not had believed in you, it is because they are stubborn, not the lack of signs for them. They will not yield to common sense they need to see a Sign which makes them bow their heads in inquietude. When this Sign appears at the appropriate time of time, they will themselves understand that what was being introduced to them was the Truth.

After this discourse, up to verse 191, very much the same topic has been introduced persistently, and it is stated:

The entire earth possesses large amounts of such Signs as can bring a truth-searcher to The Reality, yet the obstinate and misguided individuals have never accepted significantly in the wake of seeing the Signs, regardless of whether these were the Indications of the natural phenomena or the miracles of the Prophets. These pathetic individuals have determinedly clung to their wrong statements of faith till the Divine scourge really overwhelmed them."

== Hadith ==
- It is narrated on the authority of Aisha that when this verse (Q26.214) was revealed: " And warn thy nearest kindred," the Messenger of Allah (ﷺ) stood up on Safa and said: O Fatimah, daughter of Muhammad. O Safiyya bint Abd al-Muttalib, daughter of Abd al-Muttalib, O sons of 'Abd al-Muttalib. Ask what you wish from my property, but I cannot save you from Allah (if you disobey Him).
- Narrated Ibn Abbas: When the Verse:-- 'And warn your tribe of near kindred' (Q26.214). was revealed, the Prophet (ﷺ) started calling every tribe by its name, "O Bani Fihr!, O Banu Adi!, O people of Quraysh!"
- Narrated Ibn `Abbas: When the Verse:--'And warn your tribe of near-kindred (Q26.214), was revealed, the Prophet (ﷺ) ascended the Safa (mountain) and started calling, "O Bani Fihr!, O Banu Adi!, O sons of Abd Manaf ibn Qusai! " addressing various tribes of Quraysh till they were assembled. Those who could not come themselves, sent their messengers to see what was there. Abū Lahab and other people from Quraish came and the Prophet (ﷺ) then said, "Suppose I told you that there is an (enemy) cavalry in the valley intending to attack you, would you believe me?" They said, "Yes, for we have not found you telling anything other than the truth." He then said, "I am a warner to you in face of a terrific punishment." Abu Lahab said (to the Prophet) "May your hands perish all this day. Is it for this purpose you have gathered us?" Then it (surah Al-Masad) was revealed: "Perish the hands of Abu Lahab (one of the Prophet's uncles), and perish he! His wealth and his children will not profit him...." (Q111.1–5)
