= Ad-Dukhan =

44th chapter of the Qur'an

Surah 44 of the Quran
الدخان ad-Dukhān The Smoke
- Qira'ah; English text
- Classification: Meccan
- Position: Juzʼ 25
- No. of verses: 59
- No. of Rukus: 3
- No. of words: 346
- No. of letters: 1439

Ad-Dukhan (Arabic: الدخان, ad-dukhān; meaning: Smoke) is the 44th chapter (surah) of the Quran with 59 verses (ayat). The word dukhan, meaning 'smoke', is mentioned in verse 10.

حم ۝ The first verse is one of Quran's Muqatta'at, the letter combinations that appear in the beginning of some chapters.

Verse 37 mentions the people of Tubba, interpreters explain that this refers to the people of Sheba.

Regarding the timing and contextual background of the believed revelation (asbāb al-nuzūl), it is an earlier "Meccan surah", which means it is believed to have been revealed in Mecca, rather than later in Medina.

== Summary ==
- 1-6 The Quran sent down on the Blessed Night
- 7 God the only source of life
- 8-15 Unbelievers cautioned with the tormenting smoke
- 16-32 Pharaoh and his people destroyed for discarding Moses
- 33-37 The people of Makkah cautioned with the fate of the people of Tubba'
- 38-39 God did not create the universe in jest
- 40-42 The judgment-day a day when everyone reap what you sowed
- 43-50 Damnation of the wicked in hell
- 51-57 Rewards of the righteous in Paradise
- 58 The Quran revealed in Arabic as an admonition.

== Hadith ==
- Narrated Masruq ibn al-Ajda': One day I went to Ibn Masud who said, "When Quraish delayed in embracing Islam, the Prophet I invoked Allah to curse them, so they were afflicted with a (famine) year because of which many of them died and they ate the carcasses and Abu Sufyan came to the Prophet and said, 'O Muhammad! You came to order people to keep good relation with kith and kin and your nation is being destroyed, so invoke Allah I? So the Prophet I recited the Holy verses of Surah-Ad-Dukhan: 'Then watch you For the day that The sky will Bring forth a kind Of smoke Plainly visible.' (44.10) When the famine was taken off, the people renegade once again as nonbelievers. The statement of Allah (in Surah "Ad-Dukhan"-44) refers to that: 'On the day when We shall seize You with a mighty grasp.' (44.16) And that was what happened on the day of the battle of Badr." Asbath added on the authority of Mansur, "Allah's Apostle prayed for them and it rained heavily for seven days. So the people complained of the excessive rain. The Prophet said, 'O Allah! (Let it rain) around us and not on us.' So the clouds dispersed over his head and it rained over the surroundings."
- Narrated Masruq ibn al-Ajda': We came upon 'Abdullah bin Mas'ud and he said "O people! If somebody knows something, he can say it, but if he does not know it, he should say, "Allah knows better,' for it is a sign of having knowledge to say about something which one does not know, 'Allah knows better.' Allah said to His Prophet: 'Say (O Muhammad ! ) No wage do I ask of You for this (Quran) nor am I one of the pretenders (a person who pretends things which do not exist).' (38.86) Now I will tell you about Ad-Dukhan (the smoke), Allah's Apostle invited the Quraish to embrace Islam, but they delayed their response. So he said, "O Allah! Help me against them by sending on them seven years of famine similar to the seven years of famine of Joseph." So the famine year overtook them and everything was destroyed till they ate dead animals and skins. People started imagining to see smoke between them and the sky because of severe hunger. Allah said:'Then watch you for the Day that the sky will bring forth a kind of smoke plainly visible, covering the people. . . This is painful torment.' (44.10-11) (So they invoked Allah) "Our Lord! Remove the punishment from us really we are believers." How can there be an (effectual) reminder for them when an Apostle, explaining things clearly, has already come to them? Then they had turned away from him and said: 'One taught (by a human being), a madman?' 'We shall indeed remove punishment for a while, but truly, you will revert (to disbelief).' (44.12-15) Will the punishment be removed on the Day of Resurrection?" 'Abdullah added, "The punishment was removed from them for a while but they reverted to disbelief, so Allah destroyed them on the Day of Badr. Allah said:'The day We shall seize you with a mighty grasp. We will indeed (then) exact retribution." (44.16)
