= Al-Fajr (surah) =

89th chapter of the Qur'an

Surah 89 of the Quran
الفجر Al-Fajr The Dawn
- Qira'ah; English text
- Classification: Meccan
- Position: Juzʼ 30
- Hizb no.: 60
- No. of verses: 30
- No. of words: 139
- No. of letters: 584

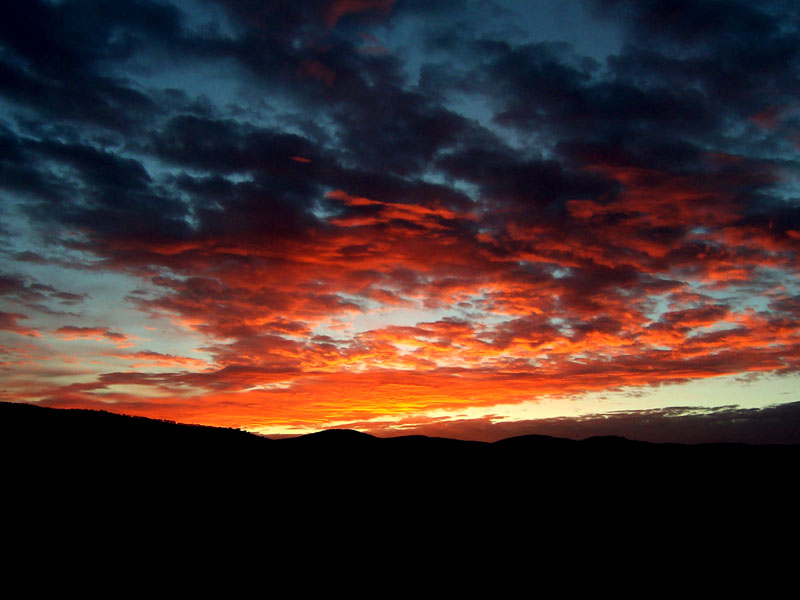
Daybreak

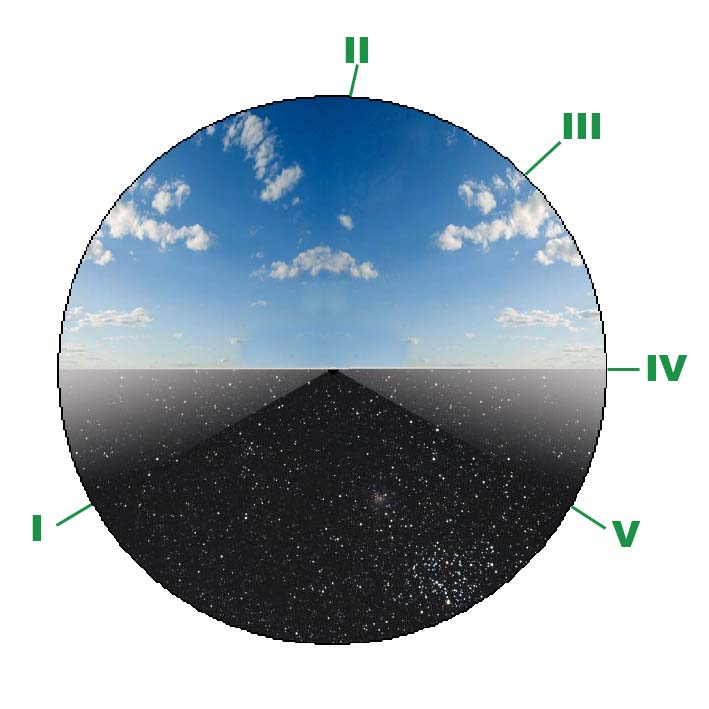
I. Fajr, II. Dhuhr, III. Asr, IV. Maghrib, V. Isha'a

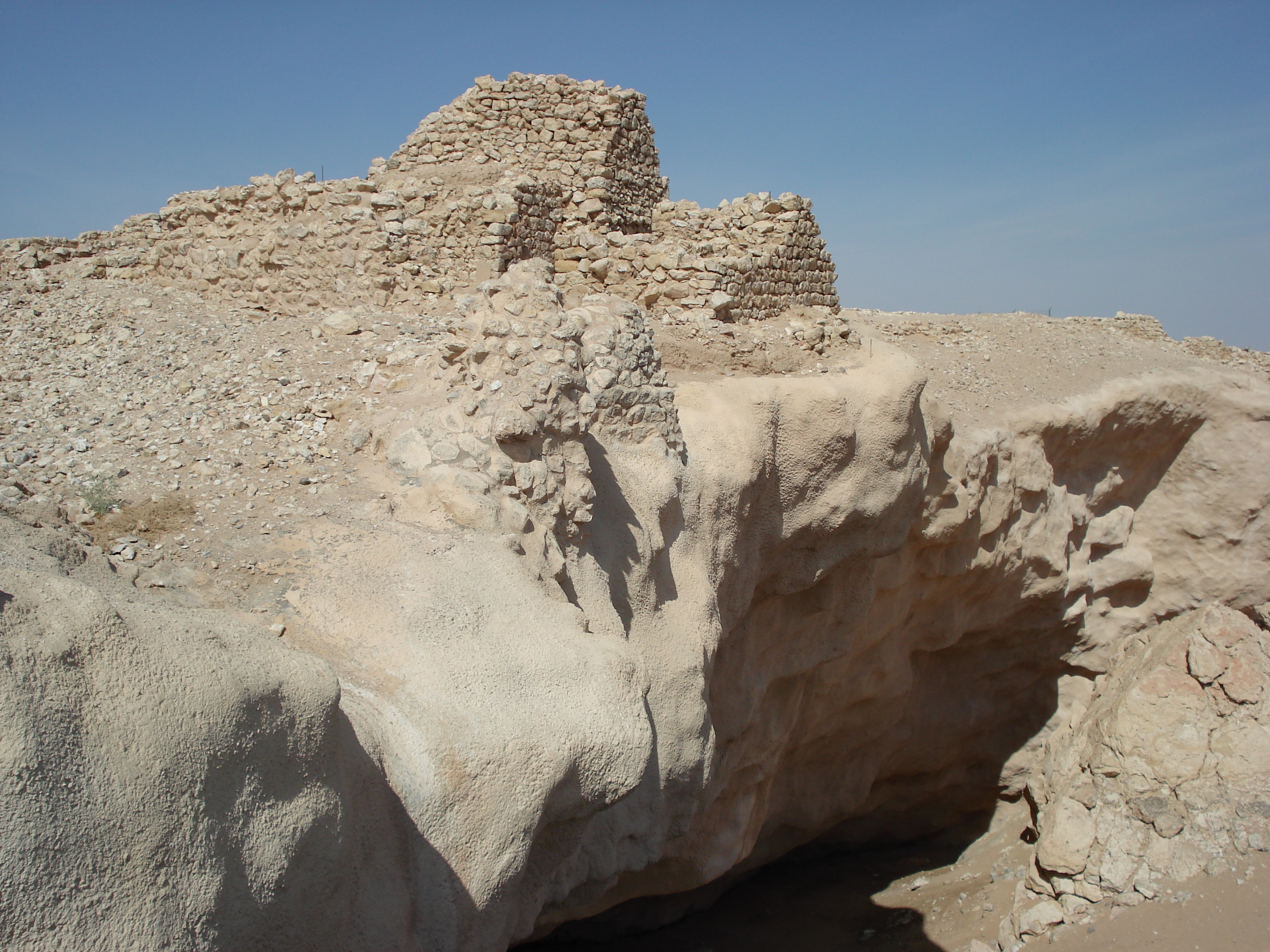
The ruins of the Ubarite oasis and its collapsed well-spring

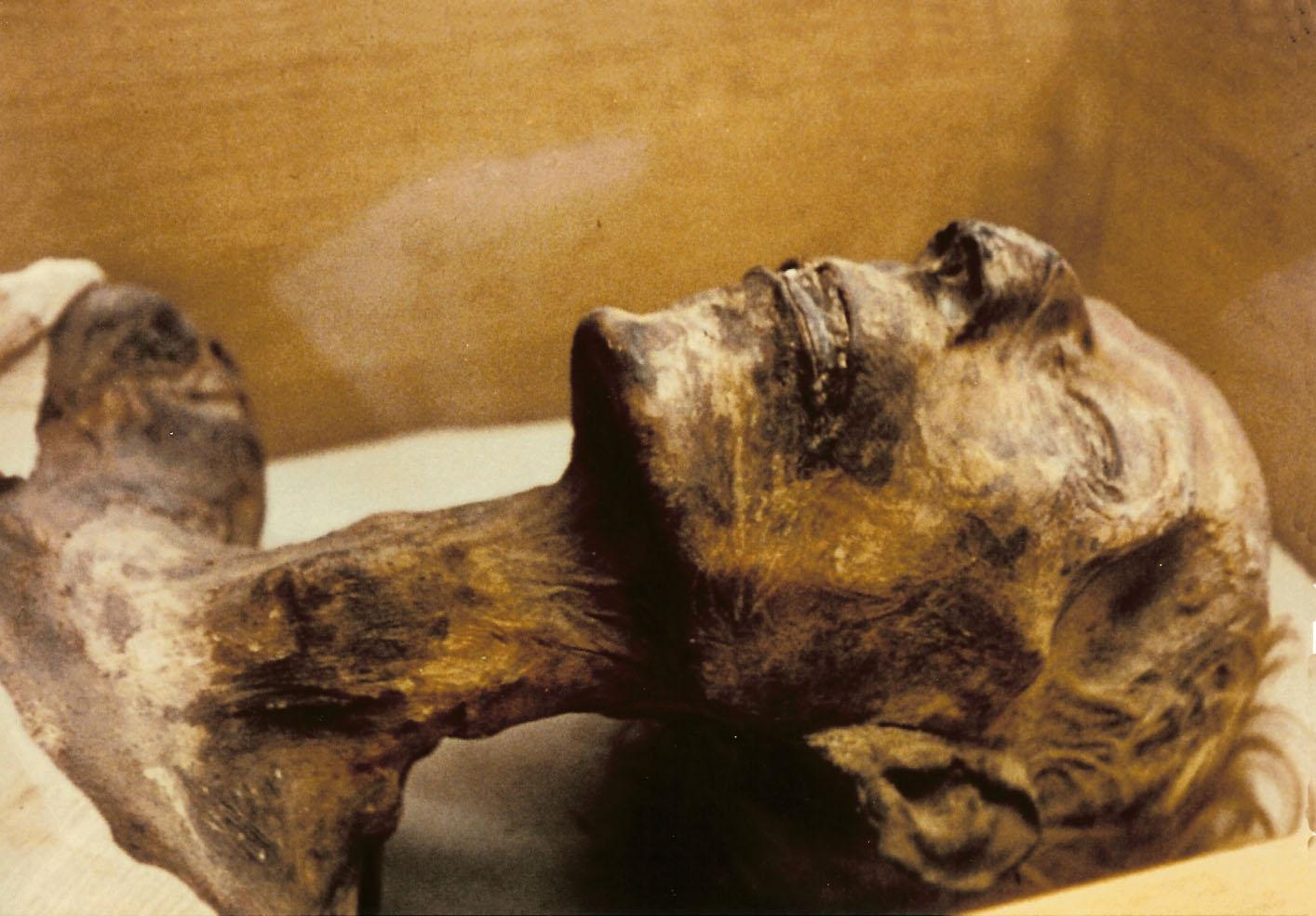
Mummy of Ramesses II

Al-Fajr (Arabic: الفجر, "The Dawn", "Daybreak") is the eighty-ninth chapter (sura) of the Quran, with 30 verses (ayat). The sura describes destruction of disbelieving peoples: the Ancient Egyptians, the people of Iram of the Pillars, and Mada'in Saleh. It condemns those who love wealth and look with disdain upon the poor and orphans. Righteous people are promised Paradise – the final verse says "And enter you My Paradise!". The Surah is so designated after the word wal-fajr with which it opens.

== Summary ==
- 1-4 Various oaths by natural objects
- 5-13 Unbelievers are warned by the fate of Ád, Thamúd, and Pharaoh
- 14-17 Man praises God in prosperity, but reproaches him in adversity
- 18-22 Oppression of the poor and the orphan denounced
- 23-26 The wicked will vainly regret their evil deeds on the Judgment Day
- 27-30 The believing soul invited to the joys of Paradise

== Period of revelation ==
Quran chapters are not arranged in the chronological order of believed revelation (wahy). Muhammad told his followers, the sahaba, the placement in Quranic order of every Wahy revealed along with the original text of Quran. Wm Theodore de Bary, an East Asian studies expert, describes that "The final process of collection and codification of the Quran text was guided by one overarching principle: God's words must not in any way be distorted or sullied by human intervention. For this reason, no serious attempt, apparently, was made to edit the numerous revelations, organize them into thematic units, or present them in chronological order....". Surat Al-Fajr is a Meccan sura and meccan suras are chronologically earlier suras that were revealed to Muhammad at Mecca before the hijrah to Medina in 622 CE. They are typically shorter, with relatively short ayat, and mostly come near the end of the Qur'an's 114 surahs. Most of the surahs containing muqatta'at are Meccan. Henceforth apart from traditions, this surah qualifies to be Meccan typically. According to Yusuf Ali, Al-Fajr may be placed in the dating period close to Surat Al-Lail and Ad-Dhuha.

=== Asbāb al-nuzūl ===
Asbāb al-nuzūl (occasions or circumstances of revelation) is a secondary genre of Qur'anic exegesis (tafsir) directed at establishing the context in which specific verses of the Qur'an were revealed. Though of some use in reconstructing the Qur'an's historicity, asbāb is by nature an exegetical rather than a historiographical genre, and as such usually associates the verses it explicates with general situations rather than specific events. According to of the mufassirūn this surah was revealed at Mecca, at a stage when opposition to Muhammad had grown to the stage of persecution of new Muslim converts.

According to an interpretation expounded on in the tafsīr (commentary) written by Sayyid Abul Ala Maududi (d. 1979) entitled Tafhim al-Qur'an,

"Its contents show that it was revealed at the stage when persecution of the new converts to Islam had begun in Makkah. On that very basis the people of Makkah have been warned of the evil end of the tribes of ʿĀd and Thamud and of Pharaoh." —Abul A'la Maududi

== Iram in the Quran ==
The Quran mentions Iram in connection with ‘imad (pillars): Quran 89:6-14

۝89:6 Did you not see how your Lord dealt with ʿĀd—
۝ 89:7 ˹the people˺ of Iram—with ˹their˺ great stature,
۝ 89:8 unmatched in any other land;
۝ 89:9 and Thamûd who carved ˹their homes into˺ the rocks in the ˹Stone˺ Valley;
۝ 89:10 and the Pharaoh of mighty structures?
۝ 89:11 They all transgressed throughout the land,
۝ 89:12 spreading much corruption there.
۝ 89:13 So your Lord unleashed on them a scourge of punishment.
۝ 89:14 ˹For˺ your Lord is truly vigilant.

There are several explanations for the reference to "Iram – who had lofty pillars". Some see this as a geographic location, either a city or an area, others as the name of a tribe. Those identifying it as a city have made various suggestions as to where or what city it was, ranging from Alexandria or Damascus to a city which actually moved or a city called Ubar. As an area, it has been identified with the biblical region known as Aram. It has also been identified as a tribe, possibly the tribe of ʿĀd, with the pillars referring to tent pillars. The Nabataeans were one of the many nomadic Bedouin tribes who roamed the Arabian Desert and took their herds to where they could find grassland and water. They became familiar with their area as the seasons passed, and they struggled to survive during bad years when seasonal rainfall decreased. Although the Nabataeans were initially embedded in the Aramean culture, theories that they have Aramean roots are rejected by modern scholars. Instead, archaeological, religious and linguistic evidence confirms that they are a North Arabian tribe.

"The identification of Wadi Rum with Iram and the tribe of ʿĀd, mentioned in the Quran, has been proposed by scholars who have translated Thamudic and Nabataean inscriptions referring to both the place Iram and the tribes of ʿĀd and Thamud by name."

The mystic ad-Dabbagh has suggested that these verses refer to ʿĀd's tents with pillars, both of which are gold-plated. He claims that coins made of this gold remain buried and that Iram is the name of a tribe of ʿĀd and not a location.

Iram became widely known to Western literature with the translation of the story "The City of Many-Columned Iram and Abdullah Son of Abi Kilabah" in The Book of One Thousand and One Nights.

== Theme of the surah ==
There are almost seven divisions in the Qur'an according to Themes. The last of these seven sections goes from surah Al-Mulk [surah number 67] to surah Al-Nas [surah number 114]. This final part [last seventh of the Quran] focuses on sources of reflection, people, final scenes they will face on Judgment Day and hellfire and paradise in general and admonition to the Quraysh about their fate in the present and the hereafter if they deny Muhammad, specifically. This surah Al-Fajr forms a pair with the next one Al-Balad. The central theme of both the surahs is to reprimand the leaders of the Quraysh for the rebellious attitude and arrogant behavior they have adopted with regard to Allah and their fellow human beings after being bestowed with favors and riches.
