= Al-Isra' =

17th chapter of the Qur'an

Surah 17 of the Quran
الإسراء Al-Isra The Night Journey
- Qira'ah; English text
- Classification: Meccan
- Time of revelation: 7th Century
- Position: Juzʼ 15
- Hizb no.: 29 to 30
- No. of verses: 111
- No. of Rukus: 12
- No. of Sajdahs: 1 (verse 109)
- No. of words: 1558
- No. of letters: 6643

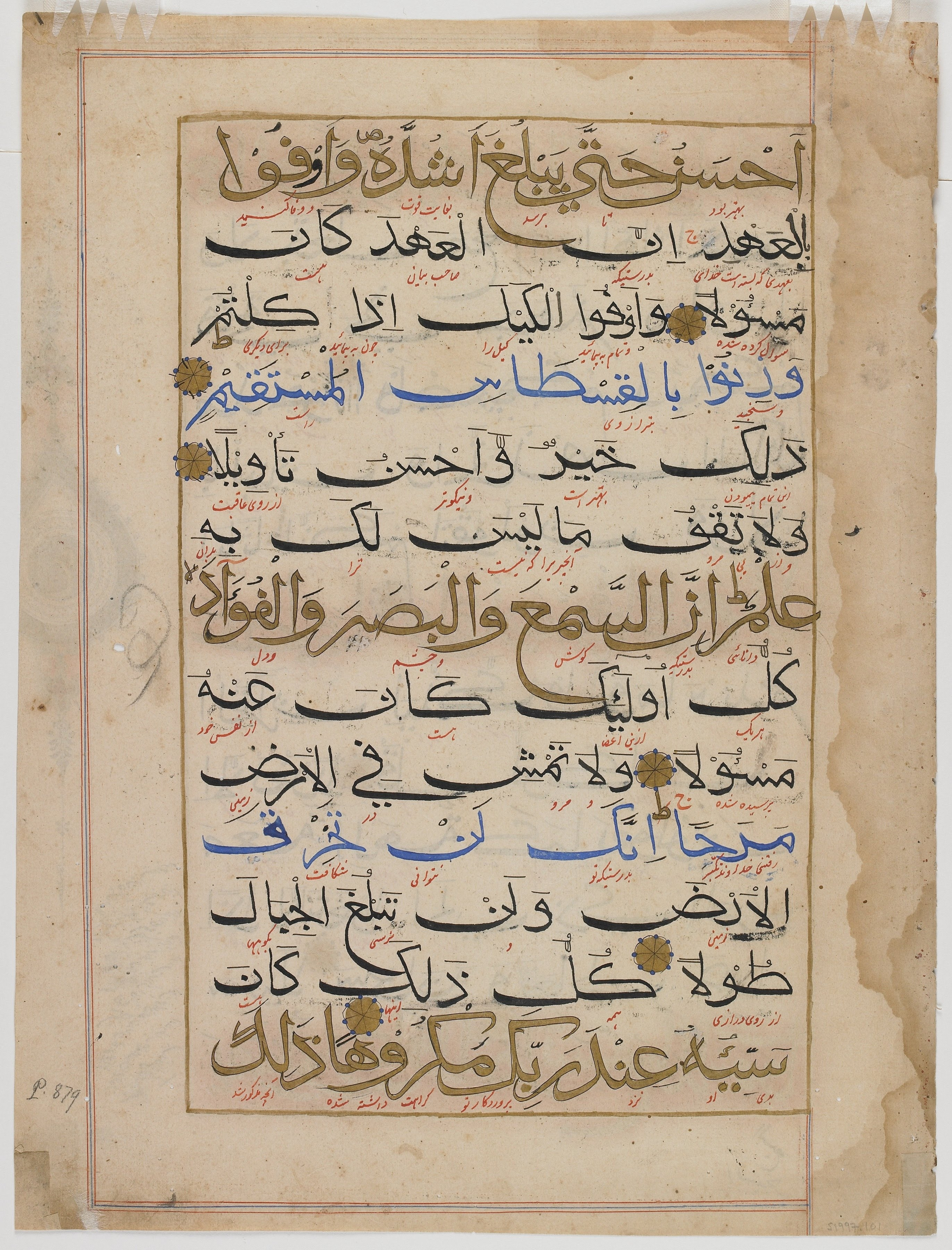
Quran page with Al-Isra verses 34-44; a later interlinear Persian translation is in red. Delhi Sultanate, India late 14th-15th century.

Al-Isra' (Arabic: الإسراء, lit. 'The Night Journey'), also known as Banī Isrāʾīl (Arabic: بني إسرائيل, lit. 'The Children of Israel'), is the 17th chapter (sūrah) of the Quran, with 111 verses (āyāt). The word Isra' refers to the Night Journey of the Islamic prophet Muhammad and about the Children of Israel. This surāh is part of a series of al-Musabbihat surahs because it begins with the glorification of God.

Regarding the timing and contextual background of the revelation (asbāb al-nuzūl), it is traditionally believed to be a Meccan surah, from the second Meccan period (615-619).

== Summary ==
- 1 God praised for the night journey
- 2 The law of Moses a direction to the Israelites
- 3 Noah’s gratitude commended to his posterity
- 4-8 The double sin of Israel and its punishment
- 9-10 The Quran a direction to both the faithful and the unbelievers
- 11 Men inconsiderate in their prayers
- 12 The night and day are signs to men
- 13 Every man’s fate bound about his neck
- 14-15 God will give every man the record of his life at the judgment day
- 16 No nation left without an apostle
- 17-18 The cities destroyed which rejected their apostles
- 19-21 Rewards and punishments of the faithful and unbelieving
- 22 Degrees of honour belong to the life to come
- 23-24 Men should worship only one God
- 24-26 Kindness to be shown to parents, the poor, and the stranger
- 27 Extravagance forbidden
- 28 Those unable to contribute for the support of the poor may help them by speaking kindly to them
- 32 Stinginess and foolish extravagance forbidden
- 33-35 Infanticide, fornication, and murder forbidden
- 35 The murdered man to be avenged
- 36 The substance of the orphan to be sacredly preserved
- 37 Men should lead lives of honesty and humility
- 41 God not to be dishonoured by idol-worship
- 42 Angels not daughters of God
- 43 Various warnings for the Quraish
- 44-45 A plurality of gods would lead to rebellion in heaven
- 46 All things praise God
- 47-49 The Quraish are judicially blinded to the Quran
- 50 Muhammad called a madman
- 51-53 The Quraish reject the doctrine of the resurrection
- 54 The dead when raised will fancy they have been dead but a little while
- 55-56 Idolaters and unbelievers to be mildly treated
- 57 Some prophets peculiarly favoured
- 58-59 The false gods need divine protection
- 60 Every city to be destroyed before the judgment-day
- 61 Muhammad not allowed to work miracles because of the unbelief of former tribes
- 62 The night-journey and the Zakkum tree causes of contention
- 63-64 Iblis disobeys God, and is cursed in consequence
- 65-66 He receives permission to delude humans and share with them their money and offspring
- 67 He shall have no power over God’s servants
- 68 God protects the merchant while on the sea
- 69 Idolaters forget their idols in times of danger 69 ۞ 71 They are ungrateful
- 72 The special privileges of mankind
- 73-74 In the judgment all shall be fairly judged
- 75-77 Muhammad almost seduced from Islam
- 78-79 The unbelievers almost persuade Muhammad to leave them
- 80-82 Exhortation to prayer
- 83-84 The truth of the Quran to be proclaimed
- 85 Man’s perversity seen both in prosperity and adversity
- 86 The spirit created of God
- 87-89 Revelation (inspiration) a peculiar favour from God to Muhammad
- 90 Men and genii could not produce a book like the Quran
- 91-95 Muhammad excuses his inability to work miracles
- 96-98 Men appointed messengers for men and angels for angels
- 99-100 The dreadful fate of the idolaters at the resurrection
- 101 God is able to raise the dead
- 102 Man covetous even in respect to God’s mercy
- 103-104 The nine signs of Moses fail to convince Pharaoh
- 105 Pharaoh destroyed
- 106 The children of Israel succeed Pharaoh in his possession of the land of Egypt
- 107 Why the Quran was revealed in stages
- 108 ۩ 109 Some Jews and Christians believe in the Quran
- 110 God and the Merciful the same
- 111 God hath neither son nor partner

== Exegesis ==
=== 1 The transportation of Muhammad to "the farthest Mosque". ===
Al-Isra, Ayahs of 78 and 79 on top of Nimavard madrasa's entrance tilling, Isfahan, Iran.

This surah takes its name from the first verse which, in Islamic tradition, tells the event of the Isra, the transportation of Muhammad during the night from the Great Mosque of Mecca to what is referred to as "the farthest Mosque"." The exact location is specified in the Quran in Arabic words أَسۡرَىٰ بِعَبۡدِهِۦ لَيۡلٗا مِّنَ ٱلۡمَسۡجِدِ ٱلۡحَرَامِ إِلَى ٱلۡمَسۡجِدِ ٱلۡأَقۡصَا but this is commonly taken to Noble Sanctuary (Temple Mount) in Jerusalem. Some scholars disagree about this (see Isra and Mi'raj) lively . While the city of Jerusalem (or al Quds) is not mentioned by name anywhere in the Quran, the first verse refers to Mohammed being taken from the 'Masjid ul-harram' to the 'Masjid al-Aqsa':

Glory to (Allah) Who did take His servant for a Journey by night from the Sacred Mosque to the farthest Mosque, whose precincts We (God) did bless,- so that We might show him some of Our Signs: for He is the One Who heareth and seeth (all things).

Within Islam, it is generally agreed upon that the 'Farthest Mosque' refers to Masjid al-Aqsa (i.e. the Temple Mount) in Jerusalem and the 'Sacred Mosque' refers to Masjid al-Haram. The surah also refers to the other prophets, for example, Musa (Moses).

This Meccan surah was revealed in the last year before the Hijra. Like all the Meccan surah, it stresses the oneness of Allah, the authority of the prophets. However, the primary theme of the surah is salah (daily prayers), whose number is said to have been fixed at five during the Miraj which it alludes to. In addition, the surah forbids adultery, calls for respect for father and mother, and calls for patience and control in the face of the persecutions the Muslim community was facing at the time.

=== 8 Hell ===
Verse 17:8 refers to hell and states that those who reject the faith will be punished:

It may be that your Lord may (yet) show Mercy unto you; but if ye revert (to your sins), We shall revert (to Our punishments): And we have made Hell a prison for those who reject (all Faith).

However, it also states that Allah is merciful and could forgive.

It also refers to the hereafter and states that there is a punishment for not believing in it (Verse 7:10):

And to those who believe not in the Hereafter, (it announceth) that We have prepared for them a Penalty Grievous (indeed).

=== 13-15 Day of Judgement ===
Verses 17:13 to 17:15 tells that fate is in people's hands and tells that what they do will be rewarded or punished for on the Day of Judgement.

Every man's fate We have fastened on his own neck: On the Day of Judgment We shall bring out for him a scroll, which he will see spread open. (It will be said to him:) "Read thine (own) record: Sufficient is thy soul this day to make out an account against thee." Who receiveth guidance, receiveth it for his own benefit: who goeth astray doth so to his own loss: No bearer of burdens can bear the burden of another: nor would We visit with Our Wrath until We had sent a Messenger (to give warning).

=== 26 Verse of Dhul Qurba ===
17:26 And give to the kinsman his due, and to the Miskin (poor), and to the wayfarer. But spend not wastefully (your wealth) in the manner of a spendthrift.

The verse relates to the controversies of the land of Fadak in modern-day Saudi Arabia.

=== 64 Satan’s influence on humankind ===
and incite whoever you can of them with your voice, mobilize against them all your cavalry and infantry, share with them their wealth and children, and make them promises.” But Satan promises them nothing but delusion.

This verse explains different methods Satan uses to corrupt souls—while making it clear that his power is only over those who choose to follow him. Satan influences humankind in how they earn and spend money, and in how they even conceive—their children. Some scholars also suggest it may imply that Satan has a share in corrupting human offspring, spiritually or morally. Thus, “participation” means spiritual or moral corruption. This can occur when children are fed with wealth earned through haram (unlawful) means—such as stolen goods or resources unjustly taken from others, including exploited people or nations.

=== 70 Angels & jinn - the other two main creations beside Humans (one with freewill and the former without) ===
۞ Verse 17:70 tells that mankind has been given a position "above many of those whom we created" angels and jinns.

=== 71 Day of Judgement ===
Verse 17:71 contains a reference to Yawm al-Qiyamah, the Day of Judgement:

One day We shall call together all human beings with their (respective) Imams: those who are given their record in their right hand will read it (with pleasure), and they will not be dealt with unjustly in the least.

In Kitab al-Kafi, Imam Ja'far al-Sadiq was questioned on the interpretation of 17:71 ("On that day, We will call forth every people with their Imam...") to which he responded it is the Imam that is with them and he is the Mahdi, al-Qa'im of the people of that time.

=== 81: Muhammad destroys the Arabian idols ===
In the day of conquesting Makkah, Muhammad made his way towards the Kaaba which is seen as a symbol of the Oneness of Allah. It was filled with idols, numbering 360. He proceeded to knock them down using his bow while reciting the verse from the Quran:

"And say: 'The truth has come, and falsehood has vanished away; surely falsehood is ever certain to vanish." (Qur'an 17:81)

This act was significant as it symbolized the removal of polytheistic practices and the reclaiming of the Kaaba for the worship of Allah alone, in line with the teachings of Islam. This event is considered a major milestone in the establishment of the Islamic faith and the spread of monotheism.

Muhammad began the usual circumambulation on his ride, and after completing the circumambulation, he called for 'Uthman ibn Talha, the key holder of the Kaaba, and took the key from him. He entered the Kaaba and observed images of the prophets Abraham and Ishmael, throwing divination arrows. He strongly denounced these practices of the Quraysh and ordered that all idols, images and effigies be destroyed.

=== 104 Children of Israel ===
Verse 17:104 'And We said thereafter unto the Children of Israel, “Dwell in the land. And when the promise of the Hereafter comes to pass, We shall bring you as a mixed assembly.”'

al-Tabari, in Tafsir al-Tabari (883 CE), wrote that this referred to the Israelites' settlement in the land of al-Sham (Greater Syria region). al-Zamakhshari wrote in al-Kashshaf (12th century) that it referred to Egypt, devoid of Pharaoh. al-Baghawi in Tafsir al-Baghawi (12th c.) and al-Qurtubi in Tafsir al-Qurtubi (13th century) each write that it referred to both al-Sham and Egypt. ibn Kathir, in Tafsir Ibn Kathir (14th century), writes that "Allah caused those from the Children of Israel, who had been oppressed from east and west, to inherit the land, and to inherit the land of Fir`awn's (pharaoh's) people, with its farmland, crops and treasures."
