= Adh-Dhariyat =

51st chapter of the Qur'an

Surah 51 of the Quran
الذاريات Adh-Dhāriyāt The Winnowing Winds
- Qira'ah; English text
- Classification: Meccan
- Position: Juzʼ 26 to 27
- No. of verses: 60
- No. of Rukus: 3
- No. of words: 360
- No. of letters: 1546

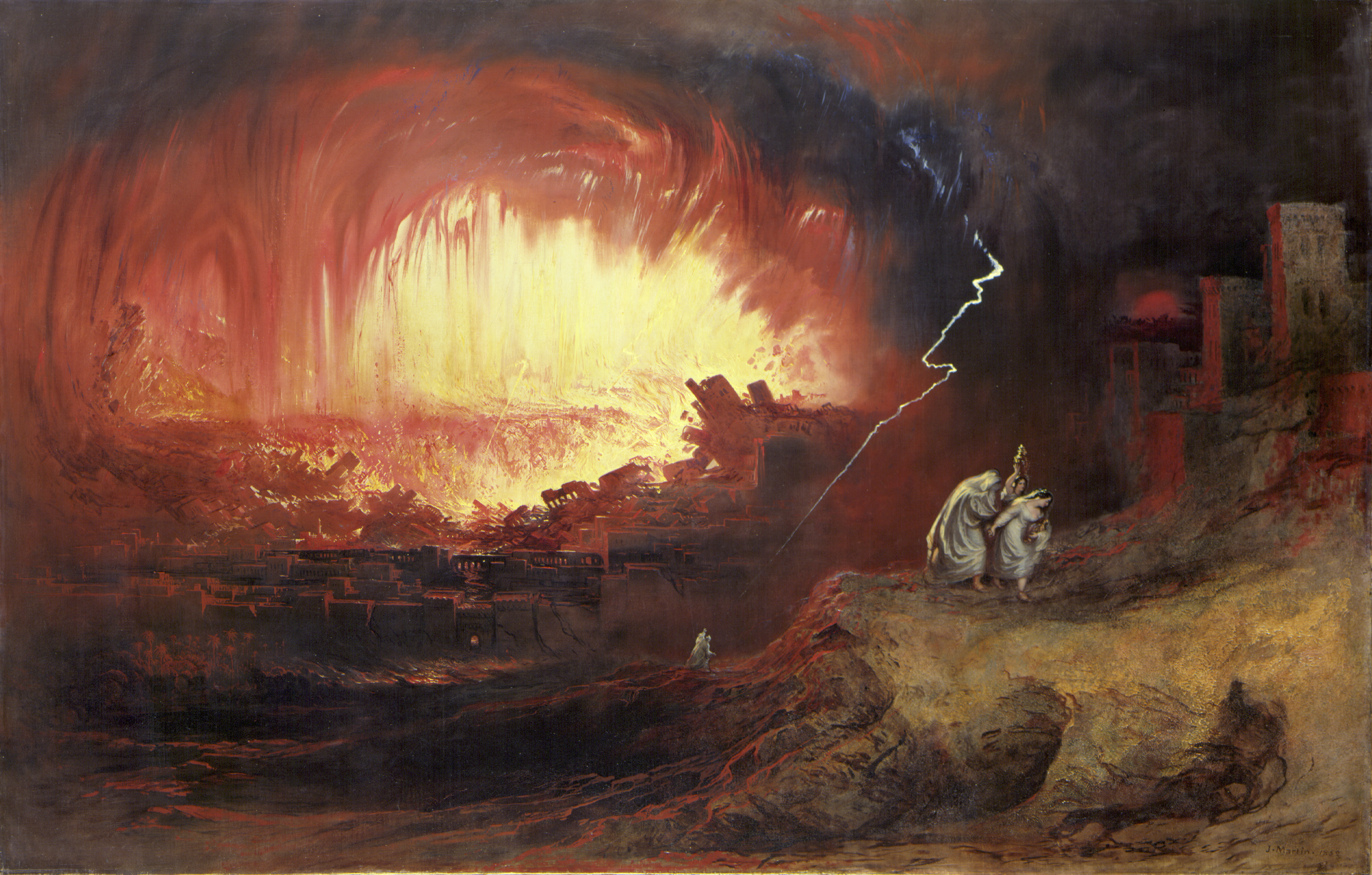
The Destruction of Sodom and Gomorrah, John Martin

Adh-Dhariyat (Arabic: الذاريات, adh-dhāriyāt; meaning: The Winnowing Winds) is the 51st chapter (surah) of the Qur'an with 60 verses (ayat). It mentions Abraham, Noah, and the day of judgment, and reiterates the essential Quranic message.

Regarding the timing and contextual background of the believed revelation (asbāb al-nuzūl), it is a "Meccan surah", which means it is believed to have been revealed in Mecca, rather than later in Medina.

== Structure ==
According to Angelika Neuwirth's literary analysis, as related through Carl Ernst, sura 51, like many early Meccan suras, consists of a tripartite structure: I, 1– 23; II, 24– 46; III, 47– 60. These three sections can be seen in a 2016 translation, The Clear Quran, which breaks the entire Quran into smaller thematic sections. The sura can be further broken down as follows:

- Rider oaths (9 verses) and end-times with double portraits (14 verses), including four thematic sections in the Clear Quran entitled, "Judgement is inevitable", "Warning to the Deniers", "Good News for the Devout", and "God's Signs in creation".
- The discourse of guests of Abraham (14 verses) and four other prophets (9 verses), including six thematic sections in the Clear Quran titled according to the prophet mentioned in the corresponding verses.
- God's creation (7 verses) and a warning (7 verses), including five thematic sections in the Clear Quran such as "God's Power of Creation" and "Warning to the Deniers".

== Summary ==
- 1-6 Numerous oaths that the judgment will come
- 7-11 Oaths and curses relating to unbelievers
- 12-16 Doom of infidels and reward of true believers
- 17-19 The piety and charity of Muslims
- 20-22 God reveals himself in his work of providence
- 23 God swears by himself that the Qurán is true
- 24-30 The story of Abraham's entertaining angels
- 31-37 Story of the destruction of Sodom
- 38-46 Pharaoh, Ád, Thamúd, and the people of Noah destroyed for rejecting their prophets as impostors
- 47-49 God reveals himself to men in his works of creation
- 50-51 Makkans warned to leave their idols and to fly to God
- 52-53 Every apostle of God called a magician or madman
- 54-55 Muhammad to withdraw from idolaters and yet to admonish them for the sake of true believers
- 56-58 Men and genii created to serve God
- 59-60 Woe to unbelievers who injure the apostles of God
