= Al-Qasas =

28th chapter of the Qur'an

Surah 28 of the Quran
القصص Al-Qaṣaṣ The Story
- Qira'ah; English text
- Classification: Meccan
- Position: Juzʼ 20
- Hizb no.: 40
- No. of verses: 88
- No. of Rukus: 9
- No. of words: 1585
- No. of letters: 5847

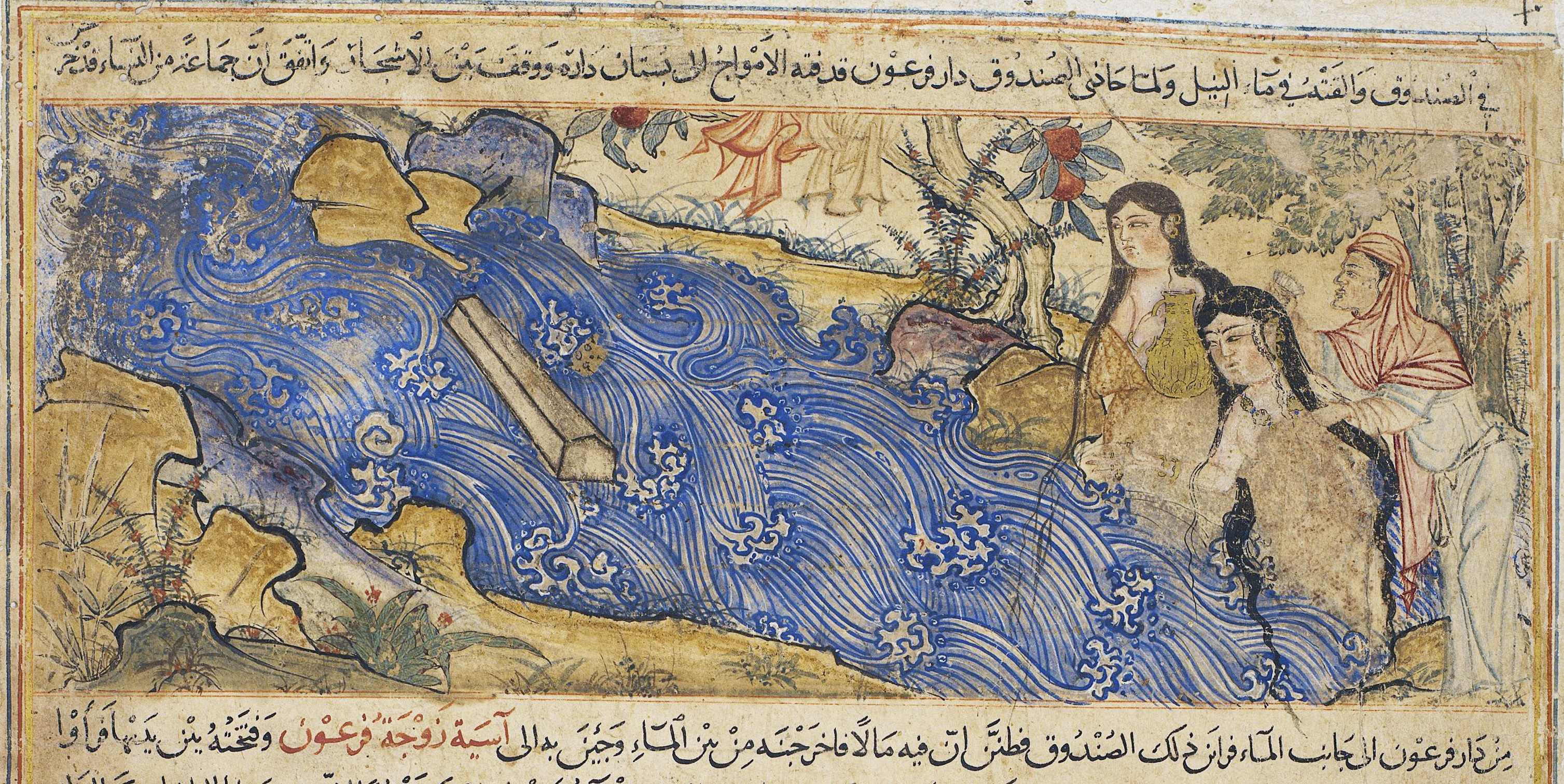
Pharaoh's wife and her servants find baby Moses in the Nile. Illustration from the Persian Jami' al-tawarikh

Al-Qasas (Arabic: القصص, al-qaṣaṣ; meaning: The Story) is the 28th chapter (sūrah) of the Qur'an with 88 verses (āyāt).

According to Ibn Kathir's commentary, the chapter takes its name from verse 25 in which the word Al-Qasas occurs. Lexically, qasas means to relate events in their proper sequence. Thus, from the viewpoint of the meaning too, this word can be a suitable title for this Surah, for the detailed story of the Prophet Moses has been related in it. It also includes the story of Qarun in verses 76 to 83, explaining how Qarun was proud of himself thinking that his huge wealth was earned by his own science, denying the grace of God on him, and being destroyed by God later with his wealth underground.

Regarding the timing and contextual background of the revelation (asbāb al-nuzūl), it is traditionally believed to be a Meccan surah, from the second Meccan period (615-619 CE).

== Summary ==
- 1-3 Muhammad receives the story of Moses for the benefit of believers
- 4 Pharaoh oppresses the Israelites
- 5 God determines to befriend the weak and to destroy oppressors
- 6 Moses's mother directed to commit her child to the river
- 7-8 Pharaoh's family take up the infant Moses
- 9-10 The anxiety of Moses's mother—his sister watches him
- 11-12 Moses refuses the Egyptian nurse, and his mother is employed
- 13 God bestows on him wisdom and strength
- 14-20 He slays an Egyptian and flees to Madian
- 21-22 By divine direction he reaches the wells of Madian
- 23-24 He waters the flocks of the daughters of Shuaib (Jethro)
- 25 Meeting Shuaib, he relates his history
- 26-28 Shuaib gives him one of his daughters in marriage
- 29 Fulfilling the marriage contract, Moses journeys towards Egypt
- 29-32 He sees the burning bush, and receives prophetic commission and power to perform miracles
- 33-35 Moses, fearing Pharaoh, asks the help of Aaron
- 36 Egyptians regard Moses and Aaron as sorcerers
- 37 Moses threatens them with God's judgment
- 38 Pharaoh, claiming to be a god, asks Hámán to build a tower up to heaven
- 38-39 Pharaoh and his princes blaspheme God
- 40 God drowns Pharaoh and his princes in the sea
- 41-42 They shall be rejected of God in the resurrection
- 43 Moses receives the Pentateuch for a direction to his people
- 44-46 Muhammad inspired to preach to the Arabs
- 47 His preaching renders unbelievers inexcusable
- 48 The Quraish reject both Pentateuch and Quran
- 49 They are challenged to produce a better book than these
- 50-53 The Makkans warned by the faith of certain Jews
- 54 Reward of converted Jews and Christians
- 55 Character of true converts to Islam
- 56 Allah guides whomever He wills
- 57 The Quraish fear to follow Muhammad lest they be expelled from Makkah
- 58-59 Cities destroyed for unbelief in, and persecution of, God's true prophets
- 60-61 Present prosperity no sign of God's favour
- 62-64 False gods will desert their votaries in judgment-day
- 65-69 The idolaters shall be speechless then, but penitents shall be saved
- 70-73 God, the only true God, produces the recurrence of day and night
- 74-75 God shall produce a witness against every nation at the judgment
- 76-82 The story of Korah
- 83-85 Pardon granted to the humble and obedient
- 86 Muhammad received the Quran unexpectedly
- 87-88 Muhammad exhorted to steadfastness in the faith of Islam

== See also ==
- Verse of the Mustad'afin
- Moses in Islam
- Pharaoh in Islam
