= Verse of the Mustad'afin =

Fifth verse of Surah al-Qasas

The beginning of Surah al-Qasas.

The Verse of the Mustad'afin (Persian: آیه مستضعفین, romanized: Āya-ye Mostaż'afīn) refers to the fifth verse of Surah al-Qasas. In Islamic exegesis, the verse is understood as a promise that God will bestow His favor upon those who have been oppressed, appoint them as leaders, and make them inheritors of the land.

== Verse text and translation ==
The verse reads:

﴾وَنُرِيدُ أَنْ نَمُنَّ عَلَى الَّذِينَ اسْتُضْعِفُوا فِي الْأَرْضِ وَنَجْعَلَهُمْ أَئِمَّةً وَنَجْعَلَهُمُ الْوَارِثِينَ﴿

In Tafhim al-Qur'an, Abul A'la Maududi translates the verse as:

"It is Our will to bestow Our favor upon those who were oppressed in the land, make them leaders, and make them inheritors of the earth."

== Occasion of revelation ==
According to some reports, Surah al-Qasas was revealed during the eleventh year after the beginning of Muhammad's prophethood. During this period, Muslims were facing the boycott and siege in Shi'b Abi Talib, while two of Muhammad's supporters, Abu Talib and Khadijah, had died, and Muhammad's preaching journey to Ta'if had ended unsuccessfully. As a result, a sense of weakness and insecurity had spread among the Muslims. In this context, the Qur'an recounts the story of Pharaoh and Moses to provide reassurance and restore hope among the believers.

Before the verse of the inheritance of the oppressed, Surah al-Qasas describes the oppression and tyranny of Pharaoh. The Qur'an states that Pharaoh "exalted himself in the land" and divided its people into groups, weakening a section of them by killing their sons and sparing their women. According to Ibn Kathir, the group that was oppressed by Pharaoh was the Children of Israel, whom he subjected to forced labor and hardship while humiliating them. The verse also describes Pharaoh as one of the corrupters. Al-Tabari explains that God's promise to grant favor to those who were oppressed refers to the Children of Israel, whom Pharaoh had weakened, and that they would become leaders and inherit the land after the destruction of Pharaoh and his people.

== Meaning of the Term “Mustad‘af” ==
The term mustad‘af (مستضعف) is derived from the Arabic root ḍ-ʿ-f (meaning “weakness”). However, because it appears in the istif‘āl form, it refers to someone who has been made weak or placed under pressure, rather than someone who is naturally weak or powerless. In this sense, a mustad‘af may have actual or potential abilities but is prevented from using them because of oppression by tyrants or powerful groups. Commentators have also classified mustad‘afīn into different categories, including intellectual, cultural, economic, moral, and political forms of weakness. Some exegetes argue that the Qur’an’s emphasis in these verses is mainly on those who are politically and morally oppressed.

=== Interpretation of the verses ===
According to Naser Makarem Shirazi, the opening verses of Surah al-Qasas describe a general divine principle that applies to all times and peoples. These verses state that God intends to favor the oppressed and make them leaders and inheritors of the earth. He considers this a promise of the victory of truth over falsehood and a message of hope for those seeking justice and the end of oppression. Makarem Shirazi gives the defeat of Pharaoh and the rise of the Israelites as an example of the fulfillment of this promise. He also considers the establishment of the Islamic state after the rise of Islam as another example, when early Muslims who had faced persecution and hardship gained power. According to him, the broader fulfillment of this promise is associated in Islamic traditions with the establishment of a global just rule by the Mahdi.

== In hadiths ==
In Nahj al-Balagha, in the section of short sayings (Hikma 209), Ali ibn Abi Talib is reported to have said that the world would turn toward them after a period of hardship and resistance, comparing it to a camel that refuses to give milk to its owner but keeps it for its young. He then recited the verse: “And We desired to bestow favor upon those who were oppressed in the land, and to make them leaders and make them inheritors” (Qur'an 28:5).

A narration attributed to Ali ibn Husayn (Zayn al-Abidin) states that, by the One who sent Muhammad as a bringer of good tidings and a warner with the truth, the righteous among the Ahl al-Bayt and their followers are comparable to Moses and his followers, while their enemies and their followers are comparable to Pharaoh and his followers.

A narration attributed to the Prophet Muhammad, transmitted through al-Mufaddal from Imam Ja'far al-Sadiq, states that the Prophet looked at Ali, Hasan, and Husayn and wept, saying: “You will be among the oppressed after me.” When al-Mufaddal asked Imam al-Sadiq about the meaning of this statement, he replied that it referred to them as the Imams after the Prophet. He then cited the verse, “We intend to bestow favor upon those who were oppressed in the land and make them leaders and make them the inheritors” (Qur'an 28:5), stating that this verse continues to apply to them until the Day of Resurrection.

== See also ==
- Al-Qasas
- Moses in Islam
- Pharaoh in Islam
- Ahl al-Bayt
- Nahj al-Balagha
- Tafsir
