= Qaf (surah) =

50th chapter of the Qur'an

Surah 50 of the Quran
ق Qāf Qaf
- Qira'ah; English text
- Classification: Meccan
- Position: Juzʼ 26
- No. of verses: 45
- No. of Rukus: 3
- No. of words: 373
- No. of letters: 1507

Qaf (Arabic: ق, the letter qāf), is the 50th chapter (sūrah) of the Qur'an with 45 verses (āyāt). The name is taken from the single discrete Quranic "mysterious letter" qāf that opens the chapter. It is the beginning of the Hizb al-Mufassal, the seventh and the last portion (manzil). Concepts which "Qaf" deals with the Resurrection and the Day of Judgement.

Regarding the timing and contextual background of the believed revelation (asbāb al-nuzūl), it is a "Meccan surah", which means it is believed to have been revealed in Mecca, rather than later in Medina.

== Summary ==
- 1 Q. The letter qāf, By the glorious Quran
- 2-3 The unbelievers wonder at the doctrine of the resurrection
- 4-5 Talks about the resurrection raising up to Allah and effect of disbelief in Truth
- 6-11 God’s works a proof of His power to raise the dead
- 12-14 The Quraish warned by the fate of other nations who rejected their prophets
- 15 God not so exhausted by the creation that He cannot raise the dead
- 16 God is nearer to man than his jugular vein
- 17-18 Angels record all human speech and actions
- 19-20 Death and judgment shall overtake all men
- 21-22 The testimony of the two angels shall condemn the unbelievers
- 24-26 God shall cast the wicked into hell
- 27-29 Satan shall disclaim the idolaters in hell and the hell shall be filled with the wicked
- 30 God asks Hellfire whether it has been filled.
- 31-35 Paradise shall come near the true believers
- 36-37 Former generations destroyed as a warning to the people of Makkah
- 38 The heavens and the earth created in six days
- 39-40 Muhammad exhorted to patience with unbelievers
- 41-44 Events at Day of Resurrection and proof of Allah's ability to create and cause anything (especially humans) to die
- 45 Muhammad not sent to compel men to believe, but only to warn them

== See also ==
- Esoteric interpretation of the Quran
