= Al-A'raf (surah) =

7th chapter of the Qur'an

Surah 7 of the Quran
ٱلْأَعْرَاف Al-ʾAʿraf The Elevation
- Qira'ah; English text
- Classification: Meccan
- Other names: The Battlements; The Purgatory
- Position: Juzʼ 8—9
- Hizb no.: 16—18
- No. of verses: 206
- No. of Rukus: 24
- No. of Sajdahs: 1 (verse 206)
- No. of words: 3341
- No. of letters: 14435

Al-Araf (Arabic: ٱلأعراف, al-ʾAʿrāf; meaning: The Heights) is the 7th chapter (sūrah) of the Quran, with 206 verses (āyāt). It takes its name from verses 46–47, in which the word A'raf appears. Al-A'raf also refers to a realm of the afterlife in Islam inhabited by those who are evenly balanced in their sins and virtues and so neither in heaven or hell.

Regarding the timing and contextual background of the revelation (Asbāb al-nuzūl), it is a "Meccan surah", which means it was revealed before the Hijra. According to the scholar Abul A'la Maududi, the surah were revealed about the same time as that of the surah Al-An'am, i.e., the last year of the Islamic prophet Muhammad's residence at Makkah: the manner of its admonition clearly indicates that it belongs to the same period and both have the same historical background; however, it cannot be declared with assurance which of these two was uncovered before the other. The audience should keep in mind the introduction to Al-An'am.

== Summary ==
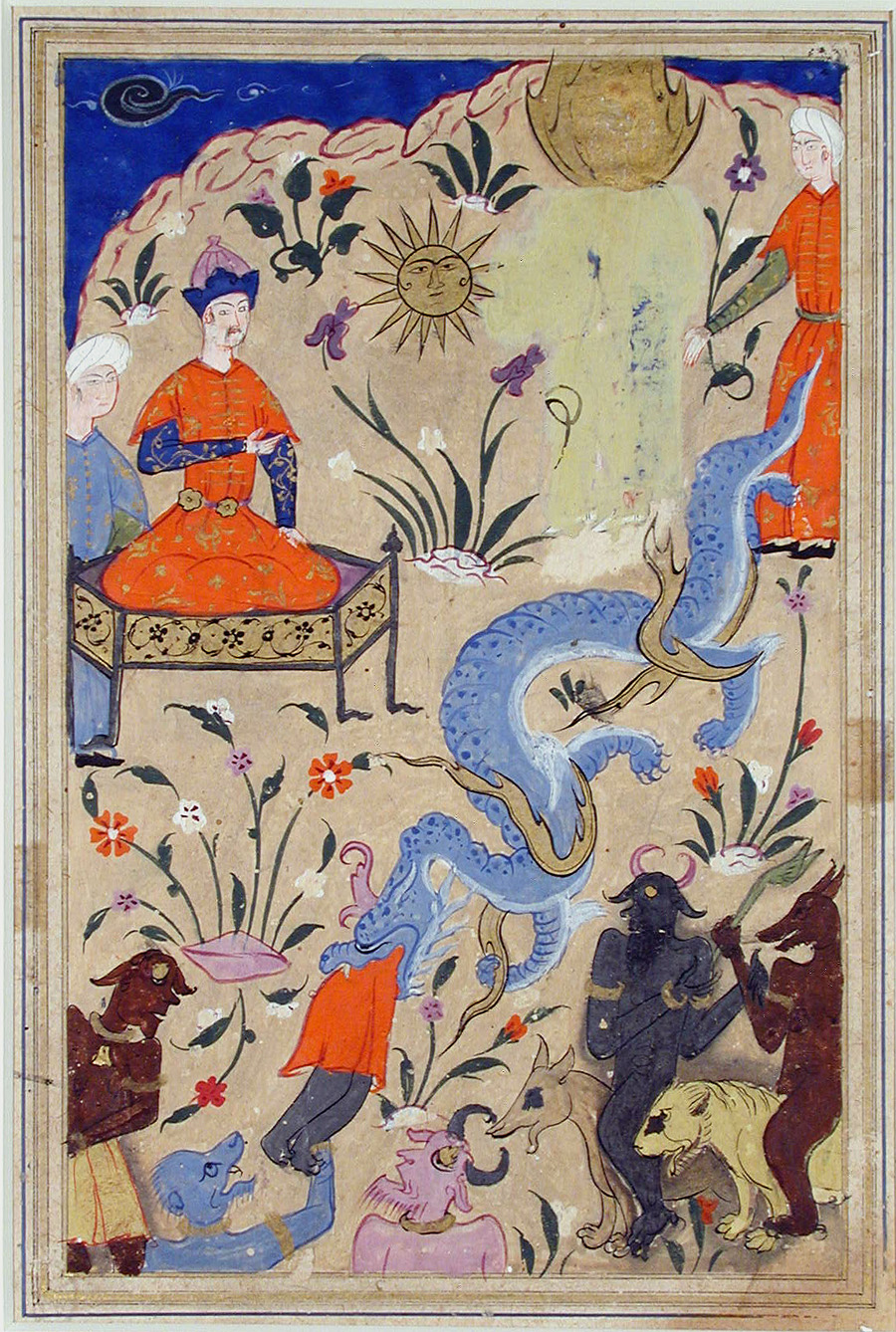
Pharaoh watches a serpent devour a demon in the presence of Musa; from a manuscript of Qisas al-Anbiya, c. 1540.

- 1-2 Allah tells Muhammad not to doubt the Quran
- 3 The people exhorted to believe in it
- 4-5 Many cities destroyed for their unbelief
- 6-9 Prophets and their hearers on the judgment-day
- 10 The ingratitude of infidels
- 11 The creation of Adam
- 11-12 Satan refuses to obey Allah by bowing to Adam
- 13 He is driven from Paradise
- 14-15 He is respited until the resurrection
- 16-17 He avows his purpose to beguile man
- 18 God threatens Satan and his victims
- 19-24 The fall of Adam and Eve
- 25-26 They are expelled from Paradise
- 27-29 Indecent customs condemned
- 30-31 God to be sought in prayer
- 32-34 True worshippers to be decently clad
- 35 Every nation has a fixed term of life
- 36-42 The doom of those who reject the apostles of God
- 43-45 The blessed reward of true believers
- 45-46 God's curse on the infidels
- 47-50 The veil of A'raf and its inhabitants
- 51-52 The rejecters of God's apostles to be forgotten
- 53-54 A warning against rejecting Muhammad
- 55-59 The Creator and Lord of the worlds to be served
- The History of Noah
- 60-65 Noah rejected by his people—their fate
- The History of Hūd
- 66-73 Húd rejected by the Ádites—their fate
- The History of Sálih
- 74-80 Sálih rejected by the Thamúdites—their destruction
- The Story of Lot
- 81-85 Lot rejected and the Sodomites destroyed
- The History of Shuaib
- 86-94 Shuaib rejected by the Madianites, and their doom
- God speaks about other nations in the past
- 95-96 Unbelievers at Makkah unaffected either by adversity or prosperity
- 97-101 The dreadful fate of those cities who rejected the apostles of God and charged them with imposture
- 102-103 They are reprobated
- The story of Moses
- 104-105 Moses is sent to Pharaoh and his princes
- 106-108 The miracles of the serpent and leprous hand
- 109-115 The magicians of Egypt called
- 116-120 Contest by miracles between Moses and the magicians
- 121-123 Several magicians converted to Moses
- 124-127 Pharaoh's anger kindled against them
- 128 Pharaoh and his princes persecute Moses and his people
- 129-130 Moses exhorts his people to patient trust in God
- 131-132 Adversity and prosperity alike unavailing to bring Pharaoh to repentance
- 133-134 The Egyptian unbelievers plagued
- 135 The hypocrisy of the Egyptians
- 136 They are destroyed in the Red Sea
- 137 The people of Moses triumph, and possess the eastern and western land
- 138-141 The children of Israel become idolatrous
- 142 Moses makes Aaron his deputy, and fasts forty days
- 143 He desires to see the glory of God, but repents his rashness
- 144-145 God gives Moses the law on two tables
- 146-147 Infidels threatened for calling their prophets impostors
- 148 The people of Moses worship the golden calf
- 149 They repent their sin
- 150 Moses in indignation assaults Aaron
- 151 He prays for forgiveness for himself and Aaron
- 152 He calls for vengeance on the idolaters
- 153 God merciful to believers
- 154 Moses's anger is appeased
- 155 He chooses seventy elders
- 155-156 Moses prays for deliverance from destruction by lightning
- 156-159 The Illiterate Prophet foretold by Moses
- 160 Some Jews rightly directed
- 161 The Israelites divided into twelve tribes
- 161 The rock smitten, and manna and quails given
- 162-163 The command to enter the city saying Hittatun, and the fate of the disobedient
- 164-167 The Sabbath-breakers changed into apes
- 168-169 Dispersion of the Jews among the nations
- 170-171 Some of their successors faithful to the law of Moses
- 172 God shakes Mount Sinai over the Israelites
- God mentioned other topics
- 173-175 God's covenant with the children of Adam
- 176-179 The curse of Balaam a warning to infidels
- 180 Many genii and men created for hell
- 181-182 The names of God not to be travestied
- 183-184 God's method of leading infidels to destruction
- 185 Muhammad not possessed of a devil
- 186 No hope for the reprobate
- 187 The coming of the “last hour” sudden
- 188 Muhammad no seer, only a preacher
- 189-190 guilty of idolatry
- 191-198 The folly of idolatry
- 199 Muhammad commanded to use moderation
- 200-201 He is to repel Satan by using the name of God
- 202 The people of Makkah incorrigible
- 203 They charge Muhammad with imposture
- 204 ۩ 206 The Quran to be listened to in silence and holy meditation

== Subject matter ==
Although heading of the subject matter of this surah can be summarized as "Invitation to the Divine Message", some further elaboration is required to comprehend the underlying themes and their interconnection.

Ayaat	Subject
1-10	People have been welcome to follow the Message sent down to them through Muhammad and cautioned of the outcomes of its dismissal.
11-25	The account of Adam has been connected with the end goal of caution his relatives against the detestable devices of Satan who is ever prepared to delude them as he did on account of Adam and Eve.
26-53	These ayaat contains some Divine guidelines, and distinguish these from Satan's directions, and portrays a realistic image of the outcomes and the results of the two.
54-58	As the Message has been sent from Allah (Who is the Creator of the sky and the earth and everything in them), it ought to be followed, for it resembles the downpour He sends down to give life to the dead earth.
59-171	Occasions from the lives of some notable prophets - Noah, Hud, Salih, Lot, Shu'aib, Moses (Allah's tranquility arrive all) - have been identified with show the outcomes of the dismissal of the Message, and the addressees of Muhammad have been reprimanded to acknowledge and follow the Message so as to get away from condemnation.
172-174	As the Covenant with the Israelites was referenced toward the finish of the previous section, the entire humankind has been reminded suitably to remember the Covenant that was made at the hour of the appointment of Adam as the Vicegerent of Allah so the entirety of his offspring ought to recollect it and acknowledge and follow the message that was conveyed by Muhammad.
175-179	The case of the person who had the information on the Message yet disposed of it, has been referred to as a notice to the individuals who were regarding the Message as bogus; they have been urged to utilize their faculties to perceive the Message; in any case Hell would be there residence.
180-198	Deviations of the individuals who don't utilize their resources appropriately to comprehend the Message have been managed and they have been reprimanded, impugned and cautioned of the genuine outcomes of their opposing disposition towards the message of Muhammad.
199-206	Taking everything into account, guidelines have been given to Muhammad, and through him to his followers, about the attitude they should opt towards the individuals who dismiss the Message and go astray from it.

== Contents ==
The chapter refers to Adam and Eve, Noah, Lot, Hud, Saleh, Shuaib, Moses and Aaron. The significant issues, Divine laws and points of guidance in this surah are as follows

1. A greeting is given to the People of the Book (Jews and Christians) to become Muslims.
2. An admonition is given to the unbelievers about the results of their disavowal through referring to the case of punishments which were caused upon previous nations for their off-base mentality towards their Rasools.
3. The Jews are cautioned about the results of their deceptive lead towards the prophets.
4. Precept to proliferate the message of Islam with astuteness.
5. The fact that the Rasools just as the individuals to whom they are sent will be addressed on the Day of Judgment.
6. Precept to the Believers that they should wear respectable and appropriate dress and eat pure and good food.
7. Conversation between the inhabitants of Paradise, the prisoners of hell and the individuals of A'raf (a spot between the Paradise and hellfire).
8. Luxuriousness and difficulty are the reminders from Allah.
9. Muhammad is the Rasool for the entirety of humankind.
10. The fact that the coming of Muhammad was depicted in Torah and the Gospel (Bible).
11. Jews have created fabricated a wrong belief about Allah's creation.
12. Humankind's declaration about Allah at the hour of Adam's creation.
13. Allah made all of humankind from a single soul.
14. Allah's command to show forgiveness, speak for justice and stay away from the ignorant.
15. Allah's order about tuning in to the recitation of The Quran with complete quietness.

== Theme ==
The chief subject of this Surah is an invitation to the Divine Message sent down to Muhammad. The Messenger had been admonishing the individuals of Makkah for 13 years. Yet there was no substantial impact on them, since they had deliberately ignored his message. And had become so adversarial that Allah was going to order Muhammad to disregard them and go to others. That is the reason they are being reproved to acknowledge the message and an admonition is given about the results of their off-base demeanor. Since Muhammad was going to get Allah's edict to relocate from Makkah, the finishing up part of this Surah addresses the People of the Book with whom he was going to come into contact at Al-Madinah. In the ayaat directed to the Jews, the outcomes of their deceptive mentality towards the prophets are likewise brought up clearly. As they proclaimed to put belief in Musa (Moses) yet their practices were against his lessons. They were defying him as well as were in certainty worshipping falsehood.

Towards the ending of the Surah, guidelines are given to Muhammad and his adherents to show tolerance and exercise patience in answer to the incitements of their rivals. Since the devotees were feeling the squeeze and stress, are encouraged to be cautious and not make any stride that may hurt their cause.

== Exegesis ==
=== 80-84 Lot in Islam ===
Verses 7:80–84 deal with the story Lot who was sent to a city, that, according to the quranic narrative, was of the transgressors. Angels descend to protect Lot and his daughters, and the city is destroyed by a stone rain. Lot's wife perishes as well. Lot was sent to a group of people who had committed unprecedented levels of immorality. The men amongst them approached other men with desire instead of women; and thus they were transgressing the bounds of God. Upon hearing the accusation that Prophet Lot had leveled on them, his people gave no answer but this: they said, "Drive them out of your city: these are indeed men who want to be clean and pure!" (the second part of the statement was probably a form of sarcasm). In the end, Allah saved Prophet Lot and his family except his wife who was amongst the evildoers and Allah punished the people by sending a rain of stones down on them.

=== 103-156 Moses ===
The narrative focuses on the history of Moses.

=== 142 Golden Calf ===
The incident of the Golden Calf as narrated in Q7:142 paints a positive light on Aaron. The Quran says that Aaron was entrusted the leadership of Israel while Moses was up on Mount Sinai (Arabic: طُـور سِـيـنـاء, tur sina’) for a period of forty days . Q19:50 adds that Aaron tried his best to stop the worship of the Golden Calf. Further parts of the story are to be found in Quran 7:150. The story ends in an earlier chapter, Quran 5:25.

=== 157: the coming of Muhammad ===
Verse 7:157 reveals that prophecies about the coming of Muhammad were present in the Jewish law and Gospel.

=== 160: the twelve tribes of Israel ===
Verse 160 refers to the twelve tribes of Israel:

"We split them up into twelve tribal communities, and We revealed to Moses, when his people asked him for water, [saying], 'Strike the rock with your cane,' whereat twelve fountains gushed forth from it. Every tribe came to know its drinking-place. And We shaded them with clouds, and We sent down to them manna and quails: 'Eat of the good things We have provided you.' And they did not wrong Us, but they used to wrong [only] themselves."

=== 163-166 Disobedience of the People of the Sabbath ===
Tabataba'i says in his commentary on Al-Mizan, regarding verses 163–166 of Surah Al-A'raf: "The people of the Sabbath were a group of Israelites who lived in the port of Eilat on the coast of the Red Sea." To test them, God prohibited fishing on the Saturdays; but they disobeyed this command. The city's inhabitants were divided into three groups: the sinners who disobeyed God's command, the group who remained silent in the face of this disobedience, and the group who prevented them from doing so. Despite their advice having no effect, forbidders continued to do so in order to fulfill their duty before God and perhaps the sinners would stop disobeying. According to Tabataba’i, only the group that forbade the wrongdoing were saved from punishment, while the sinners were transformed into monkeys. He also cites a narration from Imam al-Baqir, according to which, after the group of forbidders left the city, they encountered the inhabitants the next morning who had turned into monkeys.

=== ۩ 206 Prostration ===
This final verse, verse 206, a sajdah, or prostration, is preferred.

۝ Moreover the angels who are with my LORD do not proudly disdain his service, but they celebrate his praise and worship him.

== Gallery ==
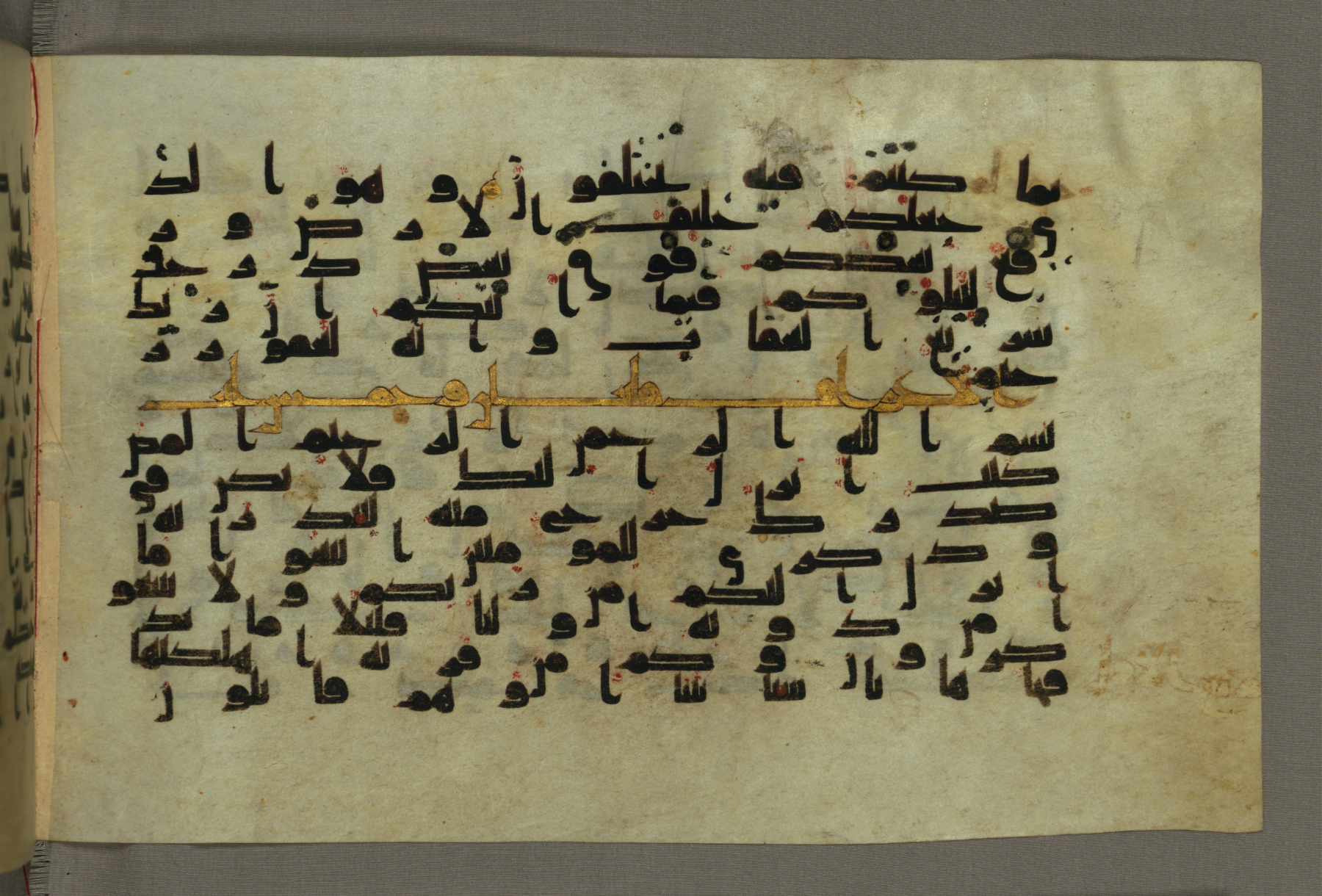
Folio from Walters manuscript W.552 with a text page containing an illuminated heading in gold ink for chapter 7

== Second meaning of word ==
Al-A'raf also refers to is a separator realm or borderland between Jannah (Paradise) and Jahannam (Hell), inhabited by those whose good deeds keep them from the Fire (hell) and whose evil deeds keep them from the Garden (paradise). After everyone else has been let into the Garden, and if the mercy of their Lord permits it, they will be allowed in.

== See also ==
- Al Aaraaf — a poem based on it by Edgar Allan Poe
- Limbo
- Purgatory
