= Ta-Ha =

20th chapter of the Qur'an

Surah 20 of the Quran
طه Ṭā Hā see: mysterious letters
- Qira'ah; English text
- Classification: Meccan
- Position: Juzʼ 16
- Hizb no.: 32
- No. of verses: 135
- No. of Rukus: 8
- No. of words: 1534
- No. of letters: 5399

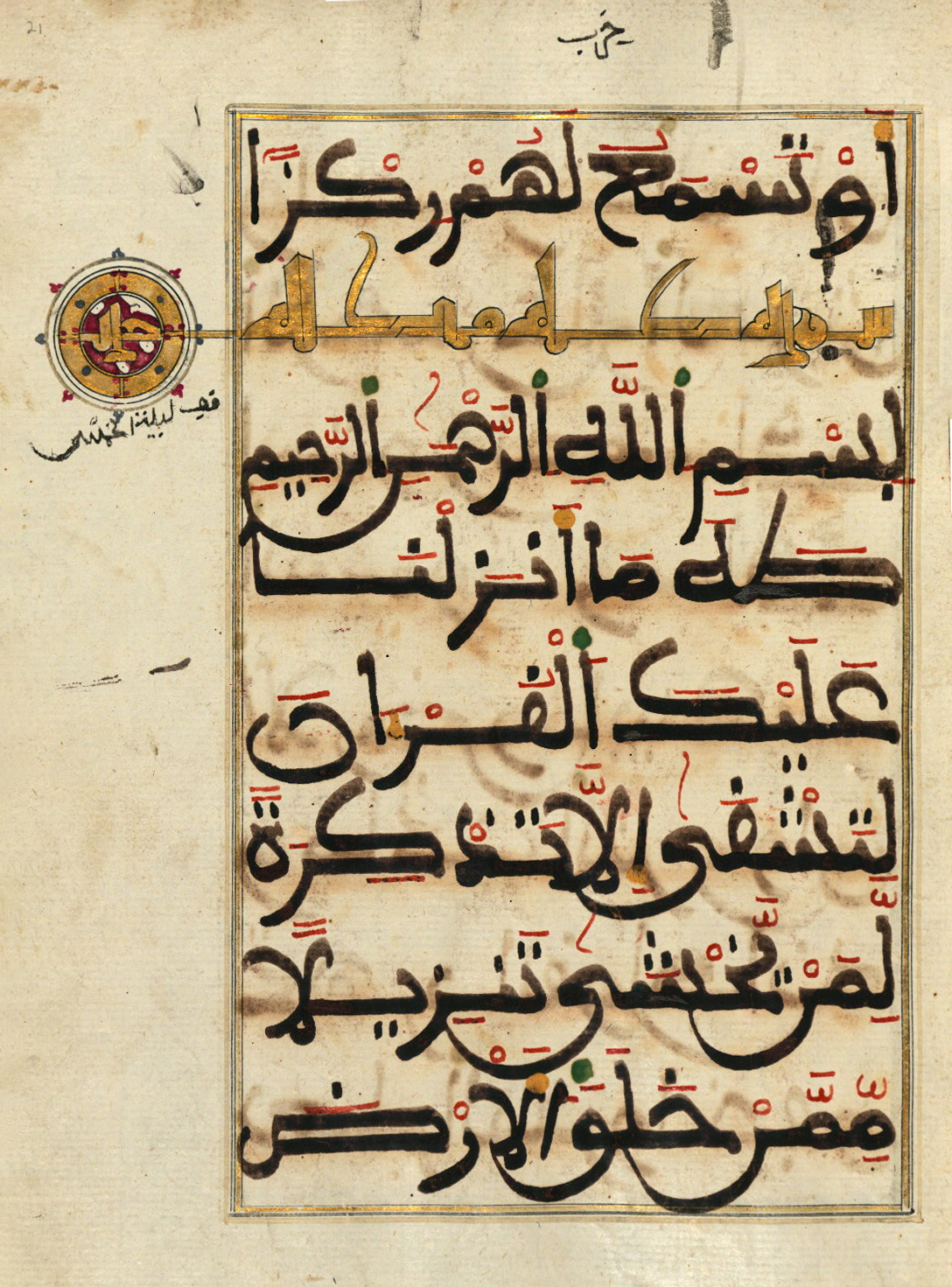
Illuminated Manuscript Koran, Illuminated heading for chapter 20 (Sūrat Tā Hā) with marginal medallion, Walters Art Museum Ms.

Ṭā Hā (/ˈtɑːˈhɑː/; Arabic: طه) is the 20th chapter (sūrah) of the Qur'an with 135 verses (āyāt). It is named "Ṭā Hā" because the chapter starts with the Arabic ḥurūf muqaṭṭaʿāt (disjoined letters) طه (Ṭāhā).

Regarding the timing and contextual background of the revelation (asbāb al-nuzūl), it is traditionally believed to be a Meccan surah, from the second Meccan period (615-619), which means it is believed to have been revealed in Mecca, rather than later in Medina.

Among the subjects treated in this chapter are God's call of Moses (Quran 20:10), the Exodus of the Israelites and the crossing of the Red Sea (20:77), the worship of the Golden Calf (20:88) and the Fall of Man (20:120). The main theme of the chapter is about the existence of God. It addresses this theme through stories about Moses and Adam. Sura 20 displays several thematic and stylistic patterns described by Angelika Neuwirth in Jane McAuliffe's book "The Cambridge Companion to the Qur'an". These include the eschatological prophecies of the Quran, signs of God's existence, and debate. Additionally, sura 20 employs what has been termed the "ring structure" to reinforce its central theme.

This is the chapter that convinced Umar to convert to Islam.

The oldest surviving manuscript containing chapter Ṭā Hā is a Quranic manuscript in the Mingana Collection identified as having been written on the Birmingham Quran manuscript, dated 0-25 AH.

== Summary ==
- 1-3 The Quran an admonition from God to the faithful
- 4-7 God one, a Sovereign King, omniscient, and possessed of most excellent names
- The History of Moses
  - 8-10 He sees the burning bush
  - 11-12 God speaks to him out of the fire
  - 13-14 He is chosen and instructed by God
  - 15-17 The day of judgment will surely come
  - 18-24 God bestows on him signs and miracles
  - 25 He is commanded to go to Pharaoh
  - 26-35 Moses prays for the assistance of Aaron
  - 36-42 God reminds Moses of former favours
  - 43-50 He is sent with Aaron to Pharaoh
  - 51-57 Conversation between Pharaoh and Moses
  - 58-59 Pharaoh rejects Moses and accuses him of imposture
  - 60-62 Pharaoh proposes to meet Moses and Aaron with countermiracles
  - 63-64 Moses warns the magicians against deception
  - 65 The magicians dispute among themselves
  - 66 They counsel Pharaoh against Moses
  - 67 Pharaoh encourages the magicians to do their best
  - 68-72 The contest between Moses and the magicians
  - 73 The magicians are converted
  - 74-75 Pharaoh threatens the magicians with dire punishment
  - 75-76 The magicians defy the wrath of Pharaoh, and express hope in God
  - 77-80 God commands Moses to lead the Israelites through the Red Sea
  - 81 Pharaoh pursues them, and is overwhelmed by the sea
  - 82-83 God feeds the Israelites on manna and quails in the desert
  - 83-84 God's treatment of the unbelieving and penitent
  - 85-87 The Israelites worship a golden calf
  - 88-89 Moses reproaches them with idolatry
  - 90-91 They lay the blame on Samiri
  - 92-93 The people disobey Aaron
  - 94-95 Moses rebukes Aaron—his apology
  - 96 Sámirí's explanation of his conduct 97-98 Sámirí's doom to social ostracism
- 102-107 The resurrection and the conduct of those judged on the judgment-day
- 108 No intercession on that day, except by permission
- 109-111 The fate of the wicked and reward of the righteous
- 112-114 The Quran made easy for Muhammad, but he is not to be hasty in repeating it
- The Story of Adam
  - 115 Adam broke God's covenant
  - 116 All the angels prostrate to Adam except Iblís
  - 117 Adam warned against Satan
  - 118-119 Adam and Eve will never struggle in Jannah
  - 120 Satan beguiles Adam and Eve
  - 121 Adam disobeys God
  - 122-123 God pardons, but expels them from Paradise
  - 124 An admonition promised, with penalty of rejection of it
- 125-127 Infidels will appear in the judgment blind, and reasons for blindness
- 128-129 The Makkans warned
- 130-132 Muhammad comforted and encouraged
- 133-134 The Jews demand a sign, and the Quraish disbelieve
- 135 God directs Muhammad to proclaim his readiness to wait the final issue of the controversy between them

== Structure ==
The first two words of Chapter 20 are Ṭā Hā.

Sura 20 focuses upon one theme, and is structured in such a way as to reinforce this theme repeatedly. Sura 20 begins with an introduction which proclaims the greatness of God. In the body of the sura, there are two distinct stories, one about Moses and one about Adam, each of which is broken into smaller sections. Both stories are prefaced by instructions from God to Muhammad, and followed by a discussion of judgment day and the punishment of the disbelievers. To conclude the sura, there is another section restating and reinforcing the main theme, followed by a brief instruction to Muhammad. This repetitive pattern is what Carl W. Ernst terms the ring structure in his book "How to Read the Qur'an". The first part of the sura, up until the story of Adam, and the second part are, thematically and structurally, copies of each other. The story about Moses gives a much longer, more detailed description to introduce the theme, and the shorter story of Adam serves to summarize and repeat the theme already discussed. The introduction and conclusion paragraphs, including the verses where God addresses Muhammad, are the bookends to the sura, and bind the stories together.

=== 1-8 Introduction ===
This section is an introduction to the sura. It begins with God addressing Muhammad, then lists several of God's characteristics and praises Him. In this section, there is also a mention of the Quran as a reminder of God's existence, a theme that is seen throughout the Quran. One of the two verses in this sura mentioned in al-Wahidi's "Asbab al-Nuzul" is verse 2. According to al-Wahidi, God sent this verse to Muhammad because the Quraysh were saying that Muhammad was distressed because he left their religion, and that God only sent down the Quran to distress Muhammad.

Verses 2–3: "It was not to distress you [Prophet] that We sent down the Qur'an to you, but as a reminder for those who hold God in awe…" Verse 8: "God—There is no god but Him—the most excellent names belong to Him."

=== 9–98 The story of Moses ===
This section recounts the story of Moses's encounter with Pharaoh, and how Moses's people were tested by God. Moses is originally tasked by God to go to Pharaoh, who has erred, and try to show him the right path. Verses 25-28: "He said, my Lord, open up my heart, and make my task easy for me. Loosen the knot in my tongue, so that they may understand my speech."

Moses is triumphant over the Pharaoh because he is helped by God, but is then chased from the land by Pharaoh. After escaping, Moses leaves his people to confer with God. During his absence, his people are led awry by al-Samiri, and begin to worship a golden calf instead of God. Upon his return, Moses is furious. He exiles al-Samiri, and chastises his brother Aaron for allowing the people to worship anything other than the one true God. Samiri's provokation of Moses's disciples to worship a lowly calf beside the Almighty, clearly refuted God's grace as well as Moses and Aaron's preaching. Hence, Samiri's defiance that is quite similar to Iblis' or Satan's had earned him severe punishment from God.

Verse 56: "We showed Pharaoh all Our signs, but he denied them and refused [to change]." Verse 85: "…but God said, 'We have tested your people in your absence: the Samiri has led them astray.'" Verse 97: "(Moses) said: "Get thee gone! but thy (punishment) in this life will be that thou wilt say, 'touch me not'; and moreover (for a future penalty) thou hast a promise that will not fail: Now look at thy god, of whom thou hast become a devoted worshipper: We will certainly (melt) it in a blazing fire and scatter it broadcast in the sea!"

=== 99–113 Judgment day and the disbelievers' punishment ===
This section again refers to the revealed nature of the Quran, and discusses the Day of Judgment. It gives a brief description of the events that will take place on judgment day. Disbelievers will be punished, but believers need not fear. This account of judgment day is an example of the eschatological nature of the Quran, as described by Angelika Neuwirth. Also in this section, in verse 113, is a specific reference to the Quran in Arabic.

Verse 99: "…We have given you a Qur'an from Us." Verses 111–112: "Those burdened with evil deeds will despair, but whoever has done righteous deeds and believed need have no fear of injustice or deprivation." Verse 113: "We have sent the Qur'an down in the Arabic tongue and given all kinds of warnings in it, so that they may beware or it may make them take heed."

=== 114–123 The story of Adam ===
This section begins with a proclamation of God's greatness, and then another address from God to Muhammad. Then, God relates the story of Adam. When God created Adam and asked the angels to bow before him, all but Iblis did bow. Iblis (Satan) was punished and made the enemy of man. Satan tempted Adam, and Adam gave in, straying from God. But, Adam repented for his mistake and asked for God's forgiveness quite devotedly, for which God finally forgave him.

Verse 114: "Exalted be God, the one who is truly in control. [Prophet], do not rush to recite before the revelation is fully complete…" Verse 116: "When We said to the angels, 'Bow down before Adam,' they did. But Iblis refused." Verse 121–122: "…Adam disobeyed his Lord and was led astray—later his lord brought him close, accepted his repentance, and guided him."

=== 123–127 Judgment day and the disbelievers' punishment ===
This section restates what was said before: Those who follow God will be rewarded, and those who do not will be punished on the Day of Judgment.

Verse 126: "…You ignored Our revelations when they came to you, so today you will be ignored." Verse 127: "…The greatest and most enduring punishment is in the Hereafter."

=== 128–132 Instructions to the believers ===
This section contains another of the patterns discussed by Neuwirth, the signs of God's existence. It references the ruins of old cities as signs that God exists and can easily destroy people. Also, this section instructs believers to pray, and not to long for others' possessions. Verse 131 is the second verse of the sura that is mentioned in Asbab al-Nuzul. Wahidi says that this was sent down because Muhammad once desired food to entertain a guest, but could not afford it. The Jewish man selling the food refused to sell it without a security, and Muhammad was furious with this. To appease his prophet, God sent down this verse.

Verse 131: "And do not gaze longingly at what We have given some of them to enjoy, the finery of this present life: We test them through this, but the provision of your Lord is better and more lasting." Verse 132: "Order your people to pray, and pray steadfastly yourself."

=== 133–135 Conclusion ===
The conclusion includes another of the elements Neuwirth discusses: debate. In the conclusion, there is a debate between the disbelievers and Muhammad. The disbelievers wonder why God does not bring them a sign, and in the final verse God instructs Muhammad what to reply to them.

Verse 135: "[Prophet], say, 'We are all waiting, so you carry on waiting: you will come to learn who has followed the even path, and been rightly guided.'"

== See also ==
- Wa qul rabbi zidni ilma
