= An-Nazi'at =

79th chapter of the Qur'an

Surah 79 of the Quran
النازعات An-Nāziʻāt Those Who Pull Out
- Qira'ah; English text
- Classification: Meccan
- Position: Juzʼ 30
- No. of verses: 46
- No. of Rukus: 2
- No. of words: 179
- No. of letters: 763

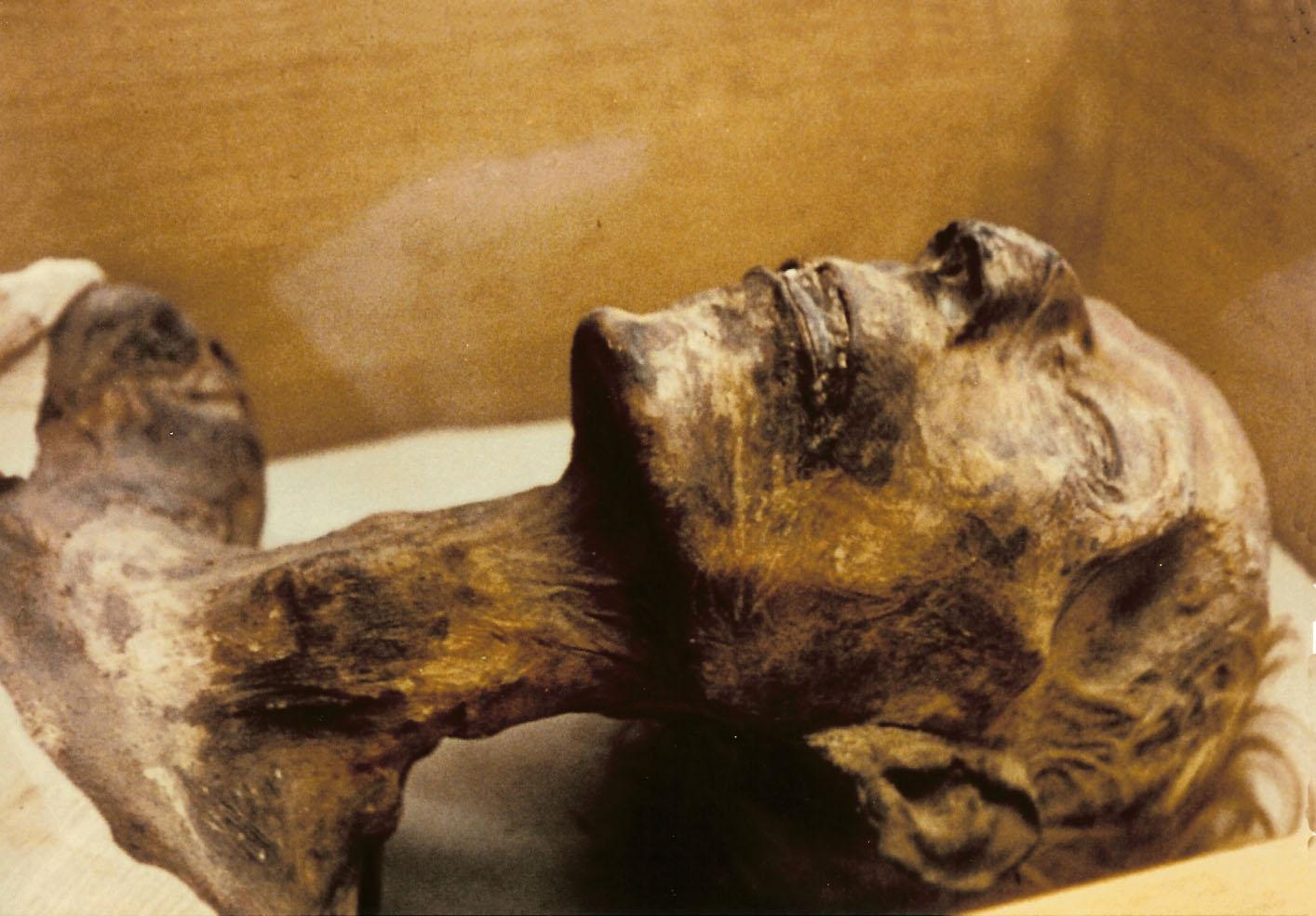
Mummy of Ramesses II

An-Nāziʻāt (Arabic: النازعات, "Those Who Pull Out", in reference to "the angels who tear out the souls of the wicked") is the seventy-ninth sura of the Qur'an, with 46 ayat. Its name derived from the word wan-nazi‘at with which it opens. The root (n-z-‘) roughly means "to yank out with great force", although it can also mean "to yearn for" or "to yearn after".

== Summary ==
1-3 Oaths by the angels of death that there will be a resurrection and judgment-day
4 The preceding narration about the angels tasked in the following verse of 5. The angels with various roles and missions perform their tasks by descending from the sky. Muhammad ibn al-Uthaymeen said the tasks which angels done cannot be done by normal humans.
5 The angels has roles that each of them assigned with certain tasks, such as Israfil, blowing horn of Qiyamah, (Note: According to Islamic belief in weak chain of Hadith, Raphael were acknowledged as angel who were tasked to blower of Armageddon trumpet. Israfil also mentioned by Suyuti as Muezzin among angels, possessed twelve wings, and a member of a group of biggest archangels who bear the Throne of God on their back. However, Abu Bakar al-Hudhali opined the angel who blowing horn were different from Israfil, while Abu Said Al-Khudri nentioned the blower of horn were in fact consisted of two angels, while he supported the opinion that Israfil were also one of the blower.) and Michael, who has been tasked to manage the dews, rains and growing plants, and Maalik, who are tasked to guard the hell while punishing the sinners.
6-7 Oaths by the messengers of death that there will be a resurrection and judgment-day
8-14 Infidels shall be restored to life notwithstanding their unbelief
15-26 The story of Moses and his mission to Pharaoh
27-33 The Creator can raise the dead
34-41 The righteous and the wicked in judgment
42-46 No one knows the time of judgment, but whenever it comes it will be soon for the infidels

== Period of revelation ==
Its subject matter testifies that Sūrat an-Nāziʻāt belongs to the earliest period at Makkah. According to Abdullah bin Abbas, this Surah was sent down before Surah An-Naba, whilst Muḥammad Khaṭīb has opined that surah 79 was revealed around five years before the Hijrah, although other commentators have dated the surah’s revelation at eight years before the Hijrah. Western Qur’an scholar Richard Bell has argued that parts of surah 79, notably the opening verses, may date from a later Meccan period, though this is not generally accepted by other scholars.

== Theme and subject matter ==
This surah's theme is the affirmation of the day of judgment and life hereafter. It also warns of the consequences of belying the Messenger of God.

The Surah opens with oaths sworn by the angels who take the soul at death and those who hasten to carry out Allah’s Commands, and those who conduct the affairs of the universe according to Divine Will, to assure that the Resurrection will certainly come to pass and the second life after death will certainly take place. For the angels who are employed to pluck out the soul today can also be employed to restore the soul tomorrow, and the angels who promptly execute Allah's Commands and conduct the affairs of the universe today can also upset the order of the universe tomorrow by orders of the same God and can also bring about a new order.

After this the people have been told, so as to say: “This work which you regard as absolutely impossible, is not any difficulty for Allah, for which He may have to make lengthy preparations. Just a single jolt will upset this system of the world and a second jolt will be enough to cause you to appear as living beings in the new world. At that time the same people who were wont to deny it, would be trembling with fear and seeing with awestruck eyes all that they thought was impossible.

Then, briefly relating the story of the Prophet Moses and Pharaoh (it is the chronologically earliest sura to do this), the people have been warned to the effect: “You know full well what fate the Pharaoh met in consequence of belying the Messenger and rejecting the guidance brought by him and endeavoring to defeat his mission by trickery and deceit. If you do not learn any lesson from it and do not change your ways and attitude accordingly, you also will have to meet the same fate.

Then, in vv. 27-33, arguments have been given for the Hereafter and life after death. In this regard, the deniers have been asked the question: "Is your resurrection a more difficult task or the creation of the huge Universe which spreads around you to infinite distances with myriads of its stars and planets? Your recreation cannot be difficult for the God for Whom this was an easy task. Thus, after presenting in a single sentence, a decisive argument for the possibility of the Hereafter, attention has been drawn to the earth and its provisions that have been arranged in it for the sustenance of man and animal and of which everything testifies that it has been created with great wisdom for fulfilling some special purpose. Pointing to this the question has been left for the intellect of man to ponder for itself and form the opinion whether calling man to account after having delegated authority and responsibilities to a creature like him in this wise system would be more in keeping with the demands of wisdom, or that he should die after committing all sorts of misdeeds in the world and should perish and mix in the dust forever and should never be called to account as to how he employed the authority and fulfilled the responsibilities entrusted to him. Instead of discussing this question, in vv. 34-41, it has been said: "When the Hereafter is established, men's eternal future will be determined on the criterion as to which of them rebelled against his God transgressing the bounds of service and made the material benefits and pleasures his objective of life and which of them feared standing before his Lord and refrained from fulfilling the unlawful desires of the self." This by itself provides the right answer to the above question to every such person who considers it honestly, free from stubbornness. For the only rational, logical and moral demand of giving authority and entrusting responsibilities to man in the world is that he should be called to account on this very basis ultimately and rewarded or punished accordingly.

In conclusion, the question of the disbelievers of Makkah as to when the Resurrection will take place has been answered. They asked the Prophet this question over and over again. In reply it has been said that the knowledge of the time of its occurrence rests with Allah alone. The Messenger is there only to give the warning that it will certainly come. Now whoever wishes may mend his ways, fearing its coming, and whoever wishes may behave and conduct himself as he likes, fearless of its coming. When the appointed time comes, those very people who loved the life of this world and regarded its pleasures as the only object of life, would feel that they had stayed in the world only for an hour or so. Then they will realize how utterly they had ruined their future forever for the sake of the short lived pleasures of the world.

== See also ==
- Moses in Islam
- Legends and the Qur'an
- Prophets of Islam
- Meccan sura
- Biblical narratives and the Qur'an
