= Haman (Islam) =

Islamic portrayal of Biblical Haman

Hāmān Haman
- هامان
- Born: Ancient Egypt
- Died: Red Sea
- Cause of death: Drowned
- Occupation: Vizier
- Known for: The vizier of Fir'awn at the time of prophet Moses

Haman (Arabic: هامان, romanized: Hāmān) is a person mentioned in the Quran where he appears as court official of the Fir'awn (Pharaoh) and associated with him in his court at the time of prophet Musa (Moses) in Christianity and Judaism.

The name Haman, however, also appears in the biblical Book of Esther where Haman is a counselor of Ahasuerus, king of Persia and an enemy of the Jews. The relationship between the Biblical and Quranic Haman has been a topic of debate. There is no evidence of such stories in Egyptian history. Some Islamic scholars compared plot elements of the Book of Esther when they elaborated on the Quranic narrative of the Exodus.

== Quranic Narrative ==
The name Haman appears six times throughout the Quran, Quran 29:39,40:24, 28:8, 28:38. four times with Pharaoh and twice by himself, where God sends Moses to invite Pharaoh, Haman and their people to monotheism, and to seek protection of the Israelites Haman and Pharaoh were tormenting.

Indeed, Pharaoh arrogantly elevated himself in the land and divided its people into subservient groups, one of which he persecuted, slaughtering their sons and keeping their women. He was truly one of the corruptors. But it was Our Will to favor those who were oppressed in the land, making them models of faith as well as successors;and to establish them in the land; and through them show Pharaoh, Hamân, and their soldiers the fulfillment of what they feared.

— Quran 28:4-6

Referring to Moses as a sorcerer and a liar the Pharaoh rejected Moses' call to worship the God of Moses and refused to set the children of Israel free. The Pharaoh commissioned Haman to build a tall tower using fire-cast bricks so that the Pharaoh could climb far up and see the God of Moses. The Pharaoh, Haman, and their army in chariots pursuing the fleeing children of Israel drowned in the Red Sea as the parted water closed up on them. The Pharaoh's submission to God at the moment of death and total destruction was rejected but his dead body was saved as a lesson for posterity.

== High Priest of Amun ==
Some have proposed that the name Haman, like Pharaoh in the Quran and Old Testament is not a proper name, but a title. The description of Haman in the Quran serving in both a priestly religious role and that of one who's in charge of building projects answerable to the Pharaoh himself draws parallels with the High Priest of Amun.

McAuliffe's Encyclopaedia of the Qurʾān reports multiple possible identifications of the name: Muhammad Asad identifies the name with a supposed Egyptian title Hā-Amen, as a high priest. Georges Vajda thought the name might have been confused with that of a minister of the Biblical Persian king Ahasuerus. Anthony Johns, the author of the encyclopaedia entry, hypothesises that the name of the Biblical Haman may have been adopted to designate any anti-Jewish court official.
