= Az-Zukhruf =

43rd chapter of the Qur'an

Surah 43 of the Quran
الزخرف Az-Zukhruf Ornaments of Gold
- Qira'ah; English text
- Classification: Meccan
- Position: Juzʼ 25
- No. of verses: 89
- No. of Rukus: 7
- No. of words: 939
- No. of letters: 3549

Az-Zukhruf (Arabic: الزخرف, "Ornaments of Gold, Luxury") is the 43rd chapter (surah), of the Quran, the central religious text of Islam. It contains 89 verses (ayat).

Named after the golden ornaments recognized in verse 35 and again in verse 53, this surah dates back to the Second Meccan Period before the Prophet Muhammad’s migration to Medina. According to the Nöldeke Chronology of surahs, the Ornaments of Gold was the 61st surah revealed. The Standard Egyptian chronology, however, acknowledges this as the 63rd surah revealed. Regardless of the exact position in which this surah was revealed, it is clear that the surah was revealed during the Second Meccan Period, a time in which Muhammad and his followers were increasingly subject to opposition from the Quraysh tribe.

Consistent with all of the Surahs of the Quran except At-Tawbah, Ornaments of Gold begins with the Bismillah, or the standard verse ‘In the name of God, the Lord of Mercy, the Giver of Mercy.’

Ornaments of Gold is a Surah that acts as a reminder to believers that the goodness of God cannot be found within wealth and material power. The surah rejects the claim of disbelievers that prophets, leaders and worthy figures should be marked by their riches and thereby empowers them to refrain from temptations, indulgences and distractions. The surah warns disbelievers who succumb to the “mere enjoyments of this life” (Q43:17) of a terrible and tormented afterlife and it encourages believers to relish not in riches but in their faith and love of God. The surah also repeatedly addresses the fact that the angels are not God's daughters but his faithful servants (Q43:19). The possibility of Jesus being the literal son of God is also rejected within verses 63-64.

== Summary ==
- 1-3 Quran is in Arabic and it is preserved by God in the Master Record
- 4-7 Former nations, like the Quraish, rejected the prophets
- 8-14 Idolaters acknowledge God to be creator, yet worship the creature
- 15-18 The Arabs hate female offspring, and yet attribute such to God
- 19-24 Idolaters vainly excuse their unbelief by saying they will follow the religion of their fathers
- 25-27 Abraham rejected the idolatry of his fathers
- 28-29 God prospered the idolatrous Quraish until a prophet came, and now they reject him
- 30-31 The unbelievers rebuked for saying they would have received the Quran from some great man
- 32-34 Poverty only permitted to save men from idolatry
- 35-38 Devils are constituted the companions of infidels, who lead them to destruction
- 39-44 Muhammad exhorted to remain steadfast in faith notwithstanding the unbelief of his countrymen
- 45-56 Moses rejected with contempt by Pharaoh and the Egyptians, who were drowned
- 57-58 The Arab idolaters justified their idolatry by reference to the Christian worship of Jesus
- 59-64 But Jesus did not say he was a god, but was a servant and a prophet of God
- 65-67 Unbelievers warned of approaching judgment
- 68-73 The joys of Paradise reserved for believers and their wives
- 74-78 The damned shall vainly seek relief in annihilation
- 79-80 Angels record the secret plottings of infidels
- 81-82 If God had a son, Muhammad would be the first to worship him
- 83-87 God knoweth the folly of idolaters
- 88-89 Muhammad commanded to turn aside from the unbelieving Quraish

== Themes ==
=== Affirmation of the revelation ===
The surah begins with a strong affirmation of the revelation. Verses 2-4 emphasize the Scripture as being “clear” and “truly exalted and authoritative.” These verses present a pronounced declaration of the truth and certainty of the revelation and also include the first of the two times that the word "Quran" is specifically used throughout the surah. The word ‘qur’an’ is only used 70 times throughout the entirety of the Quran. Quran is a verbal noun in Arabic meaning ‘to recite.’ As it appears in verse 3 and 31 of this surah, it is confirming the Quran as an oral revelation, the spoken word of God recited to Muhammad. The word 'quran' instead of, for example, the word ‘kitab’ (book), reveals not a written but a recited, spoken and oral nature of the Quran.

=== Exaltation of God and divinity of the Quran ===
The Ornaments of Gold ends with a flourish of praise and exaltations of God. “He who is God in heaven and God on Earth; He is the All Wise, the All Knowing” (84). This creates a parallel between the first and third sections of the surah as it also exalts God as “the Almighty, the All Knowing” (9), but also as it praises the words and knowledge of God as the ultimate truth.

=== Debate between the believers and disbelievers ===
The surah continues with a debate between the believers and the disbelievers. These debates, or “polemical utterances… against listeners who do not comply with the behavioral norms of the cult,” are an essential element in the structure of the surahs of the Quran. In verses 5-19 there occurs a debate between the believers and the disbelievers in which the disbelievers are reprimanded for mocking the revelations and the prophets that have generously been sent down to them by God.

=== Afterlife ===
The afterlife, the resurrection of the dead, and Judgement Day are topics of great importance throughout the Qur'an, and they received memorable treatment, particularly in the early Meccan surahs." In the Ornaments of Gold, verses 57 through 89 declare the imminent Judgment Day. “This Quran is knowledge for the Hour: do not doubt it, Follow Me for this is the right path” (61). This section tells of an afterlife for the believers that is full “dishes and goblets of gold” (71), joy and a garden of bountiful fruit to eat (73). It affirms that believers and their spouses will “enter Paradise” (70). Disbelievers, on the other hand, “will suffer the torment of a grievous day” (65). This section can be identified as an eschatological prophecy, a common pattern throughout the surahs of the Quran, including The Ornaments of Gold, that “juxtapose[s] the situation of the believers in the garden of paradise with that of the disbelievers or evildoers suffering in the tribulations of the fire of hell."

=== Angels as daughters ===
Another main theme addressed throughout this surah is the role of the angels as God's servants and not God's daughters. Verses 15-19 discuss the ungrateful disbelievers who consider the angels to be more than just servants of God. "The Meccan pagans considered the angels to be daughters of God, yet they were dismissive of their own daughters". Verses 15-19 reject any familial ties between God and the angels.

The theme of the angels as Gods servants arises again in verses 57–60. Here, the surah once again rejects the pagans who worship the angels as daughters of God and see them as superior to Jesus, whom they believed to be the Christian's Son of God. The angels are merely servants of God and the surah denounces the disbelievers who argue otherwise just to challenge believers.

== Textual notes ==
=== Jesus as the Word of God ===
Verse 60 reads “if it had been Our will, We could have made you angels, succeeding one another one earth.” This once again affirms angels are God's mere servants, subject completely to his command, but it also evokes another important theme- God as the creator. This verse suggests that God has the power to make angels. He has the power to create a human servant who has just a mother and no father, just as Jesus had. It implies that Jesus is not the Son of God but was the creation of the one, true God. Verses 63-64 additionally discuss Jesus, denouncing the divinity he is given as the son of God and emphasizing him as a special servant who was born by the miraculous word of God. “When Jesus came with clear signs he said, ‘I have brought you wisdom; I have come to clear up some of your differences for you. Be mindful of God and obey me: God is my Lord and your Lord. Serve Him: this is the straight path’” (63-64).

=== Source of Scripture ===
This relates back to the beginning of the surah where the Quran is identified as the “Source of Scripture” (4) which can also literally be translated into ‘mother of the Scripture. ’ The Haleem translation of the Qur'an includes that this phrase is also referring to the ‘Preserved Tablet’ that is referenced in Quran 13:39 and 22 as well. This subtle reinterpretation suggests that the Qur'an is the ‘mother’ of and therefore superior to all of the books revelation. It suggests that the Quran is more reliable and possesses more truth than the Torah and the Gospels and it suggests that the Quran should be revered above all revelations that came before it. One interpretation is that this represents a pronounced declaration of the truth and certainty of the revelation and implies that the Quran is not to be worshipped as divine only orally, but also as it is ascribed on the tablets or written on the pages of the Quran. This interpretation suggests that the Quran is a heavenly book, not a human book. The way it was written is to be revered as the true word of God.

Another interpretation of this verse is that the Quran is a unique phenomenon in human history that exists beyond the mundane sphere as the eternal and immutable word of God. Through this interpretation, the Quran is considered an earthly book whose history is intimately linked human life and the history of humanity. It is regarded as “a glorious Qurʿān [preserved] in a well-guarded tablet” (21–22) and is believed to transcend time and space.

=== You and Your Spouses ===
While many Quranic chapters of the Early Meccan periods make references to wide-eyed maidens upon arrival into Paradise, surah 43 explicitly states, "Enter Paradise, you and your spouses: you will be filled with joy" 70). The inclusion of verse 43:70 indicates that this surah was revealed in the later Meccan period at which point there existed an emphasis on family. At the time of this surah's revelation, there was less of a concern convincing Meccan pagans to convert and more of a concern developing a law-abiding community centered upon worshipping God's will.

=== The Most Merciful ===
The divine names Allah and Ar-rahman ('the Most-merciful) occur eight times throughout this surah. Patterns show that these names were absent from the earliest revelations and were introduced and most prominently used during the Second Meccan period. After the Second Meccan period, Ar-rahman was subsequently dropped and the term Allah was used with increasing frequency. This pattern emerges because in the earliest of revelations, God was referred to as Muhammad's Lord (Arabic Rabb). The names Allah and Ar-rahman were introduced when Muhammad began to preach publicly, but the names were both problematic as many pagans of the time believed not only in God but in lesser deities such as the three goddesses whom they regarded as his daughters (43:15-19). Furthermore, belief in Allah during this time period was not accompanied by any moral demands and it was therefore difficult to convince the pagans that Allah was the only God and that they must obey His command.

Additionally, inscriptional evidence has been verified there were monotheists in Palmyra and the Yemen who regarded God as ar-Rahmn but there is no evidence that the name was known in Mecca.

== Biblical references ==
=== Abraham ===
Verses 20-80 of this surah introduce Abraham by way of a narrative of salvation history- a narrative that presents “excerpts of messages from the ‘book’ which, in turn, is clearly understood to be a corpus of literature apart from the rest of the known stories currently available through known tradition." Narratives of salvation history can be clearly identified by their distinct linguistic styles, new messages of imminent catastrophe, and their unique structure, which reflects that of a monotheistic liturgical service centered around the reading of the scriptures.

This salvation history introduces Abraham as having rejected the way his father and his people worshipped and embraced the truth of God. Those who rejected the message of God were consumed with “golden ornaments… mere enjoyments of this life” (43:35). The disbelievers of the narrative pose the question, “why was this Qur’an not sent down to a powerful [wealthy] man, from either of the two cities?” (43:31). The surah continues to affirm that God preferred to deliver His message to those who He taught Himself and who believed in Him, not to those who had material wealth. If wealth and power were of real value and the true reward, God would not have bestowed them upon the disbelievers and hypocrites. This narrative of salvation history also speaks of the rewards and punishments earned by the believers and disbelievers that God reserves for them in the “next life” (43:35), referring to the Hereafter or the Judgment Day.

=== Moses ===
Another narrative of salvation history is marked by lines 46-80 which introduce Moses as a messenger and servant of God bearing no “gold bracelets” (43:53) and possessing no verifiable power and who attempts to enlighten the Pharaoh and the Kingdom of Egypt to the right path to God. Neither the people nor the Pharaoh were persuaded by a poor and powerless Moses and as they rejected God, they were punished and drowned and made into a lesson for following disbelievers. This narrative of salvation history reveals that worldly gains are not proof of a righteous or unrighteous life and that wealth is more often blinding and harmful than it is helpful. The narrative suggests that these riches are bestowed upon humanity as a test for which they will ultimately be questioned for come Judgment Day. This is structured very similarly to a lesson as one would hear in a monotheistic liturgical service and additionally addresses the coming of the Hour (43:63), or the Judgment Day.
