= Ruku (Quran) =

Quran component

A rukūʿ (Arabic: رُكوع, [rʊˈkuːʕ]) is a paragraph of the Quran. There are either 540 or 558 rukus in the Quran, depending on the authority.

The term rukūʿ — roughly translated as "passage", "pericope" or "stanza" — is used to denote a group of thematically related verses in the Quran. The longer chapters of the Qur'an are divided into several rukūʿs, so readers can identify when to stop or pause, without breaking an ongoing topic in the text.

== See also ==
- Ayah
- Juz'
- Ruku (part of the Islamic act of worship)
