= List of chapters in the Quran =

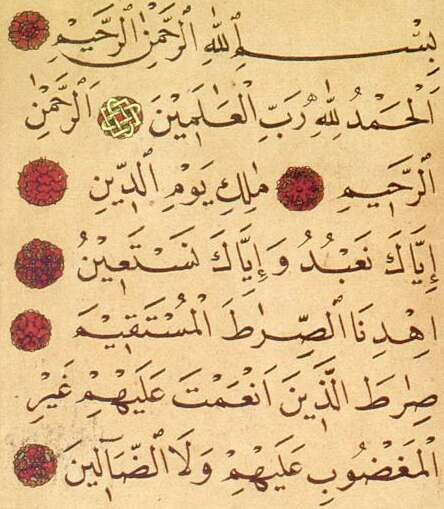
Al-Fatiha, the first surah in the Quran

The Quran consists of 114 chapters, called surahs (Arabic: سُورَة, romanized: sūrah; pl. سُوَر, suwar) and around 6,200 verses (depending on school of counting) called ayahs (Arabic: آية, Arabic pronunciation: [ʔaː.ja]; plural: آيات ʾāyāt). Chapters are arranged broadly in descending order of length. For a preliminary discussion about the chronological order of chapters, see Surah.

Each surah except the ninth (al-Tawba) is preceded by a formula known as the basmala or tasmiah, which reads bismi-llāhi r-raḥmāni r-raḥīm ("In the name of Allah, the Most Gracious, the Most Merciful."). In twenty-nine surahs, this is followed by a group of letters called "muqaṭṭa'āt" (lit. "abbreviated" or "shortened"), unique combinations of a few letters whose meaning are unknown.

The table in this article follows the Kufic school of counting verses, which is the most popular today and has the total number of verses at 6,236.

== Table of surahs ==
#	Anglicized title(s)	Arabic title(s)	English title(s)	Number of verses (Number of Rukūʿs)	Place of Revelation	Egyptian Standard Chronological Order	Nöldeke's Chronological Order	Muqatta'at (isolated letters)	Title refers to	Main theme(s)	Juz'
1	Al-Fatiha (Al-Hamd) (Al-Asas) (Al-Sab' al-Mathani)	ٱلْفَاتِحَة al-Fātiḥah ٱلْحَمْد al-Ḥamd ٱلْأَسَاس al-ʾAsās ٱلسّبْعُ الْمَثَانِي al-Sabʿ al-Mathānī	The Opening, the Opening of the Divine Writ, The Essence of the Divine Writ, The Surah of Praise, The Foundation of the Quran, and The Seven Oft-Repeated [Verses]	7 (1)	Makkah	5	48		Whole Surah	The fundamental principles of the Quran in a condensed form.; It reads: “(1) In the name of God (Allah), the Compassionate and Merciful. (2) Praise be to God, Lord of the worlds, (3) the Compassionate and Merciful, (4) Master of the Day of Judgement. (5) Thee we worship and from Thee we seek help.	1
2	Al-Baqara	ٱلْبَقَرَة al-Baqarah	The Cow, The Female Cow	286 (40)	Madinah	87	91	Alif Lam Mim	v. 67-73	The necessity of God-consciousness.; The error(s) committed by followers of earlier revelations.; Legal ordinances (ethics, social relations, warfare etc.).; AL-BAQARAH (the Cow) has been so named from the story of the Cow occurring in this Surah (vv. 67-73).[5]; Ibrahim.; Kaaba.; Ayatul Kursi. (v. 255)	1-3
3	Al 'Imran	آلِ عِمْرَان ʾĀli ʿImrān	The Family of Imran, The House of ʿImrān	200 (20)	Madinah	89	97	Alif Lam Mim	v. 33, 35	The human nature of Isa.; The oneness of Allah.; Man's faith and temptations.; The Battle of Uhud (3 AH).; Imran in Islam is regarded as the father of Mary. This chapter is named after the family of Imran, which includes Imran, Saint Anne (wife of Imran), Mary, and Jesus	3-4
4	An-Nisa	ٱلنِّسَاء an-Nisāʾ	The Women	176 (24)	Madinah	92	100		Whole Surah	Unity of the human race and the mutual obligations of men and women towards one another. (v. 1); Rights of women.; Questions related to family life (including marriage and inheritance).; Peace and war.; Relations of believers with unbelievers.; Striving in the Cause of Allah (Jihad). (v. 95–97)	4-6
5	Al-Ma'ida (Al-'Uqud)	ٱلْمَائِدَة al-Māʾidahٱلْعُقُود al-ʿUqūd	The Table, The Last Supper, The Contracts	120 (16)	Madinah	112	114		v. 112-114	A series of ordinances (incl. Religious rites and social obligations).; Corruption of the original message of the Injeel by Jews and Christians. (v. 68–77, 116–118)	6-7
6	Al-An'am	ٱلْأَنْعَام al-ʾAnʿām	The Cattle, The Grazing Livestock	165 (20)	Makkah	55	89		v. 136.	Human nature of Muhammad. (v. 50); Oneness and uniqueness of Allah. (e.g. v. 100, 103); Pre-Islamic superstitions concerning animals. (v. 136)	7-8
7	Al-A'raf	ٱلْأَعْرَاف al-ʾAʿrāf	The Heights, The Faculty of Discernment	206 (24)	Makkah	39	87	Alif Lam Mim Sad	v. 46, 48	The mission of the prophets.; Adam, Hawwa and Iblis. (v. 16–25); Stories of Nuh, Hud, Salih, Lut, Shuáyb and Musa. (v. 59–171); Allah's Covenant with humanity. (v. 172); What happens to those who discard Allah's message. (v. 175)	8-9
8	Al-Anfal (Badr)	ٱلْأَنْفَال al-ʾAnfālبَدْر; Badr	The Spoils of War, Badr	75 (10)	Madinah	88	95		v. 1	The Battle of Badr (2 A.H.).; Doctrine of sacrifice through action.	9-10
9	At-Tawba (Bara'a)	ٱلتَّوْبَة at-Tawbahبَرَاءَة; Barāʾah	Repentance, Dissociation, Immunity	129 (16)	Madinah	113	113			Problems of war between believers and their enemies.; The expedition to Tabuk (9 A.H.).; Prohibition of intercalation in the Islamic lunar calendar(v. 37); Those who cannot attain to faith. (v. 124–127)	10-11
10	Yunus	يُونُس; Yūnus	Jonah	109 (11)	Makkah	51	84	Alif Lam Ra	v. 98	The revelation of the Quran to Muhammad (not Muhammad's own work). (v. 15–17, 37–38, 94); References to earlier prophets.; Fundamental tenets of Islam.	11
11	Hud	هُود; Hūd	Hud	123 (10)	Makkah	52	75	Alif Lam Ra	v. 50-60	The revelation of God's will through his prophets.; More stories of earlier prophets.; Just dealings between men.	11-12
12	Yusuf	يُوسُف; Yūsuf	Joseph	111 (12)	Makkah	53	77	Alif Lam Ra	Whole Surah	The story of the Islamic prophet Joseph (as an illustration of God's unfathomable direction of men's affairs).	12-13
13	Ar-Ra'd	ٱلرَّعْد ar-Raʿd	The Thunder	43 (6)	Madinah	96	90	Alif Lam Mim Ra	v. 13	God's revelation, through his prophets, of certain fundamental moral truths, and the consequences of accepting or rejecting them.	13
14	Ibrahim	إِبْرَاهِيم ʾIbrāhīm	Abraham	52 (7)	Makkah	72	76	Alif Lam Ra	v. 35-41	The revelation of God's word to all mankind, destined to lead man from darkness to light.	13
15	Al-Hijr	ٱلْحِجْر al-Ḥijr	The Rocky Tract, The Stoneland, The Rock City, Hegra	99 (6)	Makkah	54	57	Alif Lam Ra	v. 80	God's guidance to man through revelation of the Quran, which will remain uncorrupted for all times. (v. 9)	14
16	An-Nahl	ٱلنَّحْل an-Naḥl	The Bees	128 (16)	Makkah	70	73		v. 68-69	God's creativeness: Manifested in the instincts of the bee.; Culmination: Guidance through his revealed word.	14
17	Al-Isra (Bani Israil)	اٌلاِسْرٰاء Al-Isrā' بَنِي إِسْرَائِيلBanī ʾIsrāʾīl	The Night Journey, Children of Israel, The Children of Israel	111 (12)	Makkah	50	67		v.1	Muhammad's Night journey from Mecca to Jerusalem.; The children of Israel. (v. 2–8, 101–104)	15
18	Al-Kahf	ٱلْكَهْف al-Kahf	The Cave	110 (12)	Makkah	69	69		v. 13-20	A series of parables or allegories on the theme of faith in God versus excessive attachment to the life of this world. Including: The men of the cave. (v. 13–20); The rich man and the poor man. (v. 32–44); Moses and the unnamed sage. (v. 60–82); The allegory of Dhu'l-Qarnayn, the Two-Horned One’. (v. 83–98)	15-16
19	Maryam	مَرْيَم; Maryam	Mary	98 (6)	Makkah	44	58	Kaf Ha Ya 'Ayn Sad	v. 16-37	The story of Zachariah and his son John, the precursor of Jesus. (v. 2–15); The story of Mary and Jesus. (v. 16–37)	16
20	Ta-Ha (Al-Kalim)	طه; Ṭāʾ Hāʾٱلْكَلِيم al-Kalīm	Ṭāʾ Hāʾ, The Interlocutor	135 (8)	Makkah	45	55	Ta Ha (Note: 'Ta Ha' has also been interpreted as the invocation 'O man'. In this case, it is not counted as a Muqatta'at. Asad 1980, Footnote to the verse.)	v. 1	The guidance offered by God through his prophets.; The fundamental truths inherent in all revealed religions are identical.; The story of Moses. (v. 9-98)	16
21	Al-Anbiya	ٱلْأَنْبِيَاء al-ʾAnbiyāʾ	The Prophets	112 (7)	Makkah	73	65		v. 48-91	The oneness, uniqueness and transcendence of God.; The continuity and intrinsic unity of all divine revelation.; Stories of the prophets of old. (v. 48–91); The believers of all faiths belong to one single community. (v. 92)	17
22	Al-Hajj	ٱلْحَجّ al-Ḥajj	The Pilgrimage, The Hajj	78 (10)	Madinah	103	107		v. 25-38	The Mecca pilgrimage and some of the rituals connected with it. (v. 25–38)	17
23	Al-Mu'minun	ٱلْمُؤْمِنُون al-Muʾminūn	The Believers	118 (6)	Makkah	74	64		v. 1	True faith.; The evidence of the existence of an almighty Creator, and man's ultimate responsibility before Him.; The unity of all religious communities, broken by man's egotism, greed and striving after power. (v. 52–53); The impossibility to believe in God, without believing in life after death.	18
24	An-Nur	ٱلنُّور an-Nūr	The Light	64 (9)	Madinah	102	105		v. 35	Mutual relations and ethical rules between men and women.; The mystic parable of the ‘light of God’ ("Verse of Light"). (v. 35)	18
25	Al-Furqan	ٱلْفُرْقَان al-Furqān	The Criterion, The Standard, The Standard of True and False	77 (6)	Makkah	42	66		v. 1	The purpose of every divine revelation is to provide a stable criterion of true and false.; The humanness of every apostle sent by God to man. (v. 20); Divine revelation belongs to God's creative activity.	18-19
26	Ash-Shu'ara	ٱلشُّعَرَاء aš-Šuʿarāʾ	The Poets	227 (11)	Makkah	47	56	Ta Sin Mim	v. 224	Man's weakness, which causes him to reject God's message and worship power and wealth etc.	19
27	An-Naml (Sulayman)	ٱلنَّمْل an-Namlسُلَيْمَان; Sulaymān	The Ant	93 (7)	Makkah	48	68	Ta Sin	v. 18	The king and prophet(Sulayman) Solomon and queen of Sheba.	19-20
28	Al-Qasas	ٱلْقَصَص al-Qaṣaṣ	The Narrations, The Stories, The Tales	88 (9)	Makkah	49	79	Ta Sin Mim	v. 25	Human aspects of the life of Moses.	20
29	Al-Ankabut	ٱلْعَنْكَبُوت al-ʿAnkabūt	The Spider	69 (7)	Makkah	85	81	Alif Lam Mim	v. 41	The parable of ‘the spider house’, a symbol of false beliefs that are destined to be blown away by the winds of truth. (v. 41)	20-21
30	Ar-Rum	ٱلرُّوم ar-Rūm	Rome, Byzantium, The Romans, The Greeks	60 (6)	Makkah	84	74	Alif Lam Mim	v. 2	Predictions of the near victory of the east Romans [over the Persians] and the Battle of Badr (2 A.H.). (v. 1–7); God's ability to resurrect the dead at the end of time, and the people's ignorance of this.	21
31	Luqman	لُقْمَان; Luqmān	Luqman	34 (4)	Makkah	57	82	Alif Lam Mim	v. 12-19	The story of Luqman, a legendary sage, counselling his son. (v. 12–19)	21
32	As-Sajda (Al-Madaji')	ٱلسَّجْدَة as-Sajdahٱلْمَضَاجِع al-Maḍājiʿ	The Prostration, The Beds	30 (3)	Makkah	75	70	Alif Lam Mim	v. 15	God's creation.; God's revelation and man's acceptance or denial.; The Day of Judgement.	21
33	Al-Ahzab	ٱلْأَحْزَاب al-ʾAḥzāb	The Clans, The Confederates, The Combined Forces	73 (9)	Madinah	90	103		v. 9-27	The War of the Confederates (5 A.H.). (v. 9-27); The relationship between Muhammad and his family.	21-22
34	Saba	سَبَأ; Sabaʾ	Sheba, The City of Sheba	54 (6)	Makkah	58	85		v. 15-20	The insignificance of the knowledge accessible to man. (v. 9); The story of the people of Sheba, as an example of the impermanence of human power, wealth and glory. (v. 15–20); Always be conscious of God. (v. 46)	22
35	Fatir (Al-Mala'ika)	فَاطِر; Fāṭirٱلْمَلَائِكَة al-Malāʾikah	The Originator, The Angels, The Creator of Angels	45 (5)	Makkah	43	86		v. 1	God's power to create and resurrect.; God's revelation of his will through his prophets.	22
36	Ya-Sin	يس; Yāʾ Sīn	Yāʾ Sīn	83 (5)	Makkah	41	60	Yaseen (Note: 'Ya Sin' has also been interpreted as the invocation 'O thou human being'. In this case, it is not counted as a Muqatta'at. Asad 1980, Footnote to the verse.)	v. 1	Man's moral responsibility, resurrection and God's judgment.; To be recited over the dying and in the prayers of the dead.	22-23
37	As-Saffat	ٱلصَّافَّات aṣ-Ṣāffāt	Those Who Set The Ranks, Drawn Up In Ranks, Those Ranged in Ranks	182 (5)	Makkah	56	50		v. 1	Resurrection and the certainty that all human beings will have to answer before God.; Man's constant need of prophetic guidance.; Stories of earlier prophets. (v. 75–148)	23
38	Sad (Dawud)	ص Ṣādدَاوُد; Dāwūd	Ṣād, David	88 (5)	Makkah	38	59	Sad	v. 1	Divine guidance and its rejection by those who are lost in fast pride.	23
39	Az-Zumar (Al-Ghuraf)	ٱلزُّمَر az-Zumarٱلْغُرَف al-Ghuraf	The Crowds, The Troops, The Chambers	75 (8)	Makkah	59	80		v. 71, 73	The evidence of the existence and oneness of God in all manifestations of nature.; God forgives all sins to him who repents before his death.; Allegories of the Last Hour and the Day of Judgment.	23-24
40	Ghafir (Al-Muʼmin)	غَافِر; Ghafirٱلْمُؤْمِن al-Muʾmin	The Forgiver (God), Forgiving, The Believer	85 (9)	Makkah	60	78	Ha Mim	v. 3	Man's false pride, worship of false values (wealth, power etc.) and his denial of divine guidance.; Stories of earlier prophets.	24
41	Fussilat (Al-Masabih)	فُصِّلَت; Fuṣṣilatٱلْمَصَابِيح al-Maṣābīḥ	Expounded, Explained In Detail, Clearly Spelled Out, The Lamps	54 (6)	Makkah	61	71	Ha Mim	v. 3	Man's acceptance or rejection of divine revelation.	24-25
42	Ash-Shura (Ha Mim 'Ayn Sin Qaf)	ٱلشُّورىٰ aš-Šūrāحم عسق; Ḥāʾ Mīm 'Ayn Sīn Qāf	The Consultation, Ḥāʾ Mīm ʿAyn Sīn Qāf	53 (5)	Makkah	62	83	Ha Mim 'Ayn Sin Qaf	v. 36	God is undefinable and unfathomable. (v. 11, 16); All prophets taught the oneness of God, so all believers of all ‘denominations’ should see themselves as ‘one single community’. (v. 13, 15); The law of cause and effect: In the life to come man will only harvest ‘what his own hands have wrought’ in this world.	25
43	Az-Zukhruf	ٱلزُّخْرُف az-Zukhruf	The Gold Adornments, The Ornaments of Gold, The Luxury	89 (7)	Makkah	63	61	Ha Mim	v. 35	To equal anyone or anything with God is sprititually destructive and logically unacceptable.; People's blind adherence to the faith of their forefathers. (v. 22–23)	25
44	Ad-Dukhan	ٱلدُّخَان ad-Dukhān	The Smoke	59 (3)	Makkah	64	53	Ha Mim	v. 10	Through revelation worldly pride is eventually brought to naught.	25
45	Al-Jathiya (Al-Shari'a)	ٱلْجَاثِيَة al-Jāthiyahٱلشَّرِيعَة aš-Šarīʿah	The Kneeling Down, The Crouching, The Sharia	37 (4)	Makkah	65	72	Ha Mim	v. 28	The humility with which all human beings will face their final judgment on resurrection. (v. 28)	25
46	Al-Ahqaf	ٱلْأَحْقَاف al-ʾAḥqāf	Winding Sand-tracts, The Dunes, The Sand-Dunes, The Wind-Curved Sand Hills	35 (4 1/2)	Makkah	66	88	Ha Mim	v. 21	Warning the disbelievers of their miserable fate, and reassuring the believers of their salvation.	25
47	Muhammad (Al-Qital)	مُحَمَّد; Muḥammadٱلْقِتَال al-Qitāl	Muhammad, The Combat, The Warfare	38 (4)	Madinah	95	96		v. 2	Fighting (qital) in God's cause.; Instructions for Muslims to be virtuous to their parents.; The Story of Hud and the punishment of that befell his people.; Advising Muhammad to be more patient in delivering Islam	25
48	Al-Fath	ٱلْفَتْح al-Fatḥ	The Victory	29 (4 1/2)	Madinah	111	108		v. 1	The Truce of Hudaybiyyah (6 A.H.).	26
49	Al-Hujurat	ٱلْحُجُرَات al-Ḥujurāt	The Private Apartments, The Inner Apartments	18 (2 1/2)	Madinah	106	112		v. 4	Social ethics.; Reverence to Muhammad and the righteous leaders after him.; The brotherhood of all believers and all mankind. (v. 10, 13); The difference between true faith and outward observance of religious formalities. (v. 14 ff.)	26
50	Qaf (Al-Basiqat)	ق Qāfٱلْبَاسِقَات al-Bāsiqāt	Qāf, The Tall Ones	45 (3)	Makkah	34	54	Qaf	v. 1	Death and resurrection.; God is closer to man than his neck-vein. (v. 16)	26
51	Adh-Dhariyat	ٱلذَّارِيَات aḏ-Ḏāriyāt	The Wind That Scatter, The Winnowing Winds, The Dust-Scattering Winds	60 (2 1/2)	Makkah	67	39		v. 1	Destruction of those who denied the messengers, and a warning for those who deny the truth.	26-27
52	At-Tur	ٱلطُّور aṭ-Ṭūr	The Mount, Mount Sinai	49 (2 1/2)	Makkah	76	40		v. 1		27
53	An-Najm	ٱلنَّجْم an-Najm	The Star, The Piercing Star, The Unfolding	62 (2 1/2)	Makkah	23	28		v. 1	Muhammad's experience of an ascension to heaven (Mi’raj, including his vision of the Sidrat al-Muntaha, the Lote-Tree of the Extremity). (v. 13–18)	27
54	Al-Qamar (Iqtarabat)	ٱلْقَمَر al-Qamarٱقْتَرَبَت ʾIqtarabat	The Moon, Approached	55 (2 1/2)	Makkah	37	49		v. 1		27
55	Ar-Rahman	ٱلرَّحْمَٰن ar-Raḥmān	The Most Merciful, The Most Gracious, The Beneficent	78 (3)	Madinah	97	43		v. 1	Everything will pass away, except the face of God. (v. 26–27); Description of paradise. (v. 46–78)	27
56	Al-Waqi'a	ٱلْوَاقِعَة al-Wāqiʿah	The Inevitable, The Event, That Which Must Come to Pass	96 (3 1/2)	Makkah	46	41		v. 1	Description of life in the Hereafter for the believers and the disblievers.	27
57	Al-Hadid	ٱلْحَدِيد al-Ḥadīd	Iron	29 (4)	Madinah	94	99		v. 25		27
58	Al-Mujadila (Al-Zihar)	ٱلْمُجَادِلَة al-Mujādilahٱلظِّهَار aẓ-Ẓihār	The Pleading Woman, The Backs, The Zihar	22 (3 1/2)	Madinah	105	106		v. 1	Divorce.; Faith and denial.; Hypocrisy.; The attitude believers should have toward non-believers.	28
59	Al-Hashr	ٱلْحَشْر al-Ḥašr	The Mustering, The Gathering, Exile, Banishment	24 (3 1/2)	Madinah	101	102		v. 2	The conflict between the Muslim coummunity and the Jewish tribe of Banu’n-Nadir of Medina.	28
60	Al-Mumtahana	ٱلْمُمْتَحَنَة al-Mumtaḥanah	The Examined One, She That Is To Be Examined	13 (2 1/2)	Madinah	91	110		v. 10	The believers’ relations with unbelievers.	28
61	As-Saff (Al-Hawariyyin)	ٱلصَّفّ aṣ-Ṣaffٱلْحَوَارِيِّين al-Ḥawāriyyīn	The Ranks, Battle Array, The Apostles	14 (1 1/2)	Madinah	109	98		v. 4	A call to unity between professed belief and actual behaviour.	28
62	Al-Jumu'a	ٱلْجُمُعَة al-Jumuʿah	Congregation, Friday, Friday prayer	11 (1 1/2)	Madinah	110	94		v. 9-10	Obligatory congregational prayer on Friday.	28
63	Al-Munafiqun	ٱلْمُنَافِقُون al-Munāfiqūn	The Hypocrites	11 (1 1/2)	Madinah	104	104		Whole Surah	Hypocrisy.	28
64	At-Taghabun	ٱلتَّغَابُن at-Taghābun	The Cheating, The Mutual Disillusion, The Mutual Loss and Gain, Loss and Gain	18 (2)	Madinah	108	93		v. 9		28
65	At-Talaq	ٱلطَّلَاق aṭ-Ṭalāq	Divorce	12 (2)	Madinah	99	101		Whole Surah	Divorce (waiting period, remarriage).	28
66	At-Tahrim (Lima Tuharrim)	ٱلتَّحْرِيم at-Taḥrīmلِمَ تُحَرِّم; Lima tuḥarrim	The Prohibition, Why do you prohibit?	12 (2)	Madinah	107	109		v. 1	Certain aspects of Muhammad's personal and family life.	28
67	Al-Mulk (Tabarak)	ٱلْمُلْك al-Mulkتَبَارَك; Tabārak	The Dominion, The Sovereignty, The Kingship, Blessed, Supreme Power	30 (1 1/2)	Makkah	77	63		v. 1	Man's inability to understand the mysteries of the universe, and his dependence on guidance through divine revelation.; The manifestation of Gods' absolute perfection in creation through the fine tuning of the universe.	29
68	Al-Qalam (Nun)	ٱلْقَلَم al-Qalamن; Nūn	The Pen, Nūn	52 (2)	Makkah	2	18	Nun	v. 1		29
69	Al-Haqqa	ٱلْحَاقَّة al-Ḥāq̈q̈ah	The Sure Reality, The Laying-Bare of the Truth, The Reality	52 (2)	Makkah	78	38		v. 1		29
70	Al-Ma'arij (Sa'ala Sa'il)	ٱلْمَعَارِج al-Maʿārijسَأَلَ سَائِل; Saʾala sāʾil	The Ways of Ascent, The Ascending Stairways, An asker asked	44 (1 1/2)	Makkah	79	42		v. 3	The unwillingness to believe, caused by the restlessness inherent in human nature.	29
71	Nuh	نُوح; Nūḥ	Noah	28 (1 1/2)	Makkah	71	51		Whole Surah	The story of Noah.; The struggle against blind materialism and the lack of spiritual values.	29
72	Al-Jinn (Al-Wahy)	ٱلْجِنّ al-Jinnٱلْوَحْي al-Waḥy	The Jinn, The Spirits, The Unseen Beings, The Revelation	28 (2)	Makkah	40	62		v. 1		29
73	Al-Muzzammil	ٱلْمُزَّمِّل al-Muzzammil	The Enfolded One, The Enshrouded One, Bundled Up, The Enwrapped One	20 (1 1/2)	Makkah	3	23		v. 1	Loosening the strict regulation on night prayer.	29
74	Al-Muddaththir	ٱلْمُدَّثِّر al-Muddaththir	The One Wrapped Up, The Cloaked One, The Man Wearing A Cloak, The Enfolded One	56 (2)	Makkah	4	2		v. 1	This short early surah outlines almost all fundamental Quranic concepts.; Gods' promise of eternal damnation for the disbelievers.	29
75	Al-Qiyama	ٱلْقِيَامَة al-Q̈iyamah	Resurrection, The Day of Resurrection, Rising Of The Dead	40 (1)	Makkah	31	36		v. 1	The concept of resurrection.	29
76	Al-Insan (Ad-Dahr)	ٱلْإِنْسَان al-ʾInsān	The Human, Man	31 (2)	Madinah	98	52		v. 1		29
77	Al-Mursalat	ٱلْمُرْسَلَات al-Mursalāt	Those Sent Forth, The Emissaries, Winds Sent Forth	50 (1 1/2)	Makkah	33	32		v. 1	The gradual revelation of the Quran.	29
78	An-Naba ('Amma)	ٱلنَّبَأ an-Nabaʾعَمَّ ʿAmma	The Great News, The Announcement, The Tidings, About what?	40 (1 1/2)	Makkah	80	33		v. 2	Life after death.; Resurrection and God's ultimate judgment.	30
79	An-Nazi'at (As-Sahira)	ٱلنَّازِعَات an-Nāziʿātٱلسَّاهِرَة al-Sāhirah	Those Who Tear Out, Those Who Drag Forth, Soul-snatchers, Those That Rise, The Watchful, The Sleepless, The Alert	46 (1 1/2)	Makkah	81	31		v. 1		30
80	Abasa (As-Safara)	عَبَسَ ʿAbasaٱلسَّفَرَة as-Safarah	He Frowned, The Messenger-Angels, The Journeyers	42 (1)	Makkah	24	17		v. 1		30
81	At-Takwir	ٱلتَّكْوِير at-Takwīr	The Folding Up, The Overthrowing, Shrouding in Darkness	29 (1)	Makkah	7	27		v. 1	The Last Hour and man's resurrection.	30
82	Al-Infitar	ٱلْإِنْفِطَار al-ʾInfiṭār	The Cleaving Asunder, Bursting Apart	19 (1/2)	Makkah	82	26		v. 1		30
83	Al-Mutaffifin	ٱلْمُطَفِّفِين al-Muṭaffifīn	The Dealers in Fraud, Defrauding, The Cheats, Those Who Give Short Measure	36 (1)	Makkah	86	37		v. 1		30
84	Al-Inshiqaq	ٱلْإِنْشِقَاق al-ʾInšiq̈āq̈	The Rending Asunder, The Sundering, Splitting Open, The Splitting Asunder	25 (1)	Makkah	83	29		v. 1		30
85	Al-Buruj	ٱلْبُرُوج al-Burūj	The Mansions Of The Stars, The Constellations, The Great Constellations	22 (1)	Makkah	27	22		v. 1		30
86	At-Tariq	ٱلطَّارِق aṭ-Ṭāriq̈	The Night-Visitant, The Morning Star, The Nightcomer, That Which Comes in the Night	17 (1/2)	Makkah	36	15		v. 1		30
87	Al-A'la	ٱلْأَعْلَىٰ al-ʾAʿlā	The Most High, The Highest, The All-Highest, Glory To Your Lord In The Highest	19 (1/2)	Makkah	8	19		v. 1		30
88	Al-Ghashiya	ٱلْغَاشِيَة al-Ghāšiyah	The Overwhelming, The Overwhelming Event, The Overshadowing, The Pall	26 (1)	Makkah	68	34		v. 1		30
89	Al-Fajr	ٱلْفَجْر al-Fajr	The Break of Day, The Daybreak, The Dawn	30 (1)	Makkah	10	35		v. 1		30
90	Al-Balad	ٱلْبَلَد al-Balad	The City, The Land, The Soil	20 (1/2)	Makkah	35	11		v. 1		30
91	Ash-Shams	ٱلشَّمْس aš-Šams	The Sun	15 (1/2)	Makkah	26	16		v. 1		30
92	Al-Layl	ٱللَّيْل al-Layl	The Night	21 (1/2)	Makkah	9	10		v. 1		30
93	Ad-Dhuha	ٱلضُّحَىٰ aḍ-Ḍuḥā	The Morning Hours	11 (1/2)	Makkah	11	13		v. 1	Man's suffering and God's justice.; A message of hope and consolation is given to man from Allah's past mercies.; Man is bidden to pursue the path of goodness and proclaim the bounties of Allah.; Prophecy regarding the good future for Muhammad.	30
94	Ash-Sharh	ٱلشَّرْح aš-Šarḥ	The Expansion of Breast, Solace, Consolation, Relief, Patient, The Opening-Up of the Heart	8 (1/3)	Makkah	12	12		v. 1		30
95	At-Tin	ٱلتِّين at-Tīn	The Fig Tree, The Fig	8 (1/3)	Makkah	28	20		v. 1	A fundamental moral verity, common to all true religious teachings.	30
96	Al-'Alaq	ٱلْعَلَق al-ʿAlaq̈	The Clinging Clot, Clot of Blood, The Germ-Cell, Thick Blood	19 (1/2)	Makkah	1	1		v. 2	The first five verses revealed to Muhammad. (v. 1–5)	30
97	Al-Qadr	ٱلْقَدْر al-Q̈adr	The Night of Honor, The Night of Decree, Power, Fate, Destiny, The Night of Power	5 (1/3)	Makkah	25	14		v. 1	The Night of Laylat-ul-Qadr	30
98	Al-Bayyina (Ahl al-Kitab)	ٱلْبَيِّنَة al-Bayyinahأَهْلُ الْكِتَاب ʾAhlu al-Kitāb	The Clear Evidence, The Evidence of the Truth, The Clear Proof The People of the Book	8 (1)	Madinah	100	92		v. 1	The Evidence, and the clear truth	30
99	Az-Zalzala	ٱلزَّلْزَلَة; Az-Zalzalah	The Earthquake	8 (1/3)	Madinah	93	25		v. 1		30
100	Al-'Adiyat	ٱلْعَادِيَات al-ʿĀdiyāt	The Coursers, The Chargers, The War Horse	11 (1/3)	Makkah	14	30		v. 1		30
101	Al-Qari'a	ٱلْقَارِعَة al-Q̈āriʿah	The Striking Hour, The Great Calamity, The Stunning Blow, The Sudden Calamity	11 (1/3)	Makkah	30	24		v. 1		30
102	At-Takathur	ٱلتَّكَاثُر at-Takāthur	The Piling Up, Rivalry in World Increase, Competition, Greed for More and More	8 (1/3)	Makkah	16	8		v. 1	Man's greed and tendencies.	30
103	Al-'Asr	ٱلْعَصْر al-ʿAṣr	The Time, The Declining Day, The Epoch, The Flight of Time, Success Criteria	3 (1/3)	Makkah	13	21		v. 1		30
104	Al-Humaza	ٱلْهُمَزَة al-Humazah	The Scandalmonger, The Traducer, The Gossipmonger, The Slanderer	9 (1/3)	Makkah	32	6		v. 1		30
105	Al-Fil	ٱلْفِيل al-Fīl	The Elephant	5 (1/3)	Makkah	19	9		v. 1	The Aksumite attack against Mecca in the year 570 CE, the Year of the Elephant.	30
106	Quraysh	قُرَيْش; Q̈urayš	The Quraysh	4 (1/3)	Makkah	29	4		v. 1	The Quraysh, custodians of the Kaaba, should be thankful to God for protecting them from hunger and danger.	30
107	Al-Ma'un (Ad-Din)	ٱلْمَاعُون al-Maʿūnٱلدِّين ad-Dīn	The Neighbourly Assistance, Small Kindnesses, Almsgiving, Assistance, The Recompense	7 (1/3)	Makkah	17	7		v. 7	The meaning of true worship through sincere devotion and helping those in need.; The first three verses from Mecca; the rest from Medina	30
108	Al-Kawthar	ٱلْكَوْثَر al-Kawthar	Abundance, Plenty, Good in Abundance	3 (1/3)	Makkah	15	5		v. 1	Spiritual riches through devotion and sacrifice.; Hatred results in the cutting off of all hope.	30
109	Al-Kafirun (Al-'Ibada)	ٱلْكَافِرُون al-Kāfirūnٱلْعِبَادَة al-ʿIbādah	The Disbelievers, The Kafirs, The Worship, The Adoration	6 (1/3)	Makkah	18	45		v. 1	The correct attitude towards those who reject faith.	30
110	An-Nasr (At-Tawdi')	ٱلنَّصْر an-Naṣrٱلتَّوْدِيع at-Tawdīʿ	The Help, The Divine Support, The Farewell	3 (1/3)	Madinah	114	111		v. 1	The last complete surah revealed before Muhammad's death.	30
111	Al-Masad (Tabbat)	ٱلْمَسَد al-Masadتَبَّت; Tabbat	The Plaited Rope, The Palm Fibre, The Twisted Strands, Ruined	5 (1/3)	Makkah	6	3		v. 5	Allah cursing Abu Lahab and his wife, who was Muhammad's uncle and at the time of the revelation of this verse, Muhammad's brother in law, due to his hostility towards Islam and Muhammad.	30
112	Al-Ikhlas (At-Tawhid)	ٱلْإِخْلَاص al-ʾIkhlāṣٱلتَّوْحِيد at-Tawḥīd	The Purity of Faith, The Fidelity, The Oneness and Unification of God, The Unity	4 (1/3)	Makkah	22	44		Whole Surah	The oneness of God.	30
113	Al-Falaq	ٱلْفَلَق al-Falaq̈	The Daybreak, Dawn, The Rising Dawn	5 (1/3)	Makkah	20	46		v. 1	Seek refuge in God from evil of others.	30
114	Al-Nas	ٱلنَّاس an-Nās	Mankind, Men, Mass	6 (1/3)	Makkah	21	47		Whole Surah	Trust in God's protection from temptations.	30

== See also ==
- Makkan surah
- Medinan surah

== Citations ==
Read Full Quran and Its Surah Yaseen Read Surah Yaseen Surah Yasin Surah Yaseen Reading Surah Yaseen
