= Theodor Nöldeke =

German orientalist and scholar (1836–1930)

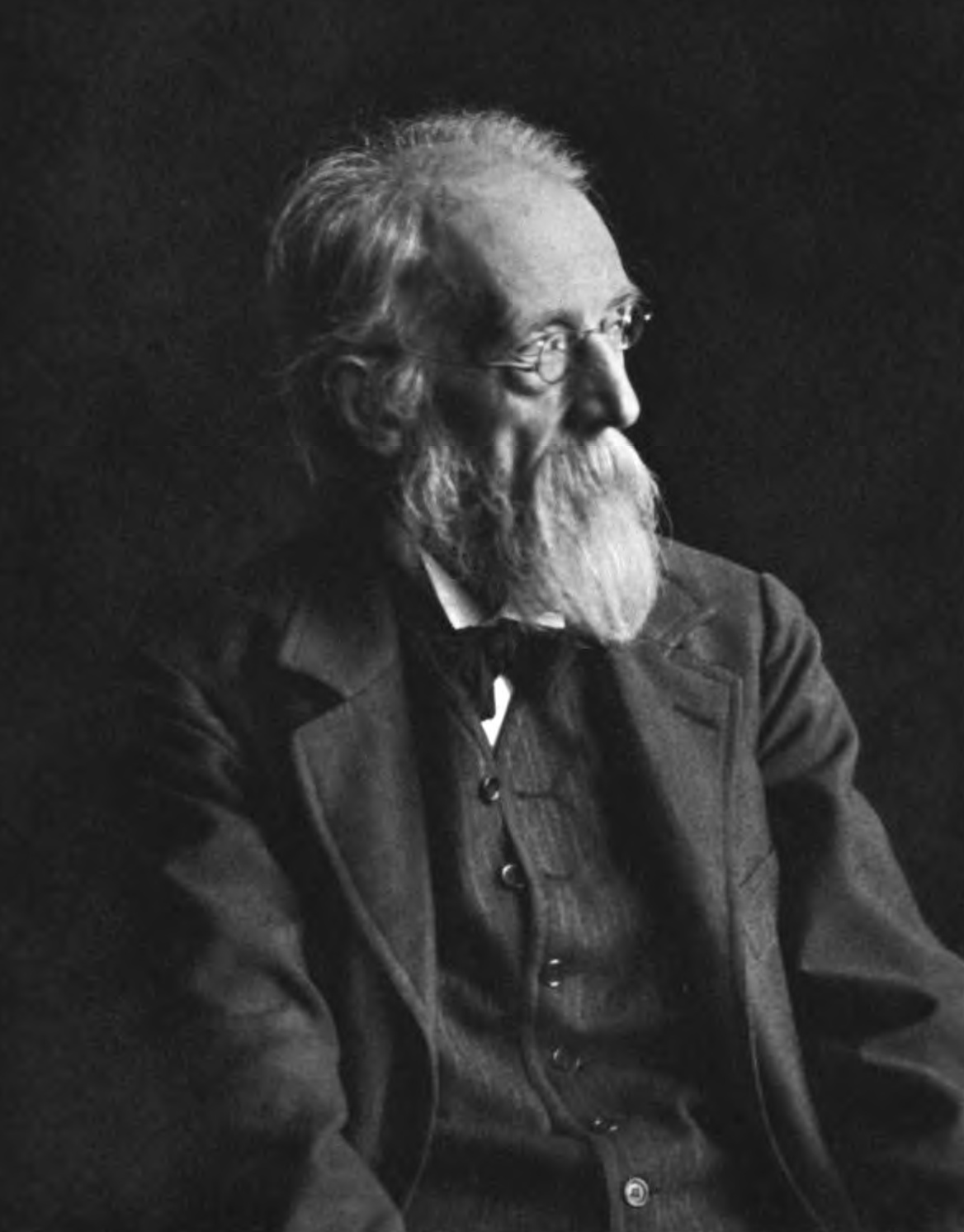
- Nöldeke, before 1907
- Born: 2 March 1836; Harburg, Kingdom of Hanover
- Died: 25 December 1930 (aged 94); Karlsruhe, Baden-Württemberg, Weimar Germany
- Occupation: Orientalist
- Writing career
- Notable works: Geschichte des Qorāns; Das Leben Mohammeds

Nöldeke's handwriting on a postcard, 1905

Theodor Nöldeke (German: [ˈteːodoːɐ̯ ˈnœldəkə]; born 2 March 1836 – 25 December 1930) was a German orientalist and scholar, originally a student of Heinrich Ewald. He is one of the founders of the field of Quranic studies, especially through his foundational work titled Geschichte des Qorāns (History of the Quran). His research interests also ranged over Old Testament studies, and his command of Semitic languages ranging across Arabic, Hebrew, Aramaic, Syriac, and Ethiopic allowed him to write hundreds of studies across a wide range of Oriental topics, including a number of translations, grammars, and works on literatures found in various languages.

Among the projects Nöldeke collaborated on was Michael Jan de Goeje’s published edition of al-Tabari's Tarikh ("Universal History"), for which he translated the Sassanid-era section. This translation remains of great value, particularly for the extensive supplementary commentary. His numerous students included Charles Cutler Torrey, Louis Ginzberg and Friedrich Zacharias Schwally. He entrusted Schwally with the continuation of Geschichte des Qorāns.

== Biography ==
Nöldeke was born on 2 March 1836 in Harburg, today a borough of Hamburg. In 1853 he graduated from the Gymnasium Georgianum Lingen, Emsland, and went on to study at the University of Göttingen under Heinrich Ewald, and later at the University of Vienna, the University of Leiden and the Humboldt University of Berlin.

In 1864 he became a professor at the University of Kiel and from 1872 at the University of Strasbourg until he retired aged 70. Many of his students became prominent researchers in their own right, including Eduard Sachau, Carl Brockelmann, Christiaan Snouck-Hurgronje, Edward Denison Ross, and Charles Cutler Torrey.

Nöldeke had ten children, six of whom predeceased him. His son Arnold Nöldeke became a judge and was a Hamburg senator during the Weimar period.

He died in Karlsruhe in 1930.

== Research ==
=== Geschichte des Qorâns ===
Noldeke's Geschichte emerged out of the dissertation that he had begun writing during his university studies, which was completed in 1856 and titled De origine et compositione surarum qoranicarum ipsiusque Qorani. Compared to earlier works studying the Quran by Western writers, Nöldeke uncoupled the study of the text from inquiries into the life of Muhammad and, unlike predecessors of his such as William Muir, did not have a missionary zeal. Instead, Nöldeke studied the Quran for its own sake. One of the most important aspects of Nöldeke's argument was his periodisation of the Quranic surahs into a tripartite Meccan phase followed by a Medinan phase (an idea already conceived by his predecessor, Gustav Weil). In this, Nöldeke, though he did not follow the traditional chronological division of surahs exactly, did follow it in some detail. At the same time, Nöldeke also considered his division to be malleable and tentative to a degree as opposed to absolute and deciding.

Although Nöldeke's work has been followed closely by some and rejected by others, it has been so influential that at least one scholar has referred to his work as "the rock of our church". In 2013, a complete translation of the volume into English was published.

=== Chronology of the Quran ===
The Nöldeke chronology is a "canonical ordering" of the 114 surahs of the Qur'an according to the sequence of revelation. Intended to aid theological, literary, and historical scholarship of Qur'anic exegesis by enhancing structural coherence. The Nöldeke Chronology has been adopted for general guidance by some schools of current scholarship. Nöldeke considered the surahs from the perspective of content and stylistic development and linguistic origination to rearrange them in historical sequence of revelation. According to his system Sura 21: “The Prophets,” – 21st of 114 surahs in the Qur'an – is renumbered '65'. His chronology further divided the surahs into two periods: The Meccan (in three phases), and the Medina.

The Nöldeke Chronology of the Qur'an: Four groups of the 114 Surahs:

- Group 1. First Meccan Period (48 Surahs): Surahs 96; 74; 111; 106; 108; 104; 107; 102; 105; 92; 90; 94; 93; 97; 86; 91; 80; 68; 87; 95; 103; 85; 73; 101; 99; 82; 81; 53; 84; 100; 79; 77; 78; 88; 89; 75; 83; 69; 51; 52; 56; 70; 55; 112; 109; 113; 114; 1
- Group 2. Second Meccan Period (21 Surahs): 54; 37; 71; 76; 44; 50; 20; 26; 15; 19; 38; 36; 43; 72; 67; 23; 21; 25; 17; 27; 18
- Group 3. Third Meccan Period (21 Surahs): 32; 41; 45; 16; 30; 11; 14; 12; 40; 28; 39; 29; 31; 42; 10; 34; 35; 7; 46; 6; 13
- Group 4. Medinan Period (24 Surahs): 2; 98; 64; 62; 8; 47; 3; 61; 57; 4; 65; 59; 33; 63; 24; 58; 22; 48; 66; 60; 110; 49; 9; 5

=== Mandaeism ===
In 1875, near the very beginning of the academic study of the religion of Mandaeism, Nöldeke published the Mandäische grammatik, a monumental work of Mandaean grammar that was of such philological depth that it remains the standard work on the subject to this day. It was also the basis of the subsequent Mandaic Dictionary by E. S. Drower.

=== Alexander the Great ===
In 1890, Nöldeke initiated the study of Alexander legends in the Arabic tradition with the publication of his Beiträge zur geschichte des Alexanderromans.

== Distinctions ==
- 1859 – won the French Académie des Inscriptions et Belles-Lettres prize for his Histoire du Coran and Semitic languages, and the history and civilization of Islam.
- 1860 – Geschichte des Qorâns German edition published with additions at Göttingen.
- 1861 – lectures at the university of Göttingen.
- 1864 – extraordinary professor at the university of Göttingen.
- 1868 – ordinary professor at Kiel; Grammatik der neusyrischen Sprache published.
- 1872 – chair of Oriental Languages at Strassburg, (resigns in 1906).
- 1874 – Mandäische Grammatik published.
- 1878 – Foreign member of the Royal Netherlands Academy of Arts and Sciences
- 1879 – external member of the Bavarian Academy of Sciences.
- 1881–1882 – translates Tabari (Arabic – German).
- 1888 – member of the Order Pour le Mérite for Sciences and Arts.
- 1892 – awarded an honorary doctorate by the University of Edinburgh.
- 1893 – appointed external member of the Accademia Nazionale dei Lincei in Rome.
- 1906 – International Member of the American Philosophical Society
- 1920 – associate member of the Heidelberg Academy of Sciences.
- 1926 – awarded honorary membership of the Russian Academy of Sciences –he had been a corresponding member since 1885; Honorary citizen of the city of Harburg (now part of Hamburg).

== Selected works ==
- Encyclopædia Britannica, several early essays and articles on the Qur'an, with others, republished in the journal Oriental Sketches.
- Geschichte des Qorâns (1860; Leipzig, Dieterich, 2nd rev. ed., 1909–38, pt. 1, pt.2; English translation by Wolfgang H. Behn: The History of the Qurʾān, Leiden: Brill 2013)
- Das Leben Mohammeds ("Life of Muḥammad", German text; Hanover, Rümpler, 1863)
- Beiträge zur Kenntnis der Poesie der alten Araber. (Hanover, Carl Rümpler, 1864)
- Die alttestamentliche Literatur (1868)
- Untersuchungen zur Kritik des Alten Testaments (1869)
- Nöldeke, Theodor (1871). "Ασσύριος Σύριος Σύρος". Hermes. 5 (3): 443–468. JSTOR 4471183.
- Nöldeke, Theodor (1871). "Die Namen der aramäischen Nation und Sprache". Zeitschrift der Deutschen Morgenländischen Gesellschaft. 25 (1–2): 113–131. JSTOR 43366019.
- Histoire Littéraire de L'ancien Testament; French (Paris, Sandoz et Fischbacher, 1873)
- Geschichte der Perser und Araber zur Zeit der Sasaniden. Aus der arabischen Chronik des Tabari übersetzt (1879)
- Nöldeke, Theodor (1880). Kurzgefasste syrische Grammatik (1st German ed.). Leipzig: Weigel.
  - Nöldeke, Theodor (1898) [1880]. Kurzgefasste syrische Grammatik (2nd German ed.). Leipzig: Tauchnitz.
    - Nöldeke, Theodor (1904). Compendious Syriac Grammar (1st English ed.). London: Williams & Norgate.
- Nöldeke, Theodor (1883). "Untersuchungen zur semitischen Grammatik". Zeitschrift der Deutschen Morgenländischen Gesellschaft. 37 (4): 525–540. JSTOR 43361632.
- Nöldeke, Theodor (1886). "Semitic Languages". The Encyclopaedia Britannica. Vol. 21 (9th ed.). New York: Charles Scribner's Sons. pp. 641–656.
- Review of Julius Wellhausen's Reste Arabischen Heidentums (1887) in ZDMG, Vol. 41 (1887), pp. 707–26.
- Aufsätze zur persischen Geschichte (Leipzig, 1887); articles on Persia.
- Beiträge zur geschichte des Alexanderromans (1890)
- Sketches from Eastern History (London & Edinburgh, Adam And Charles Black, 1892)
- A Servile War in the East [The Zanj Slave Uprising in 9th Century Mesopotamia] (English transl., John Sutherland Black; appeared as Chap. 5 in Sketches from Eastern History; 1892)
- Nöldeke, Theodor (1893). "Bemerkungen zu den aramäischen Inschriften von Sendschirli". Zeitschrift der Deutschen Morgenländischen Gesellschaft. 47 (1): 96–105. JSTOR 43362292.
- Das Iranische Nationalepos (Strassburg: Trübner, 1896).
- Zur Grammatik des klassischen Arabisch (1896)
- Fünf Mo'allaqat, übersetzt und erklärt (1899–1901)
- Articles in the Encyclopaedia Biblica (1903)
- Beiträge zur semitischen Sprachwissenschaft (1904)
- Kalila wa Dimna (Strassburg, Trübner, 1912)
- Israel und die Völker nach jüdischer Lehre co-authored by August Wünsche; ed., Joseph S Bloch; (Berlin, Wien, 1922)

He contributed frequently to the Zeitschrift der Deutschen Morgenländischen Gesellschaft, the Göttingische gelehrte Anzeigen and the Expositor.
