= Mu'mina =

Muʾmin (Arabic: مؤمن) is an Arabic Islamic term, frequently referenced in the Quran, that literally means "believer", and denotes a person who has complete submission to the Will of Allah and has faith firmly established in his heart, i.e. a "faithful Muslim". The term(Mu'mina) مومينه is used to identify a female that has a higher degree of faith in Islam.

== In the Quran ==
The Quran states:

:(An-Nisa 4:136) O you who believe! Believe in Allah, and His Messenger (Muhammad), and the Book (the Quran) which He has sent down to His Messenger, and the Scripture which He sent down to those before (him), and whosoever disbelieves in Allah, His Angels, His Books, His Messengers, and the Last Day, then indeed he has strayed far away.

This verse addresses the believers, exhorting them to believe, implying multiple stages of belief.

== Difference between Muslim and Mu'min / Mu'mina ==
In Islamic theology, there exists a significant difference between a Muslim and a Mu'min. A Muslim is a person who has come under the arena of Islam and believes its doctrines. A Mumin is a Muslim with higher degree of belief, with his/her heart having the fear of God and always abiding by the teachings of Quran. Thus, every Mumin is a Muslim but not every Muslim is a Mu'min.

The following verse makes a distinction between a Muslim and a believer:

(Al-Hujurat 49:14) The Arabs of the desert say, "We believe." (tu/minoo) Say thou: Ye believe not; but rather say, "We profess Islam;" (aslamna) for the faith (al-imanu) hath not yet found its way into your hearts. But if ye obey God and His Apostle, He will not allow you to lose any of your actions, for God is Forgiving, Merciful.

== See also ==
- Kafir
- Al-Mu’minoon
- Muhammad's wives
- Amir al-Mu'minin
