= Q70 =

Q70 may refer to:

- Q70 (New York City bus), a bus route in New York City
- Al-Maarij, the 70th surah of the Quran
- French submarine Foucault (Q70)
- Infiniti Q70, a sport sedan
- Samsung Sens Q70, a notebook computer
