= Al-Haqqa =

69th chapter of the Qur'an

Surah 69 of the Quran
الحاقة Al-Ḥāqqah The Reality
- Qira'ah; English text
- Classification: Meccan
- Other names: The Inevitable Hour, Truth
- Position: Juzʼ 29
- No. of verses: 52
- No. of Rukus: 2
- No. of words: 260
- No. of letters: 1,133

Al-Ḥāqqah (Arabic: الحاقة) is the 69th chapter (sūrah) of the Qur'an with 52 verses (āyāt). There are several English names under which the surah is known. These include “The Inevitable Hour”, “The Indubitable”, “The Inevitable Truth”, and “The Reality”. These titles are derived from alternate translations of al-Ḥāqqa, the word that appears in the first three ayat of the sura, each alluding to the main theme of the sura – the Day of Judgment.

Al-Ḥāqqah is a Meccan sura, meaning it was revealed to Muhammad while he lived in Mecca rather than in Medina. Meccan suras divided into early, middle, and late periods. Theodor Nöldeke, in his chronology of suras, places the sura to be revealed in the early Meccan period.

The Surah tells about the destiny of Thamud, ʿĀd, Pharaoh, other toppled towns, the flood that came in the hour of Noah. It discusses the prize of the steadfast and the punishment of the disbelievers. In conclusion, it says that this message is not the verse of a poet or something made up by Muhammad himself, it is the revelation of the Lord of the universes.

== Summary ==
- 1-3 The judgment of God will infallibly come
- 4-10 ʿĀd, Thamud, and Pharaoh destroyed for rejecting their prophets
- 11-16 As the flood came, so shall the judgment certainly come
- 17 On the Judgment Day God's throne shall be borne by eight mighty angels
- 18-29 The good and bad shall receive their account-books and be judged according to their deeds
- 30-37 Infidels shall be bound with chains seventy cubits in length and be cast into hell-fire
- 38-52 With terrible oaths Muhammad asserts the truth of his prophetic claims

=== 1-3 The day of resurrection ===
The Haqqah! What is the Haqqah? And what will make you understand what the Haqqah is?

— Quran 69:1-3

The first passage of the surah contains three ayaat. These 3 ayaat portray the day of resurrection and the day of judgement and emphasize that The judgment of God will infallibly come. "Haaqqa", referring to the Quranic view of the end time and eschatology. "Haaqqa" has been translated to Reality, Inevitable Hour, laying-bare of the truth, etc. According to Ibn Kathir, a traditionalistic exegete, Al-Haaqqa is one of the names of the Day of Judgement, like Al-Qaria, At-Tammah, As-Sakhkhah and others.

Rhetorically Al-Haaqqa has 2 similarities with Al-Qaria(101). Firstly the opening of the surah resembles Al-Qaria (101) which opens with the wordings
69:1 الْحَاقَّةُ
69:2 مَا الْحَاقَّةُ
69:3 وَمَا أَدْرَاكَ مَا الْحَاقَّةُ

Notice that Al-Qaria opens in exactly same style
101:1 الْقَارِعَةُ
101:2 مَا الْقَارِعَةُ
101:3 وَمَا أَدْرَاكَ مَا الْقَارِعَةُ

Secondly, the word Al-Qaria appears as a total of five times in the Quran, of which three occasions are in Al-Qaria(101) while once it appears in Al-Haaqqa as well.

=== 4-8 Thamud and ʿĀd, ancient tribes ===
(4)Thamud and ʿĀd denied the Striking Disaster. (5)As for Thamud, they were destroyed by an overwhelming blast. (6)And as for ʿĀd, they were destroyed by a furious, bitter wind. (7) which Allah unleashed on them non-stop for seven nights and eight days, so that you would have seen its people lying dead like trunks of uprooted palm trees. (8)Do you see any of them left alive?

— Quran 69:4-8

The 2nd passage of the surah contains 4 ayaat. These ayaat exemplify the history of ancient tribes Thamud and ʿĀd. Particulars of the pre-Islamic tribes of 'Ad and Thamud have been discussed in Quran elsewhere as well. Mention of ʿĀd occurs 24 times in total while the people of Thamud are mentioned 26 times in the whole Quran. Both of these tribes rejected the Prophets so they were destroyed by the wrath of ALLAH. The surah not only remind the history lesson but also re-narrate the specifics of how the final destruction was struck upon these aforementioned nations. Thus the tone of this surah displays the anger towards the attitude of disbelievers and the discourse makes it more and more clear as we move forward along the text. In the eighth ayat, the Quran asks a direct emphatic question from the audience of the Quran, "Do you see any of them left alive?"

=== 9-12 Pharaoh's crime ===
(9)And the same crime was committed by Pharaoh and those before him and by the settlements that were overturned. (10)Such that they disobeyed the messenger of their Lord. So He gripped them with a grip ever-intensifying. (11)Indeed, when the floodwater had overflowed, We carried you in the floating Ark, (12)So that We may make this a reminder to you, and that attentive ears may grasp it.

— Quran 69:9-12

These 4 ayaat carry the continued tonality of warning by reminding examples and thus mention Pharaoh's crime. According to Tafsirs, the subverted cities mentioned in the 9th ayat refer to Sodom and Gomorrah i.e. the people of the prophet Lut. The text of the ayaat 11th and 12th are loaded with references, so their literal word to word translation needs adequate annotation. Rephrasing and aiding the original text with commentary illustrate the meanings as follows: "Similarly, as a consequence of denying Noah" when the flood rose high, it was We (ALMIGHTY) who carried you (your ancestors) (Note: Metonymically in the consensus of all classical commentators) upon the ark. To make this "account" a reminder for you and that retaining ears may hear and retain it. Alluding to the punishment of evildoers and the saving grace bestowed upon the righteous. Sale sums this up: "As the flood came, so shall the judgment certainly come".

=== 13-18 one of the names of Qiyamah ===
(13)And when the trumpet shall sound one blast; (14)And the earth with the mountains shall be lifted up and crushed with one crash, (15)Then, on that day will the Event befall. (16)The sky will then be so torn that it will be frail, (17)And the angels will be on the sides thereof, and eight will uphold the Throne of their Lord that day, above them. (18)On that day ye will be exposed; not a secret of you will be hidden.

— Quran 69:13-18

The discourse of the surah now returns to the topic of its opening verse. The first three verses announced one of the names of Qiyamah, asked what it is, and how would you know about it.

Next 9 ayaat then reminded of (at least) 5 ancient nations, their negligence towards their Messengers, and consequently their punishment. Notice that all of these were worldly punishments; before the Last Judgment. Now the imagery of Qiyamah and Afterlife is depicted in ayaat 13th to 37th. Ayaat 13th to 17th features the affects of Trumpet of Israfil i.e.; its single blow sound will cause cosmic chaos and catastrophe. A picturesque depiction of mountains and earth lifted from their original space and then being smashed and destroyed, and sky being torn apart is portrayed. The polytheists are informed that the angels whom they view as divinities and expect that they will mediate for them before God will themselves be in a condition of uneasiness when the incredible disturbance happens and will pull back to the fringe of the sky. According to the text of the surah, people will be able to see 8 Angels; Bearers of the Throne carrying the throne of Allah. And then Quran asserts that all of the deeds of a person will be exposed no matter how secretly he did them.

=== 19-37 Reward and punishment ===
(19)Then he, who will be given his Book of Deeds in his right hand, will say: "Here it is, read my Book of deeds!" (20)I knew that I would certainly face my reckoning." (21)So he will have a life of pleasure, (22)in a lofty garden, (23)with clusters of fruit within his reach. (24)We shall say to him: "Eat and drink to your heart's content; this is a reward for what you did in the days gone by." (25)While he, who will be given his Book of Deeds in his left hand, will say: "Woe to me, would that I had not been given my Book of Deeds (26)nor known what my account was! (27)Would that my death had ended all! (28)My wealth had availed me nothing, (29)and my authority has gone away from me." (30)We shall say: "Seize him and put a chain around his neck, (31)then cast him in the blazing fire, (32)then fasten him with a chain seventy cubits long. (33)For he did not believe in Allah, the Most High, (34)nor did he care to feed the poor. (35)Today he neither has a true friend here, (36)nor any food except the pus from the washing of wounds, (37)which none but the wrongdoers eat."

— Quran 69:19-37

This passage explains the fortunate people and their reward, and unfortunate people and their punishment. The good and bad shall receive their account-books and be judged according to their deeds. The linguistic symbolism of "right" and "left" as "righteous" and "unrighteous" is explained here. In 19th ayat "haa" is a particle of interjection, or added demonstrative particle-like in haa-huna or haa-antum. Which means that it shows the expression and exclamation of joy, like English counterpart "yeah". The righteous person will be overjoyed when he gets his record in his right hand and will show it to his companions. This is also mentioned in surah Al-Inshiqaq "He will return to his kinsfolk rejoicing". Adding to the exclamation of joy, he will be explaining that he was lucky because he had been conscious of the Hereafter in worldly life and had carried on with his existence with the conviction that he would need to show up before God one day and render his record to Him. This ideology of a righteous person is evident elsewhere in Quran as well; i.e. "(They are those) who are certain that they are going to meet their Lord". Implying that he had always been conscious of resurrection and judgment, and had tried to behave accordingly. Then the fruits of Paradise are mentioned as rewards of the righteous that orchards will be at a height and lofty, yet their fruits and bunches will bend low in easy reach for those who want to consume them. The first and foremost exegesis/tafsir of the Qur'an is found in hadith of Muhammad. Ḥadīth (حديث) is literally "speech" or "report", that is a recorded saying or tradition of Muhammad validated by isnad; with Sirah Rasul Allah these comprise the sunnah and reveal shariah. According to Aishah, the life of Prophet Muhammad was practical implementation of Qur'an. This topic of receiving the record on the day of judgment is mentioned in the Hadith as follows:

- Safwan bin Muhriz Al-Mazini narrated that: "We were with Abdullah ibn Umar when he was circumambulating the Kaaba; a man came up to him and said: 'O Ibn 'Umar, what did you hear the Messenger of Allah say about the Najwa?' He said: 'I heard the Messenger of Allah say: 'On the Day of Resurrection, the believer will be brought close to his Lord until He will cover him with His screen, then He will make him confess his sins. He will ask him: "Do you confess?" He will say: "O Lord, I confess." This will continue as long as Allah wills, then He will say: "I concealed them for you in the world, and I forgive you for them today." Then he will be given the scroll of his good deeds, or his record, in his right hand. But as for the disbeliever or the hypocrite, (his sins) will be announced before the witnesses.' " (Note: (One of the narrators) Khalid said: "At: 'before the witnesses' there is something missing." (These are the ones who lied against their Lord!' No doubt! The curse of Allah is on the wrongdoers.))

In contrast to the dwellers of paradise, now the text of the Surah discusses the fate of wrongdoers is a very graphic detail. He will be given his book in the left hand, he will be expressing his dejectedness by a deathwish of death which precedes with no accountability, he would express his feelings openly of not being aware of his account and accountability. He would complain that his worldly wealth and authority is of no use now. Handing over the record in the left hand and his displayed lamentation will then be followed by the punishment of getting shackled in a chain whose length has been mentioned to be detrimental. And his sins are declared in 34th and 35th ayaat that he did not believe in ALLAH and did not encourage to feed the poor despite the fact he confessed to being a wealthy person in the previous ayat. Then the picturization of his punishment continues that neither he would have any company nor any food. The only food available for such people would be the pus of their own wounds.

The actual word is غِسۡلِیۡن. In the Arabic language, it is used for the fluid in which dirty and impure things are washed. It is evident from this that the very wealth of his that he had made filthy by not spending it for the cause of God will come before him on the Day of Judgement in the form of this fluid. Because of the similarity between a deed and its consequence, this food will specifically be reserved for such sinners.—Ghamidi

=== 38-52 Ruku ===
(38)So, no! I present before you the testimony of that which you see, (39) as well as all that you cannot see! (40) Behold, this [Qur'an] is indeed the [inspired] word of a noble apostle, (41) It is not the word of a poet: little it is that you believe; (42) Nor is it the word of a soothsayer: little it is that you reflect: (43) [it is] a revelation from the Sustainer of all the worlds. (44) Now if he [whom We have entrusted with it] had dared to attribute some [of his own] sayings unto Us, (45) We would indeed have seized him by his right hand, (46) and would indeed have cut his life-vein, (47) and none of you could have saved him! (48) And, verily, this [Qur'an] is a reminder to all the God-conscious. (49) And We know that there are some among you who deny it: (50) For such disbelievers it is indeed a cause of despair - (51) for, verily, it is truth absolute! (52) So, [O Prophet !] keep glorifying the name of your Lord, Most High.

— Quran 69:38-52

The surahs of the Quran which consist of a discourse covering more than a single topic contains thematic markers called Ruku. This surah consist of 2 rukus. The 2nd one consist of ayaat from 38th up to the end of the surah and the pericope talks about the prophet Muhammad.

The disbelievers of Mecca are addressed and told: "You think this Qur'an is the word of a poet or soothsayer, whereas it is a Revelation sent down by Allah, which is being presented by His noble Rasool. The Rasool by himself has no power to add or delete a word in it. If he forges something of his own composition into it, We will cut off his jugular vein. - Abul A'la Maududi"

== Hadith about Al-Haaqqa ==
- Muhammed used to recite 2 equal surahs in one Rakat; (Note: Alqamah ibn Waqqas and Al-Aswad ibn Yazid said: A man came to Ibn Mas'ud. He said: I recite the mufassal surahs in one rak'ah. You might recite it quickly as one recites verse (poetry) quickly, or as the dried dates fall down (from the tree). But the Prophet (pbuh) used to recite this way...) he would recite (for instance) surahs an-Najm (53) and ar-Rahman (55) in one rak'ah, surahs Al-Qamar (54) and Al-Haaqqa (69) in one rak'ah, surahs at-Tur (52) and adh-Dhariyat (51) in one rak'ah, surahs Al-Waqi'a (56) and Nun (68) in one rak'ah, surahs Al-Maarij (70) and An-Naziat (79) in one rak'ah, surahs al-Mutaffifin (83) and Abasa (80) in one rak'ah, surahs Al-Muddaththir (74) and al-Muzzammil (73) in one rak'ah, surahs al-Insan (76) and Al-Qiyama (75) in one rak'ah, surahs an-Naba' (78) and Al-Mursalat (77) in one rak'ah, and surahs ad-Dukhan (44) and at-Takwir (81) in one rak'ah. (Note: Narrated Ibn Mas'ud: Abu Dawood said: This is the arrangement of Ibn Mas'ud himself.)
- Ubayy ibn Ka'b narrates from the Prophet, "Whoever recites Surah Al-Haqqah, Allah will make his reckoning easy."
- Jabir al-Ju'fi also narrated from Muhammad al-Baqir, "Recite Surah al-Haqqah frequently in your obligatory and recommended prayers, because reciting it in prayer is a sign of faith in God and His Prophet, and whoever recites it will not be deprived of his religion until the moment he meets God."
