= Al-Muʼminun =

23rd chapter of the Qur'an

Surah 23 of the Quran
المؤمنون Al-Mu’minūn The Believers
- Qira'ah; English text
- Classification: Meccan
- Position: Juzʼ 18
- Hizb no.: 35
- No. of verses: 118
- No. of Rukus: 6
- No. of words: 1162
- No. of letters: 4401

Al-Muʼminun (Arabic: المؤمنون, al-muʼminūn; meaning: "The Believers") is the 23rd chapter (sūrah) of the Qur'an with 118 verses (āyāt). Regarding the timing and contextual background of the revelation (asbāb al-nuzūl), it is a "Meccan surah" during the end period, which means it is believed to have been revealed before the migration of the Islamic prophet Muhammad and his followers from Mecca to Medina (Hijra).

This surah deals with the fundamentals of faith (Aqidah), Tawheed (Islamic monotheism), Risalah (Messengership), Resurrection and the supreme Judgement of God. The surah drives these themes home by drawing attention to God's creation of man through different stages in the mother's womb, His creation of the heavens and the earth, His sending down rains and growing plants, trees and fruits, and His providing of domestic animals with various benefits for man, all together with an emphasis on the fact that man shall die and shall be raised up on the Day of Resurrection. (See also: Islamic eschatology)

The theme of Risalah is emphasized with reference to the accounts of some prophets of Islam such as Nuh (Noah), Hud, Musa (Moses) and Isa (Jesus), noting that all of them delivered the same message of monotheism, but were disbelieved and opposed by the people they preached to, and that all of them were helped and rescued by Allah. A reference is also made to the similar unbelief and opposition of the Meccan leaders to the message delivered to them by Muhammad. The Surah ends with another reference to the inevitability of the Day of Resurrection and pointing out that man will not have a second chance to return to the worldly life and make amends for his lapses and mistakes.

== Summary ==
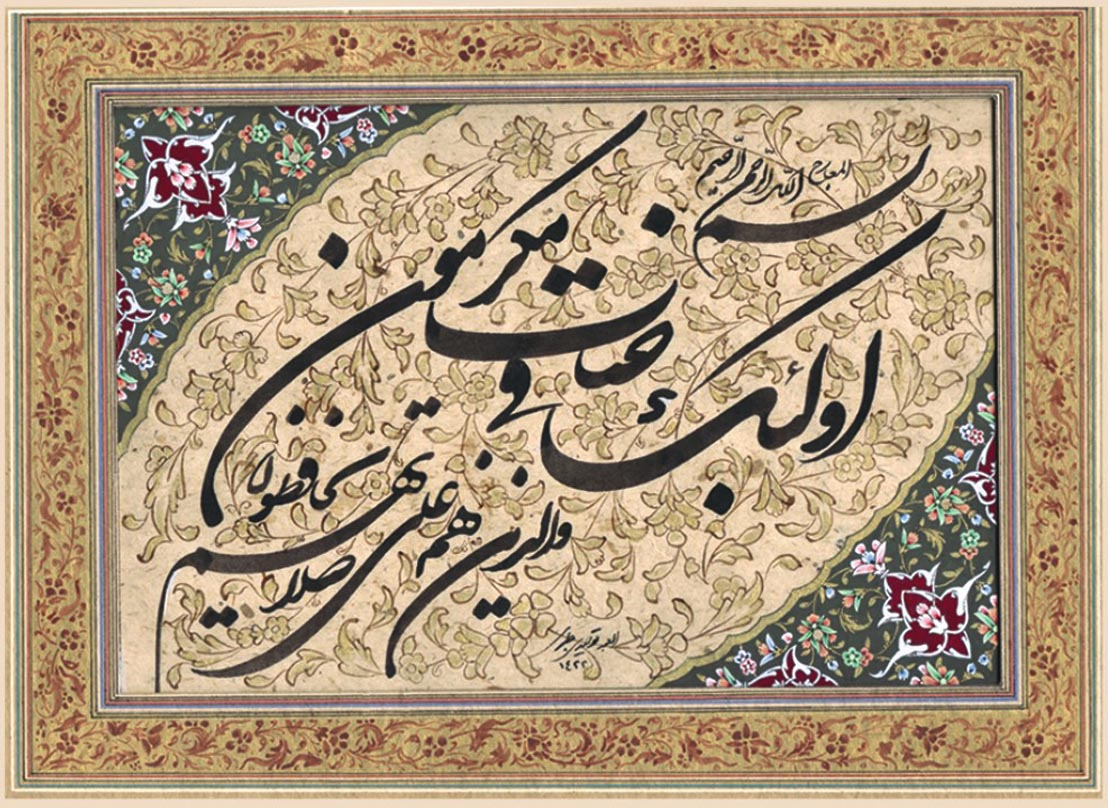
Two verses of Al-Mu'minoon in Nastaʿlīq script.

- 1-9 True believers described
- 10-11 Their reward hereafter
- 12-14 God the creator of mankind
- 15, 16 The dead shall be raised by him
- 17 God created the seven heavens
- 18-23 God the author of all our blessings
- 24 Noah, sent as an apostle of God, preaches against idolatry
- 25-27 The people reject Noah as a madman
- 28-32 Noah is commanded to make the ark, to save himself and true followers from the Flood
- 33-46 Hud is sent to the Aad tribe after Noah, they reject him and are destroyed.
- 47-50 Moses and Aaron are rejected as impostors
- 50-51 The unbelievers are destroyed, but God gives a book to Moses for the direction of believers
- 52 Jesus and Mary created a sign
- 53-54 Apostles exhorted to be steadfast in the true faith
- 55-58 The sectarians to be left in their confusion
- 59-62 True believers sure of their reward
- 63 God judges men according to their ability
- 64-65 The idolatrous Quraysh will not believe the Quran
- 66-68 Idolaters will cry unto God in vain when in distress
- 69-72 The Quraish reject their Prophet as a madman
- 73-75 A gracious invitation rejected by them
- 76 God continues the calamity of the Makkans in mercy to them
- 77-78 The chastisements of the Lord rejected
- 79-81 God, the author of life and intellect, can raise the dead
- 82-84 The Quraish persist in denying the resurrection
- 85-91 They are judged out of their own mouths
- 92-93 Angels not the offspring of God
- 94-99 The Prophet takes refuge in God against every evil spirit
- 100-101 Repentance after death will be in vain
- 102-109 The awful doom of unbelievers
- 110-112 They are punished for persecuting believers
- 113-115 Time will pass slowly in hell
- 116-118 Triumph of the faithful over the unbelieving idolaters

The Surah begins with an assertion, "Most certainly the Believers have attained true success", intending to put across a point that the criterion of success and failure which people who disbelieve in Islam, hold in mind is in fact erred because it is based on misconceptions and is transitory and limited in nature, in turn leading to eventual failure and not true success.

On the contrary, those who follow the teachings of Islam taught by Muhammad, regarded by the disbelievers as failures are actually the ones who are truly successful. Because by their acceptance of the invitation to Islam, they are guaranteed of true success and everlasting bliss in this world as well as in the Hereafter. By rejecting the message of Islam, the non-believers have incurred a profound loss and would meet with the evil consequences both in this world and the next.

This is the main theme of the Surah and the whole discourse, from the beginning to the end, is meant to impress the same.

== Q23:1-11 Qualities of the believers ==
The first eleven verses mention the desired qualities of the believers, they are blessed and will attain victory:

A brief translation of the first 11 verses is as follows:

(1) The believers have indeed attained true success!
(2) Those who pray humbly,
(3) who shun idle talk,
(4) who pay the prescribed alms,
(5) who guard their chastity
(6) except with their spouses or their slaves ––with these they are not to blame,
(7) but anyone who seeks more than this is exceeding the limits––
(8) who are faithful to their trusts and pledges
(9) and who keep up their prayers,
(10) will rightly be given
(11) Paradise as their own, there to remain.

=== 2 Possess Al-Khushoo ===
The first quality as described in verse 2 of this Surah is, "Those who are humble in their prayers"; the Arabic word used to describe the people is 'Khashi'oon' meaning those of who possess 'Al-Khushoo'.

According to Tafsir ibn Kathir, a classical Tafsir (i.e. a commentary of the Quran written by Islamic scholar Ibn Kathir), the Arabic word 'Khushoo' encompasses the meanings of calmness, serenity, tranquility, dignity, and humility.", while Ibn Abbas explains 'Khashi'oon' to mean, with fear and tranquility. Al-Khushoo is a necessary component of Salaah, however can be very easily lost. In a hadith, Muhammad said "The first thing to be lifted up (taken away) from this Ummah will be al-Khushoo; until you will see n o one who has al-Khushoo."

To attain al-Khushoo one must forget everything about the world and concentrate in the prayer acts, reciting the Qur'an and thinking of the verses one reads and bearing death, grave and the torment in mind so that he never loses concentration. In his Tafseer, Ibn Kathir writes, "Khushoo is gained by the fear of Allah and the sense that He is always watching." In another section he says, "The site of al-Khushoo is in the heart and heart is the king of the limbs, so if one intends to pray wholeheartedly the limbs will follow the heart as Allah says (in the Qur'an): 'And seek help in patience and Salaat and truly it is extremely heavy and hard, except for Khashi'oon.' The meaning is that the burden of prayer is heavy indeed; except for those who have Khushoo."

Regarding the same verse, i.e. 'And seek help in patience and Salaat and truly it is extremely heavy and hard, except for Khashi'oon.', Ibn Taymiyyah is of the opinion that "This (verse) implies condemnation of those who are not Khashi'oon... Condemnation only applies when something obligatory is not done, or when something forbidden is done. If those who do not have Khushoo are to be condemned, this indicates that Khushoo is obligatory."

In his book titled Towards Understanding the Qur'an, Islamic thinker and philosopher Abul Ala Maududi cites a notion that "Al-Khushoo of the heart is to fear and stand in awe of a powerful person, and al-Khushoo of the body is to bow one's head and lower one's gaze and voice in his presence. In Salaah one is required to show al-Khushoo, both of the heart and of the body, and this is the essence of this Islamic Prayer. It has been reported that when Muhammad once saw a person offering Salaah, as well as playing with his beard, he remarked: "Had he khushu in his heart, his body would have manifested it."

Maududi then continues, "Though al-Khushoo is actually a condition of the heart, as stated by the above tradition, it is manifested by the body as a matter of course. The Shariah has enjoined certain etiquette which, on the one hand, helps produce al-Khushoo in the heart, and on the other, helps sustain the physical act of the Prayer in spite of the fluctuating condition of the heart. According to this etiquette, one should neither turn to the right or left, nor raise one's head to look up: one may, however, look around from the corner of the eye, but as far as possible, one must fix the gaze on the place where the forehead would rest in prostration; one is also forbidden to shift about, incline side ways, fold the garments or shake off dust from them. It is also forbidden that while going down for prostration, one should clean the place where one would sit or perform prostration. Similarly it is disrespectful that one should stand stuffy erect, recite the verses of the Qur'an in a loud resounding voice, or sing them, or belch or yawn repeatedly and noisily. It has also not been approved that one should offer the Prayer in a hurry. The injunction is that each article of the Prayer should be performed in perfect peace and tranquility, and unless one article has been completely performed, the next should not be begun. If one feels hurt by something during the Prayer, one may cast it aside by one hand, but moving the hand repeatedly or using both the hands for the purpose is prohibited. with this etiquette of the body, it is also important that one should irrelevant things during the Prayer. If thoughts come to the mind intention, it is a natural human weakness, but one should try one's best and try to ensure with one's utmost that the mind and heart are wholly turned towards Allah, and the mind is in full harmony and tune with the tongue, and as soon as one becomes conscious of irrelevant thoughts one should immediately turn the attention to the Prayer".

=== 3 Turn away from Al-Lagw ===
The next quality gathered from verse 3 is that the believers turn away from Al-Lagw. The Arabic word Al-Lagw, as explained by Ibn Kathir. in his Tafseer, refers to falsehood, which encompasses all acts of sin, including the greatest of them i.e. Shirk in Islam, and any words or deeds that are of no benefit. In a Sahih hadith from the al-Tirmidhi collection of aḥadīth, Muhammad is reported to have said: "Out of a person being a good Muslim is his leaving alone, what does not benefit him"; while in the Sahih al-Bukhari (the Sahih of Muhammad al-Bukhari) he is also reported to have said "Let he who truly believes in Allah and the Last Day speak good or be silent.".

In his Musnad Ahmed, Imam Ahmed has reported, "The faith of a man cannot be straight unless his heart is straight, and his heart cannot be straight, unless his tongue becomes straight." It was from the manners of the Sahabah to speak very little, while Abu Dharr al-Ghifari said: "Adopt silence, this is the way of causing Shaytan to run away; it is a supporter to you in the matter of your religion." Abd Allah ibn Mas'ud is reported to have said: "By the One other than whom there is no God on this earth there is no one more deserving of long imprisonment that the tongue."

In another place, Surah 2:83 mentions that the covenant taken by Musa (i.e. Moses) from Bani Israel had also included the condition that they should indulge in good and worthwhile conversation, while being kind to parents, kindred, orphans and those in need, practice regular charity and to worship God alone. While, Sura 104:1-19 condemns those who are scandal/gossip-mongers and backbiters in strong terms, describing their punishment as "Nay, but verily he will be flung to the Consuming One; And what will explain to thee what the Consuming One is! (It is) the Fire of (the Wrath of) Allah kindled (to a blaze), Which rises above the hearts. Surely it shall be closed over upon them, In outstretched columns.", thus hinting that believers need to steer clear of such acts.

=== 4 Pay the Zakat ===
Verse 4 says that the believers pay Zakat, i.e. poor-due that is paid on one's wealth. Commentators on the Qur'an, like Ibn Kathir are of the opinion that this verse could also be referring to the poor-due mentioned in Sura 6:141 which states "pay the due thereof on the day of their harvest.", as well as that it could be that what is meant here by Zakaat is purification of the soul from Shirk and filth, as in Sura 91:9-10 which says "Indeed he succeeds who purifies himself (Zakkaha). And indeed he fails who corrupts himself." The commentators are hence of the opinion that probably both meanings are intended, purification of the soul as well as purification of one's wealth, because that is also part of the purification of the soul, and the true believer is one who pays attention to both matters.

Surah 9:60 lists those who are eligible to receive Zakaat by saying "Alms are for the poor and the needy, and those employed to administer the (funds); for those whose hearts have been (recently) reconciled (to Truth); for those in bondage and in debt; in the cause of Allah; and for the wayfarer: (thus is it) ordained by Allah, and Allah is full of knowledge and wisdom", while Sura 17:26 commands the believers to "Render to the kindred their due rights, as (also) to those in want, and to the wayfarer: But squander not (your wealth) in the manner of a spendthrift. "

The believers are also advised to "listen and obey and spend in charity" for "the benefit of your own soul" and be from the ones who "achieve prosperity", as mentioned in Sura 64:16.

=== 5-7 Avoid Zina, i.e. guard their chastity ===
Verses 5 through to 7 of this Surah says "And who guard their modesty; Save from their wives or the (slaves) that their right hands possess, for then they are not blameworthy; But whoso craveth beyond that, such are transgressors". Zina (extramarital sex) is one of the major sins in Islam concerning which stern warnings have been issued in the Qur'an as well as authentic aḥadīth attributed to Muhammad. In Surah 17:32, God says "…come not near to Zina. Verily, it is Fahishah (immoral sin) and an evil way." The Qur'an also says that Homosexuality too is Haraam (sinful) and it is against the natural inclination which God has placed in man, whereby the male is inclined towards female and vice versa. In an authentic hadith from the Tirmidhi collection, Muhammad is reported to have said: "There is nothing I fear for my Ummah more than the deed of the people of Lot.".

Surah 27:54-58 refers to the punishment that befell the people of Lut: "And (remember) Lut when he said to his people, 'Do you commit al-Fahishah (evil, great sin, every kind of unlawful sexual intercourse, sodomy) while you see (one another doing evil without any screen) Do you practice your lusts on men instead of women? Nay, but you are a people who behave senselessly.' There was no other answer given by his people except that they said: 'Drive out the family of Loot from your city. Verily, these are men who want to be clean and pure!' So We saved him and his family, except his wife. We destined her to be of those who remained behind. And We rained down on them a rain (of stones). So evil was the rain of those who were warned." Muhammad has also thus said: "Whoever of you finds (someone) doing the deed of the people of Lot, kill the one who does it and the one to whom it is done."

Ibn Qayyim Al-Jawziyya is of the opinion that: "Both of them - fornication and homosexuality - involve immorality that goes against the wisdom of Allah's creation and commandment. For homosexuality involves innumerable evil and harms, and the one to whom it is done would be better off being killed than having this done to him, because after that he will become so evil and so corrupt that there can be no hope of his being reformed, and all good is lost for him, and he will no longer feel any shame before Allah or before His creation… The scholars differed as to whether the one to whom it is done will ever enter Paradise. There are two opinions which I heard Shaikh al-Islam (rahimahullah) narrate."

=== 8 Are faithful to their covenants ===
The next verse, i.e. Sura 23:8 stresses on the quality trust that the believers' are to possess describing them as "Those who faithfully observe their trusts and their covenants". A similar message is found in Sura 4:58 where the Qur'an ordains God's command as, "Verily, Allah commands that you should render back the trusts to those, to whom they are due…"

The believers in Islam are thus ordered fulfill the terms and conditions of the trusts which are placed in their charge. The Arabic word al-Amanah (or al-Amanat) includes all kinds of trusts which are placed in their charge including those placed by God as well as those placed by the society or individuals. Similarly, the Arabic term '`ahd' encompasses all compacts, pledges, and promises made between God and man, and amongst men themselves. Muhammad would always impress the importance of the fulfillment of pledges in his addresses to the people. On one occasion he is reported to have said "The one, who does not fulfill the terms of his trust, has no Faith, and the one, who does not keep promises and pledges has no Islam."".

Muhammad, in Sahih Muslim is also reported to have said "The rights will be rendered back to those to whom they are due, and even the sheep that does not have horns will take revenge from the horned sheep." And on another occasion he is reported to have said "Certainly, al-Amanah (the trust or moral responsibilities, etc. and all the duties which Allah has ordained) descended from the Heaven and settled in the roots of the hearts of the faithful believers, and then the Qur'an was revealed, and the people read the Qur'an (and learnt al-Amanah from it) and also learnt it from the Sunnah. (i.e. Both the Qur'an and As-Sunnah strengthen the faithful believers' 'Amanah')."

Regarding the verse 8 from Surah Al-Mu’minoon, Tafsir ibn Kathir says "When they (the Believers) are entrusted with something, they do not betray that trust, but they fulfill it, and when they make a promise or make a pledge, they are true to their word."

Four characteristics of a hypocrite

According to a tradition reported both by Sahih al-Bukhari and Sahih Muslim, Muhammad is reported to have said: "Four characteristics are such that if a person has all the four in him, he is beyond any doubt a hypocrite, and the one who has one of these, is a hypocrite to that extent till he gives it up:

- (a) When something is placed in his trust, he commits breach of the trust,
- (b) when he speaks, he tells a lie,
- (c) when he makes a promise, he breaks it, and,
- (d) when he has a quarrel with somebody, he exceeds all limits (of decency and morality)"

=== 9 Strictly guard their Salaat ===
In the next verse, i.e. verse 9, Allah mentions preserving of Salaah (the formal Islamic prayer) as one of the important characteristics of successful believers. Verse 2 implied the believers' humility during act of performing Salaah, while verse 9 refers to the individual prayers offered in their own times. Believers are described as those strictly adhering to the prescribed times, performing them with due regard to their pre-requisites, conditions and articles with clean body and dress, and necessary ablutions. Believers are required to not regard their prayers as an unnecessary burden, completing the task mechanically, but are to understand their recital while being conscious that they are supplicating like humble servants.

Prophet Muhammed is reported to have said "The first duty that Allah, the Supreme, has ordained upon my nation is that of offering Prayer, and indeed Prayer is the first thing that will be taken account of on the Day of Resurrection." as well as "Whoever keeps the Prayer established, has kept his religion established - and whoever leaves Prayer has demolished religion (i.e. left the fold of Islam)". While, the Qur'an makes it clear that the purpose for creation is to worship Allah alone, and that the most excellent way of praying is to offer Salaah standing before Allah in devout obedience. The Islamic Adhaan (call for prayer) which is recited at time of each prayer contains two verses (each recited twice) "Hayya’ala-Salaah" and "Hayya’ala-Falaah" which translate to "Come to Salaah" and "Come to success" respectively, indicating that by performing Salaah, one may attain eternal success.

In a Hadith reference, Abdullah ibn Mas'ud narrates "I asked Allah's Messenger, Prophet Muhammed: "O Messenger of Allah, which deed is most beloved to Allah?" He said: "Prayer at the appointed time." I said: "Then what?" He said: "Kindness to parents." I said: "Then what?" He said: "Jihad (struggle) in the way of Allah."". Prophet Muhammed is also reported to have likened the Salaah to five daily baths that cleanse a person's sins; Abu Huraira narrates that "I heard Allah's Apostle saying, "If there was a river at the door of anyone of you and he took a bath in it five times a day would you notice any dirt on him?" They said, "Not a trace of dirt would be left." The Prophet added, "That is the example of the five prayers with which Allah blots out (annuls) evil deeds."

The Qur'an has also pointed out that believers perform Salaah only to earn the pleasure of Allah and not to impress anyone else, calling anyone who does so a hypocrite. Moreover, those who abandon Salaah are warned of dire consequences, while only those who humbly submit themselves to Allah alone are said to have ease in offering it. In Surah Al-Ma'arij, Allah uses the word halu’an to describe the restless and impatient nature of man, stating that whenever he is afflicted with trouble he lacks patience and trembles in despair. This occurs due to shortcomings in his faith, whereas when he is given in abundance he becomes ungrateful towards Allah. He is also arrogant and uncaring towards those less fortunate than him. The Qur'an then assures the observance of Salaah as way to preserve hope in times of grievance and humbleness as well as humility in periods of bountiful life. Salaah thus has the power to erase the roots of evil deeds which bring barriers in the society giving birth to racial as well as financial discriminations and sinful intentions.

=== Good news of paradise for the believers ===
After mentioning the characteristics of the successful believer, God gives them the good news of Firdaus (Ajma' (عجماء)). Muhammad said: "If you ask Allah for Paradise, then ask him for Firdaus, for it is the highest part of Paradise, in the middle of Paradise, and from it spring the rivers of Paradise, and above it is the (Mighty) Throne of the Most Merciful."

Abu Hurairah said: "The Messenger of Allah (sallallahu alaihe wa-sallam) said: "There is not one among you who does not have two homes; a home in Paradise and a home in Hell. If he dies and enters Hell, the people of Paradise will inherit his home, and this is what Allah said: 'These are indeed the heirs.'"

== See also ==
- Zina
- Salah
- Zakaat
- Jannah
- Islamic eschatology
