= At-Tariq =

86th chapter of the Qur'an

Surah 86 of the Quran
الطارق Aṭ-Ṭāriq The Night Star
- Qira'ah; English text
- Classification: Meccan
- Other names: The Bright Star, The Night-Star, That Which Comes in the Night, The Nightly Visitant, The Night-comer
- Position: Juzʼ 30
- No. of verses: 17
- No. of words: 61
- No. of letters: 254

Aṭ-Ṭāriq (Arabic: الطارق, "the Morning Star", "Nightcomer"), is the eighty-sixth sura of the Quran, with 17 ayat or verses. Muslims generally believe this chapter was revealed in Mecca.

== Summary ==
- 1-3 Oath by the star of piercing brightness
- 4 Every soul has its guardian angel
- 5-8 God the Creator, and therefore can raise the dead
- 9-10 The judgment-day shall reveal secret thoughts
- 11-14 Oaths by heaven and earth that the Quran is God’s word
- 15-17 Muhammad exhorted to bear patiently with the unbelievers plotting his ruin

== Exegesis ==
The name Al-Târiq refers to anything that arrives at night. The star is called Târiq because it appears during the night. Al-Najm Al-Thâqib refers to a shining star that pierces the darkness with its light. Some scholars interpret it as the Pleiades but it could also be a pulsar, while others suggest it may refer to any bright, penetrating star.

The verse "There is no soul but that it has over it a protector" means that every soul has an angelic guardian who records its good and bad deeds.

== Hadith ==
According to hadith, Muhammad used to recite this surah in Zuhr prayer and Asr prayer.

- Jabir bin Samurah narrated: "For Zuhr and Asr, Allah's Messenger would recite: By the heavens, holding the Buruj (Surah 85) and (By the heavens and At-Tariq) and similar to them."
- Abu bin Ka’b reported that Muhammad said "Whoever recites Surah At-Tariq, Allah will grant him rewards equal to the number of stars in the Sky, multiplied by Ten good deeds"
- There is a narration from Imam Sadiq which says "Whoever recites Surah Tariq in his obligatory prayer would enjoy great prestige and position before Allah on the Day of Judgment and he would be among the friends of the prophets and their companions in Paradise."
