= Judgement Day in Islam =

Eschatalogical concept in Islam

In Islam, "the promise and threat" (waʿd wa-waʿīd) of Judgement Day (Arabic: یوم القيامة, romanized: Yawm al-qiyāmah, lit. 'Day of Resurrection' or Arabic: یوم الدین, romanized: Yawm ad-din, lit. 'Day of Judgement'), is when "all bodies will be resurrected" from the dead, and "all people" are "called to account" for their deeds and their faith during their life on Earth. It has been called "the dominant message" of the holy book of Islam, the Quran, (Note: "as it is presented in the context" of monotheism) and resurrection and judgement the two themes "central to the understanding of Islamic eschatology." Judgement Day is considered a fundamental tenet of faith by all Muslims, and one of the six articles of Islamic faith.

The trials, tribulations, and details associated with it are detailed in the Quran and the Hadith (sayings of Muhammad); these have been elaborated on in creeds, Quranic commentaries (tafsịrs), theological writing, eschatological manuals to provide more details and a sequence of events on the Day. Islamic expositors and scholarly authorities who have explained the subject in detail include al-Ghazali, Ibn Kathir, Ibn Majah, Muhammad al-Bukhari, and Ibn Khuzaymah.

== Names ==
Among the names of the Day of Resurrection/Judgement used in the Qur'an are:

- al-Qari'ah—the Calamity; (Arabic: ٱلۡقَارِعَةُ), Chapter (surah) 101 is named al-Qari'ah; the word is found in Q.69:4, 101:1, 101:2, 101:3
- al-Zalzalah—the Earthquake; (Arabic: الزَّلْزَلَة) Surah 99 is name al-Zalzalah; the word is found in Q.99.1
- al-Sa'iqah—the Blast;
- Yawm an Thaqila—the Hard Day;
- Al-Yawm al-Muhit—the Encompassing Day;
- Yawm al-Fasl—the Day of Separation;
- al-Tammah al-Kubra—the Great Disaster;
- al-Haqqah—the Reality;
- Yawm al-Din—the Day of Judgement;
- Yawm al-Haqq—the True (inevitable) Day;
- Yawm al-Ḥisāb—the Day of Reckoning;
- Yawm al-Khuruj—the Day of Exodus (from the graves);
- as-sa’a—the [Last] Hour (Arabic: ٱلسَّاعَةُ) is reportedly mentioned 39 times in the Qur’an (Note: from translation of the corresponding article in Arabic) (54:46, 25:11, 33:63, 30:55, 45:32, 69:2, 79:42, 30:12, 54:1, 43:66, 21:49, 30:14, 22:1, 22:7, 20:15, 40:59, 43:61, 42:17, 12:107, 15:85, 18:36, 45:27, 22:55, 43:85, 47:18, 6:40, 40:46, 42:18, 6:31, 16:77, etc.)
- Yawm al-Qiyamah—Day of Resurrection; (Arabic: يَوْمَ ٱلْقِيَـٰمَةِ) Literally means the "rising up at the resurrection" although it "has come to signify the entire series of events to take place" on Judgement day, "although technically "al-sā'a means the actual hour", according to scholars Jane Smith and Yvonne Haddad;
- On the Day of Resurrection (Nay! I do swear by the Day of Resurrection) it is mentioned 70 times in the Qur’an. (Note: from translation of the corresponding article in Arabic)

Related terms include (according to scholars Jane Smith and Yvonne Haddad),

- al-Ṣūr—"The Trumpet";
- fanāʾ—the "extinction of all save God".
- al-ḥashr "means the specific gathering together" of resurrected for their judging;
- baʿth "signifies the calling forth for judgement";
- al-maʿād—"the return", "the general term used by theologians for the entire process" of resurrection, judgement and consignment to heaven or hell.
- al-maḥshar—the terror of the place of assembly;
- al-mawqūf—the time of standing before God before being judged by God.

== Events ==
The events prophesied for the day of resurrection and judgement "are numerous and presented in varying ways", but "a sequence of the events" for the day can be made based on both the many details "suggested by the Qur'an" and also on "the elaborations and additions provided as usual by the hadiths, the manuals, and the interpretations of theologians". Four segments of end times in Islam can be presented:

1. the signs/portents of "The Hour" (as-sa’a) and other events heralding the imminent end of the world;
2. the soundings of the trumpet, the resurrection (qiyāma) of the dead, and the gathering together of all living beings (ḥashr);
3. the reckoning (ḥisāb) where the resurrected are judged;
4. the preparation for final consignment to heaven or hell, the crossing of the bridge (ṣirāṭ) that the damned fall off of to hell below, and the saved reach the other side, the possibility of intercession (shafā'a) to save sinners from hell.

=== Portents ===
Many verses of the Quran, especially the earlier ones, are dominated by the idea of the nearing of the Day of Resurrection. In Islam the signs of the coming of Judgement Day are described as "major" and "minor". The Al-Masih ad-Dajjal will appear, deceiving the foolish and killing Muslims until killed by either the Mahdi or Jesus. Following him, two dangerous, evil tribes of subhumans with vast numbers called Yajooj and Majooj will be released from where they have been imprisoned inside a mountain since Roman times. In addition, before the Day of Judgment, in the Sunni Hadith collections of Sahih al-Bukhari and Sahih Muslim it is said that the Muslims will fight the Jews and kill them. Seeking refuge, the tradition, the hadith, says, the Jews will hide behind stones and trees, but the stones and trees will call out, “Oh, Muslim, oh servant of God, a Jew is hiding behind me. Come and kill him.” And according to some narratives, a murderous tyrant called the Sufyani will spread corruption and mischief, killing women, children and descendants of Muhammad. To save believers from these horrors, the Mahdi will appear and Isa bin Maryam (Jesus) will descend from heaven to assist him. The sun will rise from the west. A breeze will blow causing all believers to inhale it and die peacefully. (Note: Sahih Muslim, Book 001: 0273)

=== Destruction and resurrection ===
Following these portents, the Earth will be destroyed. (In surah Al-Haqqah)

When the trumpet is blown with a single blast
and the earth and the mountains are lifted up and crushed with a single blow,
then, on that day, the terror shall come to pass,
and heaven shall be split, for upon that day it shall be very frail. ... "

(Q.69:13–16) (Note: (Arberry translation) see also Q.39:68)

Verses from another surah (At-Takwir) describe

When the sun shall be darkened
When the stars shall be thrown down
When the seas shall be set boiling
When the souls shall be coupled, ...
When the scrolls shall be unrolled
When heavens shall be stripped off,
When Hell shall be set blazing,
When Paradise shall be brought nigh
Then shall a soul know what it has produced.

(Q.81:1,2,6,7,10-14) (Note: (Arberry translation))

A second trumpet blast will signal a "final cataclysm" (fanāʼ), the extinction of all living creatures – even the angel of death himself – save God. God will then ask three times, "'To whom belongs the Kingdom this day?' No one answers Him so He answers Himself, saying, 'To God who is one alone, victorious!'" Numerous Qur'anic mentions that every soul will taste death during "the hour" are thought to underscore the absolute power and tawḥīd of God while the resurrection of life demonstrates "His justice and mercy". The time between annihilation of all life and its resurrection is both "beyond all human time constructs" and generally estimated by many commentators to be forty years.

==== Resurrection ====
The Afterlife will commence with a trumpet blast (different sources give different numbers of trumpet blasts), (Note: one trumpet blast Q.69:13; two blasts in Q.39:68, "some eschatological manuals" expand this to three (a belief also expressed in some Jewish traditions).; the Qur'an itself "does not make explicit the chronology" involved with the blowing(s) of the horn" and "the traditions do not present a consistent picture"; but "The general understanding seems to be" that Isrāfīl will be the first of creation to be resurrected and he will give the blast that brings the dead back to life.) signaling the "Day of the Arising", according to the classical Islamic scholar and theologian al-Ghazali.

The sounding of the trumpet is mentioned at least two times in the Qur'an, but "the Qur'an itself does not make explicit the chronology involved with the blowing(s) of the horn" and "it has been for the followers of the Prophet to determine for themselves the exact sequence of events after that."

Know that Isrāfīl is the master of the horn [al-qarn]. God created the preserved tablet [al-lawḥ al-maḥfuz] of white pearl. Its length is seven times the distance between the heaven and the earth and it is connected to the Throne. All that exists until the day of resurrection is written on it. Isrāfīl has four wings—one in the East, one in the West, one covering his legs and one shielding his head and face in fear of God. His head is inclined toward the Throne .... No angel is nearer to the throne than Isrāfīl. Seven veils are between him and the Throne, each veil five hundred years distance from the next ...

This will wake the dead from their graves. Bodies will be resurrected and reunited with their spirits to form "whole, cognizant, and responsible persons". The first to arise will be the members of the Muslim community, according to "an often-quoted saying" of Muhammad, but will be "subdivided into categories" based on their sins while on earth. The classification of the resurrected into groups comes from "certain narratives" about Judgement Day that "suggest" the grouping, and are based on "a number of scattered verses in the Qur'an indicating the woeful condition" of resurrected sinners.

In the time between resurrection and judgement will be an agonizing wait (Q.21:103, Q.37:20) at the place of assembly [al-maḥshar], or the time of standing before God [al-mawqūf], giving sinners "ample opportunity to contemplate the imminent recompense for his past faults" (just as sinners suffer in the grave before Resurrection Day). The resurrected will gather for "The Perspiration" — a time when all created beings, including men, angels, jinn, devils and animals will sweat, unshaded from the sun, awaiting their fate. Sinners and nonbelievers will suffer and sweat longer on this day, which some say will last for "50,000 years" (based on Q.70:4) and others only 1000 (based on Q.32:5).

=== Judgment ===
The final judgment (Reckoning, ḥisāb) where God judges each soul for their lives lived on earth, will be "carried out with absolute justice" accepting no excuses, and examine every act and intention—no matter how small, but "through the prerogative of God's merciful will".

Quran verses in Al-Haqqah (surah 69) are thought to refer to the reckoning on Judgement Day:

As for the one who is given his book in his right hand, he will say: Take and read my book.
I knew that I would be called to account.
And he will be in a blissful condition (Q.69:19–21) ....
But as for him who is given his book in his left hand, he will say: Would that my book had not been given to me
and that I did not know my reckoning! (Q.69:25-26) ...
[And it will be said] Seize him and bind him and expose

him to the burning Fire!(Q.69:30-31)

"The book" is thought to refer to an account each person has, chronicling the deeds of their life, good and bad. Commentators reports "affirm" that each day in a person's life, "one or two angels" begin a new page, inscribing deeds, and that upon completion, the pages are assembled "in some fashion ... into a full scroll or record". On Judgement Day the book is presented to the right hand of the resurrected person if they are going to Jannah, and left if they are to be sent to Jahannam.

Another version of how the resurrected are judged ("particular elements that make up the occasion of the reckoning" in the Quran are not ordered or grouped and are called "modalities of judgement") involves several references in the Quran to mīzān (balance), which some commentators believe refers to a way of balancing the weight of an individual's good deeds and bad on Judgement day, to see which is heavier, as the occurrence stated in Kitāb aḥwāl al-qiyāma, which will span in fifty thousand years.

It is believed those whose good deeds outweigh their bad will be assigned to Jannah (heaven), and those whose bad deeds outweigh the good, Jahannam (hell). How much weight is given to internal and how much to external iman, how much to piety and how much to obedience to Islamic law (the two being intertwined, of course), in the tabulation of good deeds and earning salvation, varies according to the interpretation of scholars. In one manual (Kitāb aḥwāl al-qiyāma), hopeful humans are questioned about their behaviour not before they head on the path/bridge (aṣ-ṣirāṭ; see below) to heaven, but during. As they walk the bridge, said to have seven arches, "each 3,000 years in length"; they are interrogated at each arch about a specific religious duty prescribed by the shari'a -- their īmān, their prayer ṣalāt, almsgiving zakāt, pilgrimage ḥajj, ritual washings wudū', ghusl, and responsibility to their relatives", respectively.

While there is no Original Sin in Islam, the Quran does mention the many inherent flaws in the personalities of human beings – weakness, greed, stinginess, pride, etc. (Note: God created man in the best of molds (Q.15:4), yet; Man has been created weak, (Q.4:28. Q.90:4); Truly man is ungrateful to his Lord, and he bears witness to that; (Q.100:6–7); Even though humankind has been given authority in the earth and provided with every means for life's fulfillment, thanks are not rendered (Q.7:10); As well as being ungrateful, he is also impatient, fretful, and stingy (Q.70:19–21); greedy (Q.74:15); violent in his pursuit of wealth (Q.100:8); Full of pride and self-conceit, he forgets that his position and all things afforded to him are by the grace of God and in rebelling against God thinks of himself as self-sufficient (Q.96:6–7).)

What the common order is of Judgement Day at this point is unclear based on hadith as they disagree on the way God reveals to "the various categories of individuals what their fate is to be".

There are special conditions to those who did not receive teachings of Islam during their life accordingly, the people of the period are judged differently on the Day of Judgement. There is a difference of opinion between scholars of Islam on their afterlife. The rationalist Mu'tazilites believed that every accountable person (Arabic: مكلف, mukallaf) must reject polytheism and idolatry and believe in an All-Powerful God. Failure to meet these requirements would result in eternal punishment.

On the other hand, the Ash'aris believed that those who did not receive the message would be forgiven, even idolaters. Their premise was that good and evil is based upon revelation; in other words, good and evil are defined by God. Therefore, in the absence of revelation, they cannot be held accountable.

Abu Hamid al-Ghazali categorized non-Muslims into three categories:

1. People who never heard of the message, who live in far away lands, such as the Byzantines ("Romans"). These will be forgiven.
2. People who were exposed to a distorted understanding of Islam and have no recourse to correct that information. These too will be forgiven.
3. People who heard of Islam because they live in neighboring lands and mix with Muslims. These have no hope of salvation.

He also wrote about non-Muslims who have heard a distorted message: "The name of Muhammad has indeed reached their ears, but they do not know his true description and his character. Instead, they heard from the time they were young that a deceitful liar named Muhammad claimed to be a prophet. As far as I am concerned, such people are [excused] like those who the call of Islam has not reached, for while they have heard of the Prophet’s name, they heard the opposite of his true qualities. And hearing such things would never arouse one’s desire to find out who he was."

Imam Nawawi said in his commentary Sharh Sahih Muslim that those who are born into idolatrous families and die without a message reaching them are granted paradise based upon the Qur'anic verse 17:15: "We do not punish a people until a messenger comes to them.". According to ibn Taymiyyah, these people who did not receive the message in this world will be tested in the afterlife, or Barzakh. This view also shared and accepted by Ibn Qayyim al-Jawziyya, Abu Hasan al-Ash'ari, and Ibn Kathir, as they all based this ruling according to Hadith about the fates of four kinds of peoples:

1. Those who never received the call or teaching to Islam during their life
2. Those who suffered deafness before the teaching of Islam reached them
3. Those with mental illness and severe insanity (in another Hadith with similar narration also those with mental deficiency or low intelligence disabilities which prevent them to understand Islam properly)
4. Those who had suffered senility or dementia when the words of Islam reached them (Note: These hadiths were narrated with the chains of narration ended by Abu Hurairah and Al-Aswad bin Sari and graded as hasan (sound) hadith according to Shuaib Al Arna'ut, while Ahmad ibn Hanbal, Al-Albani, and Al-Tabarani grade it as saheeh. Meanwhile, another Hadith with similar narration from Anas ibn Malik also used for this ruling.)

According to Ibn Qayyim, Ibn Taymiyya, and other Islamic scholars who agreed on this Hadiths, this means those four type of peoples would be further examined by Allah in Barzakh, where these four type of person will be tested in the state where their senses and their minds in perfect condition, so they can understand they are being tested examined by God.

Muhammad Nasiruddin al-Albani, a Salafi scholar, stated on this matter: “The term Ahl al-Fatrah refers to everyone whom the dawah (message of Islam) has not reached in a correct manner as it came in the Shariah… Such people will not be punished on the Day of Judgement [for their disbelief in this world]. It is quite possible for People of the Interval to exist in every time period, whether before [the revelation of the final message of] Islam or after. The message has to have reached them in its pristine purity, without any distortions. In cases where the dawah reaches people in a mutilated form in which its essential components; its fundamental principles of belief, have been substituted, I am the first to say that the dawah has not reached them.”

=== The crossing of the Bridge ===
The saved and the damned now being clearly distinguished, the souls will traverse over hellfire via the bridge of sirat.

˹They will be told,˺ "This is the Day of ˹Final˺ Decision which you used to deny."
˹Allah will say to the angels,˺ "Gather ˹all˺ the wrongdoers along with their peers, and whatever they used to worship
instead of Allah, then lead them ˹all˺ to the path of Hell [ṣirāṭ al-jahīm].
And detain them, for they must be questioned."

˹Then they will be asked,˺ "What is the matter with you that you can no longer help each other?" (Q.37:21–25)

Muhammad, leading the Muslim Ummah, will be first across the bridge. For sinners, the bridge will be thinner than hair and sharper than the sharpest sword, impossible to walk on without falling below to arrive at their fiery destination, while for the righteous, the bridge will be as wide as a highway, so they can easily run across. This way, the righteous will proceed across the bridge to paradise (Jannah).

This story is based on verses in the Quran (Q.36:66, Q.37:23–24), both of which "are rather indefinite". Only Q.37:23–24 mentioning hell in the form of al-jahīm with ṣirāṭ at least sometimes being translated as 'path' rather than 'bridge'. ṣirāṭ al-jahīm "was adopted into Islamic tradition to signify the span over jahannam, the top layer of the Fire". (Note: "The idea of a bridge crossing to the underworld has found expression in a number of different religious traditions")

=== Intercession ===
Not everyone consigned to hell will remain there. Somewhat like the Catholic concept of purgatory, sinful Muslims will stay in hell until purified of their sins. According to the scholar Al-Subki (and others), "God will take out of the Fire everyone who has said the testimony" (i.e. the shahāda testimony made by all Muslims, "There is no God but God, Muhammad is his prophet") "all but the mushrikun, those who have committed the worst sin of impugning the tawḥīd of God, have the possibility of being saved."

The possibility of intercession on behalf of sinners (shafaʿa) on Judgement Day to save them from hellfire, is a "major theme" in the eschatological expectations of the Muslim community and in stories told about the events of Judgement Day.

While Quran "is both generally and clearly negative" in regard to the possibility of intercession on behalf of sinners (shafaʿa) on the last day" to save them from hellfire, (Note: The Quran mentions shafaʿa in some form 29 times. Some examples are: "Protect yourselves against a day when no soul will be able to recompense another in any way and no intercession will be accepted ... (Q.2:48); "Warn those who fear that they will be gathered to their Lord; there will be for them no friend and no intercessor aside from Him ... (Q.6:51).) (the idea being every individual must take responsibility for their own deeds and acts of faith). In the 20+ occurrences of shafa'a in the Quran none mention Muhammad or the office of prophethood. However this principle was "modified in the ensuing understanding of the community, and the Prophet Muhammad was invested with the function of intervening on behalf of the Muslims on the day of judgement". Verse Q.43:86 authorizes "true witnesses" to grant intercession, and in this category "has been found for the inclusion" of Muhammad "as an intercessor for the Muslim community.

"One of the most popular and often-cited" stories about Muḥammad as intercessor ("validating" his ability to intercede) revolves around sinners turning to him after being turned down for intercession by all the other prophets. In al-Durra by al-Ghazali, this happens "between the two soundings of the trumpet".

Another story found in Kitāb Aḥwāl al-Qiyāma relates

[The Prophet Muḥammad] will come with the prophets and will bring out from the Fire all who used to say "There is no God but God and Muḥammad is the Messenger of God. ... " He will then bring them out all together, charred from the Fire having eaten at them. Then he will hurry with them to a river near the gate of the Garden, called [the river of] life. There they will bathe and emerge from it as beardless youths, with kohled eyes and faces like the moon.

=== Paradise and Hellfire ===
The "events" of "the judgement process" are concluded with the arrival of resurrected at their final "abode of recompense": either paradise for the saved or hell for the damned. The Quran describes habitation within the abodes in "exquisite detail", while "a wealth of picturesque specifics" (their shapes, structures, etc.) are elaborated on by hadith and other Islamic literature. Much of Islamic cosmology comes from "earlier world views" (the circles of damnation, seven layers of heaven above the earth, fires of purgation below of Mesopotamian and/or Jewish belief) with Quranic verses interpreted to harmonize with these.

While critics have charged that the concept of afterlife in Islam is "very materialistic", the afterlife punishment of hell and pleasure of heaven are all not only physical, but psychic and spiritual. Their characteristics having matching features or direct parallels with each other. The pleasure and delights of Jannah described in the Quran, are matched by the excruciating pain and horror of Jahannam, Both are commonly believed to have seven levels, in both cases, the higher the level, the more desirable—in Jannah the higher the prestige and pleasure, in Jahannam the less the suffering. Both feature prominent trees – the Zaqqum tree of hell opposite the lote tree of paradise. The common belief among Muslims holds that both abodes coexists with the temporal world, rather than being created after Judgement Day.

==== Paradise ====
Paradise, Jannah (Arabic: جَنّة, romanized: janna, or 'the garden'), is the final abode of the righteous. Jannah is described with physical pleasures such as gardens, rivers, fountains; lovely houris that no man has touched before, wine that does not make drunk, and "divine pleasure". Their reward of pleasure will vary according to the righteousness of the person.

==== Hellfire ====
Punishment and suffering in hell in mainstream Islam varies according to the sins of the condemned person. It is commonly believed by Muslims that confinement to hell is temporary for Muslims but not for others. (Note: "One should note there was a near consensus among Muslim theologians of the later periods that punishment for Muslim grave sinners would only be temporary; eventually after a purgatory sojourn in hell's top layer they would be admitted into paradise.")

Physically hell is described in different ways by different Quranic verses, hadith, and other Islamic literature. It is enormous in size, and located below heaven. It has seven levels but it is also said to be a huge pit over which the bridge of As-Sirāt crosses; it has mountains, rivers, valleys and "even oceans" filled with disgusting fluids; but like a sentient being, is also to be able to walk (controlled by reins), and ask questions.

== Literal or figurative interpretation ==
While early Muslims debated whether scripture on Judgement day should be interpreted literally or figuratively, the school of thought that prevailed (Ashʿarī) "affirmed that such things as" connected with Judgement day as "the individual records of deeds (including the paper, pen, and ink with which they are inscribed), the bridge, the balance, and the pond" are "realities", and "to be understood in a concrete and literal sense." Regarding heaven and hell, today, "the vast majority of believers", (according to Smith and Haddad), understand verses of the Quran on Jannah (and hellfire) "to be real and specific, anticipating them" with joy or terror, although this view "has generally not insisted that the realities of the next world will be identical with those of this world". On the other hand, since "the time and chronology are less important than the ultimate significance of resurrection and judgement "as a whole", the point of stories of Judgement day in the eschatological manuals is to be "didactic" not accurate, i.e. to raise awareness of "the threat and promise" of the message of Islam even if most of the story is based not on the verses of the Quran but on the author's imagination. The eschatological manual Kitāb aḥwāl al-qiyāma, for example, describes the Fire/Hell terrifyingly but implausibly as having "four legs (between each leg 1000 years), thirty heads with 30,000 mouths each, lips like 1000 mountains, and so on".

== Similarities to the Judgement Day of Christianity ==
Islamic and Christian eschatology both have a "Day of Resurrection" of the dead (yawm al-qiyāmah), followed by a "Day of Judgement" (yawm ad-din) where all human beings who have ever lived will be held accountable for their deeds by being judged by God. Depending on the verdict of the judgement, they will be sent for eternity to either the reward of paradise (Jannah) or the punishment of hell (Jahannam).

Some of the similarities between Christian and Islamic eschatology include: when exactly Judgement day will occur will be known only to God; it will be announced by a trumpet blast; it will be preceded by strange and terrible events serving as portents; Jesus will return to earth (but in different roles); battles will be fought with an Antichrist and Gog and Magog; righteous believers will not be among the living when the world ends.

As in the First and Second Epistle of John of the New Testament, an "Antichrist" figure appears in Islam, known (in Islam) as (Arabic: دجّال) Al-Masīḥ ad-Dajjāl, literally "Deceitful Messiah". The Dajjal, like the Antichrist, performs miracles, or at least what appear to be miracles. (In Islam, the Dajjal and many of his followers are prophesied to be killed by Jesus's breath, just as in the second chapter of 2 Thessalonians it says "Jesus will destroy with the breath of his mouth, annihilating him by the manifestation of his coming", some unnamed "lawless" figure.

As in the Christian Book of Revelation (where they are to fight a "final battle with Christ and his saints"), Gog and Magog will be released, after being imprisoned for thousands of years in a mountain, to wage war against the righteous. In an event somewhat similar to the Rapture concept in Christianity (Note: (A version of the Rapture occurring in end times))—where at some time near the end of the world all Christian believers disappear and are carried off to heaven—in Islam one of the very last signs of the imminent arrival of the end of the world will be a "pleasant" or "cold" wind, that brings a peaceful death to all Muslim believers, leaving only unbelievers alive to face the end of the world. Jesus (known in Islam as Isa) will make a second coming in Islam, but not to preside over Last Judgement. Instead he will help another Islamic saviour figure ("The Mahdi"), crush evildoers and restore order and justice before the end of the world, including (according to some Islamic hadiths) correcting the erring ways of the world's Christians by converting them to Islam.

Muslims believe that similarities between Abrahamic religions of Judaism, Christianity and Islam are because they're all the same "Word of God" as sent by his prophets throughout history. The differences (most notably Muhammad's absence) from the first two are said to be corruptions incurred by those books throughout history, with Islam claiming it cannot be corrupted and it therefore being the "final word".

== See also ==
- Glossary of Islam
- Outline of Islam
- Index of Islam-related articles
- Islamic eschatology
- Signs of the coming of Judgement Day
- Jannah
- Jahannam
- Final Judgement
- Eschatology
