= Al-Balad =

90th chapter of the Qur'an

Surah 90 of the Quran
البلد Al-Balad The City
- Qira'ah; English text
- Classification: Meccan
- Other names: The City
- No. of verses: 20
- No. of words: 82
- No. of letters: 342

Al-Balad
Recitation of Al-Balad in mujawwad.

Al-Balad (Arabic: البلد, "The City") is the 90th Surah or chapter of the Qur'an. It is composed of 20 ayat (verses).

== Summary ==
- 1-7 Man, though created in misery, yet boasts of his riches
- 8-16 Captives to be freed and the poor and orphan to be fed
- 17-20 Description of the companions of the right and left hand

Sayyid Qutb (d. 1966), who was an Egyptian author, Islamist, and leading intellectual of the Egyptian Muslim Brotherhood, summarised the overall theme of Surat Al-Lail in the introduction to his extensive Quranic commentary, Fi Zilal al-Qur'an (In the shades of the Qur'an) by saying:

This short sūrah touches on a great many facts which are of central importance to human life. Its style is characterized by powerful allusions. Numerous facts of this nature are not easily combined in any form of concise writing except that of the Qur’ān, with its unique ability to hit the right chords with such swift and penetrating strokes.
— Sayid Qutb, Fi Zilal al-Qur'an

== Hadith ==
According to a narration from Imam Jafar al-Sadiq, whoever recites Surah al-Balad in obligatory prayers will be among the righteous in this world and will have a special status with God in the Hereafter, and will be among the companions of the prophets, martyrs, and righteous.

The Prophet also said about this Surah: Whoever recites Surah al-Balad, God will protect them from His wrath on the Day of Judgment.
