= Al-Maarij =

70th chapter of the Qur'an

Surah 70 of the Quran
المعارج Al-Maʻārij The Ascending Stairways
- Qira'ah; English text
- Classification: Meccan
- Other names: The Heights, The Ladders, The Stairways, The Ways of Ascent
- Position: Juzʼ 29
- No. of verses: 44
- No. of Rukus: 2
- No. of words: 217
- No. of letters: 971

Al-Maʻārij (Arabic: المعارج, “The Ascending Stairways”) is the seventieth chapter (sūrah) of the Qur'an, with 44 verses (āyāt). The Surah takes its name from the word dhil Ma'arij in the third ayah. The word appears twice in the Quran. Abdullah Yusuf Ali, an Indian Islamic scholar, introduces the surah as “... another Islamic eschatology Surah closely connected in subject matter with the last one. Patience and the mystery of Time will show the ways that climb the Heaven. Sin and Goodness must each eventually come to its own.”

== Summary ==
- 1 A man demanded that the day of judgment might come at once
- 2–4 The day, whose space is fifty thousand years, will surely come
- 5-9 Muhammad to bear the insults of the infidels patiently, because judgment is near
- 10-18 Riches, family, and friends will not save the wicked from hell
- 19-24 The wicked are niggardly in health, but full of complaint when evil befalleth
- 25-35 The character of true believers
- 36-41 Unbelievers need entertain no hope they shall escape destruction
- 42-44 Muhammad counselled to permit the unbelieving Makkans to sport themselves, because their damnation is near

== Probable date of revelation ==
Regarding the period of revelation of this surah, first one notes that this surah is Meccan. This defines the period of revelation of this surah before 622 AD, the year of Hijra (Islam). In his translation of the Qur'an, one of the most widely known and used in the English-speaking world, Abdullah Yusuf Ali says “Chronologically it belongs to the late early middle Makkan period, possibly soon after Surah 69.” Sayyid Abul Ala Maududi in his Tafsir work Tafhim al-Qur'an writes: “The subject matter bears evidence that this Surah too was sent down in conditions closely resembling those under which Surah Al Haaqqah was sent down”. And records a tradition by Musnad Ahmad ibn Hanbal when Umar ibn Khattab told that he heard Muhammad reciting sura Al-Haaqqa Masjid al-Haram. Umar ibn Khattab accepted Islam in 616 AD so the surah Al-Ma'arij thus appears to reveal before 616 AD. Israr Ahmed, a Pakistani Islamic theologian, philosopher, and noted Islamic scholar, also holds the opinion that this surah was revealed in the 5th or 6th year of revelation and cites Fakhr al-Din al-Razi and Abdul-Qadir Gilani in reference. Theodor Nöldeke places this chapter immediately after chapters lvi. and liii., probably because of the allusion of the first verse of this chapter to the beginning of chapter lvi. Muir places it in about the same period of time, which would fix the date at about the fifth year of the call of Muhammad to preach.

== Asbab al-nuzul ==
Asbāb al-nuzūl, an Arabic term meaning "occasions/circumstances of revelation", is a secondary genre of Qur'anic exegesis (tafsir) directed at establishing the context in which specific verses of the Qur'an were revealed. Though of some use in reconstructing the Qur'an's historicity, asbāb is by nature an exegetical rather than a historiographical genre, and as such usually associates the verses it explicates with general situations rather than specific events. Nasa'i and other traditionists have related a tradition from Ibn 'Abbas, and Hakim hold it as authentic, that Nadr bin al-Harith Kaladah had said "O God, if it is really the Truth sent down by You, then rain down stones on us from the heavens, or send down any other painful torment on us." (AI-Anfal: 32). The person here meant is generally supposed to have been al Nudár Ibn al Hárith, who said, ‘O God, if what Muhammad preaches be the truth from thee, rain down upon us a shower of stones, or send some dreadful judgment to punish us.’ Others, however, think it was Abú Jahl, who challenged Muhammad to cause a fragment of heaven to fall on them."—Sale, Baidawi.

Abdul-Qadir Gilani, an influential Islamic Sufi religious figure, teacher, preacher and writer, however, holds the opinion that the demand for torment referred in the first ayah of this surah was made by Prophet Muhammad himself for the disbelievers due to the increasing Persecution of Muslims by the Meccans. And for example Dr. Israr Ahmed cites the demand of torment by prophet Nūḥ against his people in the next surah which is also the pair of surah Al-Ma'arij. For references, Dr. Ahmed cites the works of Fakhr al-Din al-Razi and Abdul-Qadir Gilani.

=== Shia view ===
Shia scholars argue that Nadr ibn al-Harith was beheaded, which can not be regarded as a punishment from Allah (Al-Maarij- Aya 3). Instead, they narrate that the casualty was "Nu'man ibn al-Harith" when he ridiculed Muhammad after Ghadir Khumm event, then a stone from the sky halved him.

== Theme and subject matter ==
Sayyid Qutb an Egyptian author, educator and Islamic theorist in his magnum opus, Fi Zilal al-Quran (In the shade of the Qur'an), a 30-volume commentary on the Qur'an, summarizes the overview of surah Al-Ma'arij in these words: "We may say that this surah represents a round in the long, hard battle the Qur'an fights within the human soul, going deep inside it to eradicate all lingering traces of jahiliyyah. This battle is greater and longer lasting than the wars the Muslims later had to fight against their many enemies." He further elaborates:

The major issue the surah focuses on is that of the hereafter and peoples requital for what they do during their lives on earth, particularly the punishment suffered by the unbelievers. In order to establish the truth of the hereafter, the surah speaks of how the human soul reacts to situations of hardship and comfort. Such reactions differ greatly between a believer and one who is devoid of faith. The surah also provides an outline of the believers' main features, their feelings and behaviour, and it states how they deserve to be honoured. It also shows that the unbelievers are held in disregard by God, and gives a picture of the humiliation prepared for them. It is a humiliation the arrogant thoroughly deserve. Furthermore, the surah establishes the fact that values, standards and scales applied by God are different from those which human beings uphold. "

—Sayid Qutb, Fi Zilal al-Qur'an

Javed Ahmad Ghamidi (b. 1951), a well-known Pakistani Muslim theologian, Quran scholar and exegete, and educationist, classifies surah Al-Ma'arij as a pair with the last one with regard to the subject discussed in them. He also suggests that the primary audience of surah Al-Ma'arij is leadership of the Quraysh. Regarding the central theme of the surah Ghamidi summarizes:

The central theme of Surah Ma‘arij is to warn those among the Quraysh of their fate who are making fun of the consequences of denying the Inzar of the Qur’an about the Day of Judgement and are asking to hasten their advent, and to urge the Prophet (sws) to persevere in the cause of truth and to tell the unbelievers that Paradise is the reward of all good deeds; a person whose evil deeds outnumber his good ones even if he is from the high ups of the society shall never enter this everlasting kingdom.—Ghamidi

The major scholars of Islam agree (Ijma) about the theme and subject matter of this surah. In fact the study of surah Al-Marij stated by various scholars overlaps each other. Just like the above-mentioned exegetes, Muhammad Farooq-i-Azam Malik states his understanding of the Major Issues, Divine Laws and Guidance in surah Al-Ma'arij as:

"The whole Surah is meant to answer this question saying: "Resurrection, which they desire to be hastened out of jest and fun, is terrible, and when it comes, it will cause great distress to the culprits. At that time they will even be prepared to give away their wives and children and their nearest kinfolks in ransom to escape the punishment, but they will not be able to escape it. On that Day, the destinies of mankind will be decided strictly on the basis of their belief and their conduct. Those who turn away from the Truth in this world, amass wealth and withhold it from the needy, will be doomed to hell; and those who fear the punishment of Allah, believe in the Hereafter, establish Salah (keep up the prayers), discharge the rights of the needy out of their wealth, strictly avoid immoral and wicked deeds, practise honesty in all their dealings, fulfill their pledges and trust and bear true witness, will have a place of honor in paradise" - Muhammad Farooq-i-Azam Malik

== Contents ==
The Quranic text has been divided into separate rukus in terms of thematically related Ayah. This surah contains 2 rukus. The contents of the 1st Ruku states that the day of judgement will be equal to fifty thousand years and disbelievers will wish to save themselves from the punishment at the expense of their children, wives, brothers and relatives, but it will not happen. 2nd Ruku starts from ayah 36 and continues uptill the end of the surah and it states that the Paradise is not for the disbelievers and Disbelievers will have downcast eyes and countenances distorted with shame.

Another noticeable fact about this surah needs to be addressed that passage 70:29 to 70:32 is completely identical to the passage Al-Mu'minoon 23:5 to 23:8. About this presence of repetition Michael Sells, citing the work of the critic Norman O. Brown, acknowledges Brown's observation that the seeming disorganization of Quranic literary expression – its scattered or fragmented mode of composition in Sells's phrase – is in fact a literary device capable of delivering profound effects as if the intensity of the prophetic message were shattering the vehicle of human language in which it was being communicated. Sells also addresses the much-discussed repetitiveness of the Quran, seeing this, too, as a literary device.

A text is self-referential when it speaks about itself and makes reference to itself. According to Stefan Wild, the Quran demonstrates this meta-textuality by explaining, classifying, interpreting and justifying the words to be transmitted. Self-referentiality is evident in those passages when the Quran refers to itself as revelation (tanzil), remembrance (dhikr), news (naba'), criterion (furqan) in a self-designating manner (explicitly asserting its Divinity, "And this is a blessed Remembrance that We have sent down; so are you now denying it?" (21:50), or in the frequent appearance of the 'Say' tags, when Muhammad is commanded to speak (e.g. "Say: 'God's guidance is the true guidance' ", "Say: 'Would you then dispute with us concerning God?' "). To Wild, the Quran is highly self-referential. The feature is more evident in early Meccan chapters.

Abul A'la Maududi (September 25, 1903 – September 22, 1979) was a journalist, theologian, Muslim revivalist leader and political philosopher, and a 20th-century Islamist thinker in India, and later Pakistan. He was also a political figure in Pakistan and was the first recipient of King Faisal International Award for his services in 1979. He summarizes the contents of the surah in these words:

It admonishes and gives warning to the disbelievers who made fun of the news about Resurrection and the Hereafter, and Hell and Heaven, and challenged the Holy Prophet (upon whom be peace) to cause Resurrection with which he threatened them to take place if what he said was true and they had become worthy of the punishment in Hell by denying it. The whole Surah is meant to answer this denial.

The Surah opens with words to the effect: "A demander has demanded a torment, the torment which must befall the deniers; and when it takes place, there will be none to prevent it, but it will take place at its own appointed time. Allah has His own way of doing things, but He is not unjust. Therefore, have patience, O Prophet, at what they say. They think it is far off, but We see it as near at hand."

Then it is said:"Resurrection, which they desire to be hastened out of jest and fun, is terrible, and when it comes, it will cause great distress to the culprits. At that time they will even be prepared to give away their wives and children and their nearest kinsfolk in ransom to escape the punishment, but they will not be able to escape it.

Then the people have been warned to the effect; "On that Day the destinies of men will be decided strictly on the basis of their belief and their conduct. Those who turn away from the Truth in the world and amass wealth and withhold it from the needy, will be doomed to Hell; and those who fear the punishment of God here, believe in the Hereafter, keep up the Prayer, discharge the rights of the needy out of their wealth, strictly avoid immoral and wicked deeds, practice honesty in all their dealings, fulfill their pledges and trust and bear true witness, will have a place of honor in Paradise"

In conclusion, the disbelievers of Makkah who rushed in upon the Holy Prophet (upon whom be peace) from every side as soon as they saw him, in order to make fun of him, have been warned to the effect: "If you do not believe, Allah will replace you by other people who will be better than you", and the Holy Prophet (upon whom be peace) has been consoled, so as to say: "Do not take to heart their mockery and jesting; leave them to indulge in their idle talk and foolish conduct if they are bent upon experiencing the disgrace and humiliation of the Resurrection; they will themselves see their evil end."'—Abul A'la Maududi, Tafhim-ul-Quran

== See also ==
- Ma malakat aymanukum
- Al-Mu'minoon
