= Al-Qaria =

101st chapter of the Qur'an

Surah 101 of the Quran
القارعة Al-Qāriʻah The Calamity
- Qira'ah; English text
- Classification: Meccan
- Other names: The Striking Hour
- Position: Juzʼ 30
- No. of verses: 11
- No. of words: 36
- No. of letters: 158

Al-Qaria
Recitation of Al-Qaria in mujawwad.

Al-Qaria or The Calamity (Arabic: القارعة, al-Qāriʻah, also known as The Striking), is the 101st chapter (sūrah) of the Quran, with 11 āyāt or verses. This chapter takes its name from its first word "qariah", referring to the Quranic view of the end time and eschatology. "Qariah" has been translated as calamity, striking, catastrophe and clatterer. According to Ibn Kathir, a traditionalistic exegete, Al-Qariah is one of the names of the Day of Judgement, like Al-Haaqqa, At-Tammah, As-Sakhkhah and others.

== Summary ==
- 1-5 The day of judgment a day of calamity
- 6-9 The good and bad shall be judged according to their works
- 10-11 Háwíyah described

After a picturesque depiction of judgement day in first 5 verses, next 4 verses (ayat) describe that God's Court will be established and the people will be called upon to account for their deeds. The people whose good deeds will be heavier, will be blessed with bliss and happiness, and the people whose good deeds will be lighter, will be cast into the burning fire of hell.

The last 2 verses describe Háwíyah in a similar emphatic way as Al-Qariah was emphasized in the beginning. According to the Papal translator, Ludovico Marracci, the original word Hâwiyat is the name of the lowest dungeon of hell, and properly signifies a deep pit or gulf. Jewish to Muslim convert, Muhammad Asad comments here: Lit., "his mother [i.e., goal] will be an abyss" (of suffering and despair). According to Quranite translator, Sam Gerrans, the term "mother" (umm) is used idiomatically to denote something that embraces or enfolds.

== Text ==
=== Text and transliteration ===
بِسْمِ ٱللَّهِ ٱلرَّحْمَٰنِ ٱلرَّحِيمِ
Bismi l-lahi r-raḥmāni r-raḥīm(i)
ٱلْقَارِعَةُ ۝
^{1} ’al qāri‘ah(tu)
مَا ٱلْقَارِعَةُ ۝
^{2} Ma l-qāri‘ah(tu)
وَمَآ أَدْرَىٰكَ مَا ٱلْقَارِعَةُ ۝
^{3} Wa mā ’adrāka ma l-qāri‘ah(tu)
يَوْمَ يَكُونُ ٱلنَّاسُ كَٱلْفَرَاشِ ٱلْمَبْثُوثِ ۝
^{4} Yawma yakūnu n-nāsu kalfarāshi l-mabthūth(i)
وَتَكُونُ ٱلْجِبَالُ كَٱلْعِهْنِ ٱلْمَنفُوشِ ۝
^{5} Watakūnu l-jibālu kal‘ihni l-manfūsh(i)
فَأَمَّا مَن ثَقُلَتْ مَوَٰزِينُهُۥ ۝
^{6} Fa’ammā man thaqulat mawāzīnuh(ū)
فَهُوَ فِى عِيشَةٍ رَّاضِيَةٍ ۝
^{7} Fahuwa fī ‘īshati r-rāḍiyah(tin)
وَأَمَّا مَنْ خَفَّتْ مَوَٰزِينُهُۥ ۝
^{8} Wa’ammā man khaffat mawāzīnuh(ū)
فَأُمُّهُۥ هَاوِيَةٌ ۝
^{9} Fa’ummuhū hāwiyah(tun)
وَمَآ أَدْرَىٰكَ مَا هِيَهْ ۝
^{10} Wamā ’adrāka mā hiyah
نَارٌ حَامِيَةٌۢ ۝
^{11} Nārun ḥāmiyah(tun)

== Name of the surah ==
Jalaluddin Al-Suyuti, co-author of the classical Sunni tafsīr known as Tafsir al-Jalalayn, suggests that some of the sūrahs have been named using incipits (i.e. the first few words of the surah). Hamiduddin Farahi a celebrated Islamic scholar of Indian subcontinent is known for his groundbreaking work on the concept of Nazm, or Coherence, in the Quran. He writes that Some sūrahs have been given names after some conspicuous words used in them. The Surah takes its name from its first word al-qariah. This is not only a name but also the title of its subject matter, for the Surah is devoted to the day of Resurrection -Abul A'la Maududi.

== Period of revelation ==
Regarding the timing and contextual background of the supposed revelation (asbāb al-nuzūl), Al-Qāriʻah is a Meccan surah. Meccan suras are chronologically earlier surahs that were revealed to Muhammad at Mecca before the hijrah to Medina in 622 CE. They are typically shorter, with relatively short ayat, and mostly come near the end of the Qur'an's 114 sūwar. Most of the surahs containing muqattaʿat are Meccan. Theodor Nöldeke and William Muir alike assign this surah a place among the earliest revelations of the Qurán -George Sale. In accordance with the western exegesis mentioned, the Muslim tafsirs also exert that the contents of this surah show that this is one of the earliest Surahs to be revealed at Makkah.

== Placement and coherence with other surahs ==
Some Islamic scholars argue that the surahs of the Qur’an follow a deliberate arrangement reflecting thematic coherence. This view is disputed by others, who see the current order as historically derived rather than systematic. In a nutshell, as per this arrangement, the Qur'an is divided in seven distinct groups and the surahs within each group occur in pairs. This pairing of the surahs is on the basis of the topics discussed, and each member of a pair has a complementary relation with one another. Some surahs are an exception to this scheme like Surah Fatihah, which is like an introduction to the whole Qur'an. Some other surahs have come as an appendix or as a conclusion of a group. The idea of textual relation between the verses of a chapter has been discussed under various titles such as nazm and munasabah in non-English literature and coherence, text relations, intertextuality, and unity in English literature. Hamiduddin Farahi, an Islamic scholar of the Indian subcontinent, is known for his work on the concept of nazm, or coherence, in the Quran. Fakhruddin al-Razi (died 1209 CE), Zarkashi (died 1392) and several other classical as well as contemporary Quranic scholars have contributed to the studies.

This surah belongs to the seventh and final group of surahs, which starts from Surah Al-Mulk (67) and runs to the end of the Quran. The theme of the seventh group is to warn the leadership of the Quraysh of the consequences of the Hereafter, to communicate the truth to them to the extent that they are left with no excuse to deny it, and, as a result, to warn them of a severe punishment, and to give glad tidings to Muhammad of the dominance of his religion in the Arabian peninsula. Briefly, this can be stated as delivering warning and glad tidings.

Rhetorically Al-Qariah has 2 similarities with Al-Haaqqa(69). Firstly the opening of the surah resembles Al-Haaqqa (69), which opens with the wordings
69:1 الْحَاقَّةُ
69:2 مَا الْحَاقَّةُ
69:3 وَمَا أَدْرَاكَ مَا الْحَاقَّةُ

notice that Al-Qaria opens in exactly same style
101:1 الْقَارِعَةُ
101:2 مَا الْقَارِعَةُ
101:3 وَمَا أَدْرَاكَ مَا الْقَارِعَةُ

Secondly, word Al-Qaria appears as a total of 5 times in Quran and out of which thrice it is mentioned in this surah while once it appears in Al-Haaqqa as well.

=== Connection with adjacent surahs ===
Al-Qariah form a pair with next surah At-Takathur in regards to their subject-matter. The first surah warns its addressees of the situation that will arise on the Day of Judgement, while the second, with reference to this situation warns them of their attitude of indifference -Javed Ahmed Ghamdi. Regarding its message, this surah forms a group of four similar surahs along with two previous and one next surah which depicts judgement day with picturesque description and concludes the topic of every person's deeds being weighed and thus resulting in either heaven or hell allotted to the according person. -Dr.Israr Ahmed.

== Theme and subject matter ==
The surah focuses on judgement and the afterlife. Its opening verses refer to al-Qāriʿah, often translated as the "Striking Calamity" or the "Great Disaster," and present images associated with the Day of Judgement, including people scattered like moths and mountains compared to carded wool. The later verses describe the weighing of deeds: those whose good deeds are heavy are said to enter a state of satisfaction, while those whose deeds are light are associated with Hāwiyah, described as a blazing fire. George Sale divided the surah into three main sections: verses 1–5, concerning the Day of Judgement; verses 6–9, concerning the judgement of good and bad deeds; and verses 10–11, describing Hāwiyah.
