= Alqamah ibn Waqqas =

Arabian scholar and hadith narrator

'Alqamah ibn Waqqas (Arabic: علقمة بن وقاص) was a scholar and hadith narrator. He narrated hadiths passed on to him from 'Umar, 'Aʾisha, Bilal ibn al-Harith al-Mazani, 'Amr ibn al-'As, Ibn 'Umar and others. People who transmitted his narration included his two sons Amr and Abdullah, Al-Zuhri, and others. He had a house in Madinah and progeny. He died during the reign of 'Abd al-Malik ibn Marwan. His narrated hadiths are found in the Six Books.
