= At-Tin =

95th chapter of the Qur'an

Surah 95 of the Quran
التين At-Tin The Fig
- Qira'ah; English text
- Classification: Meccan
- Other names: The Fig Tree
- Position: Juzʼ 30
- No. of verses: 8
- No. of words: 34
- No. of letters: 162

At-Tin
Recitation of At-Tin in mujawwad.

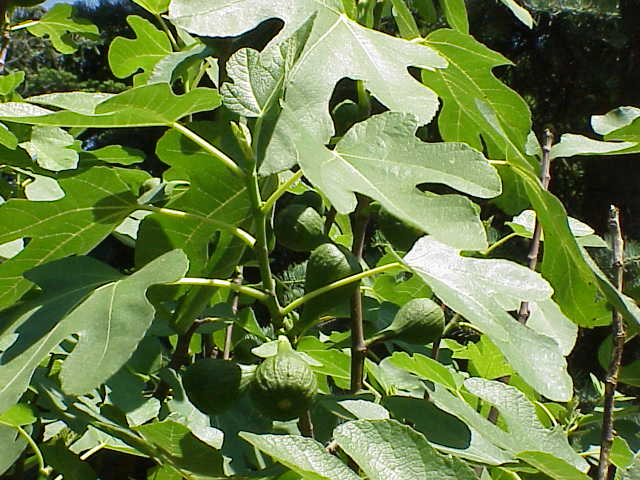
A fruiting Common Fig tree (F. carica)

At-Tīn (Arabic: التين, "The Fig, The Figtree") is the ninety-fifth surah of the Qur'an, with 8 ayat or verses.

== Summary ==
1-4 Oaths that God created man "in the best form"
5-6 God promises believers Paradise and disbelievers Hell
7-8 None may rightly deny the judgment-day

This sura opens by mentioning the fig (the sura's namesake), the olive of Jerusalem, Mount Sinai, and "this city secured" (generally considered to be Mecca).

Muhammad Asad, the author of The Message of The Qur'an comments on these verses:

The "fig" and the "olive" symbolize, in this context, the lands in which these trees predominate: i.e., the countries bordering on the eastern part of the Mediterranean, especially Palestine and Syria. As it was in these lands that most of the Abrahamic prophets mentioned in the Qur'an lived and preached, these two species of tree may be taken as metonyms for the religious teachings voiced by the long line of those God-inspired men, culminating in the person of the last Judaic prophet, Jesus. "Mount Sinai", on the other hand, stresses specifically the apostleship of Moses, inasmuch as the religious law valid before, and up to, the advent of Muhammad—and in its essentials binding on Jesus as well—was revealed to Moses on a mountain of the Sinai Desert. Finally, "this land secure" signifies undoubtedly (as is evident from 2:126) Mecca, where Muhammad, the Last Prophet, was born and received his divine call.

— Muhammad Asad, The Message of The Quran

The cosmology of the Qur'an states that God made mankind out of clay. This sura suggests not only this, but that the mould which God used for man was "the best possible". The lowness of the clay has set humanity apart from God; because clay is heavier and more solid than fire, from which the Jinn were made, and light, from which the angels came.

However, not all humanity is condemned to absolute removal from God's company. The passage continues that "those who believe and do what is right will have a reward that will never be cut off". A human life, when perfected, will thus rise above its modest origins, giving the human condition a unique possibility for glory on the Last Day. God's judgment, for Heaven or Hell, cannot be contradicted, for "Is not God the best of judges?"

== The verses ==
بِسْمِ ٱللَّهِ ٱلرَّحْمَٰنِ ٱلرَّحِيمِ
1. وَٱلتِّينِ وَٱلزَّيْتُونِ
2. وَطُورِ سِينِينَ
3. وَهَٰذَا ٱلْبَلَدِ ٱلْأَمِينِ
4. لَقَدْ خَلَقْنَا ٱلْإِنسَٰنَ فِىٓ أَحْسَنِ تَقْوِيمٍ
5. ثُمَّ رَدَدْنَٰهُ أَسْفَلَ سَٰفِلِينَ
6. إِلَّا ٱلَّذِينَ ءَامَنُوا۟ وَعَمِلُوا۟ ٱلصَّٰلِحَٰتِ فَلَهُمْ أَجْرٌ غَيْرُ مَمْنُونٍ
7. فَمَا يُكَذِّبُكَ بَعْدُ بِٱلدِّينِ
8. أَلَيْسَ ٱللَّهُ بِأَحْكَمِ ٱلْحَٰكِمِينَ

== Explanation ==
The sura starts with three oaths; when the Quran presents an oath, there is a response (jawab) which is related to the oath. That is the central message of the surah. So without understanding the oath and its response, the message of the surah cannot be fully understood. In Classical Arabic, a location would be called by what it was famous for. So fig and olive can refer to two locations. Fig refers to Mount Judi, where Prophet Nuh's Ark landed, while At-Teen referring to Prophet Noah, the location where his Ark ship landed, az-Zaytoon referring to Jesus who was born in Palestine where olives grow or Al-Aqsa in Palestine. These oaths refer to the 2 fruits and also their locations. So the idea that fig and olive refers to both fruit and location was a view of the Sahabah and their early students. According to Ruh al-Ma'ani by Mahmud al-Alusi The intent in naming two fruits is to mention two mountains from the Holy Land of Palestine. Toor refers to a lush, full of trees, green mountain. After Sayna in Sura Al-Mu'minoon, Seeneen is the second version of the name of Mount Sinai which existed in the Hebrew Language among the Scholars. This mountain was not known among the Arabs generally. It is generally believed that Muhammad was illiterate and he did not have any Jewish companions in the Makkan era when this surah was revealed. So without knowing the narrations of Moses or Hebrew language, Muhammad was describing the variations in language of Hebrew linguist scholars. This was a proof of the Quran being divine word of God for the people who had most classified and secret narratives of Moses. "This entrusted city", primarily referring to Mekah, also refers to Muhammad just as Noah, Moses and Jesus were referred by means of mentioning their relative locations in first two ayaat. A contemporary scholar Nouman Ali Khan suggests that it also refers to Abraham as he was the person who established the city Mekah.

Ayah 4 is Jawab-ul-Qasam (Response of the Oath). Quran tells that the Messengers, Noah, Abraham/Ibraheem, Jesus, Moses, and Muhammad, the 'Uluw al 'azam or most persevering of the Prophets, are the best examples for humanity in the perfect (taqweem) form, they are higher examples for humanity in contrast with the animals and low levels that philosophers/psychologists have put forward for mankind. Then We return him to the lowest of the low in Ayah 5 signifies that Allah creates the human in a balance of body and spirit. When there is an imbalance i.e. too much worldly affairs and too little spiritual connection with God – human gets weak/hasty/ungrateful etc. But when there is a balance of spiritual worship to Allah and permissible worldly matters – man gets strong and in the most upright position. Lack of focus on keeping balance causes human to be reduced to the lowest thinking and actions. In the next Ayah the Sura presents the solution of human evilness. Except those who believe (inside actions). And do good deeds. (outside actions) This is just being alluded to, in this surah, but the full explanation is given in surah Al-Asr. Allah will give them a favor of Paradise, and the believers will not credit it to anyone except Allah.

After the oaths, referring to the messengers, letting the reader/listener realize that human being is more higher than other animal species eventually towards the end of the surah, the pondering question is being posed to the audience in penultimate ayah So what yet causes you to deny the Recompense? And then the closing ayah of the Surah is also another question but this one is asked in a critique way that Is not Allah the most just of judges? Allah's Messenger Muhammad would respond to this ayah even in Salah – with the following words

"سبحانك الله و بلا أنا على ذلك من الشهيدين" subhanakAllah wa bal-laa ana 'ala dhalik min ash-shahideen

(Glory be to Allah, and no doubt I am on that from the witnesses).

== Placement and coherence with other surahs ==
The idea of textual relation between the verses of a chapter has been discussed under various titles such as nazm and munasabah in non-English literature and coherence, text relations, intertextuality, and unity in English literature. Hamiduddin Farahi, an Islamic scholar of the Indian subcontinent, is known for his work on the concept of nazm, or coherence, in the Quran. Fakhruddin al-Razi (died 1209 CE), Zarkashi (died 1392) and several other classical as well as contemporary Quranic scholars have contributed to the studies. This surah belongs to the seventh and final group of surahs, which starts from Surah Al-Mulk (67) and runs to the end of the Quran. According to Javed Ahmad Ghamidi

The theme of this group is Warning the leadership of the Quraysh of the consequences of the Hereafter, and delivering glad tidings to Muhammad (sws) of the supremacy of the truth in Arabia. This theme gradually reaches its culmination through the arrangement of various surahs in this group.

Phase	From	To	Central theme
I	Al-Mulk ^{[Quran 67:1]}	Al-Jinn ^{[Quran 72:1]}	Indhar (Warning)
II	Al-Muzzammil ^{[Quran 73:1]}	Al-Inshirah ^{[Quran 94:1]}	Indhar-i 'am (Augmented Warning)
III	At-Tin ^{[Quran 95:1]}	Quraysh (surah) ^{[Quran 106:1]}	Itmam al-Hujjah (Conclusive Communication of the Truth)
IV	Al-Ma'un ^{[Quran 107:1]}	Al-Ikhlas ^{[Quran 112:1]}	Hijrah and Bara'ah (Migration and Acquittal)
V	Al-Falaq ^{[Quran 113:1]}	Al-Nas ^{[Quran 114:1]}	The Conclusion/The End
