= Al-Ma'un =

107th chapter of the Qur'an

Surah 107 of the Quran
ٱلمَاعُون Al-Māʻūn The Acts of Kindness
- Qira'ah; English text
- Classification: Meccan
- Position: Juzʼ 30
- No. of verses: 7
- No. of words: 25
- No. of letters: 114

Al-Ma'un (Arabic: الماعون, al-māʻūn, "Small Kindnesses, Almsgiving, Acts of Kindness, and Have You Seen") is the 107th surah of the Qur'an, with 7 ayat or verses.

۝ Have you seen the one who denies the ˹final˺ Judgment?
۝ That is the one who repulses the orphan,
۝ and does not encourage the feeding of the poor.
۝ So woe to those ˹hypocrites˺ who pray
۝ yet are unmindful of their prayers;
۝ those who ˹only˺ show off,
۝ and refuse to give ˹even the simplest˺ aid.

According to Abul A'la Maududi in his Chapter Introductions to the Quran, Ibn Abbas was cited by differing narrators as to whether it is a Medinan or Meccan surah. According to Maududi, it is more likely for the surah to be Medinan, given that the hypocritical unmindful worshippers addressed (especially in verses 4-6) would not have been seen in Mecca, where Muslims were persecuted for practicing their religion openly. Whereas in Medina, where Muslims held power, such people would be expected.

== Summary ==
- 1-3 Denunciation of those who deny the Quran and oppress the orphan
- 4-7 Hypocrites rebuked for neglect of prayer and charity

== Text and meaning ==
=== Text and transliteration ===
Recitation of Al-Ma'un in mujawwad

- Warsh from Nafiʽ al-Madani

بِسۡمِ اِ۬للَّهِ اِ۬لرَّحۡمَٰنِ اِ۬لرَّحِيمِ ۝
Bismi l-lāhi r-raḥmāni r-raḥīm(i)
أَرَٰٓيۡتَ اَ۬لَّذِے يُكَذِّبُ بِالدِّينِ ۝١
^{1} ’arā’ayta l-ladhī yukadhdhibu biddīn(i)
فَذَٰلِكَ اَ۬لَّذِے يَدُعُّ اَ۬لۡيَتِيمَ ۝٢
^{2} Fadhālika l-adhi yadu‘‘u l-yatīm(a)
وَلَا يَحُضُّ عَلَىٰ طَعَامِ اِ۬لۡمِسۡكِينِ ۝٣
^{3} Walā yaḥuḍḍu ‘alā ṭa‘ami l-miskīn(i)
فَوَيۡلٌ لِّلۡمُصَلِّينَ ۝٤
^{4} Fawaylu l-lilmuṣallīn(a)
اَ۬لَّذِينَ هُمۡ عَن صَلَاتِهِمۡ سَاهُونَ ۝٥
^{5} ’al ladhīna hum ‘an ṣalātihim sāhūn(a)
اَ۬لَّذِينَ هُمۡ يُرَآءُونَ ۝٦
^{6} ’al ladhīna hum yurā’ūn(a)
وَيَمۡنَعُونَ اَ۬لۡمَاعُونَ ۝٧

^{7} Wayamna‘ūna l-mā‘ūn(a)

Translation:Noble Quran, 1999

== Topic ==
This surah is concerned with two of the core teachings of Islam, how one prays and how one gives. The Surah discusses the character of those who claim to be Muslims but are oblivious of the hereafter. These people deprive the orphans of their rights, are heedless to the dues of the destitute, and pray without holding God in remembrance, forgetting the objective behind prayer. Their charitable acts are a display of their false piety, since they do not give for the love of God. The Surah has been so designated after the word al-ma`un occurring at the end of the last verse. Abdullah ibn Masud said: "During the time of the Messenger of God we used to consider ma'un (things of daily use) lending a bucket and cooking-pot."

Ibn Abbas said: "(Those who are neglectful of their prayer) are the ones who delay their prayer."

== Conditions of revelation ==
According to 'Alī ibn Ahmad al-Wāhidī (d. 468/1075), Muqatil and al-Kalbi reported that the sūrah was revealed about Al-'As ibn Wa'il, while Ibn Jurayj reported that the immediate cause of relation was Abu Sufyan ibn Harb's driving an orphan away with a stick.

== Placement and coherence with other surahs ==
The idea of textual relation between the verses of a chapter has been discussed under various titles such as nazm and munasabah in non-English literature and coherence, text relations, intertextuality, and unity in English literature. Hamiduddin Farahi, an Islamic scholar of the Indian subcontinent, is known for his work on the concept of nazm, or coherence, in the Quran. Fakhruddin al-Razi (died 1209 CE), Zarkashi (died 1392) and several other classical as well as contemporary Quranic scholars have contributed to the studies. This surah belongs to the last (7th) group of surahs which starts from Surah Al-Mulk (67) and runs till the end of the Quran. According to Javed Ahmad Ghamidi

The theme of this group is Warning the leadership of the Quraysh of the consequences of the Hereafter, and delivering glad tidings to Muhammad (sws) of the supremacy of the truth in Arabia. This theme gradually reaches its culmination through the arrangement of various surahs in this group.

| Phase | From | To | Central theme |
|---|---|---|---|
| I | Al-Mulk ^{[ 67:1]} | Al-Jinn ^{[ 72:1]} | Indhar (Warning) |
| II | Al-Muzzammil ^{[ 73:1]} | Al-Inshirah ^{[ 94:1]} | Indhar-i ‘am (Augmented Warning) |
| III | At-Tin ^{[ 95:1]} | Quraysh (surah) ^{[ 106:1]} | Itmam al-Hujjah (Conclusive Communication of the Truth) |
| IV | Al-Ma'un ^{[ 107:1]} | Al-Ikhlas ^{[ 112:1]} | Hijrah and Bara’ah (Migration and Acquittal) |
| V | Al-Falaq ^{[ 113:1]} | Al-Nas ^{[ 114:1]} | The Conclusion/The End |

=== Connection with previous surah ===
In the previous pair of sūrahs – Al-Fil and Quraysh (surah) – it is explained that the tribe of Quraysh has been blessed with the favors of peace and sustenance because of the Kaaba. These blessings should have induced them to worship the Lord of this Sacred House with all sincerity and should have striven to fulfill the objective for which it was built and given in their custody. Surah al-Ma‘un is directed at the Quraysh, and its theme is to inform their leadership, of the doom that has been destined for them because of their crimes.

=== Connection with next surah ===
This surah complement the subject-matter of the next surah Al-Kawthar. The first surah presents a charge sheet of the crimes of the leadership of the Quraysh, the characters of the Quraysh chiefs is depicted along with the warning, while the succeeding surah declares their removal from the custodianship of the Kaaba and gives glad tidings to Muhammad.
