= Orphan =

Child who has lost their parents

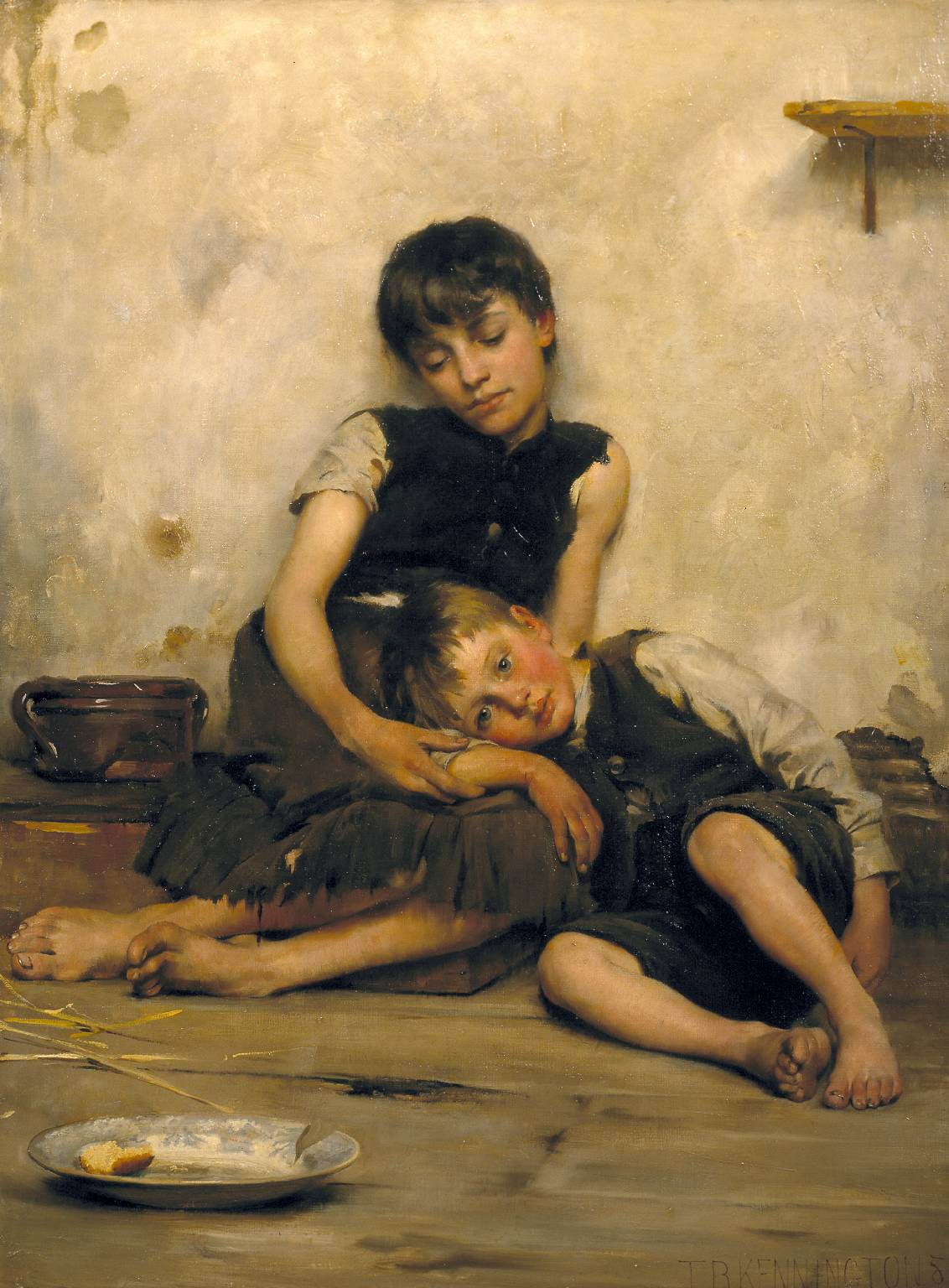
Orphans by Thomas Kennington, oil on canvas, 1885

An orphan is a child whose parents have died, are unknown, or have permanently abandoned them. The Shorter Oxford English Dictionary, 3rd edition, defines the term: "One deprived by death of father or mother, or (usu.) of both; a fatherless or motherless child." In some languages, such as Swedish, the term is "parentless" and more ambiguous about whether the parents are dead, unknown or absconded, but typically refers to a child or younger adult.

In common usage, only a child who has lost both parents due to death is called an orphan. When referring to animals, only the mother's condition is usually relevant (i.e., if the female parent has gone, the offspring is an orphan, regardless of the father's condition).

== Definitions ==
Various groups use different definitions to identify orphans. One legal definition used in the United States is a minor bereft through "death or disappearance of, abandonment or desertion by, or separation or loss from, both parents".

In everyday use, an orphan does not have any surviving parent to care for them. However, the United Nations Children's Fund (UNICEF), Joint United Nations Programme on HIV and AIDS (UNAIDS), and other groups label any child who has lost one parent as an orphan. In this approach, a maternal orphan is a child whose mother has died, a paternal orphan is a child whose father has died, and a double orphan is a child who has lost both parents. This contrasts with the older use of half-orphan to describe children who had lost only one parent.

== History ==
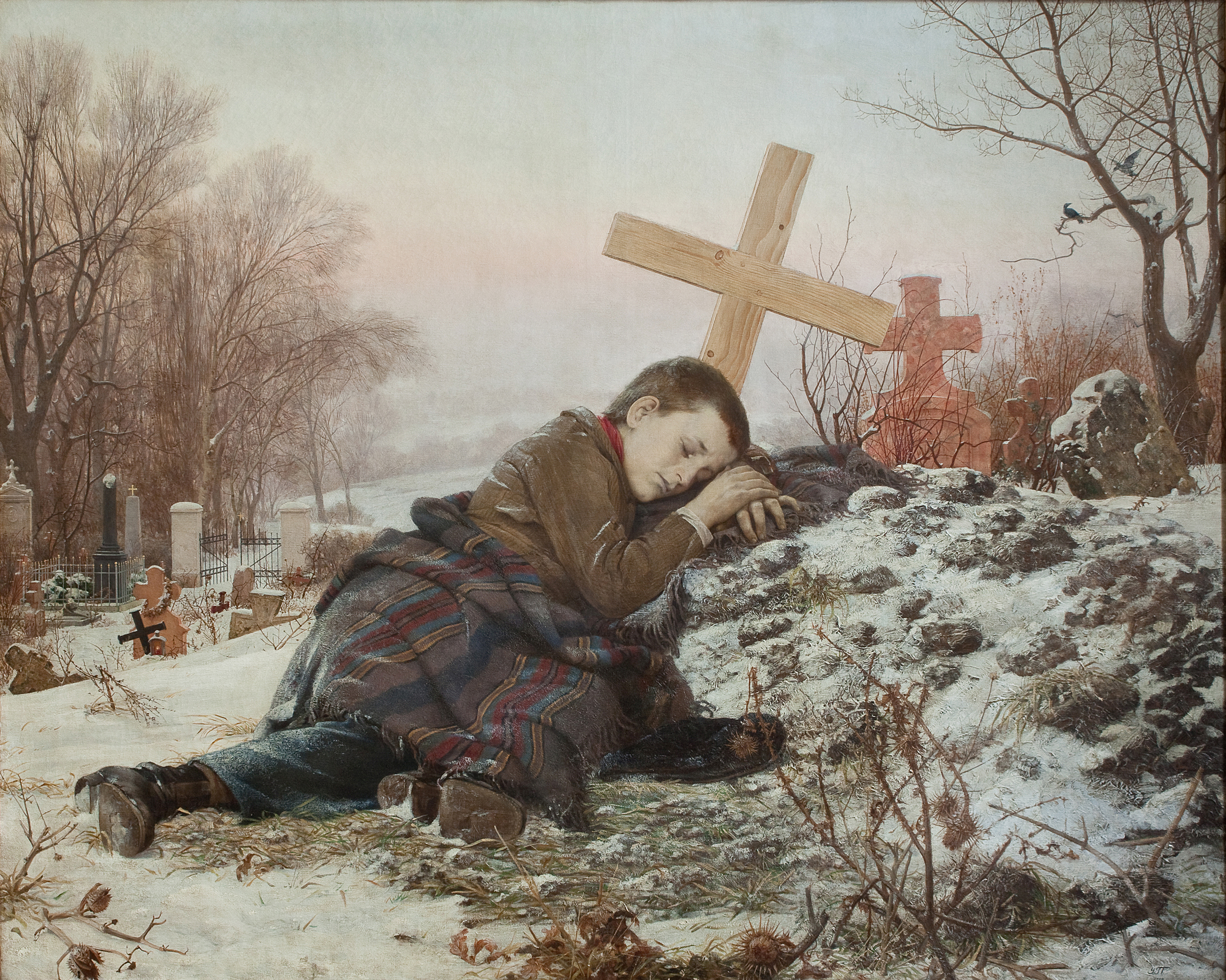
Orphan on mother's grave by Uroš Predić in 1888

Wars, epidemics (such as AIDS), pandemics, and poverty have led to many children becoming orphans. The Second World War (1939–1945), with its massive numbers of deaths and vast population movements, left large numbers of orphans in many countries—with estimates for Europe ranging from 1,000,000 to 13,000,000. Judt (2006) estimates there were 9,000 orphaned children in Czechoslovakia, 60,000 in the Netherlands, 300,000 in Poland and 200,000 in Yugoslavia, plus many more in the Soviet Union, Germany, Italy, China and elsewhere.

== Populations ==
Orphans are relatively rare in developed countries because most children can expect both of their parents to survive their childhood. Much higher numbers of orphans exist in war-torn nations such as Afghanistan.

Continent	Number of orphans (1000s)	Orphans as percentage of all children
Africa	34,294	11.9%
Asia	65,504	6.5%
Latin America & Caribbean	8,166	7.4%
Total	107,964	7.6%

Year	Country	Orphans as % of all children	AIDS orphans as % of orphans	Total orphans	Total orphans (AIDS related)	Maternal (total)	Maternal (AIDS related)	Paternal (total)	Paternal (AIDS related)	Double (total)	Double (AIDS related)
1990	Botswana	5.9	3.0	34,000	1,000	14,000	< 100	23,000	1,000	2,000	< 100
1990	Lesotho	10.6	2.9	73,000	< 100	31,000	< 100	49,000	< 100	8,000	< 100
1990	Malawi	11.8	5.7	524,000	30,000	233,000	11,000	346,000	23,000	55,000	6,000
1990	Uganda	12.2	17.4	1,015,000	177,000	437,000	72,000	700,000	138,000	122,000	44,000
1995	Botswana	8.3	33.7	55,000	18,000	19,000	7,000	37,000	13,000	5,000	3,000
1995	Lesotho	10.3	5.5	77,000	4,000	31,000	1,000	52,000	4,000	7,000	1,000
1995	Malawi	14.2	24.6	664,000	163,000	305,000	78,000	442,000	115,000	83,000	41,000
1995	Uganda	14.9	42.4	1,456,000	617,000	720,000	341,000	1,019,000	450,000	282,000	211,000
2001	Botswana	15.1	70.5	98,000	69,000	69,000	58,000	91,000	69,000	62,000	61,000
2001	Lesotho	17.0	53.5	137,000	73,000	66,000	38,000	108,000	63,000	37,000	32,000
2001	Malawi	17.5	49.9	937,000	468,000	506,000	282,000	624,000	315,000	194,000	159,000
2001	Uganda	14.6	51.1	1,731,000	884,000	902,000	517,000	1,144,000	581,000	315,000	257,000

- 2001 figures from 2002 UNICEF/UNAIDS report
- China: A survey conducted by the Ministry of Civil Affairs in 2005 showed that China has about 573,000 orphans below 18 years old.
- Russia: According to Russian reports from 2002 cited in the New York Times, 650,000 children are housed in orphanages. They are released at age 16, and 40% become homeless, while 30% become criminals or commit suicide.
- Latin America: Street children have a major presence in Latin America; some estimate that there are as many as 40 million street children in Latin America. Although not all street children are orphans, all street children work and many do not have significant family support.
- United States: About 2 million children in the United States (or about 2.7 percent of children) have a deceased mother or father. About 100,000 children have lost both parents.

== Notable orphans ==
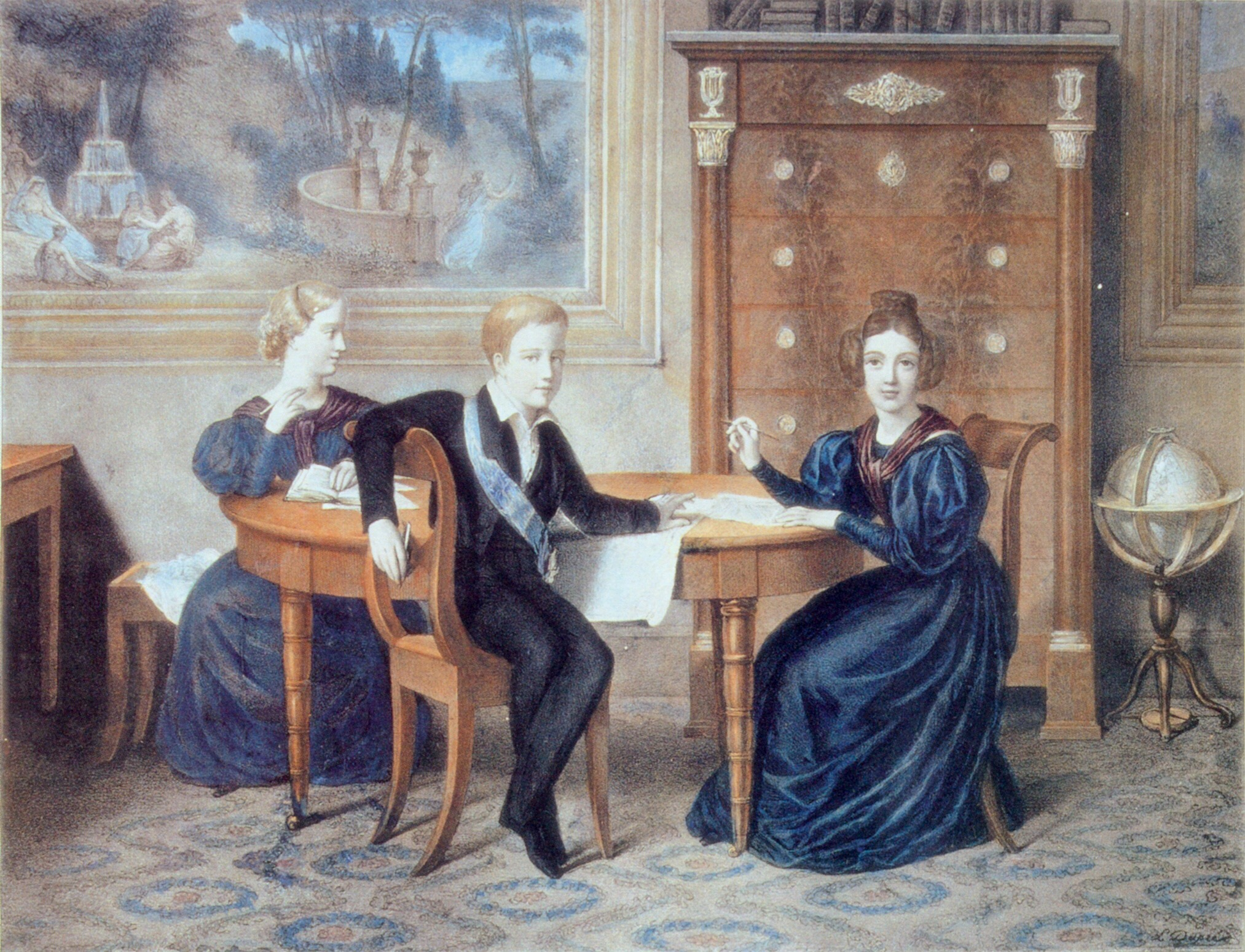
An 1835 portrait by Félix Taunay, depicting Emperor Pedro II of Brazil (aged 9) (Note: While Pedro I died in September 1834 when Pedro II was 8, the young emperor was only informed of his father's death after his 9th birthday on 2 December. This accounts for the age mentioned in the caption.) and his sisters, Princesses Francisca and Januária (aged 10 and 12 respectively), in mourning attire following the death of their father, Pedro I, in late 1834. Having lost their mother, Empress Maria Leopoldina, in 1826, the now-orphaned siblings were raised under the care of appointed tutors and guardians.

Famous orphans include world leaders such as Aaron Burr, Andrew Jackson, and Pedro II of Brazil; writers such as Edgar Allan Poe and Leo Tolstoy; and athletes such as Aaron Hernandez. The American orphan Henry Darger portrayed the horrible conditions of his orphanage in his artwork. Other notable orphans include entertainment greats such as Louis Armstrong, Marilyn Monroe, Babe Ruth, Ray Charles and Frances McDormand.

== In fiction ==
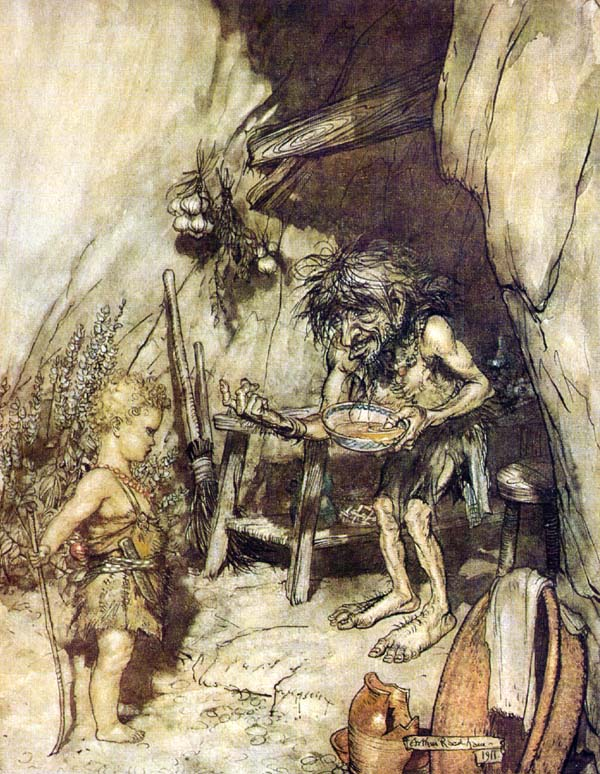
Mime offers food to the young Siegfried, an orphan he is raising; Illustration by Arthur Rackham to Richard Wagner's Siegfried

Orphaned characters are prevalent as literary protagonists, especially in children's and fantasy literature. The lack of parents leaves the characters to pursue more exciting and adventurous lives, by freeing them from familial obligations and controls, and depriving them of more prosaic lives. It creates characters that are self-contained and introspective and who strive for affection. Orphans can metaphorically search for self-understanding by attempting to know their roots. Parents can also be allies and sources of aid for children, and removing the parents makes the character's difficulties more severe. Parents, furthermore, can be irrelevant to the theme a writer is trying to develop, and orphaning the character frees the writer from depicting such an irrelevant relationship; if one parent-child relationship is important, removing the other parent prevents complicating the necessary relationship. All these characteristics make orphans attractive characters for authors.

Orphans are common in fairy tales, such as most variants of Cinderella.

Several well-known authors have written books featuring orphans. Examples from classic literature include Charlotte Brontë's Jane Eyre, Charles Dickens's Oliver Twist, Mark Twain's Tom Sawyer and Huckleberry Finn, L. M. Montgomery's Anne of Green Gables, Thomas Hardy's Jude the Obscure, Victor Hugo's Les Misérables, Edgar Rice Burroughs's Tarzan of the Apes, Rudyard Kipling's The Jungle Book, and J. R. R. Tolkien's The Lord of the Rings.

More recent authors featuring orphan characters include A. J. Cronin, Lemony Snicket, A. F. Coniglio, Roald Dahl and J. K. Rowling. One recurring storyline has been the relationship that the orphan can have with an adult from outside their immediate family, as seen in Lyle Kessler's play Orphans.

=== Other examples ===
Orphans are especially common as characters in comic books. Many popular heroes are orphans, including Superman, Batman, Spider-Man, Robin, Flash, Captain Marvel, Captain America, and Green Arrow. Orphans are also very common among villains: Bane, Catwoman, and Magneto are examples. Lex Luthor, Deadpool, and Carnage can also be included on this list, though they killed one or both of their parents. Supporting characters befriended by the heroes are also often orphans, including the Newsboy Legion and Rick Jones.

Other famous fictional orphans include Little Orphan Annie, Anakin Skywalker, Luke Skywalker and his sister, Leia Organa, and several main characters in children's shows like Diff'rent Strokes and Punky Brewster.

== In religious texts ==
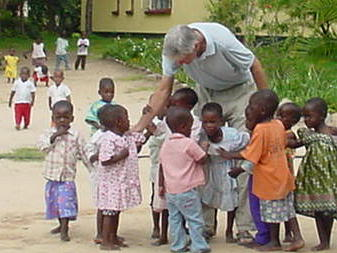
Mother of Peace AIDS orphanage, Zimbabwe (2005)

Many religious texts, including the Bible and the Quran, contain the idea that helping and defending orphans is a fundamental and God-pleasing matter. The religious leaders Moses and Muhammad were orphaned as children. Several scriptural citations describe how orphans should be treated:

Bible

- "Do not take advantage of a widow or an orphan." (Hebrew Bible, Exodus 22:22)
- "Be joyful at your festival—you, your sons and daughters, your male and female servants, and the Levites, the foreigners, the fatherless and the widows who live in your towns".(Hebrew Bible, Book of Deuteronomy 16:14)
- "Leave your orphans; I will protect their lives. Your widows too can trust in me." (Hebrew Bible, Jeremiah 49:11)
- "To judge the fatherless and the oppressed, that the man of the earth may no more oppress." (Hebrew Bible, Psalms 10:18)
- "I will not leave you as orphans; I will come to you." (New Testament, John 14:18)
- "Religion that God our Father accepts as pure and faultless is this: to look after orphans and widows in their distress and to keep oneself from being polluted by the world." (New Testament, James 1:27)

Qu'ran

- "And they feed, for the love of God, the indigent, the orphan, and the captive," - (The Quran, The Human: 8)
- "Therefore, treat not the orphan with harshness," (The Quran, The Morning Hours: 9)
- "Have you not seen those who deny the faith and the Day of Judgment? Those are people who drive orphans away harshly, and do not encourage feeding the indigent. So woe be upon those who do prayer but are neglectful of it or show it off out of vanity, and those who deny even small kindnesses to others." - (The Quran, Small Kindnesses: 1–7)
- "(Be good to) orphans and the very poor. And speak good words to people." (The Quran, The Heifer: 83)
- "...They will ask you about the property of orphans. Say, 'Managing it in their best interests is best'. If you mix your property with theirs, they are your brothers..." (The Quran, The Heifer: 220)
- "Give orphans their property, and do not substitute bad things for good. Do not assimilate their property into your own. Doing that is a serious crime." (The Quran, The Women: 2)
- "Keep a close check on orphans until they reach a marriageable age, then if you perceive that they have sound judgement hand over their property to them..." (The Quran, The Women: 6)

== See also ==
- Adoption
- AIDS orphan
- Child abandonment
- Foster
- History of childhood
  - History of childhood in the United States
- Legitimacy (family law)
- Orphan Train
- Orphanage
- Street children
- Empower Orphans
- Euro-orphan

== Bibliography ==
- Bullen, John. "Orphans, Idiots, Lunatics, and More Idiots: Recent Approaches to the History of Child Welfare in Canada," Histoire Sociale: Social History, May 1985, Vol. 18 Issue 35, pp 133–145
- Harrington, Joel F. "The Unwanted Child: The Fate of Foundlings, Orphans and Juvenile Criminals in Early Modern Germany (2009)
- Keating, Janie. A Child for Keeps: The History of Adoption in England, 1918-45 (2009)
- Miller, Timothy S. The Orphans of Byzantium: Child Welfare in the Christian Empire (2009)
- Safley, Thomas Max. Children of the Laboring Poor: Expectation and Experience Among the Orphans of Early Modern Augsburg (2006)
- Sen, Satadru. "The orphaned colony: Orphanage, child and authority in British India," Indian Economic and Social History Review, Oct-Dec 2007, Vol. 44 Issue 4, pp 463-488
- Terpstra, Nicholas. Abandoned Children of the Italian Renaissance: Orphan Care in Florence and Bologna (2005)
- Rezzutti, Paulo (2019). D. Pedro II: a história não contada: O último imperador do Novo Mundo revelado por cartas e documentos inéditos (in Portuguese). Leya. ISBN 978-85-7734-677-6.
- Barman, Roderick J. (1999). Citizen Emperor: Pedro II and the Making of Brazil, 1825–1891. Stanford, California: Stanford University Press. ISBN 978-0-8047-3510-0.
- Lira, Heitor (1977). História de Dom Pedro II (1825–1891): Ascenção (1825–1870) (in Portuguese). Vol. 1. Belo Horizonte: Itatiaia.
- Schwarcz, Lilia Moritz (1998). As barbas do Imperador: D. Pedro II, um monarca nos trópicos (in Portuguese) (2nd ed.). São Paulo: Companhia das Letras. ISBN 978-85-7164-837-1.

=== United States ===
- Berebitsky, Julie. Like Our Very Own: Adoption and the Changing Culture of Motherhood, 1851-1950 (2000) ISBN 0700610510
- Carp, E. Wayne, ed. Adoption in America: Historical Perspectives (2003) ISBN 0472109995
- Hacsi, Timothy A. A Second Home: Orphan Asylums and Poor Families in America (1997) ISBN 0674796446
- Herman, Ellen. "Kinship by Design: A History of Adoption in the Modern United States (2008) ISBN 978-0-226-32760-0
- Kleinberg, S. J. Widows And Orphans First: The Family Economy And Social Welfare Policy, 1880-1939 (2006) ISBN 0252030206
- Miller, Julie. Abandoned: Foundlings in Nineteenth-Century New York City (2007) ISBN 0814757251
