= Al-Fil =

105th chapter of the Qur'an

Surah 105 of the Quran
ٱلفِيل Al-Fīl The Elephant
- Qira'ah; English text
- Classification: Meccan
- Position: Juzʼ 30
- No. of verses: 5
- No. of Sajdahs: 0
- No. of words: 23
- No. of letters: 96

Al-Fil
Recitation of Al-Fil in mujawwad.

Al-Fīl (Arabic: الفيل, "The Elephant") is the 105th chapter (surah) of the Quran. It is a Meccan sura consisting of 5 verses. The surah is written in the interrogative form.

۝ Have you not seen [O Prophet] how your Lord dealt with the army of the Elephant?
۝ Did he not frustrate their scheme?
۝ For he sent against them flocks of birds,
۝ that pelted them with stones of baked clay;
۝ leaving them like chewed up straw

== Summary ==
- 1-5 The army of Abraha destroyed for attacking the Kaabah.

== Text and meaning ==
=== Text and transliteration ===
- Hafs from Aasim ibn Abi al-Najud

بِسْمِ ٱللَّهِ ٱلرَّحْمَـٰنِ ٱلرَّحِيمِ ۝
Bismi l-lāhi r-raḥmāni r-raḥīm(i)
أَلَمْ تَرَ كَيْفَ فَعَلَ رَبُّكَ بِأَصْحَـٰبِ ٱلْفِيلِ ۝١
¹ ʾalam tara kayfa faʿala rabbuka biʾaṣḥābi l-fīl(i)
أَلَمْ يَجْعَلْ كَيْدَهُمْ فِى تَضْلِيلٍ ۝٢
² ʾalam yajʿal kaydahum fī taḍlīl(in)
وَأَرْسَلَ عَلَيْهِمْ طَيْرًا أَبَابِيلَ ۝٣
³ Waʾarsala ʿalayhim ṭayran ʾabābīl(a)
تَرْمِيهِم بِحِجَارَةٍ مِّن سِجِّيلٍ ۝٤
⁴ Tarmīhim biḥijāratin m-min sijjīl(in)
فَجَعَلَهُمْ كَعَصْفٍ مَّأْكُولٍ ۝٥
⁵ Fajaʿalahum kaʿaṣfin m-maʾkūl(in)

- Warsh from Nafiʽ al-Madani

بِسمِ اِلله الرَّحمَـٰنِ الرَّحِيمِ ۝
Bismi l-lāhi r-raḥmāni r-raḥīm(i)
أَلَم تَرَ كَيفَ فَعَلَ رَبُّكَ بِأَصحَـٰبِ الفِيلِ ۝١
¹ ʾalam tara kayfa faʿala rabbuka biʾaṣḥābi l-fīl(i)
أَلَم يَجعَل كَيدَهُم فِے تَضلِيلٍ ۝٢
² ʾalam yajʿal kaydahum fī taḍlīl(in)
وَأَرسَلَ عَلَيهِم طَيرًا اَبَابِيلَ ۝٣
³ Waʾarsala ʿalayhim ṭayran abābīl(a)
تَرمِيهِم بِحِجَارَةٍ مِّن سِجِّيلٍ ۝٤
⁴ Tarmīhim biḥijāratin mmin sijjīl(in)
فَجَعَلَهُم كَعَصفٍ مَّاكُولٍ ۝٥
⁵ Fajaʿalahum kaʿaṣfin m-makūl(in)

=== Meanings ===
^{1} Have you [O Muhammad] not seen how your Lord dealt with the Owners of the Elephant? [The elephant army which came from Yemen under the command of Abrahah Al-Ashram intending to destroy the Kaaba at Mecca].
^{2} Did He not make their plot go astray?
^{3} And sent against them birds, in flocks,
^{4} Striking them with stones of Sijjil.
^{5} And made them like an empty field of stalks (of which the corn has been eaten up by cattle).

Translation: Noble Quran, 1999

^{1} Have you not considered [O Muhammad] how your Lord dealt with the companions of the elephant?
^{2} Did He not make their plan into misguidance?
^{3} And He sent against them birds in flocks,
^{4} Striking them with stones of hard clay,
^{5} And He made them like eaten straw.

Translation: Saheeh International, 1997

^{1} Seest thou not how thy Lord dealt with the Companions of the Elephant?
^{2} Did He not make their treacherous plan go astray?
^{3} And He sent against them Flights of Birds,
^{4} Striking them with stones of baked clay.
^{5} Then did He make them like an empty field of stalks and straw, (of which the corn) has been eaten up.

Translation: Yusuf Ali, 1934

^{1} Hast thou not seen how thy Lord dealt with the owners of the Elephant?
^{2} Did He not bring their stratagem to naught,
^{3} And send against them swarms of flying creatures,
^{4} Which pelted them with stones of baked clay,
^{5} And made them like green crops devoured (by cattle)?

Translation: Pickthall, 1930

== Asbab al-nuzul ==
Taking its name from the mention of the "Army of the Elephant" in the first verse, this surah alludes to the Abyssinian campaign against Mecca possibly in the year 570 CE. Abraha, the Christian viceroy of Himyar (which at that time was ruled by the Abyssinians), erected the Al-Qalis Church at Sanaa, hoping thus to divert the annual Arabian pilgrimage from the Meccan sanctuary, the Kaaba, to the new church. When this hope remained unfulfilled, he was determined to destroy the Kabah; and so he set out against Mecca at the head of a large army, which included several war elephants as well, and thus represented something hitherto unknown and utterly astounding to the Arabs: hence the designation of that year, by contemporaries as well as historians of later generations, as "the Year of the Elephant". Abraha's army was destroyed on its march - by an extremely huge flock of martin swallow birds (ababil) that dropped tiny stones onto them and turned them to ashes. - and Abrahah himself died on his return to Sanaa.

The Arabs describe the year in which this event took place as the Year of the Elephant, and in the same year, Muhammad was born. The traditionists and historians almost unanimously state that the event of the people of the elephant had occurred in Muharram and Muhammad was born in Rabi' al-awwal. A majority of them states that he took birth 50 days after the event of the elephant.

== Period of revelation ==
Surahs in the Qur'an are not arranged in the chronological order of revelation. Muhammad told his followers the placement in Quranic order of every Wahy revealed along with the original text of the Quran. Wm Theodore de Bary, an East Asian studies expert, describes that "The final process of collection and codification of the Quran text was guided by one over-arching principle: God's words must not in any way be distorted or sullied by human intervention. For this reason, no serious attempt, apparently, was made to edit the numerous revelations, organize them into thematic units, or present them in chronological order ...". Al-Fil is a Meccan sura and Meccan suras are chronologically earlier suras that were revealed to Muhammad at Mecca before the hijrah to Medina in 622 CE. They are typically shorter, with relatively short ayat, and mostly come near the end of the Qur'an's 114 surahs. Most of the surahs containing muqatta'at are Meccan. Henceforth apart from traditions, this surah qualifies to be Meccan typically. Most of the mufassirun say that this is unanimously a Meccan sura; and if it is studied against its historical background it appears that it must have been sent down in the very earliest stage at Makkah.

== Principal subject ==
The principal subject of the surah is a specific historic event. The year of Muhammad's birth is identified as 'the Year of the Elephant', when Mecca was attacked by Abraha accompanied by an elephant. Quranic exegetes interpreted that God saved the Meccans from this force by sending a swarm of birds that pelted the invaders with clay stones and destroyed them. The army of Abraha destroyed for attacking the Kaabah is a reminder and an example that Allah can save His house (Al-Ka'bah) by destroying an army of 60,000 with elephants, through a flock of birds. The origin of the word sijjīl (i.e. Lava stone from Volcanic eruption) in verse 4 has the etymology proposed as Persian sang and gil ('stone' and 'clay'), or Aramaic sgyl ('smooth altar stone'). In the Quran 'sijjīl' occurs in two other verses: 11:82 and 15:74.

== Theme of the surah ==
There are almost 7 divisions in the entire Qur'an according to Themes. The final of these 7 sections starts from surah Al-Mulk [surah number 67] to surah Al-Nas [surah number 114]. This final part [last 7th of the Quran] focuses on; sources of Reflection, People, their final scenes they will face on Judgment Day and Hellfire and Paradise in general and Admonition to the Quraysh about their fate in the Herein and the Hereafter if they deny Muhammad, specifically. In this Surah, God's punishment which was inflicted on the people of the elephant is referred to and described very briefly because it was an event of recent occurrence, and everyone in Makkah and Arabia was fully aware of it. That is why the Arabs believed that the Ka'bah was protected in this invasion, not by any god or goddess, but by God Almighty Himself. Then God alone was invoked by the Quraysh chiefs for help, and for quite a few years the people of Quraysh, having been impressed by this event, had worshiped none but God. Therefore, there was no need to mention the details in Surah Al-Feel, but only a reference to it was enough. Javed Ahmad Ghamidi (b. 1951), a well-known Pakistani Muslim theologian, Quran scholar and exegete, and educationist, explains the theme of Surah Al-Fil is to inform the Quraysh that the God – Who routed His enemies in this manner before them – will also not spare them now that they too have shown enmity to Him. They will also be devastated in a similar manner.

== Coherence with adjacent surahs ==
The idea of textual relation between the verses of a chapter has been discussed under various titles such as nazm and munasabah in non-English literature and coherence, text relations, intertextuality, and unity in English literature. Hamiduddin Farahi, an Islamic scholar of the Indian subcontinent, is known for his work on the concept of nazm, or coherence, in the Quran. Fakhruddin al-Razi (died 1209 CE), Zarkashi (died 1392) and several other classical as well as contemporary Quranic scholars have contributed to the studies.

=== Connection with previous surahs ===
In surahs Al-Qaria (No. 101) to Al-Humaza (No. 104), it is pointed to the Quraysh that they have remained so possessed with the love of wealth and children that they have grossly failed to fulfill the rights of God as well as their fellow beings. Despite this, they still claim to be the heirs of Abraham and Ishmael and the custodians of the Baytullah (House of God) built by them.

=== Connection with next surah ===
This Surah Al-Fil and the next one, Quraysh, form a pair in subject matter according to most Quranic scholars. The former of the pair warns the Quraysh about the Incident of the Elephant to inspire fear in God, while the latter surah urges them to keep in mind the favors they enjoy, because of the Baytullah and consequently to give up rebelliousness against God and worship Him alone. They are cautioned that they have been blessed with peace and sustenance, not because of their efforts or because they were entitled to them, but because of the Prophet Abraham's invocation and the blessings of the House which he built. Therefore, instead of showing vanity, it is their obligation to worship the Lord of this House, who fed them in hunger and secured them against every kind of danger.

== Hadith about Surah Al-Fil ==
- Narrated Al-Muttalib bin 'Abdullah bin Qais bin Makhramah: from his father, from his grandfather, that he said: "I and the Messenger of God, were born in the Year of the Elephant" - he said: "And Uthman ibn Affan asked Qubath bin Ashyam, the brother of Banu Ya'mar bin Laith - 'Are you greater (in age) or the Messenger of God?'" He said: "The Messenger of God is greater than me, but I have an earlier birthday." He said: "And I saw the defecation of the elephant turning green."
- The event took place at Muhassir by the Muhassab valley, between Muzdalifah and Mina. According to the Sahih Muslim and Abu Dawood, in the description of Muhammad's The Farewell Pilgrimage that Imam Ja'far as-Sadiq has related from his father, Imam Muhammad al-Baqir, and he from Jabir ibn Abd-Allah, he says that when Muhammed proceeded from Muzdalifah to Mina, he increased his speed in the valley of Muhassir. Imam Al-Nawawi has explained it saying that the incident of the people of the elephant had occurred there; therefore, the pilgrims have been enjoined to pass by quickly, for Muhassir is a tormented place. Imam Malik in Mu'atta has related that Muhammad said that "the whole of Muzdalifah is a fit place for staying but one should not stay in the valley of Muhassir".
- Narrated by Miswar bin Makhrama and Marwan I (whose narrations attest each other) that: God's Messenger set out at the time of Treaty of Hudaybiyyah ... (at a place) The she-camel of the Prophet (ﷺ) sat down. The people tried their best to cause the she-camel to get up but in vain, so they said, "Al-Qaswa' (i.e. the she-camel's name) has become stubborn! Al-Qaswa' has become stubborn!" The Prophet said, "Al-Qaswa' has not become stubborn, for stubbornness is not her habit, but she was stopped by Him Who stopped the elephant." Then he said, "By the Name of Him in Whose Hands my soul is, if they (i.e. the Quraish infidels) ask me anything which will respect the ordinances of God, I will grant it to them." The Prophet then rebuked the she-camel and she got up. ...
- Narrated Abu Hureyrah that: "When God, the Exalted and Majestic, granted God's Messenger victory over Mecca (Conquest of Mecca), he stood before people and praised and extolled God and then said: Verily God held back the elephants from Mecca and gave the domination of it to His Messenger and believers, and it (this territory) was not violable to anyone before me and it was made violable to me for an hour of a day, and it shall not be violable to anyone after me. So neither molest the game nor weed out thorns from it. And it is not lawful for anyone to pick up a thing dropped but one who makes a public announcement of it. And it a relative of anyone is killed he is entitled to opt for one of two things. Either he should be paid blood-money or he can take life as (a just retribution). ...

== See also ==
- Animals in Islam
- Year of the Elephant
- The Journey (2021 film)
