= Al-Muzzammil =

73rd chapter of the Qur'an

Surah 73 of the Quran
المزمل Al-Muzzammil The Enshrouded One
- Qira'ah; English text
- Classification: Meccan
- Other names: Bundled Up, Cloaked, The Mantled One, The Enwrapped One
- Position: Juzʼ 29
- No. of verses: 20
- No. of Rukus: 2
- No. of words: 200
- No. of letters: 854

Al-Muzzammil (Arabic: المزمل, “The Enshrouded One”, “Bundled Up”, “Enfolded”) is the seventy-third chapter (sūrah) of the Quran, containing 20 verses (āyāt), which are recognized by Muslims as the word of God (Allah). The last Ruku of this surah contains only one ayāt making it possibly the smallest Ruku according to the number of verses or ayāt.

Al-Muzzammil takes its name from the reference to Muhammad, in his cloak praying at night, in the opening verses of the chapter. Many commentators claim that “The Enfolded One” is a name for Muhammad, used throughout the Qur'an.

In the beginning of this surah, God prepares Muhammad for an important revelation. In preparation for this revelation, God loosens the strict regulation on night prayer. Muhammad is then instructed to be patient for the disbelievers who will be punished in Hell, as exemplified by a story of Pharaoh's punishment.

== Summary ==
- 1-3 Muhammad and the Muslims can pray during the night
- 4-9 The Quran to be pronounced with a distinct sonorous tone
- 10-11 Muhammad exhorted to bear patiently the contumelies of the infidels
- 11-14 God will visit the infidels with dire calamities
- 15-19 The punishment of Pharaoh, a warning to the people of Makkah
- 20 Modification of the law given in verses 1-4

== Content ==
In the beginning of Al-Muzzammil (Quran 73), God expounds upon the merits of night prayer in the First Meccan Period. Muhammad, and subsequently the Muslim community, is commanded to “stay up throughout the night, all but a small part of it, half, or a little less, or a little more; recite the Quran slowly and distinctly.” During the First Meccan Period, the total Quranic revelation was brief enough to recite during the night. As such, it was expected of Muslims to recite the Quran in full during the night. The night prayer was of such importance, because the believer's focus on prayer and separation from any distraction was believed to “make a deeper impression” on the believer.

However, as time passed, the Quran continued to grow, and by the time ayat 20 was revealed, the Quran was too long to fully recite during the night. Consequently, God relaxes his prior command to recite the Quran at night. Muhammad is told to pray what is easy for him during the night (“recite as much of the Quran is easy for you”), but to continue to pray throughout the day (“keep up the prayer [during the day], pay the prescribed alms, and lend God a good loan").

== Meccan vs. Medinan Sura ==
Quran 73 is split between Mecca and Medina, with the majority of its ayat being revealed in Mecca (verses 1-19) and its final verse (verse 20) being revealed in Medina. In his famous “Geschichte des korans”, Theodor Nöldeke places this sura in the First Meccan Period, with the exceptions of ayat 10, 11 and 20, which were added at a later time.

There are three major textual suggestions that Q73:20 is Medinan and not Meccan. Firstly, there is a clear discrepancy in the length of ayat 1-19 and verse 20, with the first 19 verses being short and verse 20 being a paragraph in length. This is a trend through the Quran; verses revealed in Mecca are shorter, as Muhammad is more focused on spreading the message of Islam, and the verses revealed in Medina are longer as Muhammad attempts to outline the ideal Muslim society. Secondly, there is a change in how Allah is referenced. In the first 19 ayat, Allah refers to himself mostly as “We” and “your Lord.” In ayat 20, there is a change in voice as Allah begins to refer to himself in the third person, “He”. This grammatical shift is called an iltifat, and is used for rhetorical purposes to arouse the reader's attention. The reference to fighting, further gives credence to it being Medinan. Finally, the Arabic verses 1-19 contain an end rhyme. Verse 20 breaks this end rhyme, suggesting that it was revealed at a different time.

== Placement and coherence with other surahs ==
The idea of textual relation between the verses of a chapter has been discussed under various titles such as nazm and munasabah in non-English literature and coherence, text relations, intertextuality, and unity in English literature. Hamiduddin Farahi, an Islamic scholar of the Indian subcontinent, is known for his work on the concept of nazm, or coherence, in the Quran. Fakhruddin al-Razi (died 1209 CE), Zarkashi (died 1392) and several other classical as well as contemporary Quranic scholars have contributed to the studies. This surah belongs to the last (7th) group of surahs which starts from Surah Al-Mulk (67) and runs till the end of the Quran. According to Javed Ahmad Ghamidi,

The theme of this group is Warning the leadership of the Quraysh of the consequences of the Hereafter, and delivering glad tidings to Muhammad (sws) of the supremacy of the truth in Arabia. This theme gradually reaches its culmination through the arrangement of various surahs in this group.

Phase	From	To	Central theme
I	Al-Mulk ^{[Quran 67:1]}	Al-Jinn ^{[Quran 72:1]}	Indhar (Warning)
II	Al-Muzzammil ^{[Quran 73:1]}	Al-Inshirah ^{[Quran 94:1]}	Indhar-i ‘am (Augmented Warning)
III	At-Tin ^{[Quran 95:1]}	Quraysh (surah) ^{[Quran 106:1]}	Itmam al-Hujjah (Conclusive Communication of the Truth)
IV	Al-Ma'un ^{[Quran 107:1]}	Al-Ikhlas ^{[Quran 112:1]}	Hijrah and Bara’ah (Migration and Acquittal)
V	Al-Falaq ^{[Quran 113:1]}	Al-Nas ^{[Quran 114:1]}	The Conclusion/The End
