= Al-Mulk =

67th chapter of the Quran

Surah 67 of the Quran
الملك Al-Mulk The Dominion
- Qira'ah; English text
- Classification: Meccan
- Other names: 'The Kingdom'
- Position: Juzʼ 29
- No. of verses: 30
- No. of Rukus: 2
- No. of words: 337
- No. of letters: 1316

Al-Mulk
Recitation of Al-Mulk in mujawwad.

Al-Mulk (Arabic: الملك, lit. 'the Sovereignty', 'the Kingdom') is the 67th chapter (surah) of the Quran, comprising 30 verses. Surah Al Mulk emphasizes the greatness of Allah and his creation, urging believers to reflect on the signs of God's power in the universe.

== Summary ==
- 1-3 Praise to the Almighty, Allah, the Creator and Ruler of all things
- 3-5 The perfection of the works of God, seen in the heavens, glorify him
- 5 We have adorned the lowest heaven with lamps and have made them missiles with which to pelt the devils; and We have prepared for them the punishment of the raging fire
- 6-8 Torments of hell prepared for unbelievers
- 8-11 Infidels shall confess in hell their folly in calling Muhammad an impostor
- 12 Verily those who fear their Lord unseen will have forgiveness and a great reward.
- 13-14 God knoweth all things
- 15-18 God shall destroy unbelievers
- 19-24 Unbelievers ungrateful to the God who sustains them in life
- 25-28 They challenged the Prophet to hasten the judgment-day, but they shall dread its approach
- 29-30 The Merciful the only protector on that day
Al-Mulk, 23-24

“He is the One Who brought you into being and gave you hearing, sight, and intellect. ˹Yet˺ you hardly give any thanks.” (67:23)
Allah it is Who multiplied you in the earth and to Him you will be mustered (67:24)

— Al-Qur'an, Juz 29

== Placement and coherence with other surahs ==
The idea of textual relation between the verses of a chapter has been discussed under various titles such as nazm and munasabah in non-English literature and coherence, text relations, intertextuality, and unity in English literature. Hamiduddin Farahi, an Islamic scholar of the Indian subcontinent, is known for his work on the concept of nazm, or coherence, in the Quran. Fakhruddin al-Razi (died 1209 CE), Zarkashi (died 1392) and several other classical as well as contemporary Quranic scholars have contributed to the studies. The entire Qur'an thus emerges as a well-

connected and systematic book. Each division has a distinct theme. Topics within a division are more or less in the order of revelation. Within each division, each member of the pair complements the other in various ways. The seven divisions are as follows:

Group	From	To	Central theme
1	Al-Fatiha ^{[Quran 1:1]}	Al-Ma'ida ^{[Quran 5:1]}	Islamic law
2	Al-An'am ^{[Quran 6:1]}	At-Tawba ^{[Quran 9:1]}	The consequences of denying Muhammad for the polytheists of Mecca
3	Yunus ^{[Quran 10:1]}	An-Nur ^{[Quran 24:1]}	Glad tidings of Muhammad's domination
4	Al-Furqan ^{[Quran 25:1]}	Al-Ahzab ^{[Quran 33:1]}	Arguments on the prophethood of Muhammad and the requirements of faith in him
5	Saba ^{[Quran 34:1]}	Al-Hujraat ^{[Quran 49:1]}	Arguments on monotheism and the requirements of faith in it
6	Qaf ^{[Quran 50:1]}	At-Tahrim ^{[Quran 66:1]}	Arguments on afterlife and the requirements of faith in it
7	Al-Mulk ^{[Quran 67:1]}	An-Nas ^{[Quran 114:1]}	Admonition to the Quraysh about their fate in the Herein and the Hereafter if they deny Muhammad

This surah belongs to the last (7th) group of surahs which starts from Surah Al-Mulk (67) and runs until the end of the Quran. According to Javed Ahmad Ghamidi: "The theme of this group is Warning the leadership of the Quraysh of the consequences of the Hereafter, and delivering glad tidings to Muhammad of the supremacy of the truth in Arabia. This theme gradually reaches its culmination through the arrangement of various surahs in this group."

Phase	From	To	Central theme
I	Al-Mulk ^{[Quran 67:1]}	Al-Jinn ^{[Quran 72:1]}	Indhar (Warning)
II	Al-Muzzammil ^{[Quran 73:1]}	Al-Inshirah ^{[Quran 94:1]}	Indhar-i ‘am (Augmented Warning)
III	At-Tin ^{[Quran 95:1]}	Quraysh (surah) ^{[Quran 106:1]}	Itmam al-Hujjah (Conclusive Communication of the Truth)
IV	Al-Ma'un ^{[Quran 107:1]}	Al-Ikhlas ^{[Quran 112:1]}	Hijrah and Bara’ah (Migration and Acquittal)
V	Al-Falaq ^{[Quran 113:1]}	Al-Nas ^{[Quran 114:1]}	The Conclusion/The End

== Hadith ==
- Imam Ahmad recorded from Abu Hurayrah that Muhammad said,"Verily, there is a chapter in the Quran which contains thirty Ayat that will intercede on behalf of its reciter until he is forgiven. (It is): 'Blessed be He in Whose Hand is the dominion. (Surah Al-Mulk 67)'"
- Muhammad said, 'There is a surah in the Quran which is only thirty verses. It defends whoever recites it until it puts him into Jannah'
- Anas ibn Malik reported Muhammad as saying, "There is a Surah which will plead for its reciter till it causes him to enter paradise."
- Muhammad said, Surah al Mulk is the protector from the torment of the grave'
- Jabir said it was the custom of not to go to sleep until he had read Tabarakalladhi Biyadihil Mulk(Al-Mulk) and Alif Laam Meem Tanzeel (As-Sajda).
- He used to recite Surah As-Sajdah and Surah Al-Mulk (in Arabic) before sleeping.
- Ibn 'Abbas reported that Muhammad said, 'It is my desire/love that Surahtul Mulk should be in the heart of every Muslim'
- Ibn Abbas said that one of Muhammad's companions set up his tent over a grave without realising that it was a grave and it contained a man who was reciting the Surah Tabarakalladhi Biyadihil Mulk up to the end. He went and told Muhammad who said, 'It is The Defender; it is The Protector which safeguards from Allah Ta'ala's Punishment'
- Khalid bin Madam said about surat Al Mulk and As-Sajda that these two surahs will fight for their reciter in the grave and will say, 'O Allah! If we belong to Your book, accept our intercession in his favour. In case we do not, get us obliterated. These surahs will spread their wings like birds and will save the person from the torment of the grave.'
- It was narrated that Abd Allah ibn Mas'ud said: Whoever reads Tabarakalladhi Biyadihil Mulk [i.e. Surah al-Mulk] every night, Allah will protect him from the torment of the grave. At the time of the Messenger of Allah, we used to call it al-mani'ah (that which protects). In the Book of Allah it is a surah which, whoever recites it every night has done very well.
- Abdullah ibn Masud is reported to have said, 'A man will be approached in his grave from his legs and from his chest and then from his head. And each time this Surah will defend him by saying, 'You cannot do anything to him, he used to recite Surah Mulk'.'
- Abdullah ibn Masud further states, 'It is called, 'Al-maani'ah'. For it protects from the punishment of the grave.'
- Ibn Umar said that once that Muhammad recited verse 2 (the One Who created death and life so that He may test you as to which of you is better in deeds) and when he reached the words "better in deeds", he stopped and explained that 'better in deeds' is the person who abstains most from the things Allah has forbidden and is always ready to obey Him."
- Yahya related to me from Malik from Ibn Shihab that Humayd ibn Abd ar-Rahman ibn Awf had told him that Surat al-Ikhlas (Sura 112) was equal to a third of the Quran, and that Surat al-mulk (Sura 67) pleaded for its owner.

Surah Mulk has multiple benefits and Virtues, even it is one of the most beneficial chapters of Qur'an spiritually and theoritically.

== In popular culture ==
Al-Mulk verses 13-26 appearing in Fireman Sam.

In July 2016, it emerged that in the 2014 Fireman Sam episode "Troubled Waters" (Series 9, Episode 6) – in which Elvis slips on a piece of paper and falls into a stack of sheets of paper, causing them to fly everywhere – one of the flying pages that briefly came into view was identified as Al-Mulk, verses 13–26. The production company Mattel apologised for this accident, removed the episode from broadcast, and ceased work with Xing Xing, the animation company responsible for the error. Mattel stated: "Someone from the production company thought they were just putting in random text. We have no reason to believe it was done maliciously." It was at first thought that this episode would have to be removed from broadcast circulation, but instead was censored by having the scene edited to show Elvis just slipping on a blank piece of paper, so the television networks were still able to broadcast it. The BBC received more than 1,000 complaints and forwarded them to Channel 5 as the BBC has not aired Fireman Sam since 2008.
