= Al-Asr =

103rd chapter of the Quran

Surah 103 of the Quran
العصر Al-ʻAṣr The Declining Day
- Qira'ah; English text
- Classification: Meccan
- Other names: Eventide, The Epoch, Time, Afternoon, The Flight of Time, Time through the Ages, Time and Age
- Position: Juzʼ 30
- No. of verses: 3

Al-Aṣr (Arabic: العصر, romanized: al-ʻaṣr, The Declining Day, Eventide, The Epoch, Time) is the 103rd chapter (sūrah) of the Qur’ān, the Muslim holy book. It contains three āyāt or verses. Surat al-‘Aṣr is the third shortest chapter after Al-Kawthar and Al-Naṣr, being shorter than Al-Naṣr by only two words in the 3rd verse.

۝ By the afternoon;
۝ verily man employeth himself in that which will prove of loss:
۝ except those who believe, and do that which is right; and who mutually recommend the truth, and mutually recommend perseverance unto each other.

== Summary ==
- 1-2 Men generally seek for gain and find loss
- 3 The righteous, however, are the exception to this rule

== Text and meaning ==
Al-Asr in mujawwad

=== Text and transliteration ===
Hafs from Aasim ibn Abi al-Najud

بِسْمِ ٱللَّهِ ٱلرَّحْمَٰنِ ٱلرَّحِيمِ ۝
Bismi l-lāhi r-raḥmāni r-raḥīm(i)
وَٱلْعَصْرِ ۝١
¹ Wal‘aṣr(i)
إِنَّ ٱلْإِنسَٰنَ لَفِى خُسْرٍ ۝٢
² ’innal ’insāna lafī khusr(in)
إِلَّا ٱلَّذِينَ ءَامَنُوا۟ وَعَمِلُوا۟ ٱلصَّٰلِحَٰتِ وَتَوَاصَوْا۟ بِٱلْحَقِّ وَتَوَاصَوْا۟ بِٱلصَّبْرِ ۝٣
³ ’il-la l-lzīna ’āmanū wa‘amilu ṣ-ṣāliḥāti watawāṣaw bilḥaq-qi watawāṣaw biṣ-ṣabr(i)

Warsh from Nafiʽ al-Madani

بِسۡمِ اِ۬للَّهِ اِ۬لرَّحۡمَٰنِ اِ۬لرَّحِيمِ ۝
Bismi l-lāhi r-raḥmāni r-raḥīm(i)
وَالۡعَصۡرِ ۝١
¹ Wal‘aṣr(i)
إِنَّ اَ۬لِانسَٰنَ لَفِے خُسۡرٍ ۝٢
² ’in-na linsāna lafī khusr(in)
إِلَّا اَ۬لَّذِينَ ءَامَنُوا۟ وَعَمِلُوا۟ اَ۬لصَّٰلِحَٰتِ وَتَوَاصَوۡا۟ بِالۡحَقِّ وَتَوَاصَوۡا۟ بِالصَّبْرِ ۝٣
³ ’il-la l-lazīna ’āmanū wa‘amilu ṣ-ṣāliḥāti watawāṣaw bilḥaq-qi watawāṣaw biṣ-ṣabr(i)

=== Meaning ===
^{1} By Al-'Asr (the time).
^{2} Verily! Man is in loss,
^{3} Except those who believe (in Islamic Monotheism) and do righteous good deeds, and recommend one another to the truth (i.e. order one another to perform all kinds of good deeds (Al-Ma'ruf) which Allah has ordained, and abstain from all kinds of sins and evil deeds (Al-Munkar) which Allah has forbidden), and recommend one another to patience (for the sufferings, harms, and injuries which one may encounter in Allah's Cause during preaching His religion of Islamic Monotheism or Jihad, etc.).

Translation:Noble Quran, 1999

^{1} By time, (Note: An oath in which Allah swears by time throughout the ages.)
^{2} Indeed, mankind is in loss,
^{3} Except for those who have believed and done righteous deeds and advised each other to truth and advised each other to patience.

Translation:Saheeh International, 1997

^{1} By (the Token of) Time (through the ages),
^{2} Verily Man is in loss,
^{3} Except such as have Faith, and do righteous deeds, and (join together) in the mutual teaching of Truth, and of Patience and Constancy.

Translation:Yusuf Ali, 1934

^{1} By the declining day,
^{2} Lo! man is a state of loss,
^{3} Save those who believe and do good works, and exhort one another to truth and exhort one another to endurance.

Translation:Pickthall, 1930

== Timing and contextual background of revelation ==
Regarding the timing and contextual background of the revelation (asbāb al-nuzūl), it is an earlier "Meccan surah", which means it is believed to have been revealed in Mecca, instead of later in Medina.

According to some, it follows sūrah 94 in the chronological order of the Quran.

== Theme and subject matter ==
This sura teaches that all human beings are in loss, except those who have iman (faith in Islam), do righteous deeds and remind others of the Haqq (truth, rights, reality) and remind others of Sabr (patience).

The text of the Sura can be translated as the following:

1.|وَالْعَصْرِ‌

By time (it explain that God swears By time).

2. إِنَّ الْإِنسَانَ لَفِي خُسْرٍ‌

Indeed man is in loss,

3. إِلَّا الَّذِينَ آمَنُوا وَعَمِلُوا الصَّالِحَاتِ وَتَوَاصَوْا بِالْحَقِّ وَتَوَاصَوْا بِالصَّبْرِ‌‌

except those who have faith and do righteous deeds, and enjoin one another to [follow] the truth, and enjoin one another to patience.

== Importance ==
This sura is considered the summary of whole Quran by almost all notable classical and modern Islamic scholars including Imam Shafi, Ibn Kathir, Israr Ahmed and Farhat Hashmi.

- Ibn Kathir, a traditional exegete, holds that this sura is a warning to believers not to waste time or they could be humiliated or even ruined.
- Imam Shafi, a jurist and traditional scholar of Islam, held that if God had only revealed this surah it would have been sufficient for the guidance of all humankind. It summarized the very essence of the Qur'anic message. Thus, Imam Shafi’i asserts that if one followed its counsel, it was enough for humankind to achieve success in life.
- Sayyid Qutb, a modern exegete of the Qur'an, asserts that this surah outlines a complete system for human life based on an Islamic viewpoint. He says that it defines, in the clearest and most concise form, the basic concept of faith in the context of its comprehensive reality. He further says that he is gravely shocked to see the loss and ruin in which humanity finds itself. He is critical of Muslims and non-Muslims and particularly witnessing that humankind is turning away from the goodness that God has bestowed upon it. He is confident that the guidance of this surah is what made the early Muslim great as it can do for those that follow it in the long history of humanity. He says that once the early Arabs were aroused by such surahs, they quickly burst the bounds of Arabia and zealously worked toward the salvation of humanity.
- Al-Tabarani: when humankind finds itself at a loss; it can revive itself by returning to the formula provided by the third verse and the four principles/conditions, which are adhered to as a foundation. We saw how these four principles operated on both physical and spiritual levels. This is probably the reason why the companions of the Prophet did not want to become heedless of the foundational message of Islam. Consequently, they used to meet one another and only depart until one of them recited surat-Al-Asr to the other and they bid peace upon one another.
