= Essam Amanallah Bukhary =

- عصام أمان الله بخاري

Chief Executive Officer of Manga Productions
- In office Mar, 2017 – now

Personal details
- Born: 1978 (age 47–48) Taif, Saudi Arabia

Essam Amanallah Bukhary (Arabic: عصام أمان الله بخاري; born 1978 in Ta’if, Saudi Arabia) is a Saudi writer, researcher, and executive specializing in technology management and innovation. He is the chief executive officer of Manga Productions, a subsidiary of the Mohammed bin Salman Foundation (Misk). From 2008 to 2015, he served as the Saudi cultural attaché in Japan. He also writes a weekly column titled "Astrolabe" in the Al Riyadh newspaper.

== Career ==
- Chief Executive Officer of Manga Productions (Misk Foundation).
- Saudi cultural attaché in Japan (2008–2015).
- Editor-in-Chief of Manga Arabia.
- Former managing director of Arenat, a subsidiary of the Saudi Research and Media Group.
- Faculty member at King Abdulaziz University in Jeddah.
- Board member of the General Culture Authority (appointed in 2018).
