= Q67 =

Q67 may refer to:

- Q67 (New York City bus)
- Al-Mulk, a surah of the Quran
- French submarine Monge (Q67)
