= Manga Productions =

Saudi Arabian entertainment company

- Native name: مانجا للإنتاج
- Industry: Animation • Comics • Video games
- Founded: September 10, 2017; 9 years ago
- Founder: Misk Foundation
- Headquarters: Riyadh, Saudi Arabia
- Number of locations: Tokyo, Japan
- Key people: Essam Amanallah Bukhary (CEO)
- Owner: Misk Foundation

Manga Productions (Arabic: مانجا للإنتاج) is a Saudi Arabian animation and creative content company headquartered in Riyadh, Saudi Arabia. Founded in 2017, it is a subsidiary of Misk Foundation. The company produces animated films and series, as well as video games and comic books. In 2019, it opened an office in Tokyo, Japan.

== Business activities ==
=== Animation ===
Manga Productions creates original animated works, often in partnership with leading Japanese studios such as Toei Animation.

- In 2020, the company co-produced the television series Asateer: Future's Folktales, which aired across the Arab world, the United States, and Japan, and surpassed 100 million streams on over 40 platforms.
- Its sequel, Asateer2: Future's Folktales, premiered in November 2024 on MBC1 in Saudi Arabia and TV Tokyo in Japan.
- In 2021, Manga Productions and Toei Animation released the feature film The Journey, which was distributed across the Middle East, Japan, the United States, and Europe. The film became the first Middle Eastern production to win the Experimental Category Award at the Septimius Awards in Amsterdam.

=== Video games ===
The company develops and publishes both mobile and console games. In September 2024, it released Future's Folktales: Hopper Quest, a free-to-play mobile game based on its animated series. Manga Productions also handles localization and distribution of international titles across the Middle East and North Africa, including Dynasty Warriors: Origins (2024) and Nioh 3 (2025).

=== Comics ===
Manga Productions has published a number of comic titles, including Bissa, and Mercury Girl, a fantasy adventure series serialized since 2023.

=== Intellectual property management ===
Manga Productions is active in licensing, localization, and distribution of Japanese intellectual properties across the Arab world.

- In 2022, it signed a partnership with Dynamic Planning Corporation to manage the Grendizer franchise in the Middle East.
- In November 2022, it unveiled a 33.7-meter statue of Grendizer in Riyadh, recognized by Guinness World Records as the world's largest metal sculpture of a fictional character.
- In 2023, Manga Productions acquired global distribution rights for Grendizer U from Dynamic Planning. The Arabic-dubbed version premiered in Saudi Arabia on July 5, 2024, simultaneously with its Japanese release.
- The company also managed regional distribution of Captain Tsubasa Season 2: Junior Youth (2023) and partnered with TSUBASA Corporation as the official uniform sponsor of Nankatsu SC, a Tokyo-based football club tied to the famous manga series.

== Television ==
| No. | Title | Series director | Broadcast network(s) | Episodes | Year(s) | Notes | Ref(s) |
|---|---|---|---|---|---|---|---|
| 1 | Future's Folktales | Masami Shimoda | MBC | 13 | Jan 24, 2020 – Apr 17, 2020 | Co-produced with Toei Animation | |
| 2 | Future's Folktales – Season 2 | Masami Shimoda | MBC | 13 | Nov 3, 2024 – Jan 24, 2025 | Co-produced with Toei Animation | |

== Films ==
=== Theatrical films ===
| Title | Director(s) | Release date | Note(s) | Ref(s) |
|---|---|---|---|---|
| The Journey | Kōbun Shizuno | June 17, 2021 | Co-produced with Toei Animation. | |

== See also ==
- Misk Foundation
