= Ad-Dhuha =

93rd chapter of the Qur'an

Surah 93 of the Quran
الضحى Aḍ-Ḍuḥā The Morning Hours
- Qira'ah; English text
- Classification: Meccan
- Other names: Morning Bright, The Early Hours, The Forenoon, The Bright Morning Hours, Daylight
- Position: Juzʼ 30
- No. of verses: 11
- No. of words: 40
- No. of letters: 165

Ad-Dhuha
Recitation of Ad-Dhuha in mujawwad.

Ad-Ḍuḥā (Arabic: الضحى, "The Morning Hours", "Morning Bright", "The Early Hours") is the ninety-third chapter (surah) of the Qur'an, with 11 āyat or verses. Qur'an 93 takes its name from Arabic its opening word, al-ḍuḥā, "the morning".

The chapter begins with oaths. It is often coupled with sura al-Inshirah, sometimes without the basmala between them.

It should be taken into consideration that according to many narrations, it is said that surah Ad -Dhuha and surah Al-Inshirah are one surah and should be recited in prayers (salah) together. One can also see the close relation between the subject matter of both the surahs.

== Summary ==
- 1-3 Muhammad comforted by the assurance that God is with him
- 4-5 The life to come to be preferred to the present life
- 6-11 Muhammad exhorted to care for the orphan and beggar

== See also ==
- Salah (prayer)
- Zuhr (mid-day prayer)
