= The Journey (2021 film) =

2021 film by Kōbun Shizuno

- Arabic: الرحلة
- Japanese: ジャーニー 太古アラビア半島での奇跡と戦いの物語
- Literal meaning: Journey: The Story of Miracles and Battles on the Ancient Arabian Peninsula
- Revised Hepburn: Jānī Taiko Arabia Hantō de no Kiseki to Tatakai no Monogatari
- Directed by: Kōbun Shizuno
- Screenplay by: Atsuhiro Tomioka
- Story by: Peter Cooper; Essam Bukhary; Amr Almaddah
- Produced by: Nao Hirasawa
- Starring: Tōru Furuya; Kotono Mitsuishi; Hiroshi Kamiya; Yuichi Nakamura; Kazuya Nakai; Takaya Kuroda
- Cinematography: Takeo Ogiwara; Yo Izumitsui
- Edited by: Masao Yoshitake
- Music by: Kaoru Wada
- Production companies: Toei Animation; Yokohama Animation Laboratory; Manga Productions
- Distributed by: Toei Animation (Japan) (Note: Distribution assistance by Toei Company); VOX Cinemas (Saudi Arabia)
- Release dates: June 17, 2021 (Saudi Arabia); June 25, 2021 (Japan)
- Running time: 110 minutes
- Countries: Japan; Saudi Arabia
- Languages: Japanese; Arabic
- Budget: $7 million
- Box office: $1,500,000

The Journey (Note: (Arabic: الرحلة, romanized: ar-Riḥla, Japanese: ジャーニー 太古アラビア半島での奇跡と戦いの物語, romanized: Jānī – Taiko Arabia Hantō de no Kiseki to Tatakai no Monogatari, lit. 'Journey: The Story of Miracles and Battles of the Ancient Arabian Peninsula')) is a 2021 Saudi Arabian–Japanese animated action film directed by Kōbun Shizuno, written by Atsuhiro Tomioka and co-produced by Toei Animation and Manga Productions. The film, based on the Islamic historical event, the Year of the Elephant, revolves around a potter named Aus who joins a battle to defend his home city of Mecca. The film stars the voices of Tōru Furuya, Kotono Mitsuishi, Hiroshi Kamiya, Yuichi Nakamura, Kazuya Nakai, and Takaya Kuroda. The film was released in Japan, the Middle East and North Africa in June 2021.

== Premise ==
"As a ruthless invader threatens to enslave their people and destroy the Kaaba, a sacred sanctuary, the people of Mecca take up arms. Only able to muster a small force against the massive army, defeat seems all but inevitable. Aus, a seemingly simple potter fighting to protect his family, is forced to reveal his dark past when he discovers amongst the defenders a long-lost friend believed to be dead - a warrior named Zurara. As fear threatens to break their resolve, Aus' strength of faith compels him to stand and fight. Aus battles his own doubts and fears as he tries to unite his friends and compatriots on the eve of battle. Abraha's army is fast approaching, and the fate of Mecca and its people hangs in the balance. Will the people of Mecca defeat the colossal army with nothing but their simple defenses and their love for their city?"

== Voice cast ==
=== Japanese voice cast ===
- Tōru Furuya as Aus
- Kotono Mitsuishi as Hind
- Hiroshi Kamiya as Zurara
- Kazuya Nakai as Musab
- Takaya Kuroda as Abraha
- Yuichi Nakamura as Nizar
- Mugihito as Muttalib

=== Arabic voice cast ===
- Nassar Al-Nassar as Aus
- Rasha Rizk as Hind
- Abdullah Elfiky as Zurara
- Ahmed Al-Yazidi as Musab
- Abdo Chahine as Abraha
- Abdul Rahman Al-Warthan as Nizar
- Jassim Al-Nabhan as Muttalib

=== English voice cast ===
- Johnny Yong Bosch
- Jennie Kwan
- Bryce Papenbrook
- Alejandro Saab
- Christopher Sabat
- Steve Blum
- Hesham Elshazly
- Cedric Williams
- Hussein Mohammed

== Production ==
The film is a joint collaboration which began in November 2017 between Manga Productions and Toei Animation. It is the second animated work made by Manga in collaboration with Toei; with the first being animated series Future's Folktales. The Journey was directed by Kōbun Shizuno with Atsuhiro Tomioka providing the screenplay. The character designs were done by Tatsuro Iwamoto and musical score by Kaoru Wada. Production work for The Journey was done both in Tokyo and Riyadh. The film project's cost ranges from $10–15 million, with production finished by February 2020.

== Release ==
The Journey was originally planned to make its premiere in 2020 at the Cannes Film Festival which was cancelled due to the COVID-19 pandemic. The film was released in the Middle East and North Africa theaters on June 17, 2021. VOX Cinemas has theatrical rights for the film in the Middle East and North Africa region. The film is released in Arabic and Japanese with English Subtitles.

Toei subsidiary T-Joy had the distribution rights for the film in Japan, and later distributed by Toei Animation. The film was released in Japanese theaters on June 25, 2021.

Crunchyroll started to stream the film for North and South America, Asia and Europe on September 2, 2022.

== Reception ==
The Journey grossed $1,500,000 at the box office.
