= Mosque of the Jinn =

Mosque in Makkah, Saudi Arabia

- Arabic: مسجد الجن
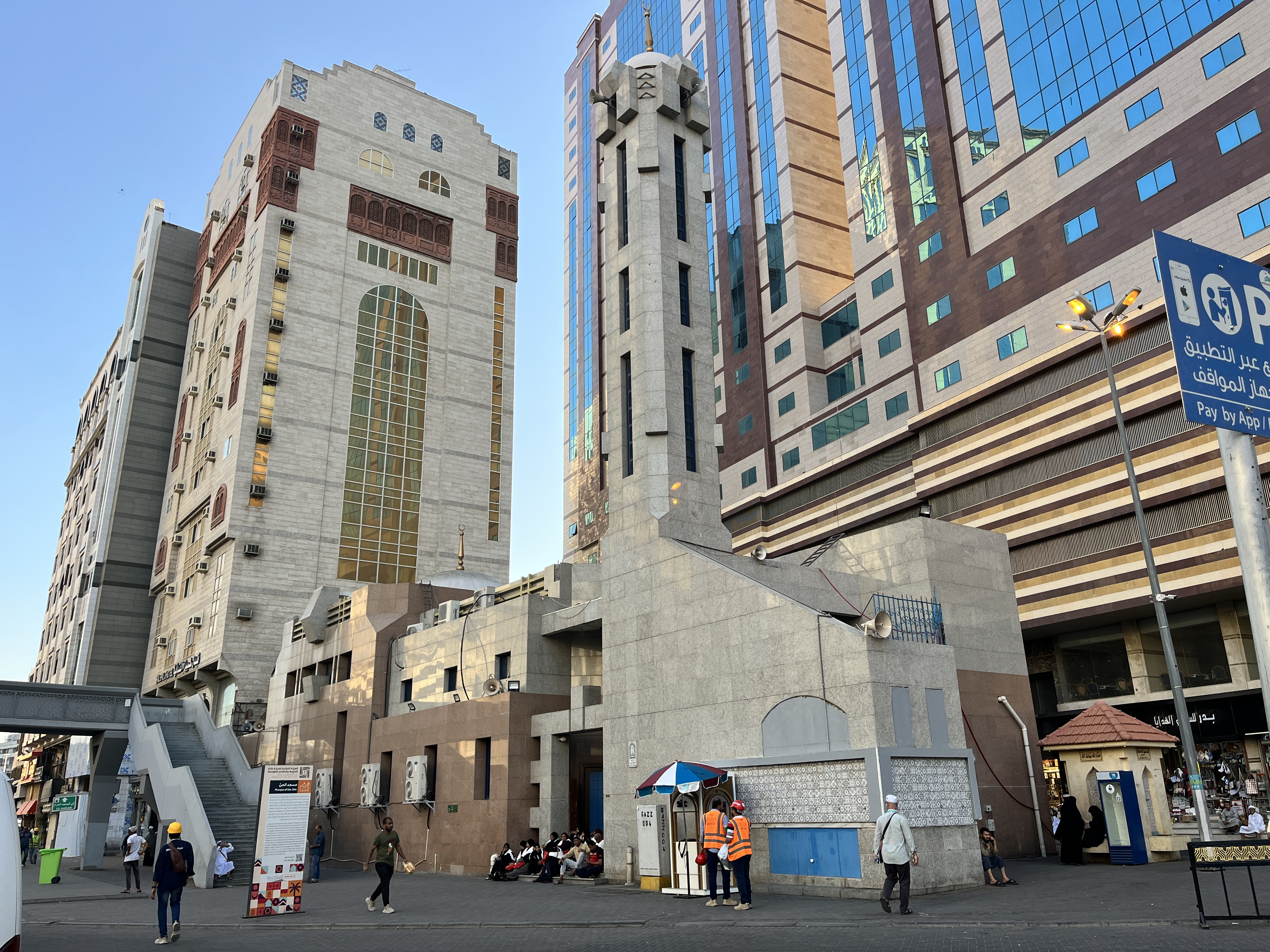
- The mosque in 2020

- Location within Saudi Arabia

Religion
- Affiliation: Sunni Islam
- Ecclesiastical or organisational status: Mosque
- Status: Active

Location
- Location: Makkah
- Country: Saudi Arabia
- Coordinates: 21°26′00.2″N 39°49′44.2″E

Architecture
- Type: Mosque architecture
- Minaret: One

The Mosque of the Jinn (Arabic: مسجد الجنّ, romanized: Masjid al-Jinn) is a Sunni Islam mosque, located in Mecca, Saudi Arabia, near Jannat al-Mu'alla. It is also known as the Mosque of Allegiance (Arabic: مسجد بِيعات, romanized: Masjid Biy‘āt) and the Mosque of Guards (Arabic: مسجد الحرس, romanized: Masjid al-Ḥaras) because the city's guards would patrol up to that point.

The mosque is built at the place where a group of jinn are said to have gathered one night to hear the recitation of a portion of the Quran by Muhammad. Muhammad later met there with these jinn's leaders and accepted their embrace of Islam and their bay'ah (oath of allegiance) to him. The incident is mentioned in chapter al-Jinn of the Quran.

The mosque is considered one of the oldest in Mecca and is one of the most important mosques visited in the city.

== See also ==
- Islam in Saudi Arabia
- List of mosques in Saudi Arabia
