= Year of the Elephant =

Year when Muhammad was born, 570–571 CE

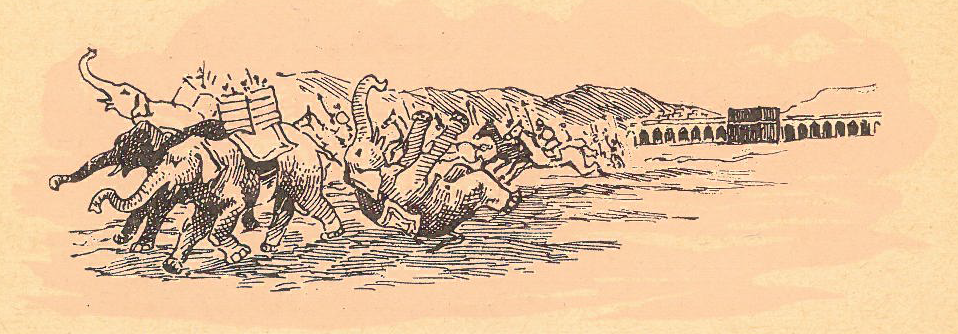
Abyssinian rout at Mecca in the Year of the Elephant, as depicted in Tareekh Al-Islam Al-Musawwar (1964)

The ʿām al-fīl (Arabic: عام الفيل, Year of the Elephant) is the name in Islamic history for the year approximately equating to 570–571 CE. According to Islamic literary sources, it was in this year that the Islamic prophet Muhammad was born. The name is derived from an event said to have occurred at Mecca: Abraha, the Abyssinian Christian king of Himyar marched upon the Ka‘bah in Mecca with a large army, which included war elephants, intending to demolish it. However, the lead elephant, known as 'Mahmud' (Arabic: مَـحْـمُـوْد), is said to have stopped at the boundary around Mecca, and refused to enter. It has been mentioned in the Quran that the army was destroyed by small birds, sent by Allah, that carried pebbles that destroyed the entire army and Abraha perished. Surah Fil in the Quran contains an account of the event. The year came to be known as the Year of the Elephant, beginning a trend for reckoning the years in the Arabian Peninsula. This reckoning was used until it was replaced with the Islamic calendar during the times of ‘Umar.

Archaeological discoveries in Southern Arabia suggest that Year of the Elephant may have been 569 or 568, as the Sasanian Empire overthrew the Aksumite-affiliated rulers in Yemen around 570.

The year is also recorded as that of the birth of ‘Ammar ibn Yasir.

== Events ==
Siege of Mecca
Date	c. 570
Location	Wadi Muhassar (outskirts of Mecca)
Result	Quraysh victory: Abraha fails to reach the Kaaba; Abraha's army is destroyed; Abraha is badly wounded and dies while retreating to Sanaa

Belligerents
Quraysh	Kingdom of Aksum; Himyarites

Commanders and leaders
Abd al-Muttalib	Abraha

According to early Islamic historians such as Ibn Ishaq, in honor of his ally, Abraha built a great church at Sanaa known as Al-Qalis, a loanword borrowed from εκκλησία "church".

Al-Qullays gained widespread fame, even gaining the notice of the Byzantine Empire. Other Arab people of the time had their own center of religious worship and pilgrimage in Mecca, the Kaaba. Abraha attempted to divert their pilgrimage to al-Qullays and appointed a man named Muhammad ibn Khuza'i to Mecca and Tihamah as a king with a message that al-Qullays was both much better than other houses of worship and purer, having not been defiled by the housing of idols.

Ibn Ishaq's Prophetic biography states:

With Abraha there were some Arabs who had come to seek his bounty, among them Muhammad ibn Khuza`i ibn Khuzaba al-Dhakwani, al-Sulami, with a number of his tribesmen including a brother of his called Qays. While they were with him a feast of Abraha occurred and he sent to invite them to the feast. Now he used to eat an animal's testicles, so when the invitation was brought they said, "By God, if we eat this the Arabs will hold it against us as long as we live."

Thereupon Muhammad ibn Khuza'i got up and went to Abraha and said, "O King, this is a festival of ours in which we eat only the loins and shoulders." Abraha replied that he would send them what they liked because his sole purpose in inviting them was to show that he honored them.

Then he crowned Muhammad ibn Khuza'i, and made him emir of Mudhar, and ordered him to go among the people to invite them to pilgrimage at his cathedral which he had built. When Muhammad ibn Khuza'i got as far as the land of Kinana, the people of the lowland, knowing what he had come for, sent a man of Hudhayl called ʿUrwa bin Hayyad al-Milasi, who shot him with an arrow, killing him. His brother Qays who was with him fled to Abraha and told him the news, which increased his rage and fury and he swore to raid the Kinana tribe and destroy the temple.

Abraha, incensed, launched an expedition of sixty thousand men against the Ka‘bah at Mecca, led by a white elephant named Mahmud (and possibly with other elephants - some accounts state there were several elephants, or even as many as eight) in order to destroy the Ka‘bah. Several Arab tribes attempted to fight him on the way, but were defeated.

When news of the advance of Abraha's army came, the Arab tribes of the Quraysh, Banu Kinanah, Banu Khuza'a and Banu Hudhayl united in defense of the Ka‘bah. However, this coalition was plagued by infighting and rival interests, with many other various tribes instead choosing to ally and submit with the intent of undermining their competitors. A man from the Himyarite Kingdom was sent by Abraha to advise them that Abraha only wished to demolish the Kaaba and if they resisted, they would be crushed. ‘Abdul Muttalib, the grandfather of Muhammad, told the Meccans to seek refuge in the hills while he with some leading members of the Quraysh remained within the precincts of the Ka‘bah. Abraha sent a dispatch inviting Abdul-Muttalib to meet with Abraha and discuss matters. When Abdul-Muttalib left the meeting he was heard saying, "The Owner of this House is its Defender, and I am sure He will save it from the attack of the adversaries and will not dishonor the servants of His House."

The reference to the story in Qur’an is rather short. According to Surah al-Fil, the next day [as Abraha prepared to enter the city], a dark cloud of small birds named 'Ababil' (Arabic: أَبـابـيـل) appeared. The birds carried small rocks in their beaks, and bombarded the Ethiopian forces and smashed them like "eaten straw". However according to Muhammad Asad this surah does not describe birds literally carrying small rocks, he instead, referencing Al-Zamakhshari and Fakhr al-Din al-Razi translates the above mentioned verses as:

(2)Thus, He let loose upon them great swarms of flying creatures (3) which smote them with stone-hard blows of chastisement pre-ordained

== Unorthodox views ==
According to Mohammad Asad, the words used in this verse, namely the "stones of sijjil", denote "a writing and, tropically, something that has been decreed [by God]". He further explains that this decree by God was a very sudden epidemic outbreak, which, according to Ibn Ishaq, caused fever (in arabic hasbah) and smallpox (arab. judari). This, as Asad concludes, points to the fact that the "stone hard blows of chastisement pre-ordained" were a very sudden virulent epidemic due to the fact that the word for fever "hasbah" primarily means "pelting [or smiting] with stones" in the famous arabic dictionary al-Qamous (القاموس) by Fairuzabadi. The word ta'ir can denote any "flying creature, whether bird or insect (Taj al-'Arus)". However, some scholars like Neal Robinson disagree with Asad method of translation and interpretation.

== Other sources ==
This event is referred to in the Qur’an, in Surah 105, Al-Fil (Arabic: الـفِـيـل, "The Elephant"), and is discussed in its related tafsir.

Some others have placed the Year of the Elephant one or two decades earlier than 570 CE, with a tradition attributed to Ibn Shihab al-Zuhri in the works of ‘Abd al-Razzaq al-San‘ani placing it before the birth of Muhammad's father.

== See also ==
- War elephant
- The Journey (2021 film) - Japanese-Saudi Arabian anime film based on the incident.
- Cultural depictions of elephants
