= Mohammed Bin Salman Nonprofit City =

Planned district in northwestern Riyadh, Saudi Arabia

Misk City مدينة مسك
- District
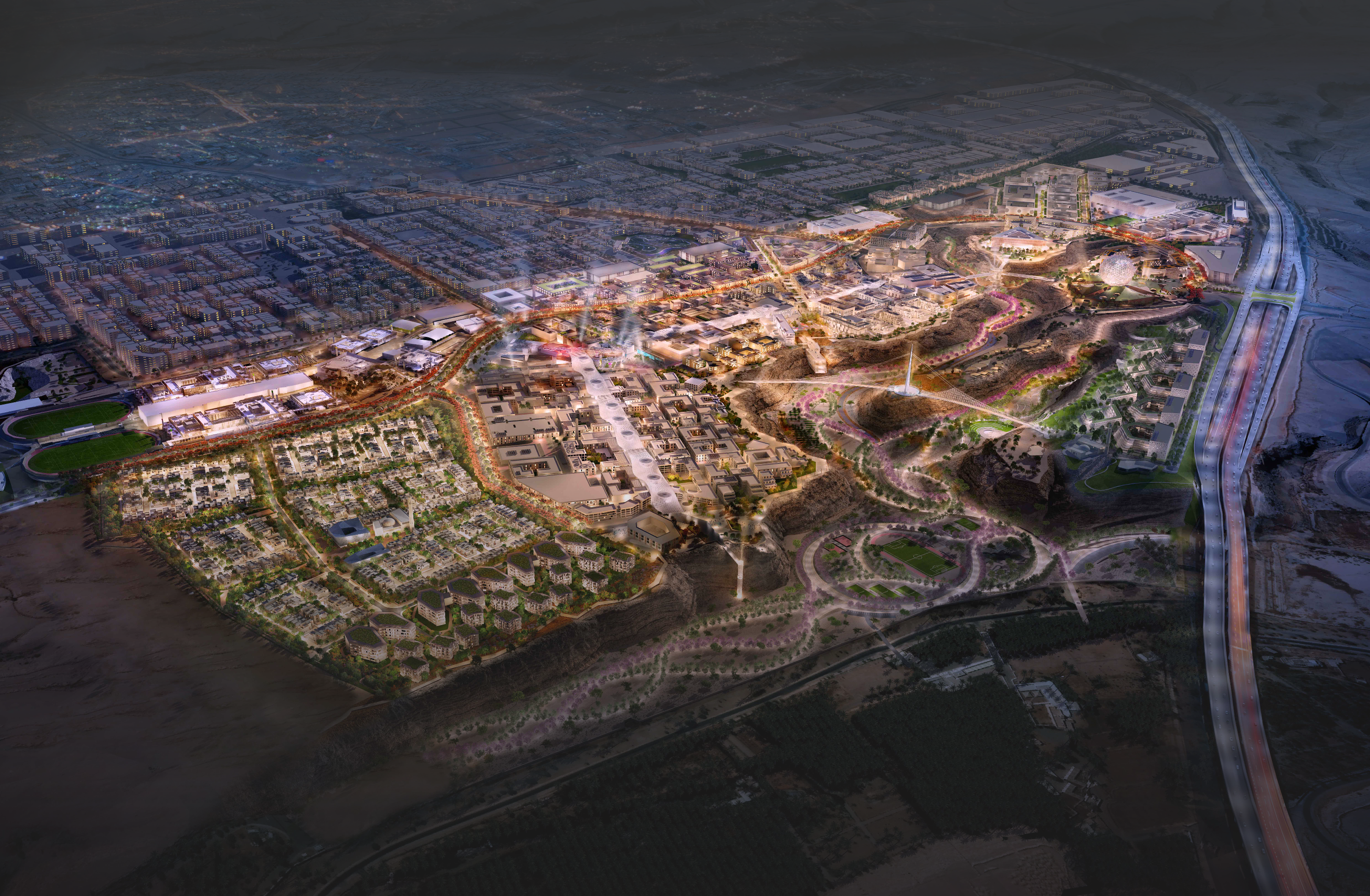
- Render of the city

- Location within Saudi Arabia Location within Asia
- Coordinates: 24.6984°N 46.58593°E
- Country: Saudi Arabia
- Province: Riyadh Province
- City: Riyadh
- Established: 14 November 2021; 4 years ago
- Founder: Mohammed bin Salman
- Named for: Mohammed bin Salman

Government
  - Body: Misk Foundation
  - CEO: David Henry
  - Chairman: Ghassan Alshibl

Area
  - Total: 3.4 km^{2} (1.3 sq mi)
- Time zone: UTC+03:00 (SAST)
- Website: miskcity.sa

Mohammed Bin Salman Nonprofit City (Arabic: مدينة محمد بن سلمان غير الربحية), also known as Misk City, is an under-construction special district in the Irqah neighborhood of northwestern Riyadh, Saudi Arabia, near Valley Hanifa. Covering 840 acres (3.4 km^{2}), the development was announced by the Misk Foundation in November 2021 and is planned as the world's first non-profit city.

The district is intended to serve as a hub for innovation, entrepreneurship, education, and youth development. Its master plan includes schools and academic institutions, as well as a science centre, conference center, creative center, art gallery, residential areas, and commercial, cultural, and recreational facilities.

== Overview ==
Mohammed Bin Salman Nonprofit City was first unveiled by Misk Foundation in November 2021 as the world's first planned nonprofit city. Its details of the masterplan were released by Misk Foundation in March 2022. In April 2022, Saudi-based Manga Productions announced moving its main offices to the district and David Henry was appointed as the chief executive officer for Mohammed Bin Salman Nonprofit City.

In June 2022, an Australian architectural firm, Conrad Gargett, was awarded the contract to design the new headquarters for MiSK Foundation that will be located in the area.

In July 2022, Prince Mohammed Bin Salman Nonprofit City announced the establishment of al-Mishraq commercial residential central zone. In August 2022, Prince Mohammed Bin Salman Nonprofit City signed an agreement with the Saudi-based muvi Cinemas to open a cinema hall al-Mishraq.

In September 2022, it signed a memorandum of understanding with the country's Ministry of Culture's Fashion Commission to empower the nation's fashion and lifestyle sector.

On 20 May 2023, Sara bint Mashour, Mohammed's wife, officially launched Ilmi technology and science centre. The project is expected to be inaugurated by 2025. A $478 million contract was awarded to Dubai-based Alec Engineering and Contracting with AtkinsRéalis and WSP as project consultants. The contract includes the construction of a 27,000 m^{2} educational centre.

In April 2024, the Gates Foundation announced the opening of its first regional office in partnership with Misk Foundation in Mohammed Bin Salman Nonprofit City. The announcement was made during the World Economic Forum special meeting held in Riyadh, Saudi Arabia.

== See also ==
- Provinces of Saudi Arabia
- List of Saudi Vision 2030 projects
- List of governorates of Saudi Arabia
- List of cities and towns in Saudi Arabia
