= Future's Folktales =

Saudi Arabian–Japanese animated series

- Future's Folktales أساطير في قادم الزمان
- Key visual of the first season

アサティール 未来の昔ばなし (Asatir: Mirai no Mukashibanashi)
- Genre: Science fiction Fantasy; Folklore; Adventure kodomo
- Created by: Essam Bukhary; Peter Cooper; Amr Almaddah
- Anime television series
- Directed by: Masami Shimoda
- Written by: Masakazu Hashimoto
- Music by: Hiroki Kikuta
- Studio: Toei Animation; Manga Productions
- Licensed by: NA: Sentai Filmworks
- Original network: MBC4, MBC3, Spacetoon
- Original run: January 24, 2020 – February 2, 2025
- Episodes: 26
- Video game

Future's Folktales: Adventures (Future's Folktales Hopper Quest)
- Developer: Manga Productions
- Genre: Adventure
- Platform: iOS, Android, HarmonyOS
- Released: 10 September 2024

Asateer – Future's Folktales (Note: (Arabic: أساطير في قادم الزمان, romanized: Asateer Fi Qadem Al Zaman, Japanese: アサティール 未来の昔ばなし, romanized: Asatīru: Mirai no Mukashibanashi)) is a Saudi Arabian–Japanese animated series co-produced by Manga Productions and Toei Animation.

== Plot ==
The first season is set in Riyadh in the year 2050, revolving around an old woman named Asmaa who narrates folktales from the Arabian Peninsula to her three grandchildren. The second season was set in Neom.

== Production ==
Future's Folktales was a co-production between two animation firms, Manga Productions of Saudi Arabia and Toei Animation of Japan. In 2021, Manga and Toei entered a partnership with the developer of the planned community Neom, which was made the setting of the second season.

== Broadcast and distribution ==
Future's Folktales was first broadcast in January 2020 and was made available to various television broadcasters in Japan, mainland China, Taiwan, Ireland, the United Kingdom and the United States. Sentai Filmworks holds the rights to broadcast the series in North America, while the series premiered in Japan on J Tele on 4 April 2020.

== Episode list ==
Season	Episodes	Originally released	
Season	Episodes	First released	Last released
1	13	January 24, 2020	April 17, 2020
2	13	November 3, 2024	February 2, 2025

=== Season 1 (2020) ===
No.	Title	Directed by	Written by	Original release date	Japanese air date
1	"Zarqa"	Ayumi Ono	Noritomo Hattori and Aizumi Shion	24 January 2020	April 4, 2020
2	"Favorite Phrase"	Michita Shiraishi	Minoru Okabe and Yukari Kobayashi	31 January 2020	April 11, 2020
3	"Camel"	Michita Shiraishi	Akiko Nakano	7 February 2020	April 18, 2020
4	"Brother"	Cai Xianya	Asuna Imahashi	14 February 2020	April 25, 2020
5	"Banana"	Ayumu Ono	Yukari Kobayashi	21 February 2020	May 2, 2020
6	"Rabab"	Ayumu Ono	Satoshi Inoue	28 February 2020	May 9, 2020
7	"Anter"	Rei Mano	Kwon Yong-sang	6 March 2020	May 16, 2020
8	"Salt"	Michita Shiraishi	Akiko Nakano	13 March 2020	May 23, 2020
9	"Quiet Princess"	Hidehiko Kadota	Kwon Yong-sang	20 March 2020	May 30, 2020
10	"Hartim"	Hidehiko Kadota	Kwon Yong-sang	27 March 2020	June 6, 2020
11	"Good Man"	Ayumu Ono	Akiko Nakano	3 April 2020	June 13, 2020
12	"Heritage"	Michita Shiraishi	Akiko Nakano	10 April 2020	June 20, 2020
13	"Grandmother Story"	Masami Shimoda	Rei Mano	17 April 2020	June 27, 2020

=== Season 2 (2024) ===
No. overall	No. in season	Title	Directed by	Written by	Original release date	Japanese air date
14	1	"The Night the Wolf Cried"	Kohei Kuratomi	Unknown	3 November 2024	3 November 2024
15	2	"Naash's Daughters"	Unknown	Unknown	10 November 2024	10 November 2024
16	3	"The Nameless Faris"	Unknown	Unknown	17 November 2024	17 November 2024
17	4	"Jared's Legend"	Unknown	Unknown	24 November 2024	24 November 2024
18	5	"Tanbouri's Shoes"	Unknown	Unknown	1 December 2024	1 December 2024
19	6	"Poison and Sweetness"	Kōjin Ochi	Unknown	8 December 2024	8 December 2024
20	7	"Throw Those Squashes Away and Carry Me!"	Kōjin Ochi	Unknown	15 December 2024	15 December 2024
21	8	"Iyas the Judge"	Unknown	Unknown	22 December 2024	22 December 2024
22	9	"Mulukhiyah Wars"	Unknown	Unknown	5 January 2025	5 January 2025
23	10	"Nafla and Nahla"	Unknown	Unknown	12 January 2025	12 January 2025
24	11	"The Old Lady and the Jinni"	Kōjin Ochi	Unknown	19 January 2025	19 January 2025
25	12	"The Mermaid's Gifts"	Unknown	Unknown	26 January 2025	26 January 2025
26	13	"Stories Are Our Treasures"	Unknown	Unknown	2 February 2025	2 February 2025
