= Al-Qalis Church =

Oriental Orthodox church building in Sanaa, Yemen

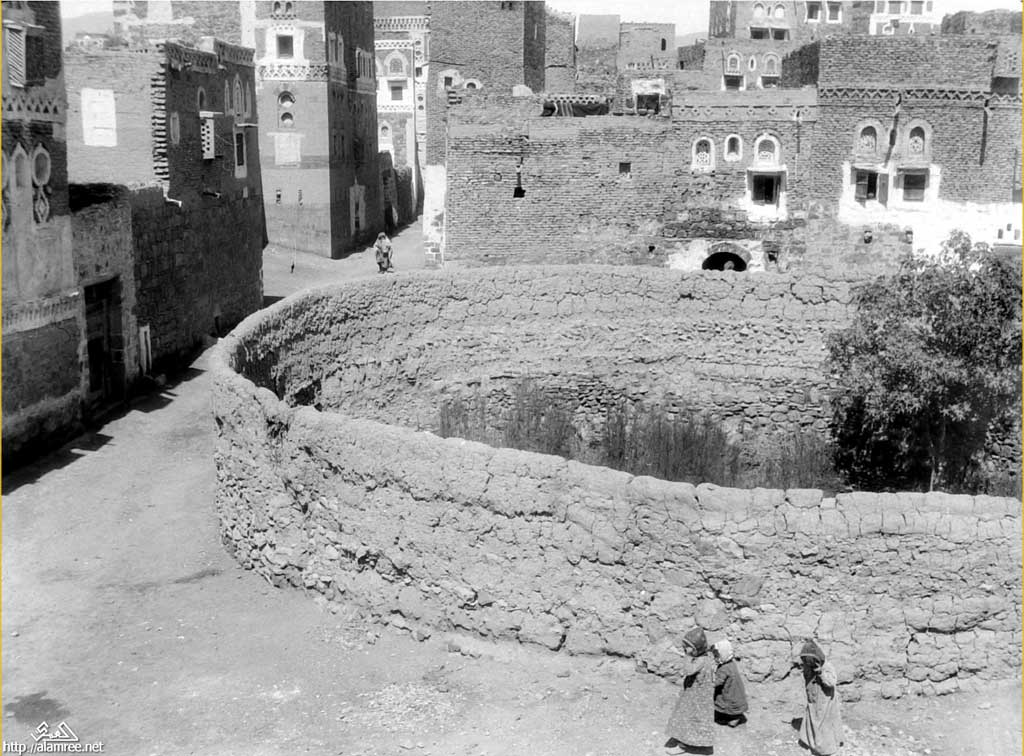
- Remains of the church in 1942.

Religion
- Affiliation: Ethiopian Orthodox
- Rite: Ge'ez
- Year consecrated: 6th century

Location
- Location: Sanaa Municipality, Yemen
- Interactive map of Al-Qalis Church

Architecture
- Architect: Abraha
- Type: Church
- Style: Aksumite
- Completed: 6th century

The Al-Qalis Church was a Miaphysite Oriental Orthodox church and cathedral constructed sometime between 527 and the late 560s in the city of Sanaa in modern-day Yemen.

The church's lavish decorations made it an important place of pilgrimage, placing it in competition with Kaaba in Mecca.

The cathedral was built by Abraha. He also built a similar one in Najran for Bani Al-Harith, the House of Allat in Taif for the tribe of Thaqeef, the House of Yareem and the House of Ghamdan in Yemen.

== Background ==
In the aftermath of the massacre of the Christian community of Najran by the Jewish ruler Dhu Nuwas of the Himyarite Kingdom, the Miaphysite King Kaleb of Aksum sought to avenge the deaths of his brothers in faith by launching a punitive expedition (520) into the Yemeni kingdom. Dhu Nuwas was deposed and killed, prompting Kaleb to appoint a Christian Himyarite, Sumyafa Ashwa (Esimiphaios), as his viceroy. However, around 525 this viceroy was deposed by the Aksumite general Abraha with support of Ethiopians who had settled in Yemen and withheld tribute to Kaleb. When Kaleb sent another expedition against Abraha this force defected, killing their commander, and joining Abraha. Another expedition sent against them met the same fate, leaving Yemen under Abraha's rule.

== Construction ==
Abraha sought to promote Miaphysite Christianity in the predominantly Jewish kingdom of Himyar while also attempting to antagonise the Kaaba in Mecca, a major religious centre for the adherents of Arab polytheism. Abraha, therefore, ordered the construction of the Al-Qalis Church (also known as Al-Qulays and Al-Qullays, an Arabized form of the Byzantine Greek word ἐκκλησία) in Sanaa. Letters were sent to both Aksum and the Byzantine Empire, requesting marble, craftsmen and mosaics. The absence of mosaic making tradition in pre-Islamic Arabia and Ethiopia at the time, along with the frequent use of mosaicists by the Byzantines to achieve diplomatic objectives corroborates that the Byzantines complied. Historian Procopius records that an envoy was dispatched to Abraha during the reign of emperor Justinian I, placing the construction of that church between 527 and the late 560s.

This church was constructed by Abraha from green, yellow, white and black stone which was brought from an older castle located at Marib. Leading to that church was a marble staircase, while the door was made of bronze or copper. This church combined three separate architectural elements known as bayt, iwan and qubbah. Iwan and qubbah, consisted of mosaic ornamentation of floral motives and gold star for the former, and polychrome mosaic crosses, silver and gold for the latter. Taking into consideration a Byzantine edict issued in 427 AD prohibiting the placement of crosses to locations where they can be stepped upon, it is probable that the crosses were positioned on the walls. The rest of the decoration consisted of carved precious woods and ivory, combined with gold panels inset with precious stones and crosses. Chroniclers make no reference to figurative representations, a style commonly encountered in the aniconic Syrian and Palestinian mosaic traditions.

The influence of this church as a place of pilgrimage may have been the reason behind the actions of Mecca's pagans who attempted to befoul that church. Between 552-555 AD, Abraha organised a punitive expedition in response to this incident. In 685 AD, the pretender to the throne of the Umayyad Caliphate Abd Allah ibn al-Zubayr, removed three columns along with a number of mosaics from that church, with intention of using them in the redecoration of the Great Mosque of Mecca. This incident marks the first recorded use of mosaics in Islamic architecture. This church is said to have survived at least until the reign of the Abbasid caliph Al-Mansur (714–775) at which point it was looted once more.

== See also ==
- Early Byzantine mosaics in the Middle East
- Year of the Elephant
