= Street children in Latin America =

Many street children in Latin America, who either live or work in the streets of developing countries, are impoverished. Although most are still in contact with their families, almost all street children spend a significant portion of their days working on the streets for money. As the population of street children in Latin America has grown, public opinion of street children has decreased, putting them at risk for victimization and abuse by strangers and public officials. Many non-government organizations have begun rehabilitation and outreach programs to treat the growing population of street children.

== Definition ==
Street children in Latin America generally fall into two categories: home-based and street-based. Children “on the streets” are home-based; they work on the street during the day but have homes and families that they return to at night. Children “of the street” are street-based; they spend all of their time on the streets and do not have homes or contact with their families. In Latin America, street children are commonplace, everyday presences. They are street vendors, street workers, and street entertainers, as well as beggars and thieves. Although street children may occasionally prostitute themselves, child prostitutes and victims of human trafficking are not generally considered street children. There is no clear consensus on how many street children exist in Latin America, mainly because of the difficulties in identifying and defining street children. Some studies claim that as many as 45% of children in Latin America are street children, 75–90% of whom are home-based. Number estimates of street children in Latin America range from 8 million to 40–50 million.

== General characteristics ==
These children are usually indigenous boys between the ages of 10 and 15. Because girls typically assist in household chores, they are less likely to work on the streets. Most street children grow up without significant familial support and little to no education.

Almost all street children work. Some are self-employed: they offer services such as car cleaning, car guarding, tour guiding, and shoe shining. Some are employed by market traders to sell goods such as fruit, candy, and newspapers. Others scavenge for items and food to sell, use, or eat. Most female street children and some male home-based street children work on the streets with their parents or siblings, selling food and candy. Street-based street children are more likely to engage in illegal activities such as shoplifting, stealing, and selling drugs. Home-based street children may attend school during the day and work on the streets in the afternoon and evenings, or they may not attend school and spend most of their day either on the streets or helping with household tasks. Street-based children are less likely to attend school than home-based.

== Causes ==
The primary cause of street children is poverty. Almost all Latin American street children work on the streets, either to support themselves or to support their families. While street children in the United States are often from neglectful or abusive families, street children in Latin America are often from impoverished families that cannot afford to support them. They are not runaways or discontent with their lives. Instead, they are forced on the street due to economic necessities.

=== The process of becoming a street child ===
Home-based street children can emerge when families in desperate economic situations send their children to seek work on the streets. Children may first accompany their parents or older siblings on their street jobs, and then transition to their own jobs. As children spend increasing amounts of time on the streets, engaging in street work and activities, they become more independent and see their families less and less. Eventually they may become completely estranged from their families, thus becoming street-based street children. Other times, the switch to a street-based street child is more abrupt: some children are cast onto the streets, losing complete contact with their families, due to family issues such as the death of a parent. As street-based street children, these youth must provide for their own basic necessities such as food, water, clothing, and shelter. Many of these street children are also migrants. With or without their families, they travel from rural areas to urban cities in search of work. Some children leave their homes with the intention of reaching USA. Yet when they arrive in the cities, they discover that their opportunities are limited to street work. In recent years, natural disasters such as Hurricane Mitch and the earthquake in Haiti have dramatically increased the population of families in poverty and therefore the number of migrant families and children.

Besides low economic status, studies have shown that larger populations of street children emerge when there is insufficient housing, inadequate government support and assistance for those in poverty, a high birth rate, and a high incidence of rural-to-urban migration. This is especially prevalent in Honduras, where poverty drives poor families to seek work in cities. Once in cities, these same families feel pressured to have more children to increase their labor assets because of the large working street child population. Some visitors have reported that Tegucigalpa, the capital of Honduras, is overflowing with street children. Likewise, in Brazil, urban street children are generally males originally from rural, economically disadvantaged families that work in agriculture. However, although an overarching reason for many street children in Latin America is poverty, different regions have different vulnerability factors as well. In La Paz, Bolivia, one study that surveyed 124 children "of the street" reported five primary reasons for leaving home: 40% said physical abuse, 18% said death of a parent, 16% said being abandoned, 13% said mental abuse, and 7% said poverty. Studies in Mexico also show that parental neglect, physical abuse, and abandonment increase children's vulnerabilities. Living in Mexican urban slums, called colonias marginales, also places these children at risk for becoming street children because they often lack economic stability, educational opportunities, public services, social infrastructure.

== Vulnerabilities ==
Once children shift into children of the street or children on the street, their vulnerabilities increase. They have decreased access to housing, education, parental or adult support and protection. In Ciudad Juarez, Mexico, where child welfare programs are severely lacking, children of the streets reportedly have no aspirations because their opportunities to reenter their communities as contributing members of societies are nonexistent. Street children in Latin America are more likely to have health-related issues due to drug and alcohol usage, living in polluted environments, fighting with other street children and police, and unprotected sexual intercourse. Street children are especially vulnerable and become victims of sexual exploitation. Most street children spend their time in overcrowded, unsanitary areas which increases their risk of infection and disease. Many are exposed to hazardous working conditions that increase their likelihood of being attacked, mugged, and sexually harassed. In Honduras, one study revealed that 59% of children on the street eat three meals a day, 33% eat two meals, 8% eat one meal. For children of the street, 6% eat three meals a day. The same study determined that the leading causes of death among street children are health-related; respiratory infections, skin ailments, physical trauma, and dental issues are among the most common health concerns that result in death when untreated for street children. Although these conditions and diseases are treatable, many street children do not have access to medical care.

== Issues surrounding street children ==
=== Groups ===
Many street-based children form peer support groups (called turmas in Brazil) for physical protection from assaults and for emotional support. Groups are usually made up of street-based children; home-based children without parental supervision on the streets may have friends that protect them, but they are usually not part of a specific peer support group. Although they are not technically “gangs” with hierarchies and leaders, these groups often have strict rules, punishments, and initiation ceremonies. Consequently, peer groups often influence members to engage in illegal drug usage, drug dealing, and theft.

Peer groups provide street children with a sense of identity. Although groups usually form firstly for physical protection, their secondary function of providing camaraderie and love is often just as significant for the mental health and stability of street children. These peer groups are also outlets for sexual behavior; sexual relationships with friends within peer groups reinforce bonds between group members, but sex and rape can also be used as a punishment for rule breakers. Most of these sexual acts are unprotected, increasing the risk and spread of STDs such as HIV among street children.

=== Drugs ===
Some of the prevalent drugs among street children are everyday inhalants (i.e. paint, glue), marijuana, cough syrup, substituted amphetamines, cocaine, and hallucinogenic teas. In Brazil, Colombia, Bolivia, Venezuela, Ecuador, and Peru, coca paste is a popular drug for sale and use among street children. Though coca paste is a precursor to cocaine made from coca leaves, studies have shown that it is more dangerous, as it contains toxic processing chemicals such as kerosene, sulfuric acid, and methanol, which are removed from cocaine. Glue is another frequently used and dangerous drug. In Honduras and Guatemala, children sniff Resistol, a toluene-based glue. Although toluene produces a desirable high, it is also a neurotoxin. Prolonged exposure leads to irreversible nerve damage, muscle deterioration, loss of brain function, dysfunctional kidneys and livers, and diminished ability to see and hear. Despite public outcry and pressure to change, the company that produces Resistol, H. B. Fuller, has generally denied its role in enabling the destructive behaviors of street children. They have replaced toluene with cyclohexene, another neurotoxin that produces the same high and has the same side effects.

More street-based children engage in drug usage than home-based, and many street-based children are dependent on drugs. Street children take drugs for a variety of reasons: to allay hunger; to deal with loneliness, fear, and despair; to feel warm in the cold; and to cope with prostitution and theft. Although many sociologists report mentally stable street children, others suggest that drugs may affect street children's cognitive functions and perceptions. Drugs may also increase their violent and sexual inclinations.

=== Victimization and arrest ===
Many street-based children have been in juvenile court or prison due to theft or vagrancy. Some street children report the police—not hunger or loneliness—as their greatest fear. In Brazil, between 1988 and 1990, a recorded 4,611 street children were murdered by police. High numbers of street children murders by police have also been reported in Guatemala and Colombia. Hostility and violence towards street children may originate from their indigenous background, indicated by their darker skin, or from their insubordination to authority figures. Street children are commonly viewed as threats to society, as thieves and criminals. Under child labor laws, even legal work is illegal, and street children are thus often legal targets for police harassment and incarceration, even if they are not selling drugs, stealing, or engaging in other illegal activities. Children have worked on the streets of Latin America for centuries, yet it is only recently that the prevailing public perception of them has been negative. People group street children with criminals and school drop-outs, as mentally unstable and emotionally underdeveloped individuals incapable of contributing to society.

Street children also fear each other: street children frequently attack each other with knives and fists to protect their jobs or property. Older street children often rob younger ones of their valuables. Younger girls are the most often victimized by both older boys and adults by physical assault and sexual harassment.

=== Mental health ===
The mental state and health of street children is a controversial topic. Some studies claim that the constant malnutrition, drug usage, sexual activity, abuse and harassment that street children suffer from and engage in results in decreased mental and emotional health. They have found that street children often have low self-esteem and are prone to anxiety and depression. Other studies suggest that street children are more mentally stable than the public perceives and media portrays them to be. A study conducted in Bogotá showed that street children were independent, creative, and well-supported by their peers. In Brazil, surveyed street children said they were optimistic about the futures: they wanted to leave the streets and aspired to pursue careers such as manufacturers, artists, teachers, and drivers. Very few said they did not want to work. However, many studies on the mental state of street children are inconclusive because of the unknown effects of drugs, and the varied experiences and situations of street children.

== Difficulties in studying street children ==
Although some researchers think that there is an ample amount of reliable research on street children in Latin America that points towards possible policies and solutions, many others disagree. Street children in Latin America are difficult subjects to study because researchers face various challenges in the methodology of their research that other areas may not encounter. For example, some children are afraid to discuss their lives and situations, and those that are willing to are often unreliable sources of information—they are prone to lying about their age, activities, family backgrounds. The lack of records and public information about street children makes it difficult to verify information. Public perception of street children is often negative and influences researchers to focus on immediate solutions instead of first understanding the issues. Some research, funded by non-governmental organizations, also attempts to collect information from the most troubled and struggling street children in order to raise their organization's reputation. As street children are a vulnerable population, many researchers also find themselves sympathetic and biased towards their subjects, unable to write objective research articles, which weakens the validity of research surrounding street children.

Much information on Latin American street children is also unpublished, or not published academically. In Brazil, the term "street children" is also relatively new; only in the last 20 years has it become a part of everyday language. There is a lack of cohesion within the community of researchers interested in Latin American research. The body of research and knowledge about Latin American street children is not streamlined or conducted and analyzed in a systematic way. Researchers, especially ones focusing on different countries, work independently of each other, and do not have effective platforms for discussion and deeper understanding of the issues.

== Solutions, policies, and programs ==
=== Institutionalization ===
In the past, there have been efforts to institutionalize street children, to “re-educate” and “correct” street children. In Brazil, over half a million street children were institutionalized in 1985. However, this approach proved to be ineffective and expensive: it treated all street children like criminals, when a majority were not, and focused on “correctional education” instead of providing the necessary support and care that street children needed and lacked while on the streets.

=== Rehabilitation ===
Other organizations such as local churches and volunteer organizations have approached the problem through rehabilitation. This approach takes the near opposite of institutionalization: it cares for children, providing them with shelter, food, education, clothing, medical care, and a safe environment. It successfully provides for children and helps them survive, but often does not effectively motivate children to seek legitimate employment or get off the streets. Like institutionalization, rehabilitation is expensive. Furthermore, most rehabilitation programs are long-term commitments that street children are unwilling to make.

=== Outreach ===
Based on these past attempts to recover street children, most organizations now take the outreach approach. Instead of focusing on providing for street children and society's perceptions of street children, the outreach approach views street children as results of poverty and works to empower them by teaching them problem-solving skills and treating their issues on a community-by-community basis. Many outreach-based programs send street teachers to educate children on their home turf (parks, sidewalks, parking lots) about applicable issues.

By helping street children in their everyday difficulties, these organizations help children provide for themselves. For example, street educators throughout Latin America have helped street children form working relationships with market traders—instead of tossing and further damaging unwanted fruit, market traders give slightly damaged and overripe fruit to street children to eat or sell. In Asunción, Paraguay, outreach workers identified that many street children were suffocating when they built fires in cisterns and then trapped themselves in the space. Outreach organizations educated street children on how to safely handle and build fires, and also were advocates for street children who died trying to survive. Some criticize outreach programs because they, like rehabilitation programs, do not fix the issue of street children. Proponents of outreach programs claim that their practices are built on the ideology that street children are unfortunate effects of societal deficiencies, and therefore the only way to effectively assist street children is through empowerment and applicable assistance.

=== Prevention ===
To complement the outreach approach, other organizations such as UNICEF take a preventative approach to the issue: they provide programs to empower and employ poor families, to try to raise them out of poverty so that children are not driven to the streets, and also work with policy makers to address the underlying issues such as unemployment, rural-to-urban migration, and insufficient housing. In Paraguay, efforts have been made to increase school hours and education to keep children off the streets. Other efforts include more vocational training for parents, welfare programs for families in poverty, and increased affordable day care for children. However, like other approaches, preventative efforts are expensive. Most Latin American governments are in too much debt to have effective welfare or educational programs.

== See also ==
- Gamín, a 1977 documentary film about street children in Bogota.
