= Misk Foundation =

Saudi Arabian non-profit foundation

Misk Foundation مؤسسة مسك
- Mohammed Bin Salman Foundation مؤسسة محمد بن سلمان
- Formation: 2011; 15 years ago
- Founder: Mohammed bin Salman
- Type: Non-profit organization
- Headquarters: Misk City, Riyadh
- Key people: Bader Al-Bader (CEO)
- Subsidiaries: Misk City; Electronic Gaming Development Company; Manga Productions ilmi Science Discovery and Innovation Center; Misk Art Institute; Misk Schools; Riyadh Schools
- Website: misk.org.sa/en/

The Misk Foundation, also known as the Mohammed bin Salman Foundation, is a Saudi Arabian non-profit and non-governmental organization established in 2011 by Mohammed bin Salman, the Crown Prince of Saudi Arabia. The foundation focuses on education, culture, media, innovation, and entertainment. The Misk Foundation is headquartered in the Mohammed bin Salman Nonprofit City (Misk City) in Riyadh.

== History ==
The Misk Foundation was established in 2011 by Mohammad bin Salman. The organization was created as a nonprofit focused on youth development, with programs centered on education, culture, technology, and media.

The Misk Global Forum was launched in 2016 by the foundation as an annual platform focused on youth empowerment, leadership development, and innovation.

The Misk Foundation established the Misk Art Institute in 2017. Saudi artist Ahmed Mater served as the director from 2017 to 2018. In 2018, Mater oversaw the first Saudi National Pavilion at the Architecture Exhibition at La Biennale di Venezia.

Also in 2017, the Bill & Melinda Gates Foundation committed $5 million to the Misk Foundation. In November 2018, following the murder of journalist Jamal Khashoggi, the Gates Foundation suspended its planned engagement with the organization, stating that the killing was “extremely troubling.”

In July 2019, it was announced that Dr. Badr Al-Bader was appointed CEO of the Misk Foundation.

The Misk Launchpad program was started in September 2021 in partnership with RiseUp, a business development platform. The program aims to support and develop young male and female entrepreneurs and youth projects through a three-month program.

In April 2022, Manga Productions, a subsidiary of the Misk Foundation, acquired a 96% stake in the Japanese video game company SNK. In August 2022, the Misk Foundation’s community platform launched its second Youth Voice Program, an initiative designed to provide participants with training related to communication skills.

The Misk Global Forum, held in November 2022, hosted over 100 speakers who focused on topics related to bridging generational gaps. The two-day event took place at the King Abdulaziz International Conference Center in Riyadh and marked the 10th anniversary of the Misk Foundation. As of April 2026, the Misk Global Forum had held eight completed editions since its launch in 2016.

The Misk Foundation launched the fourth edition of the “Leaders 2030” program in January 2023, which included 90 male and female CEOs who are heads of departments from public, private, and voluntary sectors. The program focuses on leadership development in alignment with Saudi Vision 2030. According to the foundation, earlier iterations of the program have graduated 180 participants as part of a broader target of training 2,000 leaders by 2030.

During the 2023 Misk Global Forum, a memorandum of cooperation with the Human Resources Development Fund was signed to support the training and qualifications of young individuals for in-demand professions.

In April 2024, Bill & Melinda Gates Foundation announced the opening of its first regional office in partnership with the Misk Foundation, in Mohammed Bin Salman Nonprofit City. The announcement was made during the World Economic Forum special meeting held in Riyadh, Saudi Arabia. In November 2024, the Tuwaiq Academy partnered with the Misk Foundation to support training in advanced technologies, including data science, artificial intelligence, video game production, and user experience design.

At the Misk Global Forum in November 2024, the Gates Foundation and the Misk Foundation announced the “Challenge for Change” program, an initiative to support Saudi non-profit organizations and social enterprises developing solutions in the fields of technology, health and well-being, and environmental sustainability. The program officially launched in April 2025.

In December 2024, the foundation was awarded the WELL gold certificate for its innovative urban design while being committed to creating sustainable spaces.

In April 2025, the foundation partnered with London Business School to improve leadership and executive education for youth and Saudi leaders in alignment with Saudi Vision 2030 goals.

== Subsidiaries ==
The Misk Foundation has multiple subsidiaries across various sectors.

=== Real Estate ===
Mohammed Bin Salman Nonprofit City, also known as Misk City, is an 840-acre development under construction in northern Riyadh, designed to be the world’s first "non-profit city" The city will include residential areas and will serve as the headquarters and central hub for the Foundation’s subsidiaries.

=== Animation and Comics ===
Manga Productions was founded in 2017. It produces animated series and films, comics, and localizes video games into Arabic, as well as developing video games.

=== Video Games ===
Electronic Gaming Development Company (EGDC) is the foundation's gaming arm. Through EGDC, Misk owns SNK and holds stakes in other publishers, including Capcom.

=== Education ===
The foundation oversees several educational institutions, including the Misk Art Institute, Misk Schools, and Riyadh Schools.

=== Innovation ===
Misk operates the ilmi Science Discovery and Innovation Center, which focuses on science, technology, engineering, arts, and mathematics (STEAM) education and research.

== See also ==
- Public Investment Fund
- Jeddah Economic Forum
