= Quraysh (surah) =

106th chapter of the Qur'an

Surah 106 of the Quran
قُرَيْش Quraysh Quraish (tribe)
- Qira'ah; English text
- Classification: Meccan
- Position: Juzʼ 30
- No. of verses: 4
- No. of words: 17
- No. of letters: 73

Quraysh (surah)
Recitation of Quraysh (surah) in mujawwad.

Quraysh (Arabic: قريش, "[Chapter of the] Quraysh tribe") is the 106th chapter (surah) of the Qur'an consisting of 4 ayat or verses. The surah takes its name from the word "Quraysh" in the first verse.

== Summary ==
- 1-4 The Quraysh exhorted to thank God for commercial privileges.

== Text and meaning ==
=== Text and transliteration ===
- Hafs from Aasim ibn Abi al-Najud

بِسْمِ ٱللَّهِ ٱلرَّحْمَٰنِ ٱلرَّحِيمِ ۝
Bismi l-lāhi r-raḥmāni r-raḥīm(i)
لِإِيلَٰفِ قُرَيْشٍ ۝١
¹ Liʾīlāfi quraysh(in)
إِۦلَٰفِهِمْ رِحْلَةَ ٱلشِّتَآءِ وَٱلصَّيْفِ ۝٢
² ʾīlāfihim riḥlata sh-shitāʾi waṣ-ṣayf(i)
فَلْيَعْبُدُوا رَبَّ هَٰذَا ٱلْبَيْتِ ۝٣
³ Falyaʿbudū rabba hādhā l-bayt(i)
ٱلَّذِىٓ أَطْعَمَهُم مِّن جُوعٍ وَءَامَنَهُم مِّنْ خَوْفٍ ۝٤
⁴ al-ladhī ʾaṭʿamahum mmin jūʿin waʾāmanahum mmin khawf(in)

- Warsh from Nafiʽ al-Madani

بِسمِ اِلله الرَّحمَٰنِ اِ۬لرَّحِيمِ ۝
Bismi l-lāhi r-raḥmāni r-raḥīm(i)
لِإِيلَٰفِ قُرَيۡشٍ ۝١
¹ Liʾīlāfi quraysh(in)
إِۦلَٰفِهِم رِحلَةَ الشِّتَآءِ وَالصَّيفِ ۝٢
² ’īlāfihim riḥlata sh-shitāʾi waṣ-ṣayf(i)
فَليَعبُدُوا رَبَّ هَٰذَا اَلبَيتِ ۝٣
³ Falyaʿbudū rabba hādha l-bayt(i)
أَلَّذِےٓ أَطعَمَهُم مِّن جُوعٍ ۝٤
⁴ ʾal-ladhī ʾaṭʿamahum mmin jūʿ(in)
وَءَامَنَهُم مِّن خَوفٍ ۝٥
⁵ Waʾāmanahum mmin khawf(in)

=== Meanings ===
^{1} (It is a great Grace and Protection from God) for the taming of the Quraish,
^{2} (And with all those God’s Grace and Protections for their taming, We cause) the (Quraish) caravans to set forth safe in winter (to the south), and in summer (to the north without any fear),
^{3} So let them worship (God) the Lord of this House (the Ka'bah in Makkah).
^{4} (He) Who has fed them against hunger, and has made them safe from fear.

Translation: Noble Quran, 1999

^{1} For the accustomed security of the Quraysh –
^{2} Their accustomed security [in] the caravan of winter and summer –
^{3} Let them worship the Lord of this House,
^{4} Who has fed them, [saving them] from hunger and made them safe, [saving them] from fear.

Translation: Saheeh International, 1997

^{1} For the covenants (of security and safeguard enjoyed) by the Quraish,
^{2} Their covenants (covering) journeys by winter and summer, -
^{3} Let them adore the Lord of this House,
^{4} Who provides them with food against hunger, and with security against fear (of danger).

Translation: Yusuf Ali, 1934

^{1} For the taming of Qureysh
^{2} For their taming (We cause) the caravans to set forth in winter and summer.
^{3} So let them worship the Lord of this House,
^{4} Who hath fed them against hunger and hath made them safe from fear.

Translation: Pickthall, 1930

== Asbāb al-nuzūl ==
Asbāb al-nuzūl (أسباب النزول), meaning occasions or circumstances of revelation, refers to the historical context in which Quranic ayaat were revealed. Regarding the timing and contextual background of the revelation (asbāb al-nuzūl), it is an earlier "Meccan surah", which means it is believed to have been revealed in Mecca, rather than later in Medina. Alī ibn Ahmad al-Wāhidī (d. 468/1075), is the earliest scholar of the branch of the Qur'anic sciences known as Asbāb al-Nuzūl. He records that

Umm Hani bint Abi Talib who reported that the Prophet, Allah bless him and give him peace, said: “Allah has favoured the Quraysh with seven characteristics which He has never given to anyone before them and will never give to anyone after them:

1) The post of the Caliph (al-Khilafah) is given to one among them,

2) the custody of the Sacred House (al-Hijabah) is assumed by someone from amongst them,

3) giving water to the pilgrims (al-Siqayah) during Hajj is undertaken by someone amongst them,

4) prophethood is given to someone amongst them,

5) they were given victory over the [army of] elephants(Al-Fil),

6) they worshipped Allah for seven years during which none worshipped Him,

7) and a Surah has been revealed about them in which none but them was mentioned (Quraysh (surah)).

== Summary ==
This surah urges the Quraysh tribe who dominated Mecca to serve God, who had protected them, for the sake of their own future. It is one of two suras containing 4 ayat; the other is Al-Ikhlas. It forms a pair with the preceding sura, al-Fil, reminding the Quraysh of the favors that Allah had bestowed upon them.

The Kaaba was central to the life of the Quraysh, being a center of pilgrimage which brought much trade and prestige. Sura al-Fil describes how God saved the Kaaba from destruction, while Sura Quraysh describes God as Lord of the Kaaba. It also urges the Quraysh to worship God so that, among other things, he would protect them on their trading journeys.
