= Ash-Sharh =

94th chapter of the Qur'an

Surah 94 of the Quran
الانشراح Al-Inshirāḥ The Solace
- Qira'ah; English text
- Classification: Meccan
- Alternate titles (Ar.): Sūrat al-Sharḥ (سورة الشرح)
- Other names: Comfort, Consolation, Relief, The Expansion, The Expanding, The Opening-Up of the Heart
- Position: Juzʼ 30
- No. of verses: 8
- No. of words: 27

Ash-Sharh
Recitation of Ash-Sharh in mujawwad.

Al-Inshirāḥ (Arabic: الانشراح, "Solace" or "Comfort"), or ash-Sharḥ (Arabic: الشرح, "The Opening-Up of the Heart") is the ninety-fourth chapter (surah) of the Qur'an, with eight ayat or verses. Because of its subject matter, length, style, and placement in the Qur'an, this sura is often coupled with Surah ad-Dhuha (Sura 93). They are generally considered to have been revealed around the same time. Al-Inshirāḥ's subject matter seems a continuation of the reassurance and encouragement given in the preceding chapter and so closely resembles it that both these Surah seem to have been revealed in about the same period under similar conditions.

Regarding the timing and contextual background of the revelation (asbāb al-nuzūl), it is an earlier "Meccan surah", which means it is believed to have been revealed in Mecca, instead of later in Medina. It is typically assumed that this sura is referring to the early days of Muhammad's prophethood when he would have been unsure about how his people would receive him.

== Summary ==
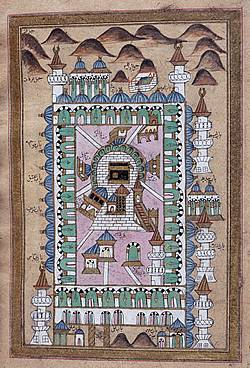
A map of Mecca, circa 1790. Sura Ash-Sharh was revealed in Mecca, around 611 CE.

- 1-4 God made Muhammad's mission easy for him
- 5-8 He is exhorted to labor and pray after the mission is ended

The passage asks the reader, who is Muhammad specifically, if God has been a comfort and a remover of obstacles. Whatever personal sorrows this may bring to mind, "Surely, with each difficulty there is ease". This may indeed be the key phrase of this sura; it is repeated in lines 5 and 6. Conversely, the reader is asked to continue their work diligently, even when it grows simple again - for God, Himself is what you are working for.

== Theme and subject matter ==
The aim and object of this Surah too are to console and encourage Muhammad. Before his call, he never had to encounter the conditions which he suddenly had to encounter after it, when he embarked on his mission of inviting the people to Islam. This was by itself a great revolution in his own life of which he had no idea in his life before prophethood. No sooner had he started preaching the message of Islam than the same society which had esteemed him with unique honor, turned hostile to him. The same relatives and friends, the same clansmen and neighbors, who used to treat him with the highest respect, began to shower him with abuse and invective. No one in Makkah was prepared to listen to him; he began to be ridiculed and mocked in the street and on the road, and at every step, he had to face new difficulties. Although gradually he became accustomed to the hardships, even much severe ones, the initial stage was very discouraging for him. That is why first Surah Ad-Duha was sent down to console him, and then this Surah.

In it, at the outset, Allah says: "We have favored you, O Prophet, with three great blessings; therefore you have no cause to be disheartened. The first is the blessing of Sharh Sadr (opening up of the chest), the second of removing from you the heavy burden that was weighing down your back before the call, and the third of exalting your renown the like of which has never been granted to any man before." Further below in the notes, we have explained what is implied by each of these blessings and how great and unique these blessings indeed are!

After this, Allah has reassured Muhammad that the period of hardships which he is passing through, is not very long, but following close behind it, there is also a period of ease. This same thing has been described in Surah Ad-Duha, saying: "Every later period is better for you than the former period, and soon your Lord will give you so much that you will be well pleased."

The Surah also repeats the phrase "Surely with hardship comes ease", setting a precedent that appears throughout the Quran that any single difficulty faced by Muhammad or his followers would be rewarded twice over (or more).

In conclusion, Muhammad has been instructed, to say, "You can develop the power to bear and resist the hardships of the initial stage only by one means, and it is this: 'When you are free from your occupations, you should devote yourself to the labor and toil of worship, and turn all your attention exclusively to your Lord'." This same instruction has been given to him in much greater detail in Surah Al-Muzzammil 1-9.
