= Al-Jinn =

72nd chapter of the Qur'an

Surah 72 of the Quran
الجن Al-Jinn The Jinn
- Qira'ah; English text
- Classification: Meccan
- Other names: Jinns, The Unseen Beings
- Position: Juzʼ 29
- No. of verses: 28
- No. of Rukus: 2
- No. of words: 286
- No. of letters: 1,109

Al-Jinn (Arabic: الجن, "The Jinn") is the 72nd chapter (sūrah) of the Quran with 28 verses (āyāt). The name as well as the topic of this chapter is jinn. In the Quran, it is stated in that humans are created from the earth and jinn from smokeless fire.

Although Al-Jinn is a Meccan surah, it is generally agreed that it was revealed much later than any other sura contained in Juz' Tabāraka -lladhi (which covers surahs 67 to 77). Abdullah Yusuf Ali says that it is "tolerably certain" that Al-Jinn was revealed around 2 B.H. when Muhammad was evangelising near present-day Ta'if. Maulana Muhammad Ali agrees with the date of around 2 B.H., saying that this surah was revealed at a time when opposition to the Prophet's message was reaching a climax.

== Summary ==
1-2 A number of jinn converted to Islam by hearing the Quran
3-7 The folly of men and jinn in ascribing offspring to God
8-9 jinn prying into heavenly secrets are driven away with fiery darts
10-14 Different classes of jinn, some Muslims and others infidels
15-18 Believing jinn rewarded in Paradise, the unbelievers punished in hell
19 The jinn pressed upon Muhammad to hear the Quran
20-24 Muhammad can only publish what hath been revealed to him
25-26 The judgments of God shall overtake the unbelievers
27-28 God revealeth his secrets to his apostles only

== Exegesis ==
=== 1 Definition of jinn ===
Muslim scholars discuss the definition of the term jinn: a) they are invisible bodies in which air and fire dominates b) disembodied spirits of the planets, mostly held by the philosophers c) the souls of the dead, often attributed to Christian beliefs.

=== 2 Jinn recant their belief in false gods ===
In the second verse the jinn recant their belief in false gods and venerate Muhammad for his monotheism. The jinn apologize for their past blasphemy and criticize mankind for either neglecting them or encouraging their disbelief.

=== 6 Discrediting veneration of jinn ===
The third verse mentions that travelers among humans sought refuge among the jinn, when they were scared, for example, when passing through a valley. When humans sought refuge among the jinn, it increased the sin of both the jinn and humans. Since the verse speaks about "men from the jinn", jinn are believed to have men and women among them, and that they procreate like humans do.

=== 7 Islamic Judgement Day, Qiyamah ===
The Judgement in verse 7, and the punishment in verse 25, are both references to the Islamic Judgement Day, Qiyamah.

=== 8 The jinn used to spy on heaven ===
The eighth verse speaks about the belief that jinn and devils spied on the gates of heaven to reveal news to soothsayers, until the skies were found filled with meteors.

=== 20-22 Monotheism among the Jinn is reaffirmed ===
Verses 20-22 are especially important as Monotheism (tawhid) among the Jinn is reaffirmed and the inescapable wrath of God is emphasized.

=== 25-28 Qiyamah is known only to God ===
Verses 25-28 establish that Qiyamah is known only to God, and that God takes into account all the deeds of a man when judging him.

== See also ==
- Mosque of the Jinn
