= Mujawwad =

Term for pronouncing the words and letters of the Quran correctly

Al-Fatiha
Recitation of Al-Fatiha in mujawwad.

Mujawwad is an adjective that comes from the noun tajweed which means pronouncing the words and letters of the Quran correctly and according to classic Arabic. Mujawwad is a melodic style of Quran recitation which is known throughout the Muslim world. As opposed to Murattal, multiple types of sectioning are used in regard to its phrase lengths. The vocal quality of Mujawwad can be relaxed, tense, or alternate between the two, to create a dramatic effect. The melodic structure tends to be step-wise, but leaps of a fourth or more are also used; Range can extend over an octave. The Melismatic properties of Mujawwad can be quite extensive as compared to the mostly syllabic content of Murattal; Quran recitation.

Murattal is the adjective of the noun tarteel, which is reciting the Quran in a slow mannered pace.
