= At-Takwir =

81st chapter of the Qur'an

Surah 81 of the Quran
التكوير At-Takwīr The Overthrowing
- Qira'ah; English text
- Classification: Meccan
- Other names: The Cessation, The Darkening, The Rolling, The turning into a sphere
- Position: Juzʼ 30
- No. of verses: 29
- No. of words: 104
- No. of letters: 435

At-Takwīr (Arabic: التكوير, literally “The Turning Into a Sphere”) is the eighty-first chapter (sura) of the Qur'an, with 29 verses (ayat). It discusses signs of the coming of the day of judgement.

== Summary ==
- 1-14 The terrible signs of the judgment-day, which will make every soul understand what he has brought (i.e, put forth)
- 15-18 Oaths to amplify the points of the following verses
- 19-21 The Quran is a word conveyed by Angel Gabriel, a noble and authorized messenger
- 22-24 Muhammad is not mad, neither does he possess knowledge of the unseen, and has seen Gabriel
- 25-29 The Quran an admonition to all men, and not the words of a devil

== Signs ==
Some of these signs include the following:

(a) When the sun is covered in darkness (solar eclipse),
(b) When the stars fall,
(c) And when the mountains vanish (blown away),
(d) When the camels big with young are abandoned.
(e) And when the wild beasts are herded together
(f) And when the seas rise,
(g) And when the souls are sorted,
(h) And when the girl [who was] buried alive is asked,
(i) For what crime she was killed?
(j) And when the books [records of deeds] are open,
(k) And when the sky is torn away,
(l) And when Hell is set ablaze,
(m) And when Paradise draws near,

== Hadith ==
- Whoever wants to see the Qiyamah with his/her eyes should read the verses of at-Takwir, al-Infitar and al-Inshiqaq.”
- Imam Ahmad recorded from Ibn Umar that the Messenger of Allah said: “Whoever wishes to look at the Day of Resurrection, as if he is seeing it with this eye, then let him recite: ‘When the sun Kuwwirat’(At-Takwir) and ‘When the heaven is cleft sunder (Al-Infitar) and ‘When the heaven is split asunder.(Al-Inshiqaq)’”
- It was narrated that Umar ibn Horayth said: "I heard the Prophet (ﷺ) reciting: 'When the sun is wound round.' in fajr. (at-Takwir (81:1)) "
- Sahabah reported that Muhammad used to recite surahs An-Naba (78) and Al-Mursalat (77) in one rak'ah, and surahs Ad-Dukhan (44) and At-Takwir (81) in one rak'ah.
