= Q83 =

Q83 may refer to:

- Q83 (New York City bus)
- Al-Mutaffifin, a surah of the Quran
- French submarine Bernouilli (Q83)
