= Q77 =

Q77 may refer to:

- Q77 (New York City bus)
- Al-Mursalat, a surah of the Quran
- French submarine Giffard
