= Memorial of the Holy Guardian Angels =

Feast in the Catholic Church, 2 October

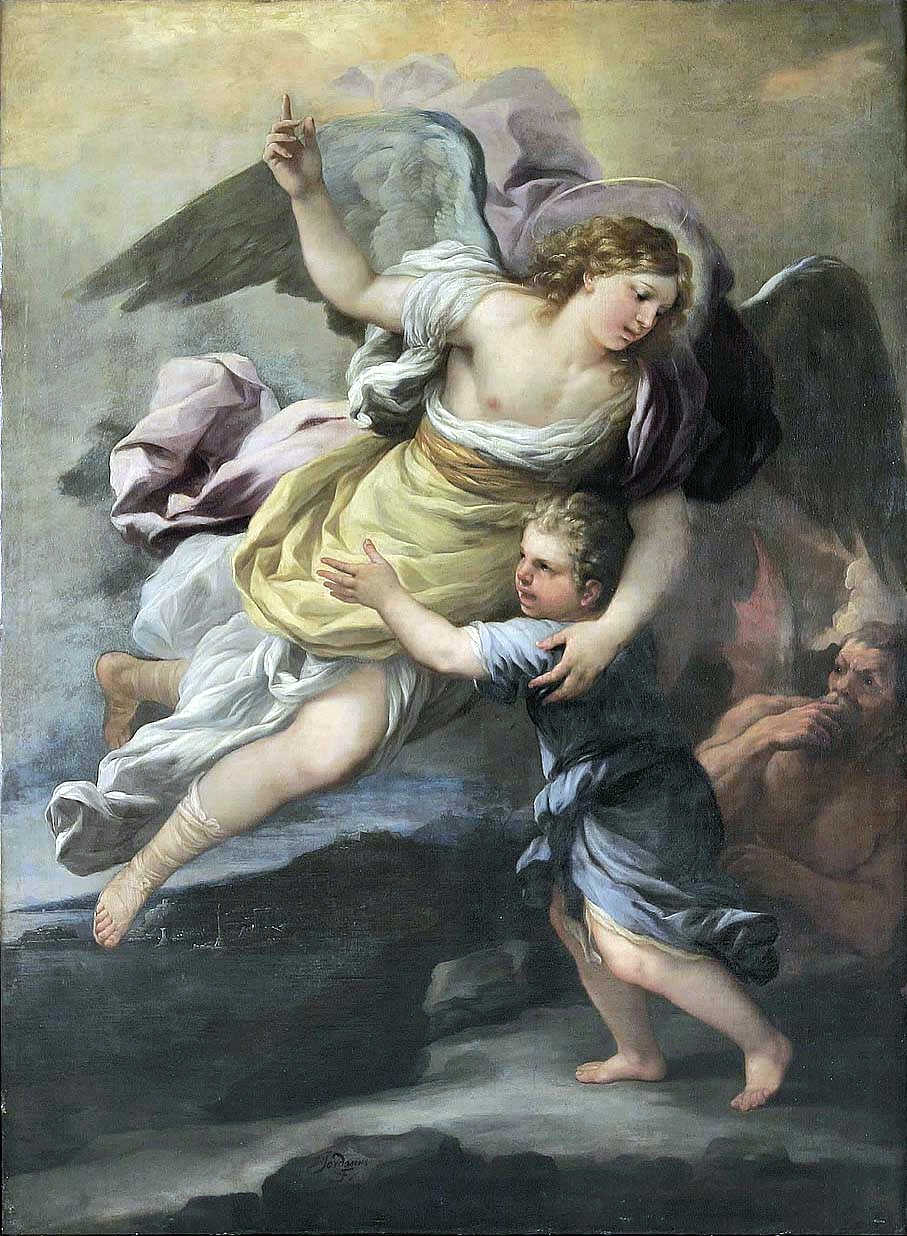
- Ángel de la Guarda
- Observed by: Catholic Church
- Date: 2 October
- Next time: 2 October 2026
- Frequency: annual

The Memorial of the Holy Guardian Angels is a feast of the Catholic Church, observed on 2 October. In some places, the feast is observed on the first Sunday in September with the permission of the Congregation for Divine Worship. Catholics set up altars in honor of the guardian angels as early as the 4th Century, and local celebrations of a feast in honor of the guardian angels go back to the 11th Century. The feast is also observed by some Evangelical Catholic parishes within the Lutheran Churches, as well as by Anglo-Catholics within the Anglican Communion and most churches of the Continuing Anglican movement.

== History ==
Devotion to the angels is an ancient tradition which the Christian Church It began to develop with the birth of the monastic tradition. The feast was first kept by the Order of Friars Minor in 1500. This feast, like many others, was local before it was placed in the General Roman Calendar in 1607 by Pope Paul V. The papal decree establishing the feast was cosigned by Robert Bellarmine, which has led some scholars to speculate that the feast was created under the influence of the Society of Jesus. It was originally ranked as a double, and is believed that the new feast was intended to be a kind of supplement to the Feast of St. Michael and all the angels. Clement X elevated it to the rank of an obligatory double, and, finally, Leo XIII raised the feast to the rank of a double major. Since 1976, it has been ranked an obligatory memorial.

On 2 October, 1795, Pius VI granted a partial indulgence every time, with a contrite heart and devotion, any of the faithful say the Guardian Angel prayer. Pius VI also granted a plenary indulgence on the feast of the Holy Guardian Angels to those who have said the prayer morning and evening throughout the year, provided they meet the other usual requirements of receiving a plenary indulgence (truly penitent confession and reception of the Eucharist, visiting a church or oratory, and praying for the Sovereign Pontiff). On June 11, 1796, Pope Pius VI granted another plenary indulgence to those who have frequently said this prayer at the hour of their death, provided they have the required dispositions. Pope Pius VII confirmed these indulgences of his predecessor again on May 15, 1821, and additionally granted a plenary indulgence once a month, on any day of the month, to those who have prayed the Guardian Angel prayer every day for a month, under the same aforementioned requirements to receive a plenary indulgence. Following the abrogation of these indulgences, a partial indulgence is granted in the 1968 Enchiridion.

John XXIII wrote a meditation for the Feast of the Guardian Angels which states: "We must remember how admirable was the intention of divine Providence in entrusting to the angels the mission of watching over all mankind, and over individual human beings, lest they should fall victims to the grave dangers which they encounter."

== Observance ==
The Feast of the Guardian Angels was of seminal importance to Josemaría Escrivá, who considered himself to have been inspired by God to found Opus Dei on October 2, 1928. The significance of the day of his inspiration was evident to Escrivá, who believed that it was a sign that the work of the Opus would be carried out under the protection of angels.

== See also ==
- Michaelmas
- Angelus
