= Angels in Islam =

Heavenly beings found in the Islamic tradition

Angel in a Persian miniature, in the style of Bukhara, 16th century.

In Islam, angels (Arabic: ملاك٬ ملك, romanized: malāk; plural: ملائِكة, malāʾik/malāʾikah or Persian: فرشته, romanized: ferešte) are believed to be heavenly beings, created from a luminous origin by God. The Quran is the principal source for the Islamic concept of angels, but more extensive features of angels appear in hadith literature, Mi'raj literature, Islamic exegesis, theology, philosophy, and mysticism.

Belief in angels is one of the core tenets within Islam, as it is one of the six articles of faith. Angels are more prominent in Islam compared to Jewish and Christian traditions. The angels differ from other invisible creatures in their attitude as creatures of virtue, in contrast to evil devils (Arabic: شَيَاطِين, romanized: šayāṭīn or Persian: دیو, romanized: dīv) and ambiguous jinn (Arabic: جِنّ or Persian: پَری, romanized: parī). Despite being considered to be virtuous beings, angels are not necessarily bringers of good news, as per Islamic tradition, angels can perform grim and violent tasks.

Angels are conceptualized as heavenly beings. As such, they are said to lack passion and bodily desires. If angels can nevertheless fail, is debated in Islam. Mu'tazilites and many Salafis usually hold the opinion that angels are always obedient and never fail to perform their tasks. In contrast, schools of theology (Kalām) often accept the fallibility of angels. Ashʿarites agree that angels have no free agency, but argue that they may still fail and then fall. Māturīdites say that the heavenly creatures are tested, and angels may fail such a test, whereupon they are dismissed from their duties.

In Islamic philosophy and Sufism, angels are related to the nature of reason (aql). According to Sufi cosmology, they connect the higher realms of the intellect with the lower world of matter. Thus, the human mind is conceptualized to form a connection with the heavenly spheres (malakūt) through such heavenly entities associated with light (nūr). In contrast, the devils attempt to disturb the connection by diverging the mind to the lower spheres, thus associated with fire (nār).

== Etymology ==
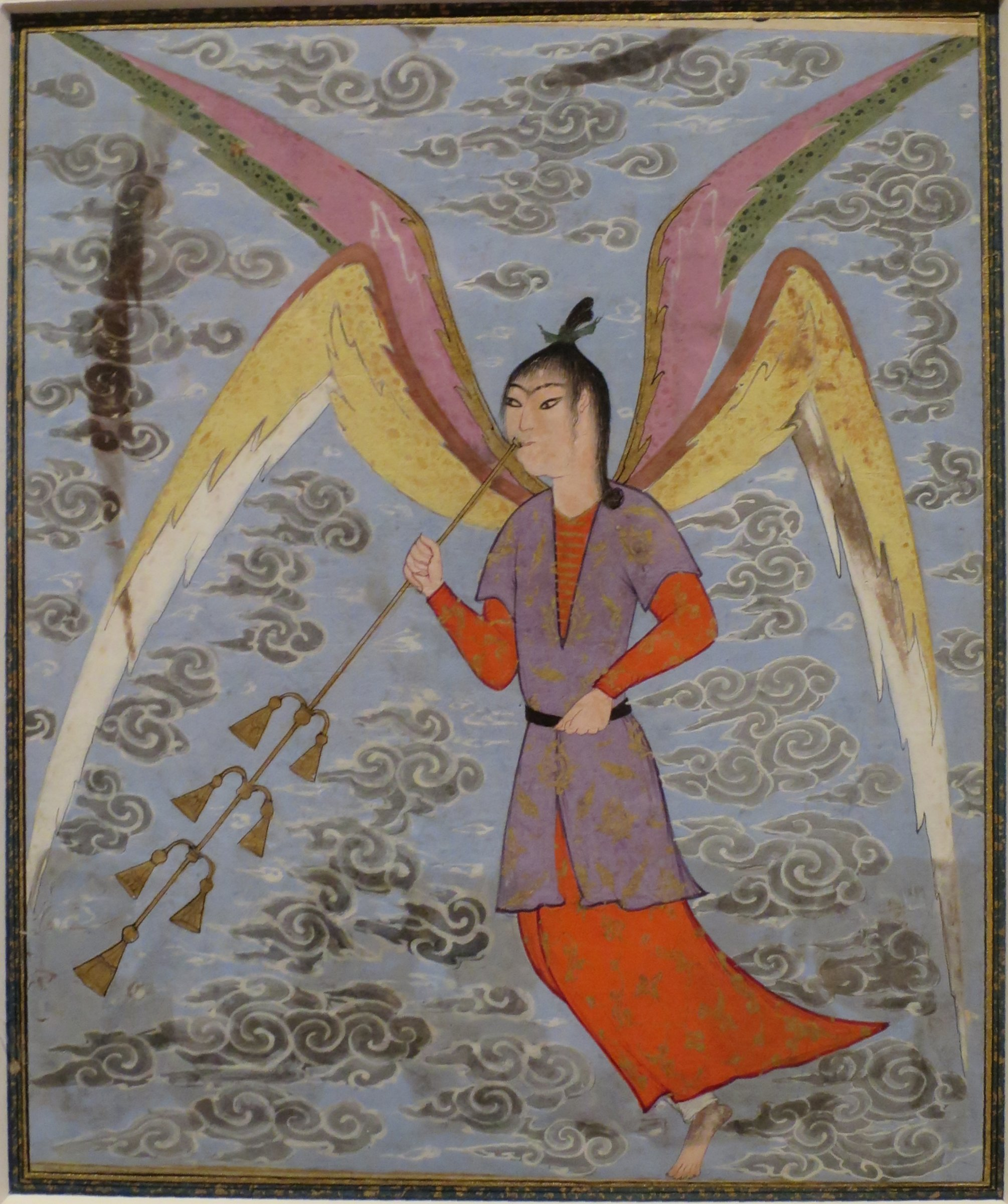
Angel Blowing a Woodwind, ink and opaque watercolor painting from Safavid Iran, c. 1500, Honolulu Academy of Arts.

The Quranic word for angel (Arabic: ملك, romanized: malak) derives either from Malaka, meaning "he controlled", due to their power to govern different affairs assigned to them, or from the triliteral root '-l-k, l-'-k or m-l-k with the broad meaning of a "messenger", just as its counterpart in Hebrew (malʾákh). Unlike the Hebrew word, however, the term is used exclusively for heavenly spirits of the divine world, as opposed to human messengers. The Quran refers to both angelic and human messengers as rasul instead.

In pre-Islamic Arabian culture, the term was also used by the Thamud for beings who deserve supplication.

== Quran and exegesis ==
The Quran describes angels in the context of earlier Middle Eastern cultural traditions, both monotheistic and polytheistic belief-systems. Belief in angels is prescribed for the believer. Surah 35 is, in some manuscripts, named after them (al-malā’ikah). With a few exceptions, angels in the Quran are largely impersonal. They appear in stories about the mythic past, eschatological imagery (heaven/hell), and in discussions about prophecy and worship.

While in the Bible the term 'angel' refers to 'messengers' (mundane or divine) the Quran uses the term 'rasul' instead. Angels are solely heavenly spirits. As in Biblical tradition, angels deliver the message to Zechariah (3:39) and Mary (3:45). In the Quran, angels are not limited to be messengers but are also part of the heavenly council. They serve as scribes (50:17-18), serve as God's warriors (9:26), and carry God's throne. God commands the angels to prostrate themselves before Adam, similar to the Syrian Cave of Treasures.

The Quran portrays the Jahiliyyah as worshipping angels as minor deities (Surah 53:19-22; 6:100; 16:57; 37:149), believed to function as intercessors (Surah 10:18). In the pre-Islamic Arabian religion, deities, jinn, angels, and demons are not clearly distinguished and shade into another. Several angels in the Quran function as personified meteorological phenomena, and may root in polytheistic animistic beliefs.

When God creates Adam, he taught him the names of all things, knowledge the angels lack. Muslim exegetes read this as a demonstration of the a unique capacity (exercise of 'aql) whereas the angels are lacking. As such, angels are no longer objects of deserving worship and also become distinguished from God. According to Quranic exegesis, some angels refused to bow before Adam and became devils (šayāṭīn). This debate is closely related to a discussion regarding other verses about angels.

=== Prostration of angels and obedience ===
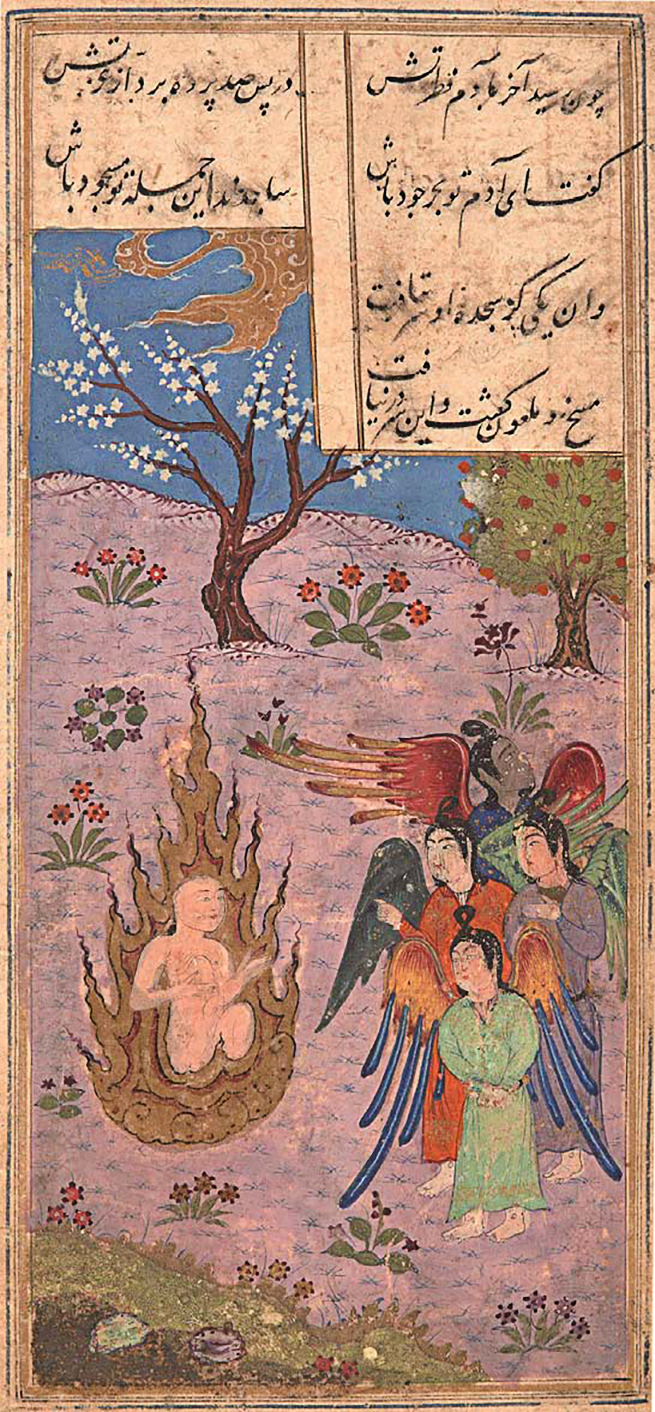
Angels discuss the creation of Adam. Painting from a manuscript of the Manṭiq al-ṭayr (The Conference of the Birds) of Farīd al-Dīn ʿAṭṭār. Iran, Shiraz, 899/1494.

A key event regarding angels in the Quran is the command addressed to the angels to bow before the newly created Adam. According to the Quran, the angels object to the creation of mankind at first, arguing that they commit the sins the jinn committed previously. After the objection of the angels, Adam demonstrates his ability to "name all things" and whereupon all angels bow down, except Iblis.

That Iblis is a fallen angel was widely accepted among Classical scholars of Islam. (Note: "Although it is sometimes denied that Iblis was a fallen-angel, this is fully accepted by the classical commentators, e.g., Baydawi, I:51; see also Tabari, 1961 I:83.)) Objection towards the concept of fallen angels, however, is attested as early as to the influential Hasan of Basra (d. 728), who is often considered one of the first who asserted the doctrine of angelic infallibility and he rejected that Iblis was an angel. While the arguments existed early on, opposition to fallen angels was not universal in early Islam, as Tabari (839–923 CE), for example, does not mention angelic infallibility, when discussing the nature of Iblis. The traditions of ibn Abbas (angels can sin), and Hasan of Basra (angels cannot sin), reflect two different interpretations of the Islamic conceptualization of angels.

Bulak al-Djurdjani opposes the ‘iṣmah (infallibility) of angels on the ground that the protest of the angels proves inevitably potential flaws in their character, such as slander, pride, malice, and finding fault with God. In a comment by Gibril Haddad on Qadi Baydawi's defense on angelic fallibility, in his Tafsir al-Baydawi, it is said that the angels' "obedience is their nature while their disobedience is a burden, while human beings' obedience is a burden and their hankering after lust is their nature."

==== Infallible ====
Opposition to the concept of the fallen angel is mostly found among the Qadariyah and most Mu'tazilites. Many Salafis also agree with this view. Those who oppose angelic fallibility refer to Surah at-Tahrim (66:6) in favor of their position:

O believers! Protect yourselves and your families from a Fire whose fuel is people and stones, overseen by formidable and severe angels, who never disobey whatever Allah orders—always doing as commanded.

Fakhr al-Din al-Razi is an exception to most Sunni mutakallimūn, and agrees that angels are free from any form of sin and includes angelic infallibility to the six articles of faith. Al-Razi argues that "except Iblis" (2:34, 18:50) is read as an "interrupted exception" (istithna munqathi), excluding Iblis from the group of angels and states that he hailed from jinn species instead. Ibn Taimiyya rejects any ambiguity on the nature of Iblis and portrays him as a satanic jinni in contrast to the obedient angels. Following the opinions of ibn Taimiyya and his disciple ibn Kathir, many scholars of Salafism and Wahhabism agree on this. Furthermore, many of them regard this as a major difference between Christianity and Islam.

A possible reconciliation of Iblis' fall and the doctrine of angelic impeccability is to say that God wanted Iblis to disobey or that Iblis' disobedience derives from a noble yet misguided motivation. Mahmud al-Alusi resolves potential conflicts by iterating that ʿAzāzīl was first an infallible angel, but then God removed his angelic nature and replaced it with satanic attributes, whereupon he becomes Iblis and sinned.

==== Fallible ====
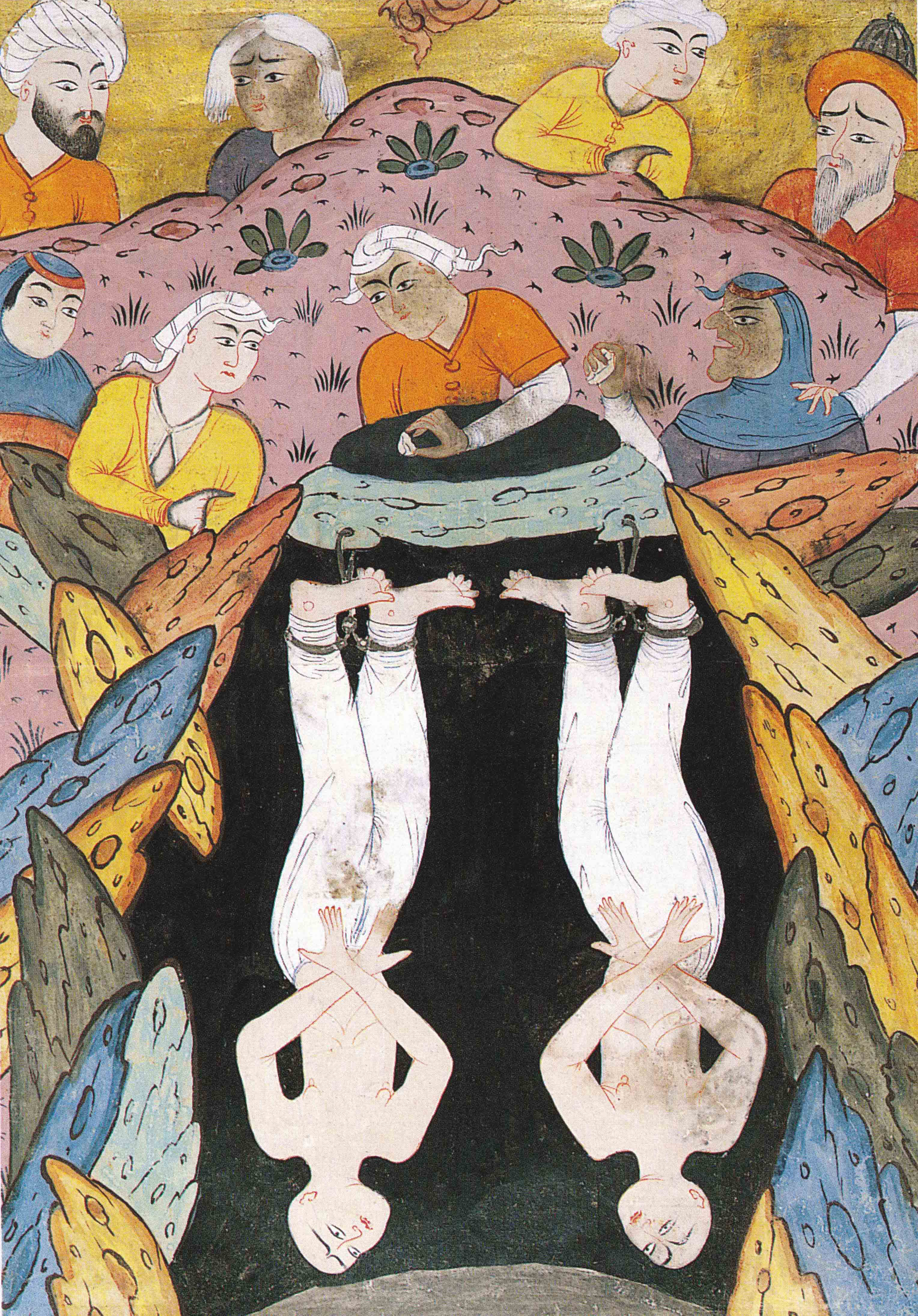
The angels Harut and Marut punished by hanging over the well, condemned to teach sorcery. (c. 1703)

According to those who accept the concept of fallen angels, the phrase "except Iblis" in 2:34 and 18:50 is understood as an uninterrupted exception (istithna' muttasil). Therefore, Iblis is an exception from within number of angel and thus an angel himself.

According to a number of traditional exegetes, God's command to bow before Adam is meant to test the angels. Al-Maturidi (853–944 CE) explains the test of the angels as follows and also suggests that they have free-will based on the Quran:

By calling the stars adornment of the heavens, we can deduce another meaning: that is, the inhabitants of the heavens themselves are put to the test to see which of them is the best in deeds, (...)

Those who are in support of the concept of fallen angels (including Tabari, Suyuti, al-Nasafi, and al-Māturīdī) refer to al-Anbiya (21:29) stating that angels would be punished for sins and arguing that, if angels could not sin, they would not be warned to refrain from committing them:

Whoever of them were to say, "I am a god besides Him", they would be rewarded with Hell by Us [...]

Besides the case of Iblis, the presence of Harut and Marut in the Quran, further hindered their complete absolution from potentially sinning. Ahmad ibn Hanbal (d. 241/855) describes these angels, in his Musnad, as boasting of their obedience, so God sends them down to earth, where they commit sins. Although not explicit in the Quran, some exegetes linked them to Iblis, and the angels with him, protesting the creation of Adam.

The angels in the Quran are tested. As the inhabitants of heaven, they believed to be superior to humans and jinn, who only inhabit the earth. Yet, by commanding them to bow before Adam, the humility of the angels was tested:

ظنوا أنهم أكرم الخلق على الله، وأَنه لا يُفَضِّل أَحداً عليهم.

ومنهم من يقول: ظنوا أَنهم أعلم من جميع من يخلق من جوهر النار أَو التراب؛ من حيث ذكرت من جوهرهم، أَو لعظم عبادتهم لله، وعلمهم بأَن في الجن والإِنس عصاة؛ فلهذا امتحنهم بالعلم، ثم بالسجود؛ لإظهار علو البشر وشرفه، وعظم ما أكرموا به من العلم.

They thought they were the most honored of God's creation, and that He favored no one over them.

Some say they thought they were more knowledgeable than all those created from the essence of fire or dust, either because of their inherent nature, or because of their great devotion to God and their knowledge that there are sinners among both jinn and humankind. Therefore, He tested them with knowledge, and then with prostration, to demonstrate the superiority and honor of humankind, and the greatness of the knowledge with which they were honored.

Imam Maturidi argues, that if angels could not sin, angels could also not be good, since moral goodness implies the possibility for evil. The sin of angels derive from their cognition and mental states, not from sensual temptations. As celestial beings, angels are free from the latter but subject to potential errors of the former.

== Characteristics ==
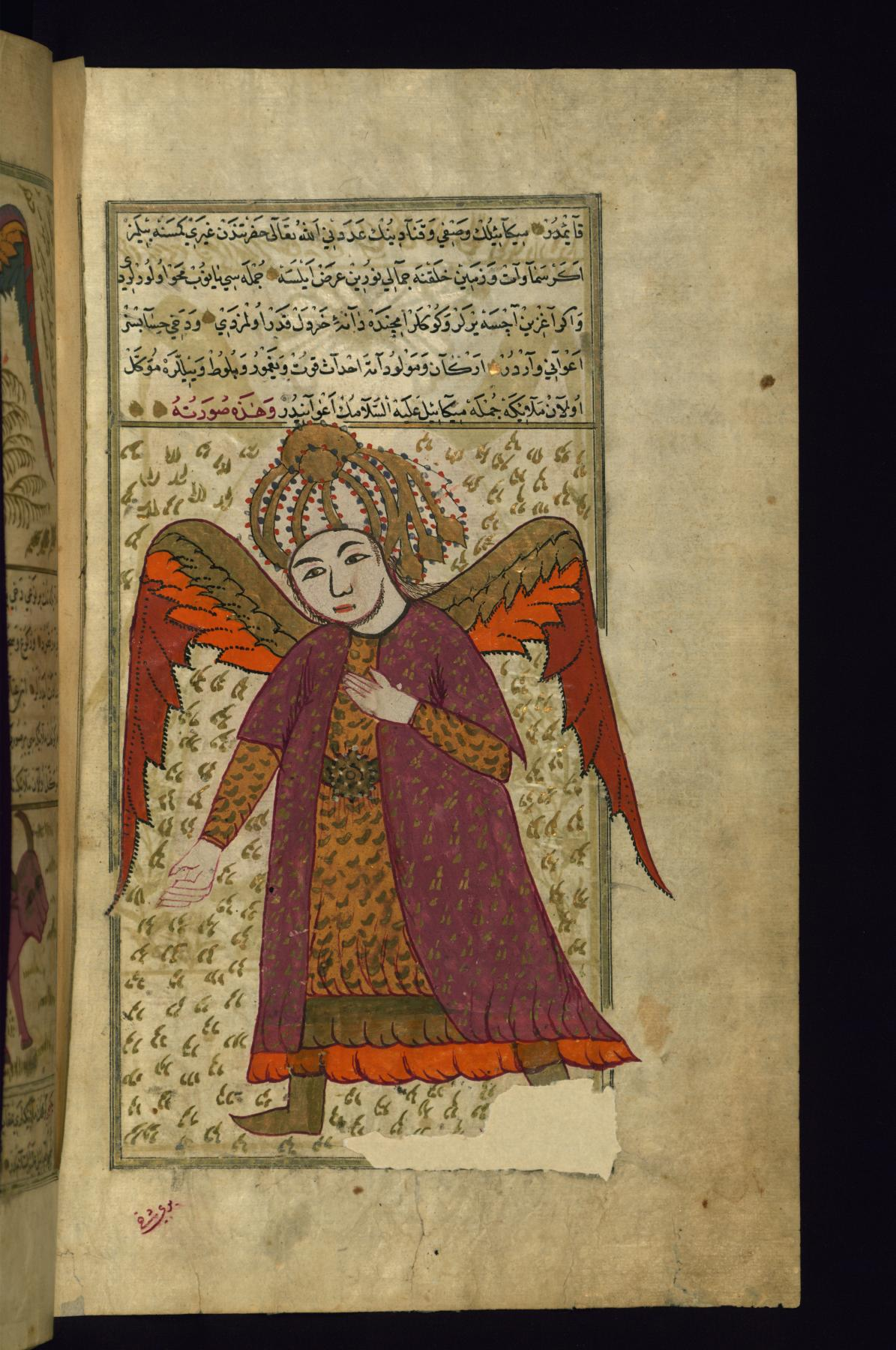
Illustration by Zakariya al-Qazwini depicting the Archangel Michael (Mika'il)

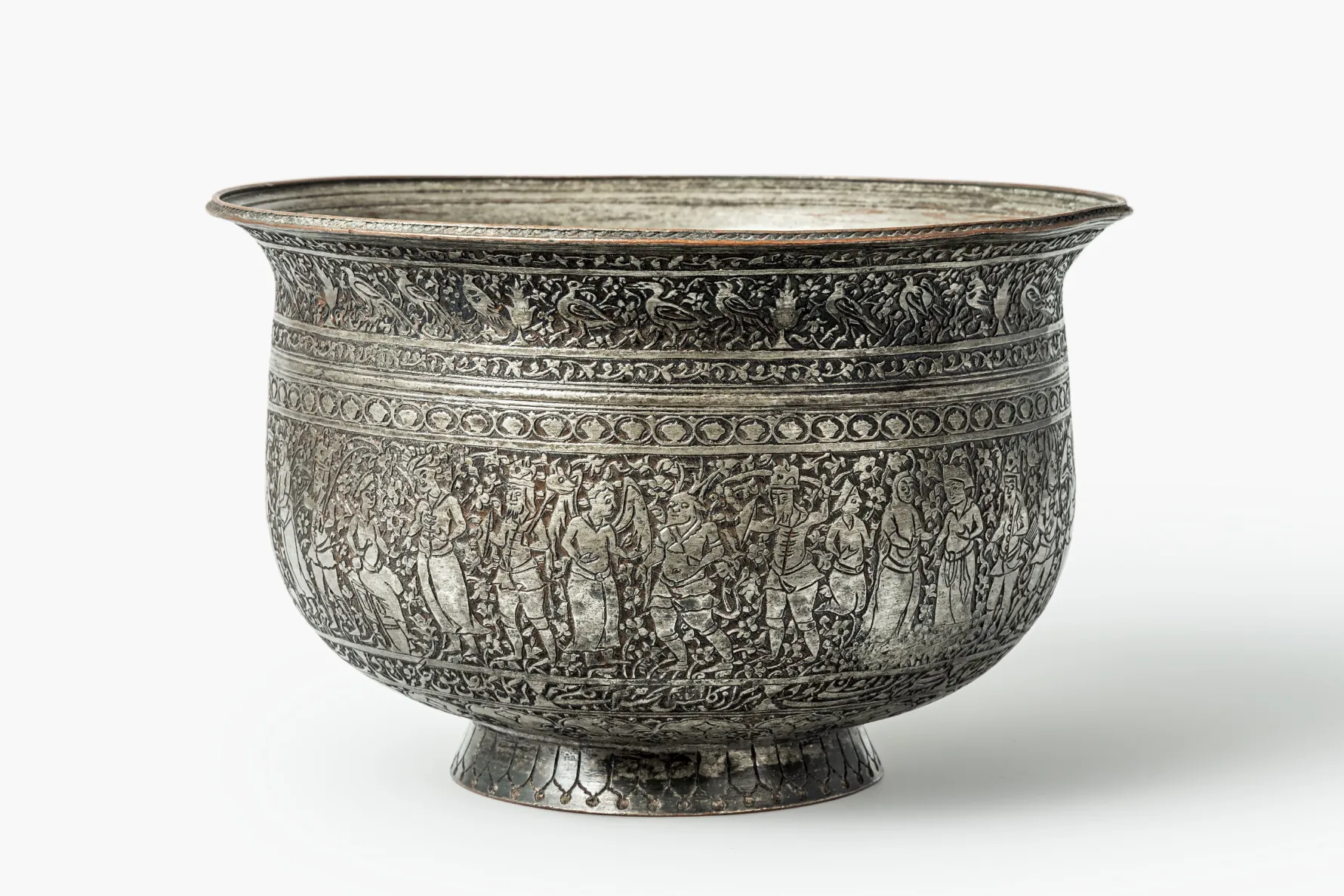
Bowl with humans, angels, and divs (demons). Iran Qajar dynasty, 1215-1221 A.H. (1800-1805). Museum für Kunst und Gewerbe Hamburg, Germany. This bowl depicts humans, angels, and horned demons.

In Islam, angels are heavenly creatures created by God. They are considered older than humans and jinn. They are aware of the thoughts of humans. However, they do not know the future. Although Muslim authors disagree on the exact nature of angels, they agree that they are autonomous entities with subtle bodies. Yet, both concepts of angels as anthropomorphic creatures with wings and as abstract forces are acknowledged. Angels play an important role in Muslim everyday life by protecting the believers from evil influences and recording the deeds of humans. They have different duties, including their praise of God, interacting with humans in ordinary life, defending against devils (shayāṭīn) and carrying on natural phenomena.

In Islamic philosophy angelic qualities, just as devilish ones, are assumed to be part of a human's nature, the angelic ones related to the spirit (ruh) and reason (aql), while the devilish ones to egotism. Angels might accompany aspiring saints or advise pious humans. Angels are defined as beings endowed with reason and immortality, while devils are defined as beings without reason but still immortal. Humans are defined by having reason but are mortals while animals are unreasonable and mortal.

One of the major characteristics in Islam is their lack of bodily desires: they are sleepless, do not eat or drink, and have no anger. Various Islamic scholars such as Ibn Kathir, Ibn Taymiyya, Al-Tabari, Fakhr al-Din al-Razi, and Umar Sulaiman Al-Ashqar have also quoted that angels do not need to consume food or drinks. They are also described as immortal, unlike jinn, and as being created from incorporeal light (Nūr) or fire (Nar). (Note: Differences between nūr and nar have been debated in Islam. In Arabic, both terms are closely related morphologically and phonetically. Baydawi explains that the term light serves only as a proverb, but fire and light refers actually to the same substance. Apart from light, other traditions also mention exceptions about angels created from fire, ice or water. Tabari argued that both can be seen as the same substance, since both pass into each other but refer to the same thing on different degrees. Asserting that both fire and light are actually the same but on different degrees can also be found by Qazwini and Ibishi. In his work Al-Hay'a as-samya fi l-hay'a as-sunmya, Suyuti asserts that the angels are created from "fire that eats, but does not drink". Abd al-Ghani al-Maqdisi argued that only the angels of mercy are created from light, but angels of punishment have been created from fire.) Ahmad Sirhindi, a 17th-century Indian scholar, has added, that angels can take various shapes.

Angels believed to be engaged in human affairs are closely related to Islamic purity and modesty rituals. Angels may descend to the believers, such as during the Night of Qadr. Many hadiths, including Muwatta Imam Malik from one of the Kutub al-Sittah, talk about angels being repelled by humans' state of impurity. It is argued that if driven away by ritual impurity, the Kiraman Katibin, who record people's actions, and the guardian angel, will not perform their tasks assigned to the individual. Another hadith specifies, during the state of impurity, bad actions are still written down, but good actions are not.

When a person tells a lie, angels nearby are separated from the person by the stench the lie emanates. Angels also depart from humans when they are naked or are having a bath out of decency, but also curse people who are nude in public. Ahmad Sirhindi has mentioned that the angels' nobility is because they are created from light.

=== Sufism ===
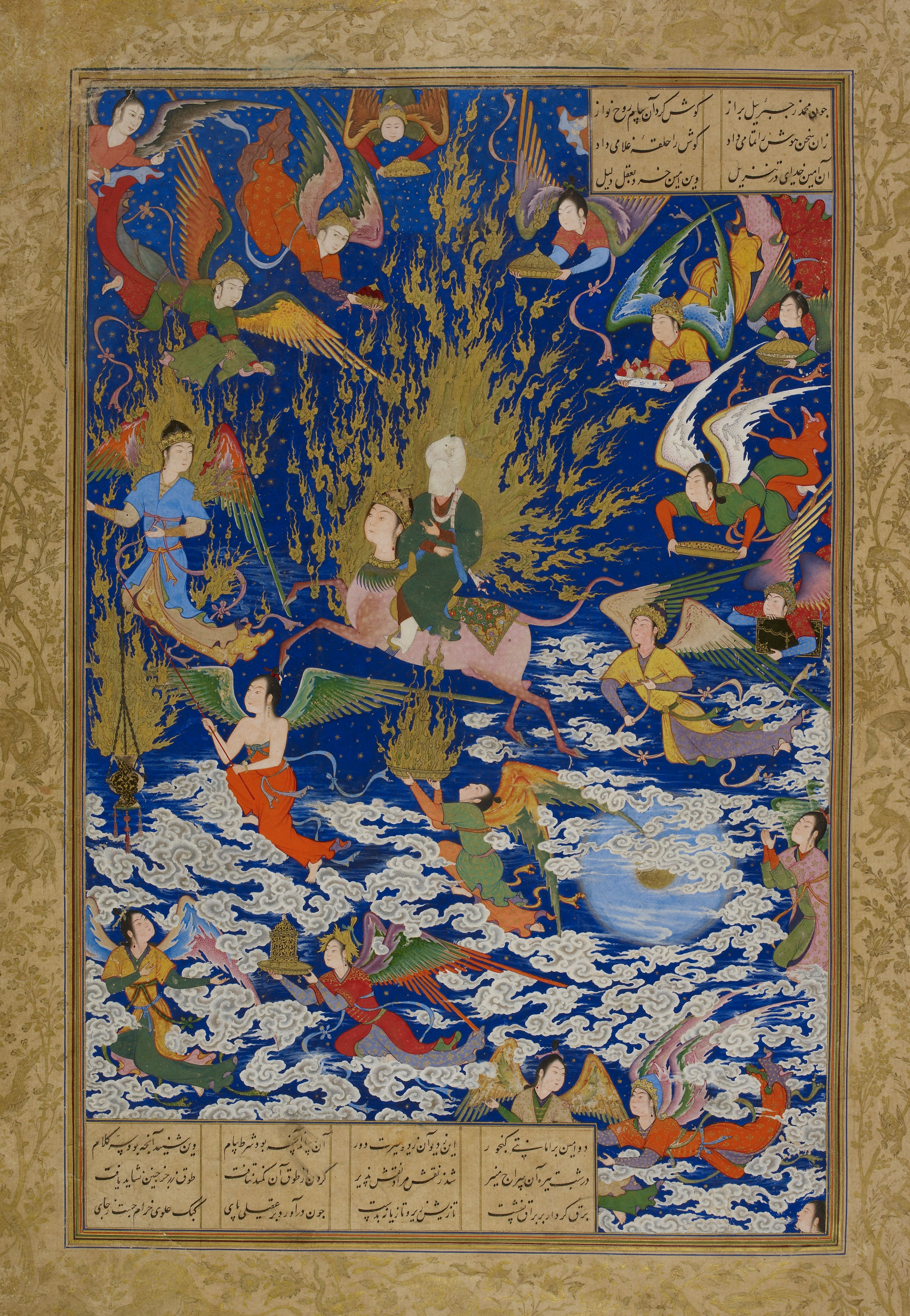
1543 illustration of the Mi'raj from an edition of the Khamsa of Nizami Ganjavi created for Shah Tahmasp I

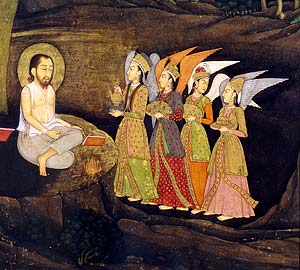
A miniature depicting the Darvīsh Sultan Ibrahim ibn Adham of Balkh visited by angels, 1760–70. Opaque watercolor with gold on paper, Cynthia Hazen Polsky Collection (1009-IP)

In Sufism, angels do not appear merely as models for the mystic but also their companions. Humans, in a state between earth and heaven, seek angels as guidance to reach the upper realms. Some authors have suggested that some individual angels in the microcosmos represent specific human faculties on a macrocosmic level. According to a common belief, if a Sufi can not find a sheikh to teach him, he will be taught by the angel Khidr. The presence of an angel depends on a human's obedience to divine law. Dirt, depraved morality and desecration may ward off an angel. A saint might be given the ability to see angels as gift (karāmāt) from God.

Ahmad al-Tijani, founder of the Tijaniyyah order, narrates that angels are created through the words of humans. Through good words an angel of mercy is created, but through evil words an angel of punishment is created. By God's decree, if someone repents from evil words, the angel of punishment may turn into an angel of mercy.

Just as in non-Sufi-related traditions, angels are thought of as created of light. Al-Jili specifies that the angels are created from the Light of Muhammad and in his attribute of guidance, light and beauty. Influenced by Ibn Arabi's Sufi metaphysics, Haydar Amuli identifies angels as created to represent different names/attributes of God's beauty, while the devils are created in accordance with God's attributes of Majesty, such as "The Haughty" or "The Domineering".

Andalusian scholar ibn Arabi argues that a human generally ranks below angels, but developed to al-Insān al-Kāmil, ranks above them. While most earlier Sufis (like Hasan al-Basri) advised their disciples to imitate the angels, Ibn-Arabi advised them to surpass the angels. The angels being merely a reflection of the Divine Names in accordance within the spiritual realm, humans experience the Names of God manifested both in the spiritual and in the material world. This reflects the major opinion that prophets and messengers among humans rank above angels, but the ordinary human below an angel, while the messengers among angels rank higher than prophets and messengers among humans. Ibn Arabi elaborates his ranking in al-Futuhat based on a report by Tirmidhi. Accordingly, Muhammad intercedes for the angels first, then for (other) prophets, saints, believers, animals, plants and inanimate objects last, this explaining the hierarchy of beings in general Muslim thought.

=== Philosophy (Falsafa) ===
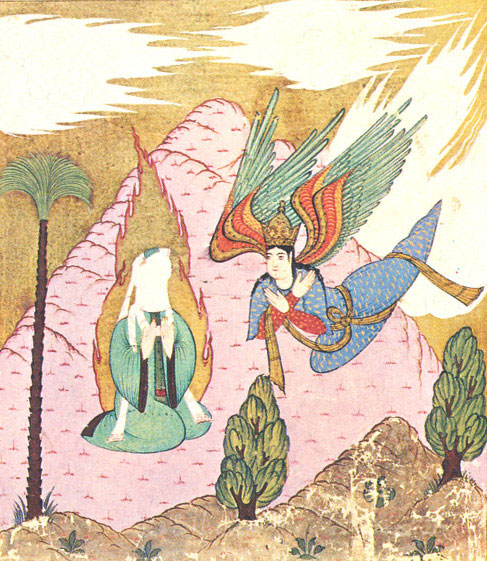
A 16th-century Siyer-i Nebi image of angel Gabriel visiting Muhammad

As evident from the translation of the Isagoge, Muslim philosophers substituted the 'gods' (theos) of Greek philosophy for angels and integrated them into an Islamic understanding of cosmic causality. Muslim philosophers, such as al-Fārābī and Ibn Sīnā, drew from Aristotelianism and Neo-Platonism a hierarchy of causal effects. God created the divine Intellect known from Aristotelian cosmology and the writings of Plotinus, identified with an angel (usually Gabriel). The archangel then influences other cosmic intellects who in turn influence the sublunary world. As such, the philosophers considered angels to be bodiless spirits.

Muslim theologians (mutakallimun), for example al-Suyuti and al-Taftazani, generally rejected the philosophical depiction of angels as immaterial beings, since angels are, according to ḥadīṯ, created from light (nūr). In response to the invisibility of angels, Taftazani argues that only God is immaterial and that angels evade perception due to their transparent bodies. Although Mutazilites and Asharites agree upon that everything in the world is bound to matter, including angels and demons, they disagree on the nature of their bodies: While for the Mutazilites angels were luminous, the Asharites maintained that their bodies are airy and could condense in order to interact with the physical world (i.e. becoming visible, fighting in battle, destroying a city, etc.)

The influential Sunni Muslim author al-Ghazali (c. 1058–19 December 1111) reconciled the Islamic Neo-Platonist with traditional Sunni interpretations. He divides human nature into four domains, each representing another type of creature: animals, beasts, devils and angels. The spiritual components are related to the mental domain (malakut), the plane in which symbols take on form, angels and devils advise the human heart (qalb). However, the angels also inhabit the realm beyond, considered the realm from which reason ('aql) derives from and devils have no place.

While the angels endow the human mind with reason, advice, virtues and lead to worshipping God, the devil perverts the mind and tempts to abusing the spiritual nature by committing sins, such as lying, betrayal, and deceit. The angelic natures advises how to use the animalistic body properly, while the devil perverts it. In this regard, the plane of a human is, unlike those of the jinn (here: angels and devils) and animals, not pre-determined. Humans are potentially both angels and devils, depending on whether the sensual soul or the rational soul develop.

=== Bektashi Alevism ===
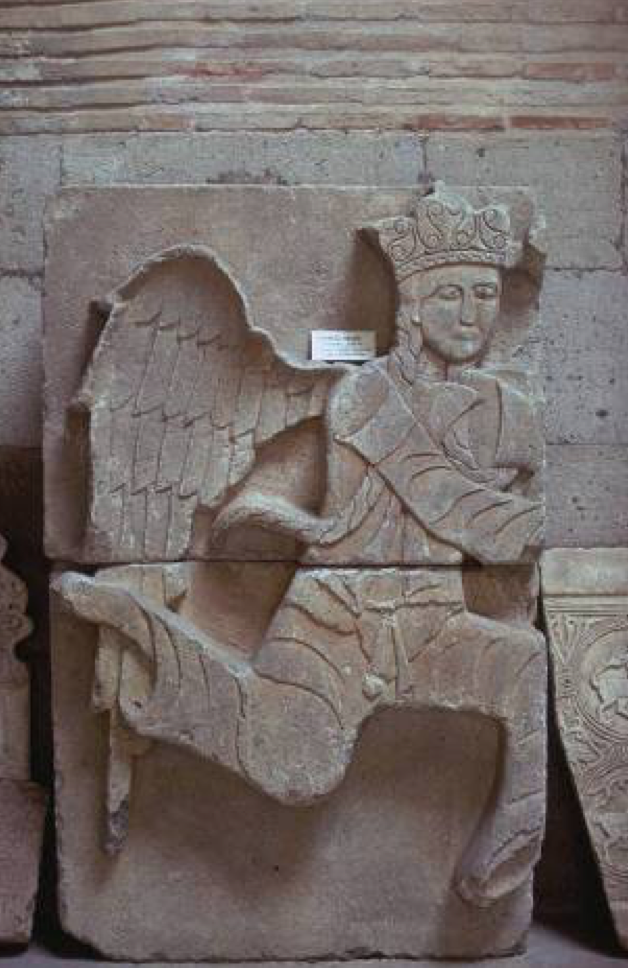
Fragments of Konya city walls, c. 1220–1221.

Despite its heterodoxy, Alevis believe in the Quran, the revelation by Muhammad, the afterlife, and angels, pretty much as Sunnis do. Like orthodox Muslims, Alevis believe that Muhammad undertook the heavenly journey guided by the angel Gabriel (Turkish: Cebrâil), mentioned in the Quran (Surah 17), as evident from the miraçlama, a form of poetry (deyiş) remniscient of Anatolian folk songs. Alevis affirm the Quranic message that angels were ordered to bow down before Adam, and for that reason, believe that humans inherent a special status. Some Alevis believe that good and bad angels are merely symbols and do not believe in their literal existence.

Angels are also mentioned in Alevi-spiritual literature. The cosmology outlined in the Buyruks ascribes a central role to angels. Accordingly, when God created the angels, God tested them by asking who they are. Those angels who responded "You are the Creator and I am the created." were the good angels, while those who claimed independency by stating "You are you; I am I" were burned. Whereby, the destroyed angels feature as an example of spiritual ignorance. Similar to the Quran, the story continues with that the angel Azâzîl, overcome by his ego, refuses to bow before the light, arguing that the light is a created thing and thus, cannot be the creator, and accordingly unworthy of prostration. In contrast to Sunni tradition however, the light symbolizes Ali and Muhammad, not Adam. Besides Gabriel and Azazil, other angels, such as the Kiraman Katibin also appear in the text.

=== Contemporary views ===
Islamic Modernist scholars, eager to promote Islam as a "science-friendly and rational religion, devoid of any supernatural elements", attempted to interprete supernatural forces, such as angels, as natural forces or moral manifestations of the heart without any external reality. Muhammad Abduh, Rashid Rida, Muhammad Asad and Ghulam Ahmed Parwez have thus suggested a metaphorical reinterpretation of the concept of angels.

Orthodox forms of Islam, on the other hand, emphasizes a literal interpretation of angels, as recently affirmed by a fatwa from al-Azhar University. Wahhabism and Salafism, also considers metaphorical interpretation as a form of unbelief or illicit innovation (bidʿah), brought by secularism and positivism, as stated by Muhammad ibn al-Uthaymin.

In contrast to traditional orthodox accounts, many Salafis, such as members of the Muslim Brotherhood Sayyid Qutb and Umar Sulaiman al-Ashqar, differ by also disregarding material previously well-accepted in Islamic tradition, such as the story of Harut and Marut (qiṣṣat Hārūt wa-Mārūt) or the name the Angel of Death (ʿAzrāʾīl). Al-Ashqar not only rejects the traditional material itself, he furthermore disapproves of scholars who use them.

== Classification of angels ==
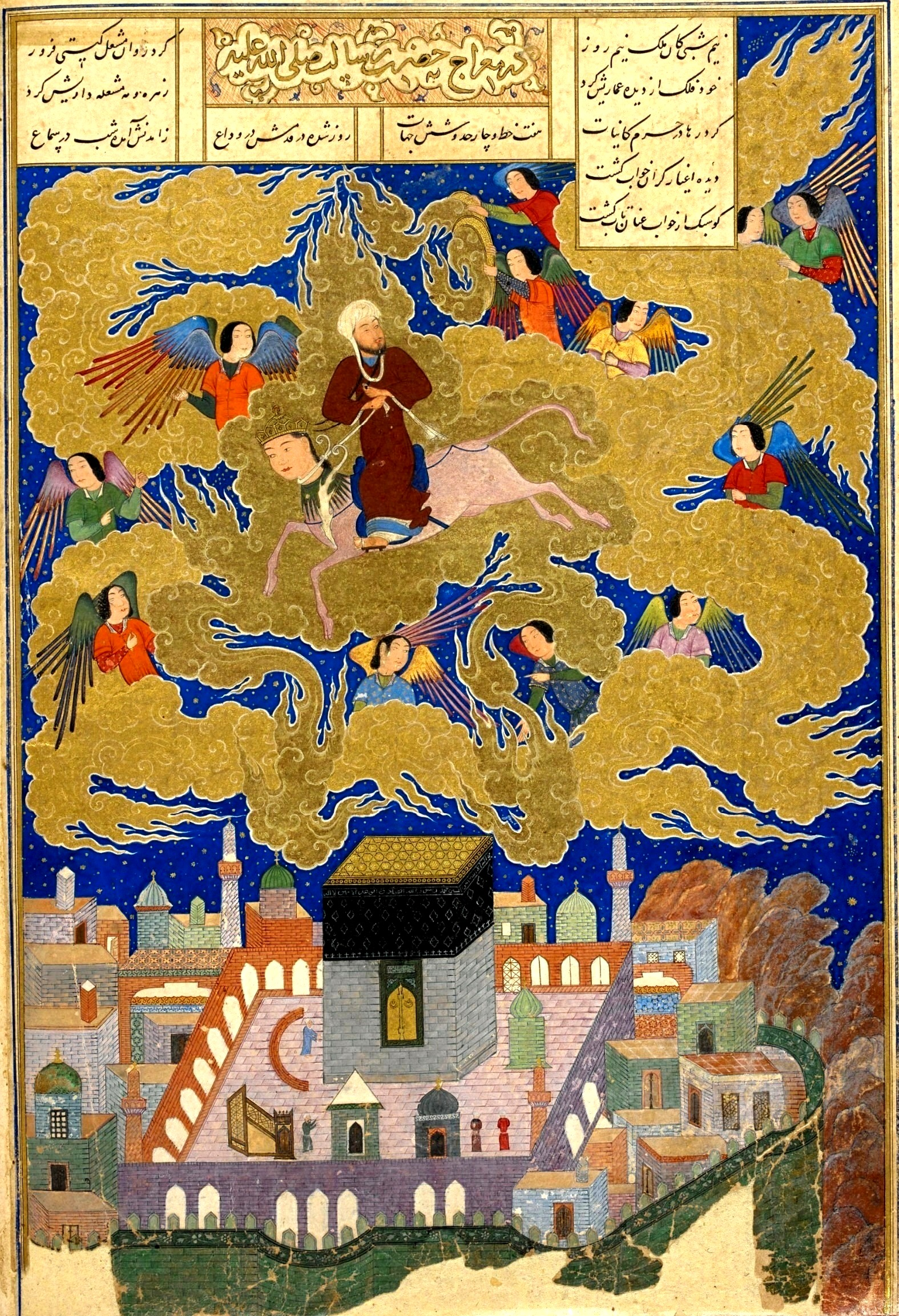
Muhammad and the Angel Gabriel by Abd al-Razzak

Islam has no standard hierarchical organization that parallels the division into different "choirs" or spheres hypothesized and drafted by early medieval Christian theologians, but generally distinguishes between the angels in heaven (karubiyin) fully absorbed in the ma'rifa (knowledge) of God and the messengers (rasūl) who carry out divine decrees between heaven and earth. Others add a third group of angels, and categorize angels into İlliyyûn Mukarrebûn (those around God's throne), Mudabbirât (carrying the laws of nature), and Rasūl (messengers). Since angels are not equal in status and are consequently delegated to different tasks to perform, some authors of tafsir (mufassirūn) divided angels into different categories.

Al-Baydawi records that Muslim scholars divide angels in at least two groups: those who are self-immersed in knowledge of "the Truth" (al-Haqq), based on "they laud night and day, they never wane" (21:20), they are the "highmost" and "angels brought near" and those who are the executors of commands, based on "they do not disobey Allah in what He commanded them but they do what they are commanded" (66:6), who are the administers of the command of heaven to earth.

Fakhr al-Din al-Razi (d. 1209) divided the angels into eight groups, which shows some resemblance to Christian angelology:

- Hamalat al-'Arsh, those who carry the 'Arsh (Throne of God), comparable to the Christian Seraphim.
- Muqarrabun (Cherubim), who surround the throne of God, constantly praising God (tasbīḥ)
- Archangels, such as Jibrāʾīl, Mīkhāʾīl, Isrāfīl, and ʿAzrāʾīl
- Angels of Paradise, such as Riḍwān.
- Angels of Hell, Mālik and Zabānīya
- Guardian angels, who are assigned to individuals to protect them
- The angels who record the actions of people
- Angels entrusted with the affairs of the world, like the angel of thunder.

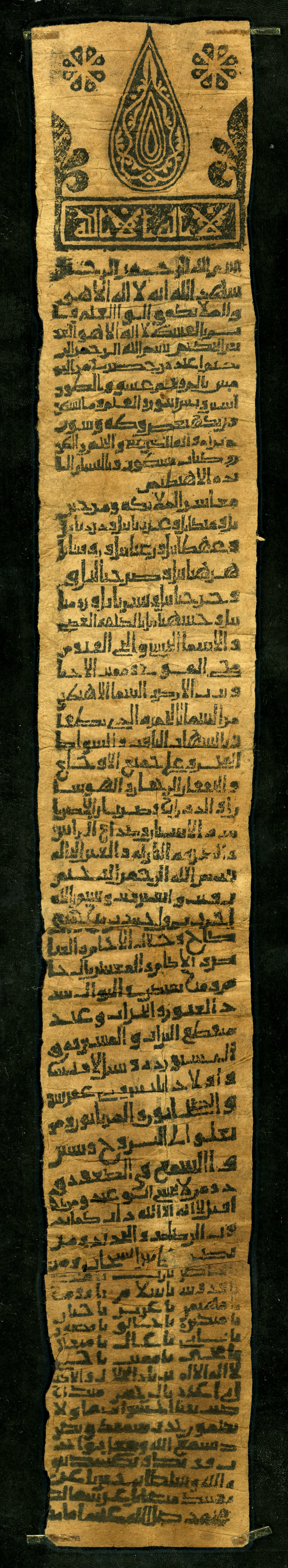
A 13-14th Arabic block printed amulet to dispel pains and headaches. Contains an invocation to several angels, some are known and attested in Shams al-Ma'arif others seem to be invented: Gabriel, Michael, 'Azrā'īl, Dardiyā'īl, 'Ahṭā'īl, Ru'bā'īl, Rūqiyā'īl, Hizzuhyā'īl, Ṣarraḥyā'īl, Jaraḥyā'īl, Satriyā'īl, Radmiyā'īl, Khushuyā'īl

== Angels in Islamic art ==
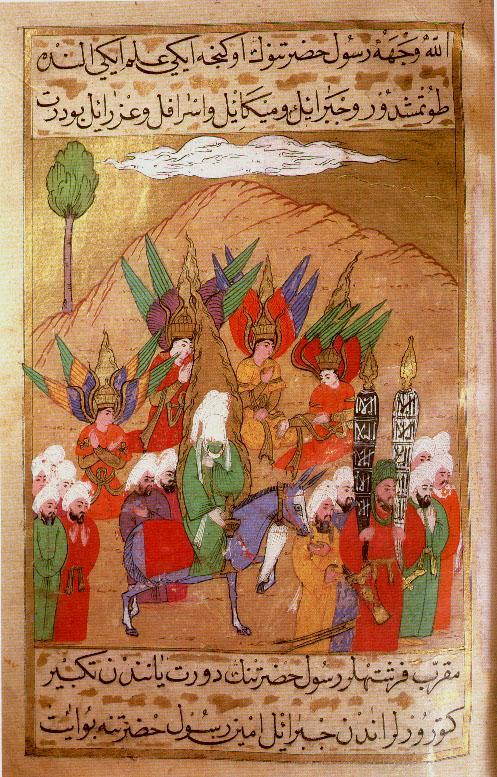
Muhammad advancing on Mecca, with the angels Gabriel, Michael, Israfil and the Angel of death. (Siyer-i Nebi, 16th century)

Angels in Islamic art often appear in illustrated manuscripts of Muhammad's life. Other common depictions of angels in Islamic art include angels with Adam and Eve in the garden of Eden, angels discerning the saved from the damned on the Day of Judgement, and angels as a repeating motif in borders or textiles. Islamic depictions of angels resemble winged Christian angels, although Islamic angels are typically shown with multicolored wings. Angels, such as the archangel Gabriel, are typically depicted as masculine, which is consistent with God's rejection of feminine depictions of angels in several verses of Quran. Nevertheless, later depictions of angels in Islamic art are more feminine and androgynous.

The 13th century book Ajā'ib al-makhlūqāt wa gharā'ib al-mawjūdāt (The Wonders of Creation) by Zakariya al-Qazwini describes Islamic angelology, and is often illustrated with many images of angels. The angels are typically depicted with bright, vivid colors, giving them unusual liveliness and other-worldly translucence. While some angels are referred to as "Guardians of the Kingdom of God," others are associated with hell. An undated manuscript of The Wonders of Creation from the Bavarian State Library in Munich includes depictions of angels both alone and alongside humans and animals. Angels are also illustrated in Timurid and Ottoman manuscripts, such as The Timurid Book of the Prophet Muhammad's Ascension (Mir'ajnama) and the Siyer-i Nebi.

== See also ==
- Angels in art
- Angels in Judaism
- List of theological angels
- List of theological demons
- Peri
