= Al-Infitar =

82nd chapter of the Qur'an

Surah 82 of the Quran
الانفطار Al-Infiṭār The Cleaving
- Qira'ah; English text
- Classification: Meccan
- Other names: The Bursting Apart, The Cleaving Asunder, The Shattering, The Splitting, The Cataclysm
- Position: Juzʼ 30
- No. of verses: 19
- No. of words: 81
- No. of letters: 334

The Cleaving in Sunder (Arabic: الانفطار, al-infiṭār, also known as "The Cleaving" and "Bursting Apart") is the 82nd sura of the Quran, with 19 ayat. The chapter is named 'Al-Infitar' because of the occurrence of the word 'unfatarat' in the first verse of this chapter. Infitar means 'split asunder': the word 'Unfatarat' is used in this chapter in order to describe the splitting of the sky on the day of Judgment. This chapter (Al-Infitar), along with chapters At-Takwir and Al-Inshiqaq, provides an exhaustive description about the 'Day of Judgment'.

== Summary ==
- 1-5 Signs of the Judgement Day
- 6-9 Astonishing unbelief of man in his Creator
- 10-12 Guardian angels record the deeds of men
- 13-16 In the judgment the righteous shall be rewarded and the wicked punished
- 17-19 On the day of judgment there shall be no intercessor except by Allah's leave

== Hadith ==
- Imam Ahmad recorded from Ibn Umar that the Messenger of Allah said: "Whoever wishes to look at the Day of Resurrection, as if he is seeing it with this eye, then let him recite: 'When the sun Kuwwirat' (At-Takwir) and 'When the heaven is cleft sunder (Al-Infitar) and 'When the heaven is split asunder (Al-Inshiqaq)'."
- It was narrated that Jabir said: "Muadh stood up and prayed Isha', and made it lengthy. The Prophet (ﷺ) said: 'Do you want to cause hardship to the people, O Mu'adh; do you want to cause hardship to the people O Mu'adh? Why didn't you recite 'Glorify the Name of your Lord Most High' (Al-Ala or Ad-Dhuha) or 'When the heaven is cleft asunder' (Al-Infitar)?"
