= Umar Sulaiman Al-Ashqar =

Jordanian Muslim scholar and Salafist preacher (1940–2012)

Umar al-Ashqar
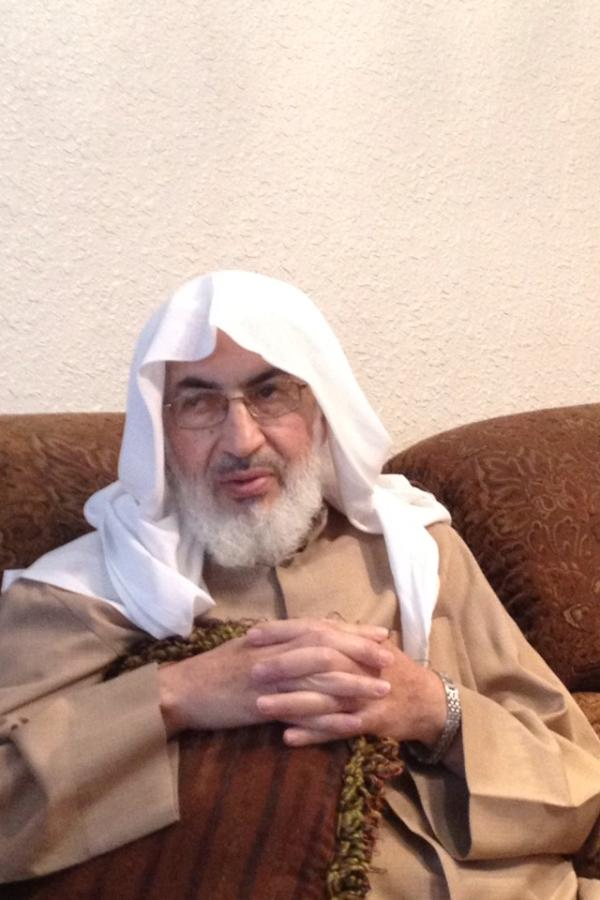

Personal life
- Born: 1940 Nablus, Mandatory Palestine
- Died: 10 August 2012 (aged 71–72)
- Education: Al-Azhar University

Religious life
- Religion: Islam
- Denomination: Salafism

Umar bin Sulaiman Al-Ashqar (Arabic: عمر بن سليمان الاشقر; 1940 – 10 August 2012) was a Salafi scholar associated with the Muslim Brotherhood. He authored several books about matters on Islamic creed.

== Biography ==
Sulaiman Al-Ashqar was born 1940 in Palestine. He was a descendant from a family known for Islamic scholars and authors in Kuwait and later Jordan. He was one of the most influential writers in Jordan, where he also served as a professor in the Faculty of Islamic Law at the University of Jordan and the Dean of the Faculty of Islamic Law at Zarqa University. Before his expulsion from Saudi Arabia in the sixties, he was a disciple of Ibn Baz. After his expulsion from Saudi Arabia, he worked in Kuwait and earned a doctorate at the Al-Azhar University.

== Creed and theology ==
=== Publications ===
He authored a number of books on Islam. Among them eight monographs on Islamic creed, including 'in the Light of Quran and Sunnah' (Silsilat al-'aqida fi daw' al-kitab wa-l-sunna). In 1998, the Saudi publisher al-Dar 'Alamiyya li-l kitab wa-l-sunna' agreed to translate eight volumes of the series into twenty-five languages, including 'Endtime', a work about Islamic Eschatology, first published in English in 1999.

=== Eschatology ===
In his writings 'The Last Day' (al-Yawm al-akhir), he outlines the doctrines of Islamic Eschatology as it has become mostly accepted in Salafi circles. Diverging from previous authors, al-Ashqar does not apply hadith-criticism and does not considered different degrees of soundness of narrations.

In contrast to some proto-Salafis, such as Ibn Qayyim, who served as an inspiration for his methodology, he rejects the doctrine of "annihilation of hell" (fanāʾ al-nār). In his interpretation of related hadiths, he asserts that only those who stick close to the Quran and the Sunnah go to paradise, while those considered deviant, such as Mu'tazilites and Kharijites go to hell temporarily, while groups he considered wholly outside the fold of Islam such as Isma'ilis, Alevites, and Druze, go to hell forever.

In regard to a famous hadith stating that the "majority of inhabitants of hell are women", he defends the piety of women. Rather than blaming women's piety, he states that women are subject to uncontrollable passions and suffer from intellectual deficiencies.

=== On angels, jinn, and devils ===
Al-Ashqar's 'Alam al-jinn wa'l-shayatin became a major source for many Salafi authorities, on matters of jinn and devils, including many scholars of the Egyptian authorities of the Ansar al-Sunnah. Here, al-Ashqar disagrees with the majority of Classical Sunni authorities in that the devils were originally angels, and sides with an originally minority view held by Hasan al-Basri i.e. that the jinn are of the genus of Iblis.

Similarly, al-Ashqar disregards many other hadiths around angels traditionally accepted. He furthermore neglects past scholars who held such views.

For al-Ashqar, humans, angels, and jinn belong to the three beings designated as mukallaf, i.e. beings holding legal responsibilities.
