= Fatir =

35th chapter of the Qur'an

Surah 35 of the Quran
فاطر Fāṭir The Originator
- Qira'ah; English text
- Classification: Meccan
- Position: Juzʼ 22
- No. of verses: 45
- No. of Rukus: 5
- No. of words: 871
- No. of letters: 3191

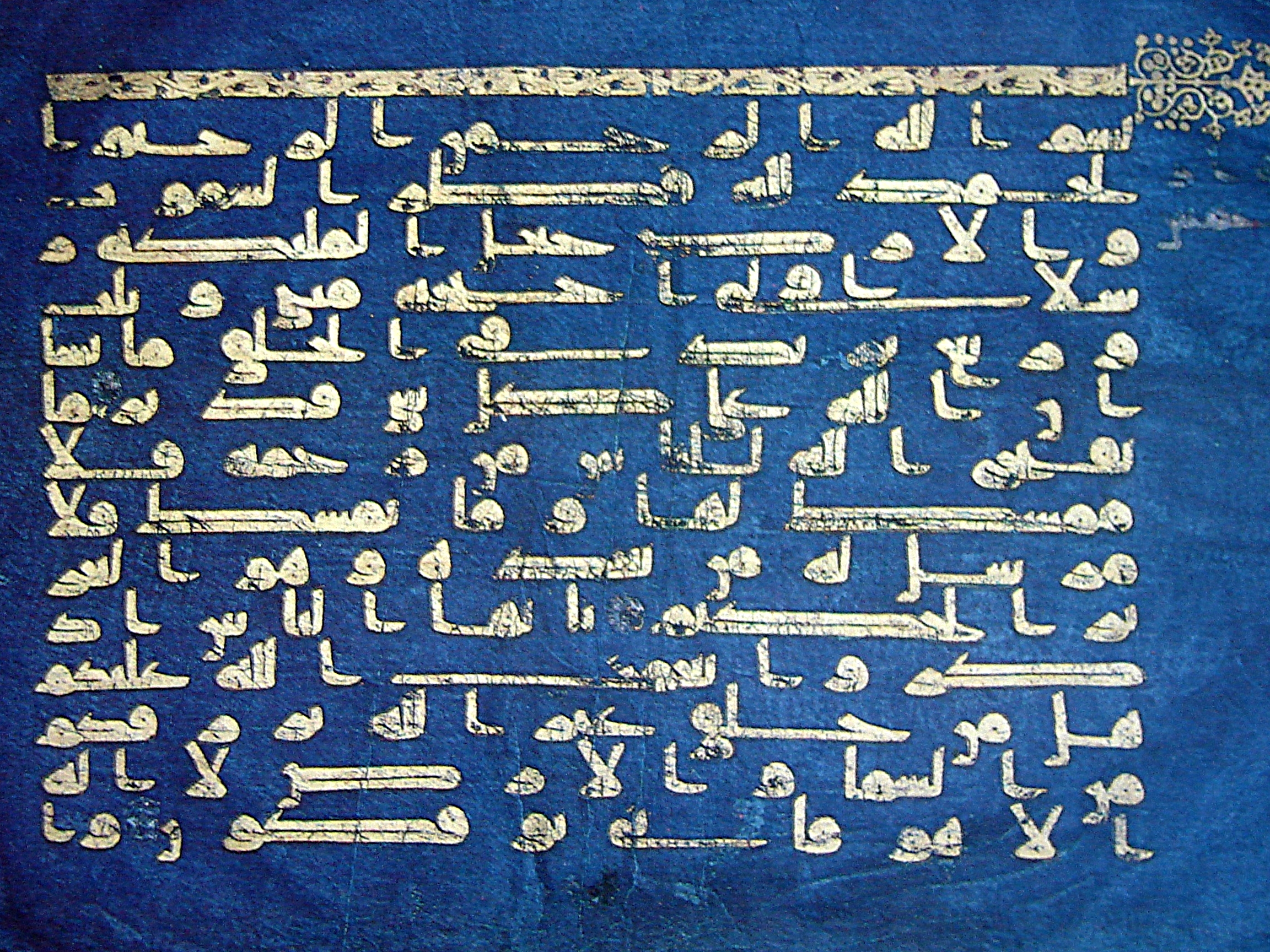
Folio from the Blue Quran with the first three verses of the chapter Fatir. Raqqada National Museum of Islamic Art, Tunisia

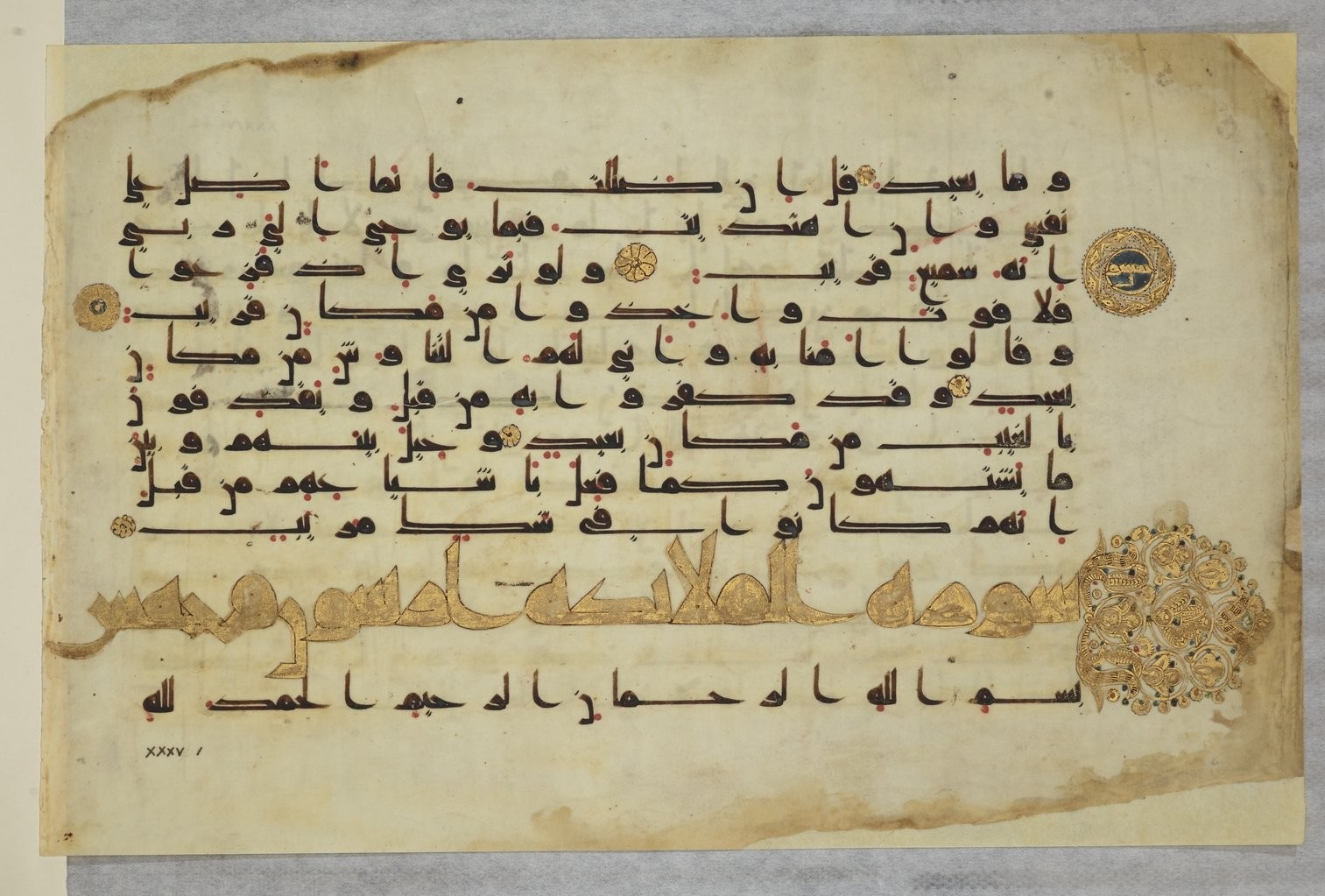
Qur'an folio in kufic script with heading for the chapter Fatir. 9th or 10th century. Bibliothèque nationale de France

Fatir (Arabic: فاطر, fāṭir; meaning: Originator), also known as Al-Mala’ikah (ﺍﻟملائكة, ’al-malā’ikah; meaning: "The Angels"), is the 35th chapter (sūrah) of the Qur'an with 45 verses (āyāt). Parts of the verses 39-45 are preserved in the Ṣan‘ā’1 lower text.

Regarding the timing and contextual background of the believed revelation (asbāb al-nuzūl), it is an earlier "Meccan surah", which means it is believed to have been revealed in Mecca, rather than later in Medina.

== References to Surah Fatir ==
This surah also refers to God's abundant forgiveness. For example, we see in Surah Fatir verse 30:

لِيُوَفِّيَهُمْ أُجُورَهُمْ وَيَزِيدَهُمْ مِنْ فَضْلِهِ ۚ إِنَّهُ غَفُورٌ شَكُورٌ

Translation: [They do all this] so that [God] will give them a full reward and increase their bounty; Indeed, He is Most Forgiving and Most Merciful to the little deed. (30)

And also in other verses:

وَقَالُوا الْحَمْدُ لِلَّهِ الَّذِي أَذْهَبَ عَنَّا الْحَزَنَ ۖ إِنَّ

رَبَّنَا لَغَفُورٌ شَكُورٌ

Translation: And they say: All praises belong to God, who took away our sorrow; Undoubtedly, our Lord is very forgiving and bestowing against a small deed. (34)

== Summary ==
- 1–2 God praised as the Sovereign Creator
- 3 The Quraish exhorted to worship the true God
- 4 Muhammad told that it is no strange thing for a prophet to be called an impostor
- 5–6 God's promises true, but Satan is a deceiver
- 7 Reward for believers and punishment for infidels sure
- 8–9 Reprobate sinners shall not be as the righteous before God
- 10 God exalteth the righteous but bringeth to nought the devices of sinners
- 11 The desert made green by rainfall a type of the resurrection
- 12 God, who is man's Creator, knoweth all things
- 13 God's mercy to man seen in the waters
- 14 Day, night, the sun, and moon glorify God
- 14–15 The vanity of idol-worship
- 16–18 Man is dependent on God, but God is self-sufficient
- 19 Every one shall bear his own burden in the judgment-day
- 19 Muhammad commanded to admonish secret believers
- 20–22 God will not regard the righteous and the unrighteous alike
- 22 Buried person can't be made listen anything
- 23 Every nation has its own prophet
- 24–25 Those who accused the former prophets of imposture were punished
- 26–28 God's mercy seen in nature
- 29–30 God rewards the prayerful and the charitable
- 31 The Qurán a confirmation of former Scriptures
- 32 The varied conduct of those who receive the Qurán
- 33–35 The rewards of the faithful in Paradise
- 36–37 The just punishment of disbelievers in hell
- 38 God knoweth the secrets of the heart
- 39 Disbelievers shall reap the fruit of their infidelity
- 40 God gave the idolaters no authority for their idolatry
- 41 God alone sustains the heavens
- 42 The Quraish impiously reject their Prophet
- 43 They shall receive the punishment bestowed upon those who rejected the former prophets
- 44 Arab polytheists were admonished to see the fate of previous nations before them.
- 45 Were God punish sinners, the world would be bereft of its human population but also God postpone their punishment until fixed time and when it's fixed time comes, God will regard his servants

== Exegesis ==
Abu Hamza al-Thumal recorded from a parchment containing a speech on asceticism given by Imam Ali ibn Husayn Zayn al-Abidin in which the following verse from Surah Fatir was referenced:

۝ 35:28: "Those truly fear Allah, among His Servants who have knowledge: for Allah is Exalted in Might, Oft-Forgiving."

Concerning this verse, Zayn al-Abidin comments that the knowledge, by Allah, and the deeds are nothing but two harmonious matters. The one who recognizes Allah fears him, and the fear urges him to the deeds in obedience to Allah; the heads of knowledge follow him, recognize Allah, and strive to do good deeds.
