= Kiraman Katibin =

Angels recording the actions of people in Islam

In Islamic tradition the kiraman katibin (Arabic: كراماً كاتبين, ‘noble writers’) are believed to be angels tasked with recording a person's actions. They are mentioned in the Quran and their function is expanded upon by hadith. One angel is said to be tasked with writing down good deeds and the second to write down evil deeds.

== Description ==
A pair of angels are tasked to record the deeds of a person. The work of the noble writers is to write down and record every action of a person each day. One angel figuratively seated on the right side and records all good deeds, while the other seated on the left side and records all bad deeds.

In the Quran, the angels are mentioned in Surah 6:61; 13:11; 50:17-18 and 82:10-12. Details about them are mostly found in the commentary on 13:11. Tafsir and hadith agree that these angels record the actions of humans. A hadith transmitted from Ibn Abbas recorded by al-Tabari was quoted by Al-Suyuti, that the kiraman katibin are never absent accompanying a person except on 3 occasions: when the person take a defecation, Najis state, and during bath.

Hadiths about these angels often emphasize God's mercy. According to one hadith mentioned by al-Suyuti, a good action is written down ten times. A hadith from Al-Tabarani, also recorded by al-Albani in his book Sahih al-Jami, states that the Kiraman Katibin are tasked to suspend their recording a sin for the span of 6 hours. If the person repented from his sin, then the angels will abort the record of the deed. However, if that person did not repent in the given time, the angels will record the deed.

The angels are tasked only to write down the actual actions of a person, but not actions they only thought about. A hadith qudsi states: "When My servant wants to do an evil deed, do not record it against him until he does it...."

== See also ==
- List of angels in theology
- List of characters and names mentioned in the Quran
