= An-Naba =

78th chapter of the Qur'an

Surah 78 of the Quran
النبأ An-Nabaʾ The News / The Tidings
- Qira'ah; English text
- Classification: Meccan
- Position: Juzʼ 30
- No. of verses: 40
- No. of Rukus: 2
- No. of words: 174
- No. of letters: 796

An-Naba
Recitation of An-Naba in mujawwad.

An-Naba or The News (Arabic: النبأ, an-nabaʼ, also known as "The Tidings", "The Announcement") is the seventy-eighth chapter (surah) of the Quran, with forty ayat or verses.

== Summary ==
The first twenty verses discuss the wonders of the worldly creation (the earth, plants, the peace of night, the mountains and rain); the final twenty verses are about the eternal wonders and horrors of the next world, with the raging sinner (the Arabic triliteral root TGY "taagheena" is used) being punished starkly opposed with the rewarding of dutiful believers in paradise. The Arabic triliteral root WQY "muttaqeena" is employed as a poetic parataxis to TGY).

== Ayat (Verses) ==
1-5 Unbelievers shall yet learn the truth of the resurrection
6-16 God the Creator and Preserver of all things
17-20 Judgment-day scenes described
21-30 The recompense of unbelievers in hell described
31-37 The joys of believers in Paradise described
37-38 No intercessor except by God’s permission
39-40 Sinners exhorted to flee from the day of wrath

== Hadith ==
- Abu Ishaq narrated from Ikrima ibn Abi Jahl, from Ibn Abbas who said: "Abu Bakr [may Allah be pleased with him] said: 'O Messenger of Allah! You have become gray.' He said: 'I have gone gray from Hud (surah), Al-Waqi'a, Al-Mursalat and `Amma Yatasa'alun (An-Naba) and Idhash-Shamsu Kuwwirat (At-Takwir).'"
- Imam Ja'far al-Sadiq said: Whoever recites Amma Yatasa'alun (An-Naba) every day, a year will not pass for him unless he visit the House of God, if God wills.
