= Guardian angel =

Protective and tutelary angel

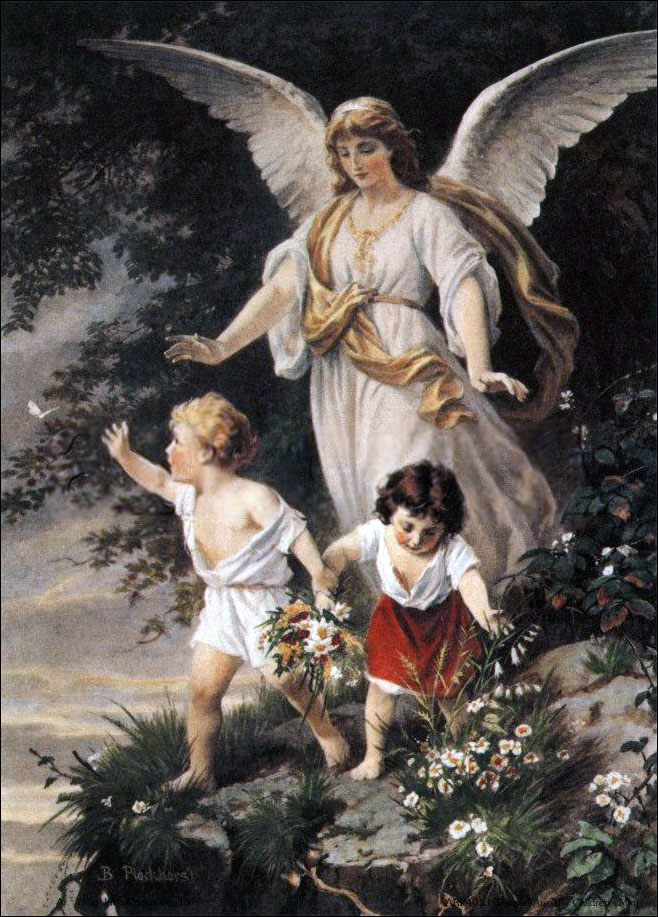
Schutzengel ("Guardian angel") by Bernhard Plockhorst depicts a guardian angel watching over two children.

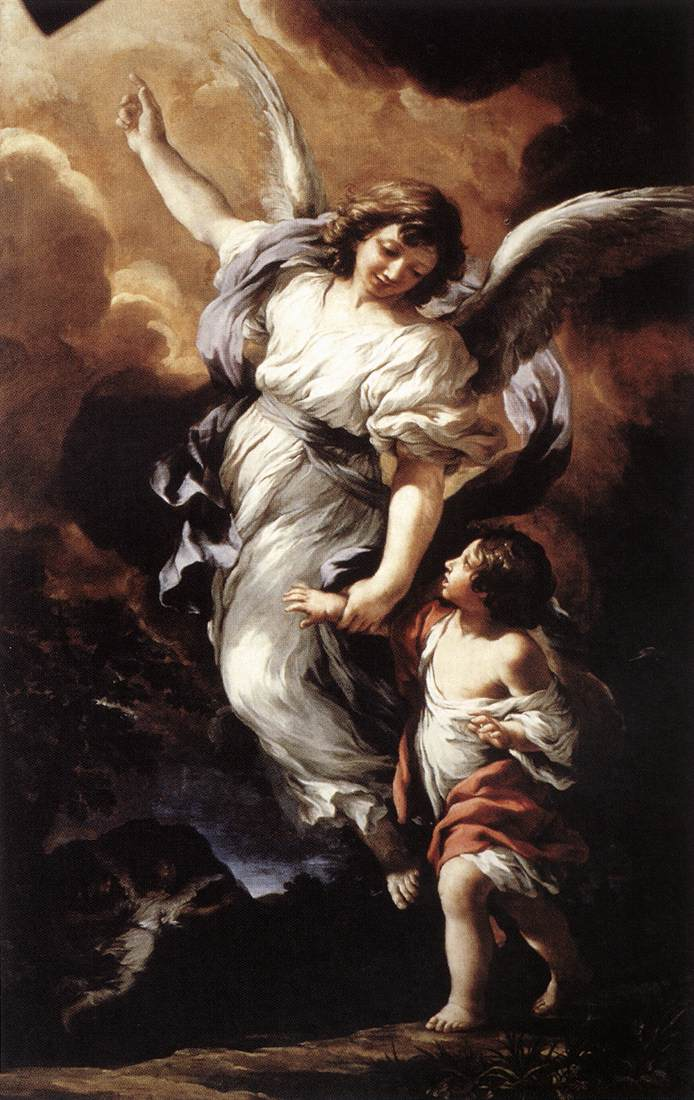
Guardian Angel by Pietro da Cortona, 1656

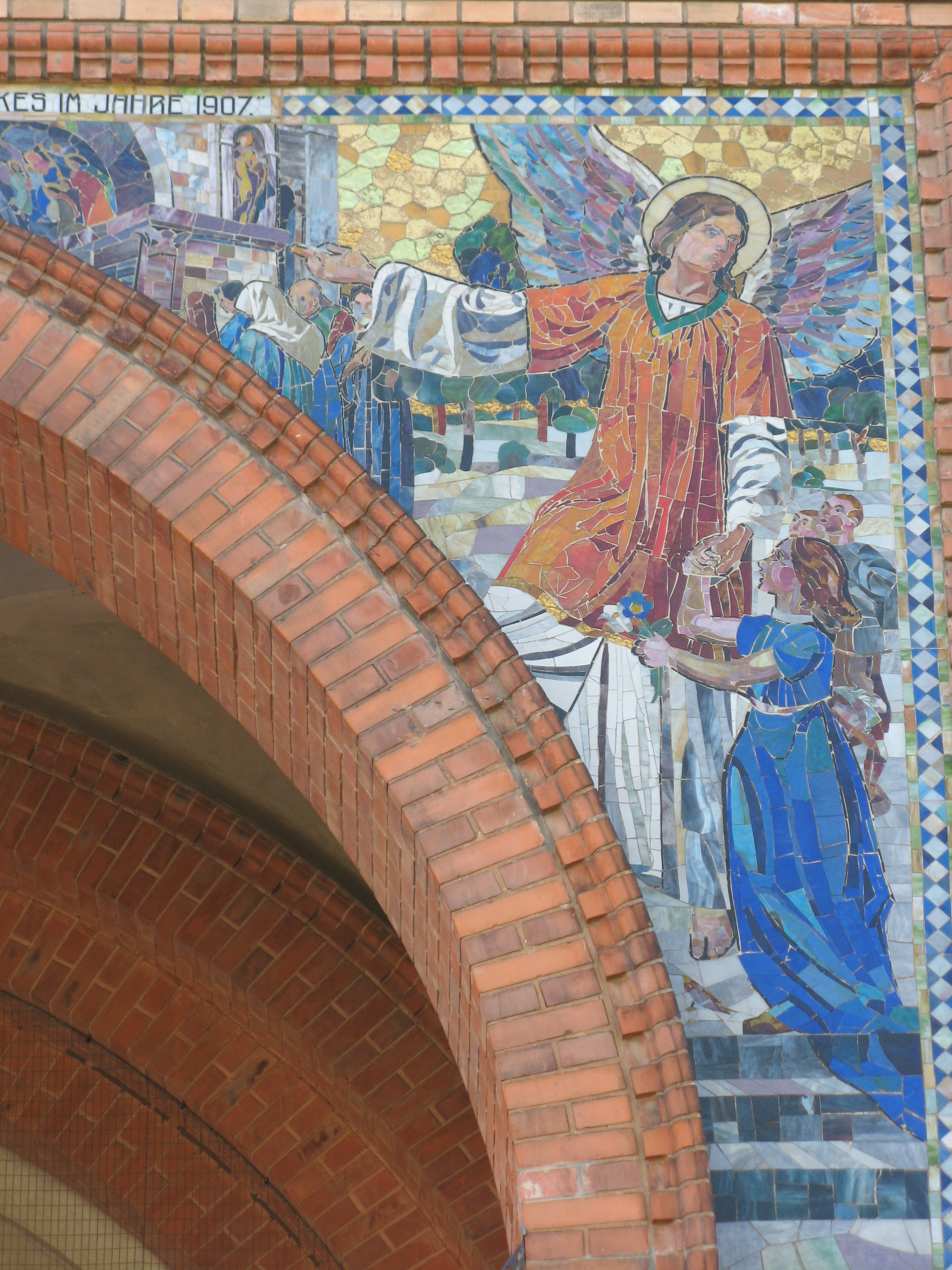
Schutzengel-Mosaik (1907) am Hauptportal der Antonskirche, Antonsplatz, Wien-Favoriten/guardian angel mosaic (1907) at the main portal of St. Anthony's Church, Antonsplatz, Vienna-Favoriten

A guardian angel is a type of angel that is assigned to protect and guide a particular person, group or nation. Belief in tutelary beings can be traced throughout all antiquity. The idea of angels that guard over people played a major role in Ancient Judaism. In Christianity, the hierarchy of angels was extensively developed in the 5th century by Pseudo-Dionysius the Areopagite. The theology of angels and tutelary spirits has undergone many changes since the 5th century. The belief is that guardian angels serve to protect whichever person God assigns them to. The Memorial of the Holy Guardian Angels is celebrated on 2 October.

The idea of a guardian angel is central to the 15th-century book The Book of the Sacred Magic of Abramelin the Mage by Abraham of Worms, a German Cabalist. In 1897, this book was translated into English by Samuel Liddell MacGregor Mathers (1854–1918), a co-founder of the Hermetic Order of the Golden Dawn, who styled the guardian angel as the Holy Guardian Angel.

Aleister Crowley (1875–1947), the founder of the esoteric religion Thelema, considered the Holy Guardian Angel to be representative of one's truest divine nature and the equivalent of the Genius of the Hermetic Order of the Golden Dawn, the Augoeides of Iamblichus, the Atman of Hinduism, and the Daimon of the ancient Greeks. Following the teachings of the Golden Dawn, Crowley refined their rituals which were intended to facilitate the ability to establish contact with one's guardian angel.

== Zoroastrianism ==
In Zoroastrianism they are also known as Arda Fravaš - Holy Guardian Angels. Each person is accompanied by a guardian angel, which acts as a guide throughout life. They originally patrolled the boundaries of the ramparts of heaven, but volunteer to descend to earth to stand by individuals to the end of their days.

== Judaism ==
=== In the Hebrew Bible ===
The guardian angel concept is present in the books of the Hebrew Bible, and its development is well marked. These books described God's angels as his ministers who carried out his behests, and who were at times given special commissions, regarding men and mundane affairs.

In Genesis 18–19, angels not only acted as the executors of God's wrath against the cities of the plain, but they delivered Lot from danger; in Exodus 32:34, God said to Moses: "my angel shall go before thee." The story of Tobias concerns the angel Archangel Raphael guiding and aiding its primary character. Psalm 91:11 reads: "For He will command His angels concerning you to guard you in all your ways" (Cf. Psalm 33:8 and 34:5 — 34:7 and 35:6 in Protestant Bibles).

The belief that angels can be guides and intercessors for men can be found in Job 33:23–26, and in Daniel 10:13 angels seem to be assigned to certain countries. In this latter case, the "prince of the kingdom of Persia" contends with Gabriel. The same verse mentions "Michael, one of the chief princes".

=== Rabbinic literature ===
In rabbinic literature, the rabbis expressed the notion that there are indeed guardian angels appointed by God to watch over people.

Rashi on Daniel 10:7 "Our Sages of blessed memory said that although a person does not see something of which he is terrified, his guardian angel, who is in heaven, does see it; therefore, he becomes terrified."

Lailah is an angel of the night in charge of conception and pregnancy. Lailah serves as a guardian angel throughout a person's life and at death, leads the soul into the afterlife.

=== Late and modern Judaism ===
According to Rabbi Leo Trepp, in late Judaism, the belief developed that, "the people have a heavenly representative, a guardian angel. Every human being has a guardian angel. Previously the term Malakh (angel) simply meant messenger of God."

Chabad believes that people might indeed have guardian angels. For Chabad, God watches over people and makes decisions directly with their prayers and it is in this context that the guardian angels are sent back and forth as emissaries to aid in this task. Thus, they are not prayed to directly, but the angels are part of the workings of how the prayer and response comes about.

In the view of Rabbi Adin Steinsaltz:

The nature of the angel is to be, to a degree, as its name in Hebrew signifies, a messenger, to constitute a permanent contact between our world of action and the higher worlds. An angel's missions go in two directions: it may serve as an emissary of God downward… and it may also serve as the one carries things upwards from below... The angel cannot reveal its true form to man, whose being, senses and instruments of perception belong only to the world of action — it continues to belong to a different dimension even when apprehended in one form or another... The angel who is sent to us from another world does not always have a significance or impact beyond the normal laws of physical nature. Indeed it often happens that the angel precisely reveals itself in nature, in the ordinary common-sense world of causality.

In Judaism, there are references to angels with specific protective functions. An example of this can be seen in the birth protection rituals practiced among others by Ashkenazi Jews in parts of Alsace, Switzerland and Southern Germany. Pregnant women and newborn children would be given text amulets bearing the names of the angels Senoi, Sansenoi and Semangelo. These angels were supposed to protect pregnant women and newborn children from Lilith. This can be traced back to the story of Lilith, in which God sends three angels to bring Lilith back to Adam. They are unsuccessful in this task, but Lilith admits to having been created to harm children. She promises to spare children who carry the name or likeness of the three angels with them.

Samael was identified as the guardian angel and prince of Rome and the archenemy of Israel. By the beginning of Jewish culture in Europe, Samael had been established as a representative of Christianity, due to his identification with Rome.

== Christianity ==
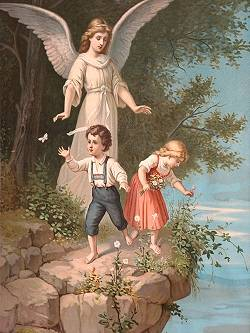
A guardian angel in a 19th-century print by Fridolin Leiber

=== New Testament ===
In the New Testament the concept of guardian angel may be noted. Angels are everywhere the intermediaries between God and man; and Christ set a seal upon the Old Testament teaching: "See that you despise not one of these little ones: for I say to you, that their angels in heaven always see the face of my Father who is in heaven." (Matthew 18:10). Guardian angels work both for single persons and for communities of people. Revelation 2:1–29 and Revelation 3:1–22 refers of the angels of the seven churches of Asia who work in the role of their guardians.

=== Catholic Church ===
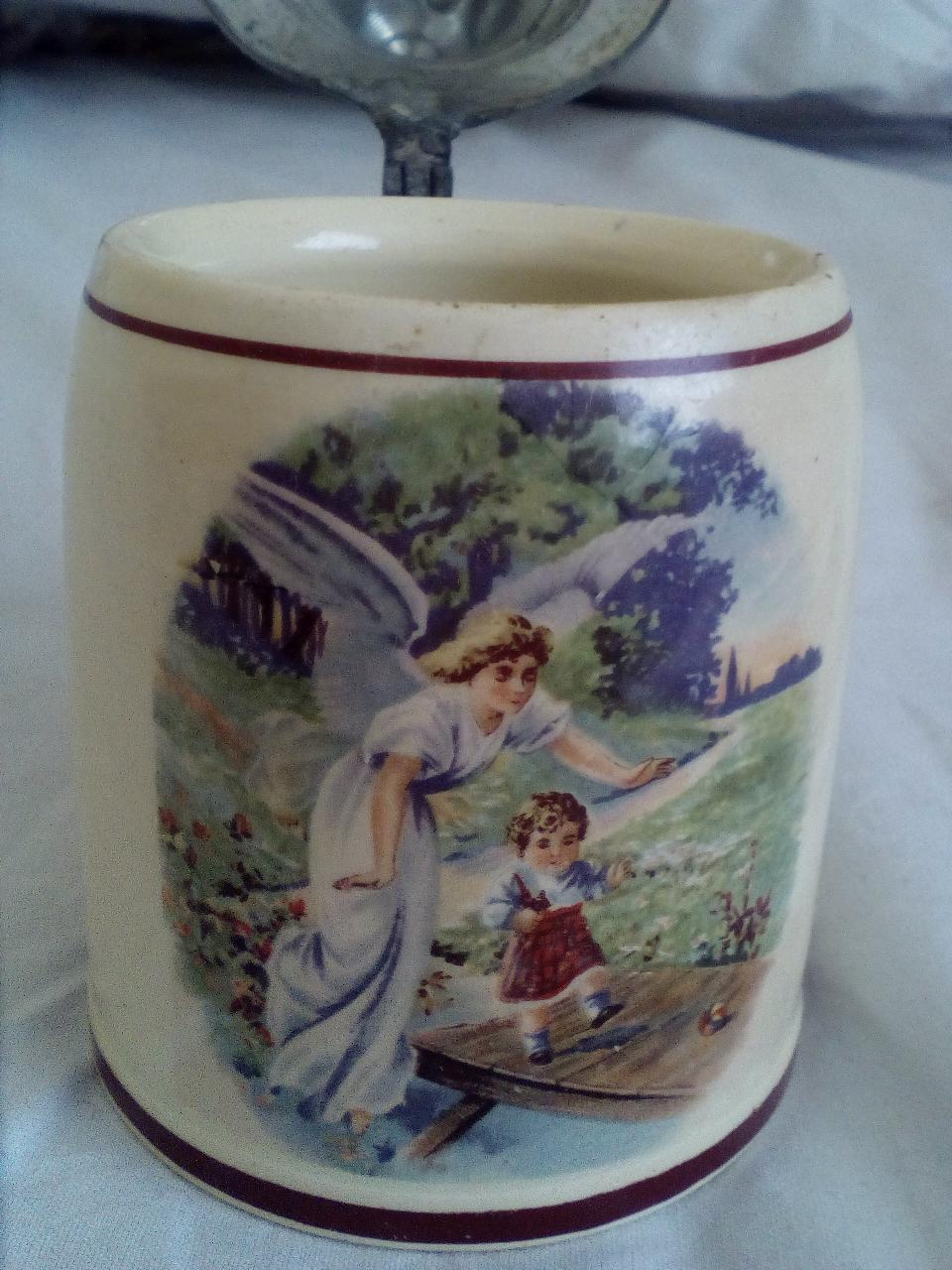
Guarding angel on a vintage tankard

According to Saint Jerome, the concept of guardian angels is in the "mind of the Church". He stated: "how great the dignity of the soul, since each one has from his birth an angel commissioned to guard it".

The first Christian theologian to outline a specific scheme for guardian angels was Honorius of Autun in the 12th century. He said that every soul was assigned a guardian angel the moment it was put into a body. Scholastic theologians augmented and ordered the taxonomy of angelic guardians. Thomas Aquinas agreed with Honorius and believed that it was the lowest order of angels who served as guardians, and his view was most successful in popular thought, but Duns Scotus said that any angel is bound by duty and obedience to the Divine Authority to accept the mission to which that angel is assigned. In the 15th century, the Feast of the Guardian Angels was added to the official calendar of Catholic holidays.

In his 31 March 1997 Regina Caeli address, Pope John Paul II referred to the concept of guardian angels and concluded the address with the statement: "Let us invoke the Queen of angels and saints, that she may grant us, supported by our guardian angels, to be authentic witnesses to the Lord's paschal mystery".

In his 2014 homily for the Feast of Holy Guardian Angels, 2 October, Pope Francis told those gathered for daily Mass to be like children who pay attention to their "traveling companion". "No one journeys alone and no one should think that they are alone", the Pope said. During the Morning Meditation in the chapel of Santa Marta, the Pope noted that oftentimes, we have the feeling that "I should do this, this is not right, be careful." This, he said, "is the voice of" our guardian angel. "According to Church tradition we all have an angel with us, who guards us..." The Pope instructed each, "Do not rebel, follow his advice!" The Pope urged that this "doctrine on the angels" not be considered "a little imaginative", as it is rather one of "truth": it is "what Jesus, what God said: 'I send an angel before you, to guard you, to accompany you on the way, so you will not make a mistake'".

Pope Francis concluded with a series of questions so that each one can examine their own conscience: "How is my relationship with my guardian angel? Do I listen to him? Do I bid him good day in the morning? Do I tell him: 'guard me while I sleep'? Do I speak with him? Do I ask his advice?" Each one of us can do so in order to evaluate "the relationship with this angel that the Lord has sent to guard me and to accompany me on the path, and who always beholds the face of the Father who is in heaven." He reiterated this in a homily on 2 October 2018: "Listen to the inspirations, which are always from the Holy Spirit – but the angel inspires them. But I want to ask you a question: Do you speak with your angel? Do you know the name of your angel? Do you listen to your angel?" The Congregation for Divine Worship and Discipline of the Sacraments discourages assigning names to angels beyond those revealed in scripture: Michael, Gabriel, and Raphael.

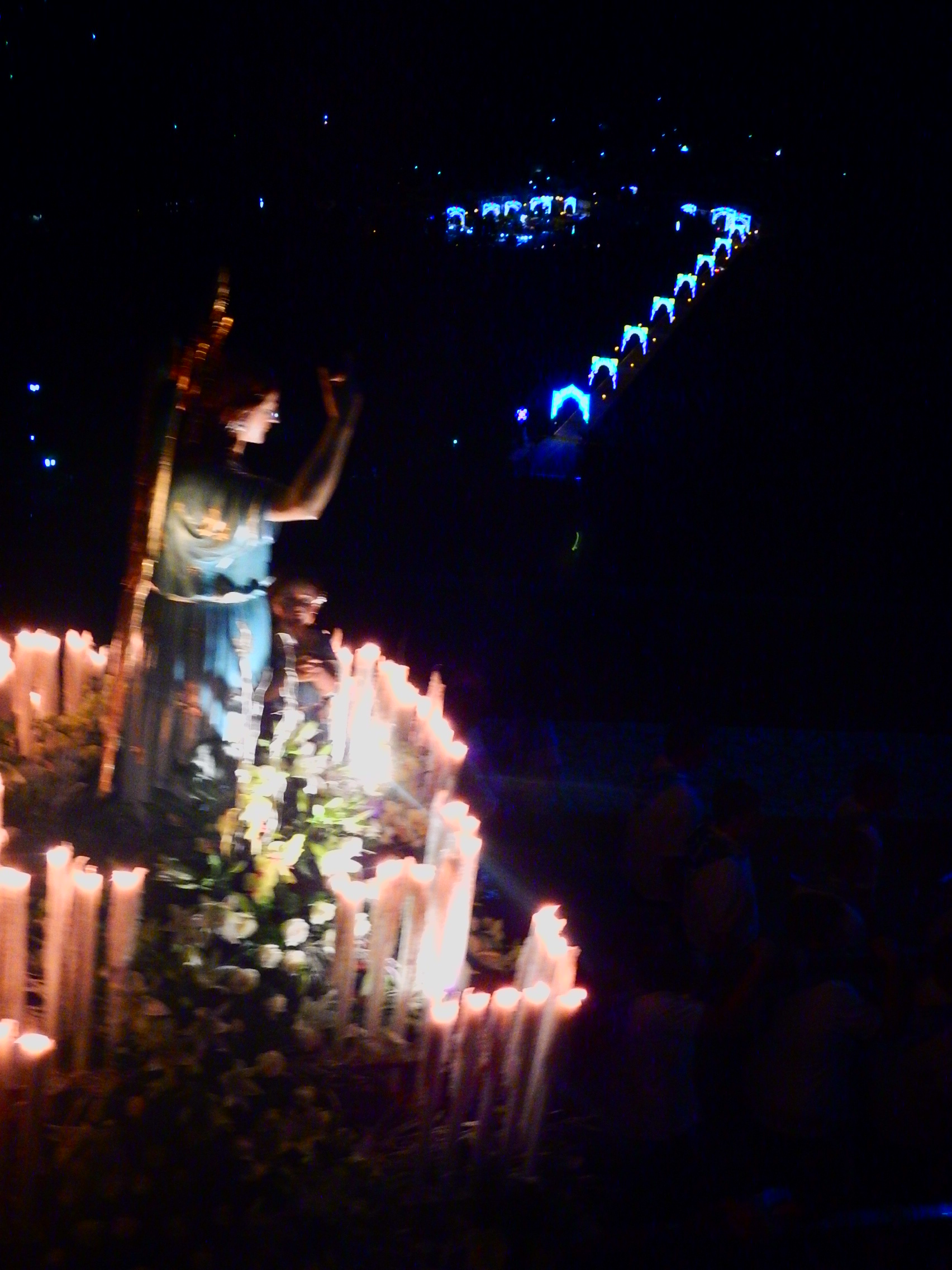
The celebration of the Guardian Angel at Fondachelli-Fantina on second Sunday of July, Sicily

The Opus Sanctorum Angelorum is a public association of the Catholic Church that Christians can join as members in order to promote "devotion to the holy angels and a covenant bond with them through a consecration approved by the Church, so that the holy angels may lead us more effectively to God." Within the Opus Sanctorum Angelorum is the Confraternity of the Holy Guardian Angels that one becomes eligible for after entering a two year formation period.

==== Angels as guardians ====
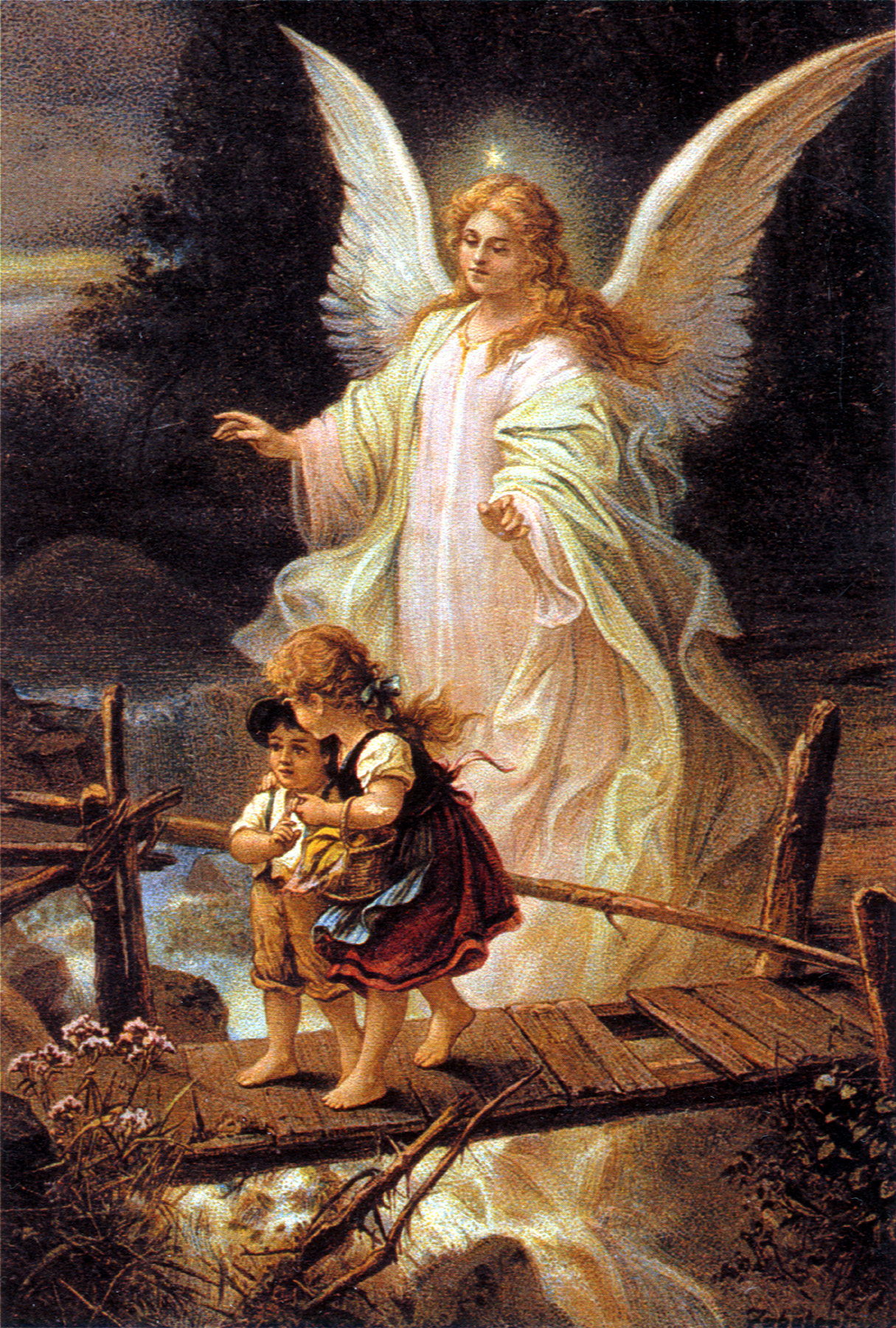
Guardian angel, German postcard, 1900

According to Aquinas, "On this road man is threatened by many dangers both from within and without, and therefore as guardians are appointed for men who have to pass by an unsafe road, so an angel is assigned to each man as long as he is a wayfarer." By means of an angel, God is said to introduce images and suggestions leading a person to do what is right.

==== Saints and their angels ====
Father Giovangiuseppe Califano recounted how, one day, a newly appointed bishop confessed to Pope John XXIII "that he could not sleep at night due to an anxiety which was caused by the responsibility of his office". "The pope told him, 'You know, I also thought the same when I was elected pope. But one day, I dreamed about my guardian angel, and it told me not to take everything so seriously.'" Pope John attributed the idea of calling Second Vatican Council to an inspiration from his guardian angel.

Saint Gemma Galgani, a Catholic mystic, stated that she had interacted with and spoken with her guardian angel. Saint Pio of Pietrelcina was known to instruct his parishioners to send him their guardian angel to communicate a trouble or issue to him when they could not travel to get to him or another urgency existed.

=== Anglican Communion ===
Of the Intercession and Invocation of Angels and Saints, printed in the Library of Anglo-Catholic Theology, held that "many learned Protestants think it probable that each of the faithful, at least, has a guardian angel. It seems certainly proved by Scripture. Zanchius says that all the Fathers held this opinion". Building upon sacred scripture and the teachings of the Church Fathers, Richard Montagu, the Anglican Bishop of Norwich in the 17th century, stated that

It is an opinion received, and hath been long, that if not every man, each son of Adam, yet sure each Christian man regenerate by water and the Holy Ghost, at least from the day of his regeneration and new birth unto God, if not from the time of his coming into the world, hath by God's appointment and assignation an Angel Guardian to attend upon him at all assayes, in all his ways, at his going forth, at his coming home.

=== Eastern Orthodox Church ===
Sergei Bulgakov writes that the Eastern Orthodox Church teaches that:

each man has a guardian angel who stands before the face of the Lord. This guardian angel is not only a friend and a protector, who preserves from evil and who sends good thought; the image of God is reflected in the creature—angels and men—in such a way that angels are celestial prototypes of men. Guardian angels are especially our spiritual kin. Scripture testified that the guardianship and direction of the elements, of places, of peoples, of societies, are confided to the guardian angels of the cosmos, whose very substance adds something of harmony to the elements they watch over.

As such, before the Eastern Orthodox liturgy of the Communion of the Faithful, a prayer asks "For an angel of peace, a faithful guide, a guardian of our souls and bodies, let us entreat the Lord. Amen."

=== Lutheran Church ===
The Morning Prayer and Evening Prayer found in Martin Luther's Small Catechism include the supplication "Let your holy angel be with me, that the evil foe may have no power over me". Donald Schneider, a Lutheran priest, states that Martin Luther may have based these prayers on Psalm 91, which includes a verse stating "For [God] will command his angels concerning you to guard you in all your ways. On their hands they will bear you up, lest you strike your foot against a stone".

=== Methodist Church ===
John W. Hanner, a Methodist minister and theologian, wrote on the topic of guardian angels in his Angelic Study, stating that:

Perhaps every Christian has a guardian angel. It may be that there is one angel to every Christian, or a score of them; or one may have charge of a score of Christians. Some of the ancient fathers believed that every city had a guardian angel, while others assigned one to every house and every man. None of us know how much we are indebted to angels for our deliverance from imminent peril, disease, and malicious plots of men and devils. Where the pious die, angels are to carry the soul to heaven, though it be a soul of a Lazarus.

In May and June 1743, Methodists experienced persecution in Wednesbury and Walsall and the founder of the Methodist Church, John Wesley, was threatened with death by a mob who dragged him in the rain; however, "Wesley escaped unharmed" and he "believed that he had been protected by his guardian angel".

=== Reformed and Presbyterian churches ===
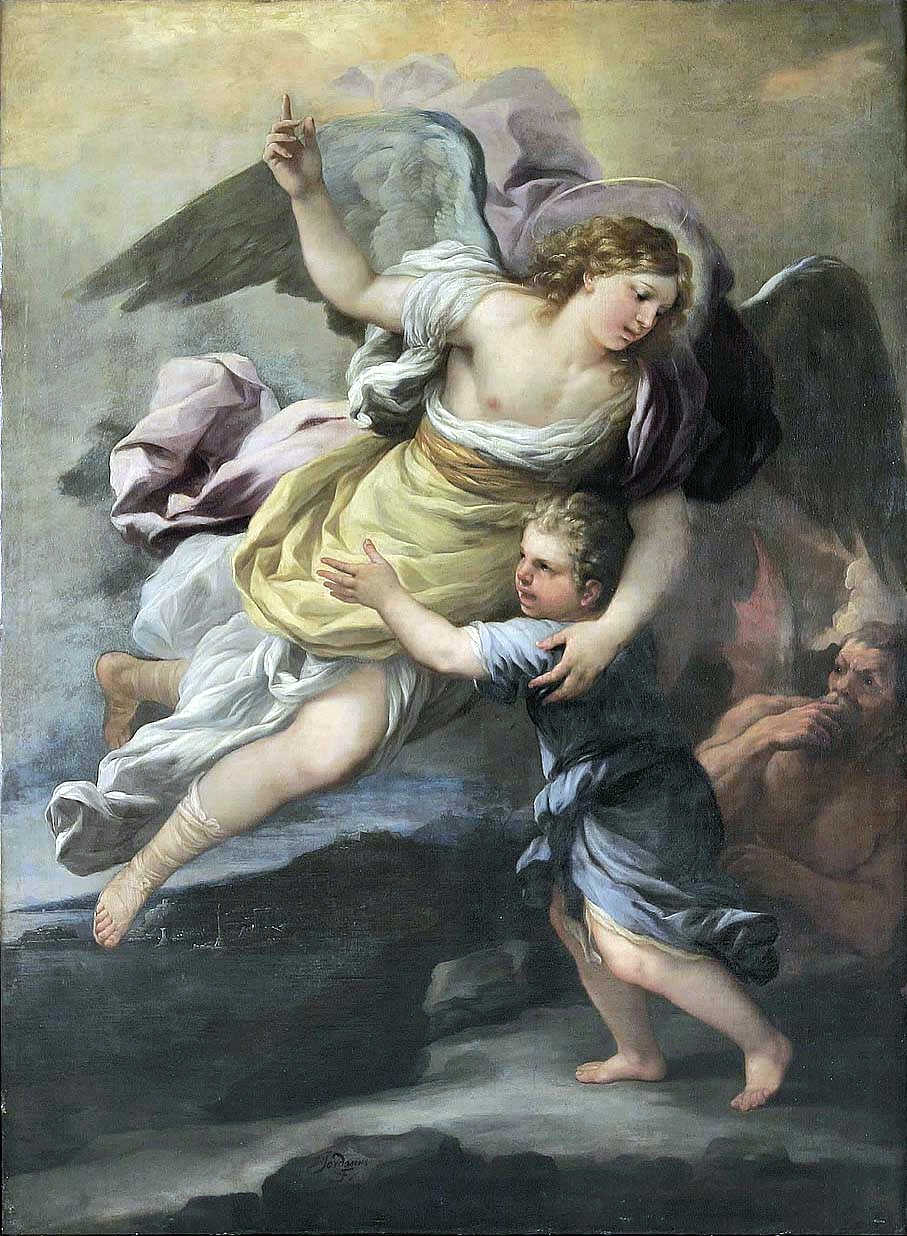
18th-century rendition of a guardian angel

In Reformed Dogmatics, Heinrich Heppe states that some Reformed theologians espoused the view of guardian angels, including Bucan, who taught:

That as a rule to each elect person a certain particular good angel is appointed by God to guard him, may be gathered from Christ's words, Mt. 18. 10, where it is said 'Their angels do continually behold the face of my Father.' Also from Ac. 12.15 where the believers who had assembled in Mark's house said of Peter knocking at the door, 'It is his angel'. These believers were speaking according to the opinion received among the people of God.

== Islam ==
There is a similar Islamic belief in the Mu'aqqibat. According to many Muslims, each person has two guardian angels, in front of and behind him, while the two recorders are located to the right and left.

== Renaissance magic ==
=== Jewish Thought ===
The idea of a Holy Guardian Angel is central to the book The Book of the Sacred Magic of Abramelin the Mage by Abraham of Worms, a German Jew, who wrote the book on ceremonial magic during the 15th century and which was later translated by Samuel Liddell MacGregor Mathers, a co-founder of the Hermetic Order of the Golden Dawn. He elaborated on this earlier work, giving it extensive magical notes. In Mathers' publication of The Book of the Sacred Magic of Abramelin the Mage, he writes:

If thou shalt perfectly observe these rules, all the following Symbols and an infinitude of others will be granted unto thee by thy Holy Guardian Angel; thou thus living for the Honour and Glory of the True and only God, for thine own good, and that of thy neighbour. Let the Fear of God be ever before the eyes and the heart of him who shall possess this Divine Wisdom and Sacred Magic.

=== Enochian magic ===
The Enochian system of 16th-century occultist John Dee discusses the guardian angel. In this dialog between Dee and the angel Jubanladace on p. 18, Cotton Appendix XLVI 1, the angel says the following:

Dee: If I should not offend you, I would gladly know of what order you are or how your state is in respect of Michael, Gabriel, Raphael or Uriel.

Jubanladace: Unto men, according unto their deserts, and the first excellency of their soul, God hath appointed a good Governor or Angel, from among the orders of those that are blessed. For every soul that is good, is not of one and the self same dignification. Therefore according to his excellency we are appointed as Ministers from that order, whereunto his excellency accordeth: to the intent that he may be brought, at last, to supply those places which were glorified by a former: and also to the intent, that the Prince of darkness might be counterposed in God's justice. (Note: Now in various collections of the British Library. See especially Sloane MSS 3188, 3189 and 3191, and Cotton Appendix XLVI. All the above are available in digital scans at: "Enochian Manuscripts Online". Archived from the original on 30 December 2011.)

== Thelema ==
Having studied The Book of Abramelin during his time with the Hermetic Order of the Golden Dawn, occult writer Aleister Crowley adapted the concept of the Holy Guardian Angel from Renaissance magic (see above) and made it central to the philosophy and practices of Thelema, popularizing it in the process.

In his earlier writings, Crowley states that the Holy Guardian Angel is the "silent self", the equivalent of the Genius of the Hermetic Order of the Golden Dawn, the Augoeides of Iamblichus, the Ātman of Hinduism, and the Daimon of the ancient Greeks. In his late sixties, when composing Magick Without Tears, he states that the Holy Guardian Angel is not one's self, but rather a discrete and independent being, who may have been previously human.

It should never be forgotten for a single moment that the central and essential work of the Magician is the attainment of the Knowledge and Conversation of the Holy Guardian Angel. Once he has achieved this he must of course be left entirely in the hands of that Angel, who can be invariably and inevitably relied upon to lead him to the further great step—crossing of the Abyss and the attainment of the grade of Master of the Temple.

== Literary usage ==
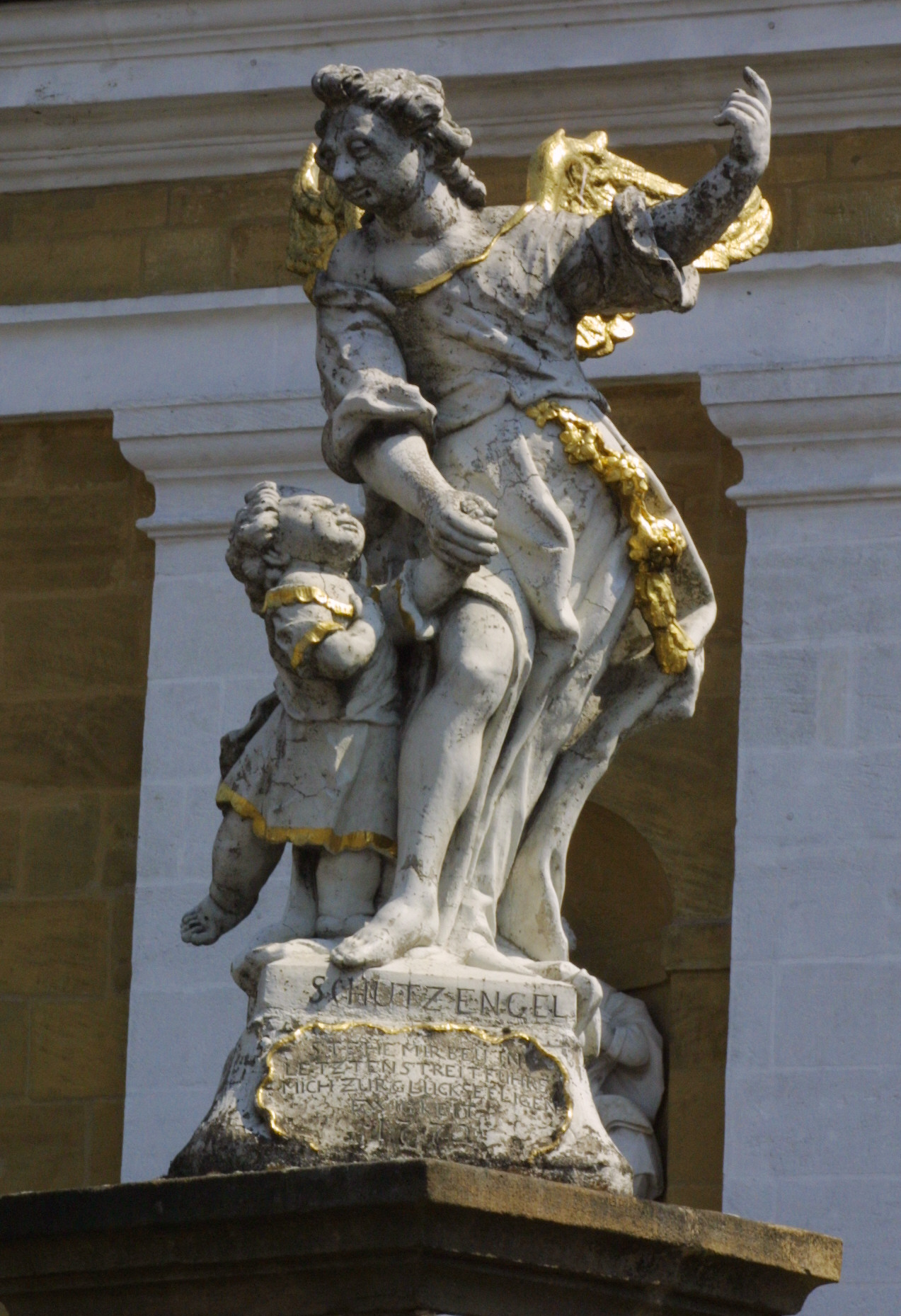
Statue of a guardian angel in Memmelsdorf, Germany

Guardian angels were often considered to be matched by a personal demon who countered the angel's efforts, especially in popular medieval drama such as morality plays like the 15th-century The Castle of Perseverance. In Christopher Marlowe's play The Tragical History of Doctor Faustus, c. 1592, Faustus has a "Good Angel" and "Bad Angel" who offer competing advice (Act 2, scene 1, etc.).

Guardian angels appear in literary works of the medieval and Renaissance periods. Later the Anglican English physician and philosopher Sir Thomas Browne (1605–1682), stated his belief in Religio Medici (part 1, paragraph 33):

Therefore for Spirits I am so farre from denying their existence, that I could easily beleeve, that not onely whole Countries, but particular persons have their Tutelary, and Guardian Angels: It is not a new opinion of the Church of Rome, but an old one of Pythagoras and Plato; there is no heresie in it, and if not manifestly defin'd in Scripture, yet is it an opinion of a good and wholesome use in the course and actions of a mans life, and would serve as an Hypothesis to salve many doubts, whereof common Philosophy affordeth no solution

By the 19th century, the guardian angel was no longer viewed in Anglophone lands as an intercessory figure, but rather as a force protecting the believer from performing sin. A parody appears in Lord Byron's 1819 poem Don Juan: "Her guardian angel had given up his garrison" (Canto I, xvii).

In Cardinal Newman's 1865 poem The Dream of Gerontius, the departed soul is met by his guardian angel. J. R. R. Tolkien talks of a Guardian Angel in several letters to his children. He described the Guardian Angel as "God's very attention itself, personalised".

== In popular culture ==
- Clarence Odbody, the guardian angel in the 1946 film It's a Wonderful Life and the 1990 film Clarence, "earned his wings" through bringing awareness that life was worth living to the 1946 film's protagonist, George Bailey.
- Teen Angel, Frenchy's guardian angel in the 1978 film Grease, who advises her to return to high school in the song "Beauty School Dropout".

== See also ==
- Angel of God – Roman Catholic traditional prayer
- Angel of Portugal – Guardian angel
- Recording angel – Angel who records a person's life and prayers
- Shoulder angel – Plot device used for an effect in fictional works
- Fravashi - Guardian ancestor-spirits in Zoroastrianism
