= Angel of God =

Roman Catholic traditional prayer

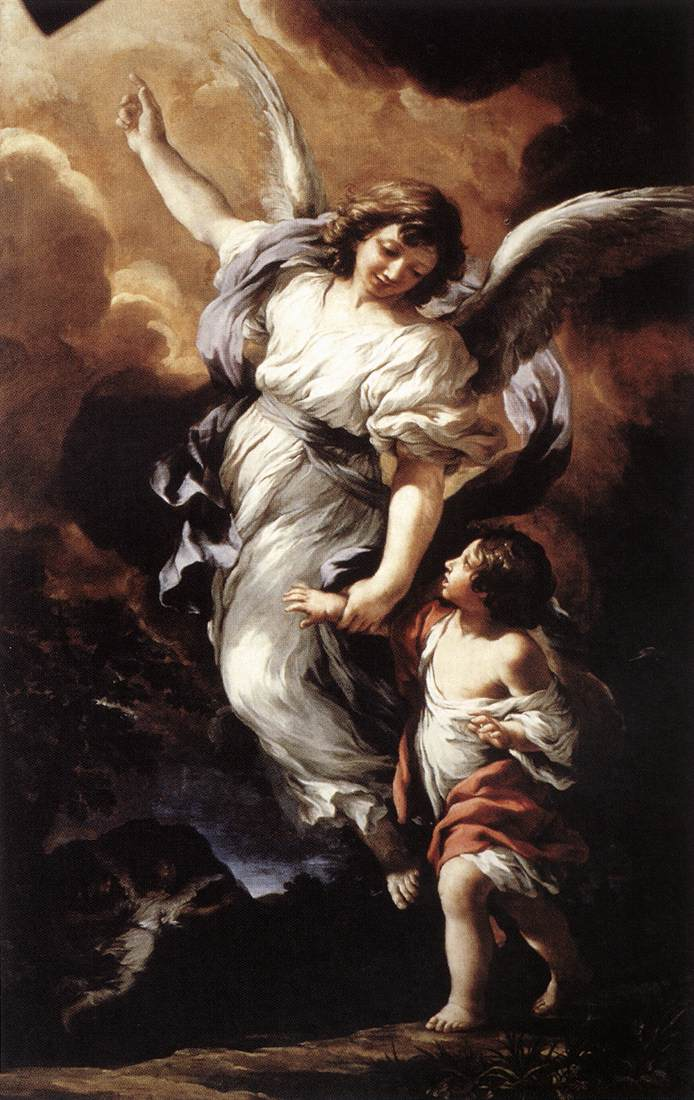
Guardian angel, by Pietro da Cortona, 1656

"Angel of God" (Latin: Ángele Dei) is a Roman Catholic traditional prayer for the intercession of the guardian angel, often taught to young children as the first prayer learned. It serves as a reminder of God's love, and by enjoining the guardian angel to support the child in a loving way, the prayer echoes God's abiding love.

The original Latin prayer consists of two rhyming couplets. The customary English form of the prayer is metrical as well as rhyming. In many languages the customary form of the prayer is a direct prose translation of the Latin, while in others (for instance Polish) a poetic translation predominates.

== Origins ==
The prayer was originally ascribed to St Anselm of Canterbury, although later scholarship now ascribes it to the inspiration of Reginald of Canterbury, who was a contemporary of Anselm. A prayer with numerous similarities to the Angel of God prayer is found in Reginald's Life of St Malchus, and it is thought the current prayer is derived from that written by Reginald.

The prayer invokes the protection of a guardian angel. In Catholic theology, angels act as messengers of God, and out of God's mercy a guardian angel is assigned to each soul to protect them through their life from spiritual dangers.

== Latin text ==
Ángele Dei,

qui custos es mei,
me tibi commissum pietáte supérna,
hodie (or hac nocte) illúmina, custódi, rege et gubérna.

Amen.

== English version ==
Angel of God,

my guardian dear,
to whom God's love commits me here,
ever this day (or ever this night), be at my side, to light and guard, to rule and guide.

Amen.

== Indulgence ==
By concession of Pius VI on October 2 1795, and by Pius VII on May 15 1821 one acquires 100 days of Indulgence each time it is recited, and the plenary once a month when the Angele Dei has been recited each day.

This type of indulgence was suppressed by the Indulgentiarum Doctrina of Pope Paul VI.

However, the Enchiridion Indulgentiarum of 2004 grants partial indulgence to the faithful who have piously recited one of the prayers approved by the Church for the guardian angel (e.g. the Angele Dei).
