= Al-Inshiqaq =

84th chapter of the Qur'an

Surah 84 of the Quran
الانشقاق Al-Inshiqāq The Sundering
- Qira'ah; English text
- Classification: Meccan
- Other names: Splitting Open, The Rupture The Rending
- Position: Juzʼ 30
- No. of verses: 25
- No. of Sajdahs: 1
- No. of words: 108
- No. of letters: 436

Al-Inshiqaq
Recitation of Al-Inshiqaq in mujawwad.

Al-Inshiqāq (Arabic: الانشقاق, "The Sundering", "Splitting Open") is the eighty-fourth chapter (surah) of the Qur'an, with 25 verses (āyāt). It mentions details of the Day of Judgment when, according to this chapter, everyone will receive reckoning over their deeds in this world.

== Summary ==
- 1-5 Signs of the Judgment Day
- 6-15 The books of the righteous and the wicked given into their hands, and the consequence thereof
- 16-20 Oaths attesting the doctrine of the resurrection
- 21 ۩ 25 The unbelievers denounced and threatened

The name of the chapter, Al-Inshiqaq, is a noun variously translated as "The Sundering", "The Bursting Asunder", "The Splitting Open", among others. This name comes from the first verse of the chapter which reads When the sky is rent asunder. The verse does not contain the word al-inshiqaq verbatim, but rather it contains a word of the same root. It is a reference to the destruction of the world at the end of days, which the chapter portend. Thematically, the chapter follows a day-of-judgement theme that is present in the preceding chapters, including Al-Infitar (the 82nd chapter) and Al-Mutaffifin (83rd).

The chapter begins (verses 1 to 5) by mentioning events that will happen on the Day of Judgment, including the sundering of the sky and the flattening of all that is on earth. Verses 6 to 15 talk about the disparity between those who in that day will be "given [their] book in [their] right hand" and have a joyful reckoning, and those who will not. A series of oaths (verses 16–18) follows, and then another contrast between the fate of the believers and the unbelievers in the day of judgment.

== Revelation ==
According to the Islamic tradition, Al-Inshiqaq was most likely revealed after the 82nd chapter Al-Infitar, and was chronologically one of the last of the Meccan surahs—chapters revealed before Muhammad's migration to Medina.

== Prostration ==
According to the hadith, Muhammed was prostrated when reciting this chapter, particularly after the verse 21 which reads ... and that when the Quran is recited unto them, they do not prostrate? Therefore, most Islamic scholars consider this verse one of the 15 verses in the Quran where one prostrates after reciting it. In most copies of the Qur'an these are indicated by the symbol ۩. Most Maliki jurists consider it obligatory to prostrate after reciting the verse; Malik ibn Anas, the founder of the Maliki school, was a notable exception.
