= Al-Mutaffifin =

83rd chapter of the Qur'an

Surah 83 of the Quran
المطففين Al-Muṭaffifīn Defrauding
- Qira'ah; English text
- Classification: Meccan
- Other names: The Cheats, The Cheaters, Those That Engage in Cheating, The Defrauders, The Stinters, The Unjust
- Position: Juzʼ 30
- No. of verses: 36
- No. of words: 169
- No. of letters: 750

Al-Muṭaffifīn (Arabic: المطففين, "The Defrauders") is the eighty-third surah of the Qur'an. It has 36 ayat or verses.

== Summary ==
The primary theme of this surah is Islamic eschatology or the hereafter, and the rhetoric addresses the following subjects is the discourse. The surah opens with a declaration of war and denunciation of those who use false weights and measures in the first six ayat. The surah warns the audience that the acts of the wicked are recorded in the book Sajjín in 7th to 9th ayaat. The surah makes explicit the relation between morality and the doctrine of the Hereafter effectively and impressively with woes to those who reject Muhammad and deny the judgment-day in ayaat up to 17th. Further up to 21st ayat, the surah describes that the acts of the righteous are registered in Illiyún. The rewards of the righteous in Paradise are explained in ayaat 22nd up to 28th. In conclusion, from 29th to the 36th ayat, the believers have been consoled, and the disbelievers warned as if to say: Unbelievers mock at Muslims now but shall be laughed at in turn on the Day of Resurrection.

== Ayat (verses) ==
- 1-6 Denunciation of those who use false weights and measures
- 7-9 The acts of the wicked are recorded in the book Sajjín
- 10-18 Woe to those who reject Muhammad and deny the judgment-day
- 18-21 The acts of the righteous are registered in Illiyún
- 22-28 The rewards of the righteous in Paradise
- 29-36 Unbelievers mock at The Believers now, but shall be laughed at in return

== Name of the surah ==
Jalaluddin Al-Suyuti co-author of the classical Sunni tafsīr known as Tafsir al-Jalalayn suggests that some of the sūrahs have been named using incipits (i.e. the first few words of the surah). Hamiduddin Farahi a celebrated Islamic scholar of Indian subcontinent is known for his groundbreaking work on the concept of Nazm, or Coherence, in the Quran. He writes that some sūrahs have been given names after some conspicuous words used in them. The Surah takes its name from its second word al-Mutaffifin -Abul A'la Maududi.

== Placement and coherence with other surahs ==
The idea of a textual relation between the verses of a chapter has been discussed under various titles such as nazm and munasabah in non-English literature and coherence, text relations, intertextuality, and unity in English literature. Hamiduddin Farahi, an Islamic scholar of the Indian subcontinent, is known for his work on the concept of nazm, or coherence, in the Quran. Fakhruddin al-Razi (died 1209 CE), Zarkashi (died 1392) and several other classical as well as contemporary Quranic scholars have contributed to the studies.

This surah belongs to the seventh and final group of surahs which starts from Surah Al-Mulk (67) and runs to the end of the Quran. This surah forms a pair with the next one (Al-Inshiqaq) about their subject-matter.

== Hadith ==
- "When the Prophet Muhammad came to Al-Madinah, they were the worst people in weights and measures. Then, Allah, Glorious is He revealed: "Woe to the Mutaffifun (those who give less in measure and weight)"(Al-Mutaffifin), and they were fair in weights and measures after that.
- According to Abdullah ibn Masud, Muhammad used to recite two equal surahs in one rak'ah; he would recite (for instance) An-Naziat (79) in one rak'ah, surahs (Al-Mutaffifin) (83) and Sūrat al-ʿAbasa (80) in one rak'ah.
