= Manzil =

Division of the Quran into seven sections for recitation in a week

For the convenience of those who read the Quran in a week the text may be divided into seven portions, each known as Manzil.

The following division to 7 equal portions is by Hamzah az-Zaiyyat (d.156/772):

1. Al-Fatiha (chapter 1) through an-Nisa (chapter 4) consisting of 4 chapters (Surah).
2. Al-Ma'idah (chapter 5) through at-Tawbah (chapter 9) consisting of 5 chapters.
3. Yunus (chapter 10) through an-Nahl (chapter 16) consisting of 7 chapters.
4. al-Isra'' (chapter 17) through al-Furqan (chapter 25) consisting of 9 chapters.
5. ash-Shu'ara' (chapter 26) through Ya-Sin (chapter 36) consisting of 11 chapters.
6. as-Saaffat (chapter 37) through al-Hujurat (chapter 49) consisting of 13 chapters.
7. Qaf (chapter 50) through al-Nas (chapter 114) consisting of 65 chapters.

== See also ==
- Juz'
- Rub el Hizb
