= Al-Ma'idah =

5th chapter of the Qur'an

Surah 5 of the Quran
اَلْمَائدَةْ Al-Ma'idah The Table [Spread with Food]
- Qira'ah; English text
- Classification: Medinan
- Other names: The Feast
- Position: Juzʼ 6 to 7
- Hizb no.: 11 to 13
- No. of verses: 120
- No. of Rukus: 16
- No. of words: 2837
- No. of letters: 12206

Al-Ma'idah (Arabic: ٱلْمَائدَة, romanized: al-Māʾidah; lit. 'The Table [Spread with Food]') is the fifth chapter of the Quran, containing 120 verses.

Al-Mā'idah means "Meal" or "Banquet" . This name is taken from verses 112 to 115, which tell of the meal sent down from the sky by Allah at the request of Prophet 'Isa (Jesus) and his disciples as a sign of the truth of his message.

Regarding the timing and contextual background of the revelation, it is a Medinan chapter, which means it is believed to have been revealed in Medina rather than Mecca.

The chapter's topics include animals which are forbidden, and Jesus and Moses's missions. Verse 90 prohibits "the intoxicant" (alcohol). Verse 8 contains the passage: "Do not let the hatred of a people lead you to injustice". Al-Tabligh Verse 67 is relevant to the Farewell Pilgrimage and Ghadir Khumm.^{[Quran 5:67]}

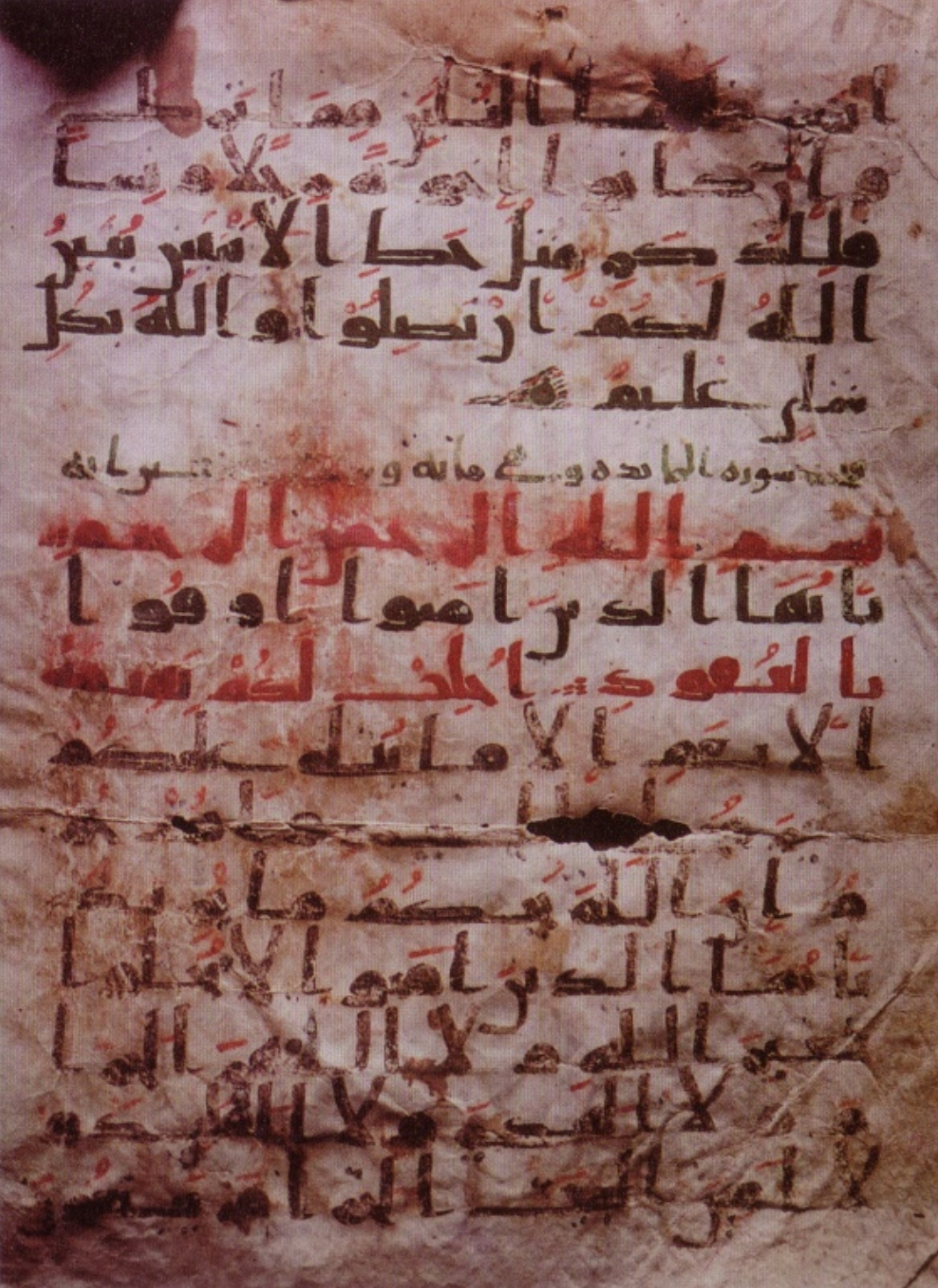
A page from an 8th century Quran. The black line between the red lines is the beginning of Surah Al-Mā'idah

== Summary ==
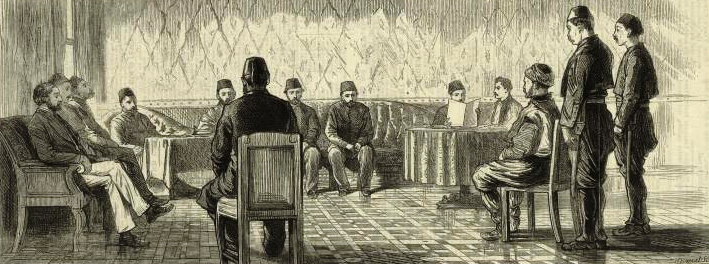
A trial in the Ottoman Empire, 1879, when religious law applied under the Mecelle

- 1 Covenants are to be fulfilled
- 2 Lawful meats
- 3 Islam completed
- 4 Food caught by hunting animals is permissible
- 5 Muslims permitted to eat the food of Jews and Christians, and to marry chaste Muslim, Jewish and Christian women.
- 6 The law of purifications
- 7–8 Believers reminded of the covenant of Aqabah, Muslims should bear true testimony and not let hatred nor prejudice prevent them from being just.
- 9–11 Muslims told to remember God's forgiveness and favour or forget old quarrels
- 12 God’s covenant with Children of Israel
- 13–16 The disobedience of Jews and Christians exposed.
- 17–18 Jews and Christians mutation of God's teachings.
- 19 Jews and Christians are not the children of God. Muhammad sent as a prophet to remind and warn those who have not read or believed The Books of The People of The Book.
- 20–26 Israel’s rebellion at Kadesh Barnea
- 27–31 The story of Cain and Abel
- 32 The sin of homicide
- 33–40 The penalty of theft and reminder to repent. God's judgment supersedes all.
- 41–44 Warning against distortion of Scripture and judging only by God's revelations.
- 45–55 Reiteration of Quran as confirmation of earlier Scriptures. Muhammad to judge by laws of Allah.
- 56–58 Not to seek guardianship of those who mock faith. Allying oneself only with God.
- 59–63 Hypocrites warned. Believers warned and instructed.
- 64–65 The Jews exhort and warned
- 66 The hypocrisy and unbelief of the jews and Christians rebuked
- 67–69 Muhammad required to preach. He attestes to Jewish and Christian Scriptures. Believing Jews, Sabians, and Christians to be saved
- 70–71 The Jews rejected and killed the prophets of God
- 72–75 Rejection of saying that Allah is "the third of three" (resembling Tritheism), that Allah is the Messiah (resembling Sabellianism), that Allah had Ezra or Jesus as offsprings.
- 76–77 Reiteration of one God, upholding principles and warning against extremism.
- 78–81 Disobedient Jews condemned by Christ.
- 82–87 Jewish and Christian beliefs compared. Righteous rewarded. Disobedient to be punished. Warnings against transgressions.
- 88 Muslims to use lawful food and be mindful of God
- 89 Expiation for perjury
- 90–94 Shunning of intoxicants and gambling.
- 95–96 Law concerning hunting and gaming during pilgrimage
- 97–101 Pilgrimage and its rites enjoined. Forgiveness of deeds done before laws established.
- 102–104 Arab customs denounced
- 105–108 Accountable for only one's action. Wills to be attested by witnesses.
- 109 The prophets ignorant of the characters of their followers, only God knower of all.
- 110 Jesus—his miracles—God’s favour to him
- 111 The apostles of Jesus were Muslims
- 112–115 A table provided by God for Jesus and the apostles.
- 116–118 Jesus did not teach his followers to worship him and his mother as deities apart Allah (resembling Collyridianism).
- 119 The reward of the true believer.
- 120 God is sovereign

== Placement and coherence with other surahs ==
The idea of textual relation between the verses of a chapter has been discussed under various titles such as nazm and munasabah in non-English literature and coherence, text relations, intertextuality, and unity in English literature. Hamiduddin Farahi, an Islamic scholar of the Indian subcontinent, is known for his work on the concept of nazm, or coherence, in the Quran. Fakhruddin al-Razi (died 1209 CE), Zarkashi (died 1392) and several other classical as well as contemporary Quranic scholars have contributed to the studies. The entire Quran thus emerges as a well-connected and systematic book. Each division has a distinct theme. Topics within a division are more or less in the order of revelation. Within each division, each member of the pair complements the other in various ways. The seven divisions are as follows:

Group	From	To	Central theme
1	Al-Fatiha 1:1	Al-Ma'idah 5:1	Islamic law
2	Al-An'am 6:1	At-Tawbah 9:1	The consequences of denying Muhammad for the polytheists of Mecca
3	Yunus 10:1	An-Nur 24:1	Glad tidings of Muhammad's domination
4	Al-Furqan 25:1	Al-Aḥzāb 33:1	Arguments on the prophethood of Muhammad and the requirements of faith in him
5	Saba 34:1	Al-Hujurat 49:1	Arguments on monotheism and the requirements of faith in Allah
6	Qaf 50:1	At-Tahrim 66:1	The requirement to have faith in Allah (God) God in Islam and the afterlife and that to Allah (God) is the final return
7	Al-Mulk 67:1	An-Nas 114:1	Admonition to the Quraysh about their fate in the Herein and the Hereafter if they deny Muhammad

== Exegesis ==
=== 3 Verse of Ikmal al-Din ===
"Today the disbelievers have given up all hope of ˹undermining˺ your faith. So do not fear them; fear Me! Today I have perfected your faith for you, completed My favour upon you, and chosen Islam as your way..."

— 5:3

This verse was revealed at Arafat according to the hadith:

Narrated 'Umar bin Al-Khattab: Once a Jew said to me, "O the chief of believers! There is a verse in your Holy Book Which is read by all of you (Muslims), and had it been revealed to us, we would have taken that day (on which it was revealed as a day of celebration." 'Umar bin Al-Khattab asked, "Which is that verse?" The Jew replied, "This day I have perfected your religion For you, completed My favor upon you, And have chosen for you Islam as your religion." 'Umar replied,"No doubt, we know when and where this verse was revealed to the Prophet. It was Friday and the Prophet (ﷺ) was standing at 'Arafat (i.e. the Day of Hajj)"

— Sahih al-Bukhari 45

=== 13 Breaking the covenant, distorting the Torah, and betrayal ===
In his commentary on verse 13 of Surah Al-Ma'idah, Al-Tabari states that some Jews would distort the Torah by writing things with their own hands and then presenting them to the unknowledgeable public as the Word of God and claiming they were part of the Torah revealed to Moses. God also cursed the Children of Israel for breaking their covenant. He goes on to say that the betrayal part of the verse refers to a group of Jews from Banu Nadir who intended to kill the Prophet; But God informed the Prophet of their plan.

=== 27–31 Cain and Abel ===
The story appears in the Quran 5:27–31:

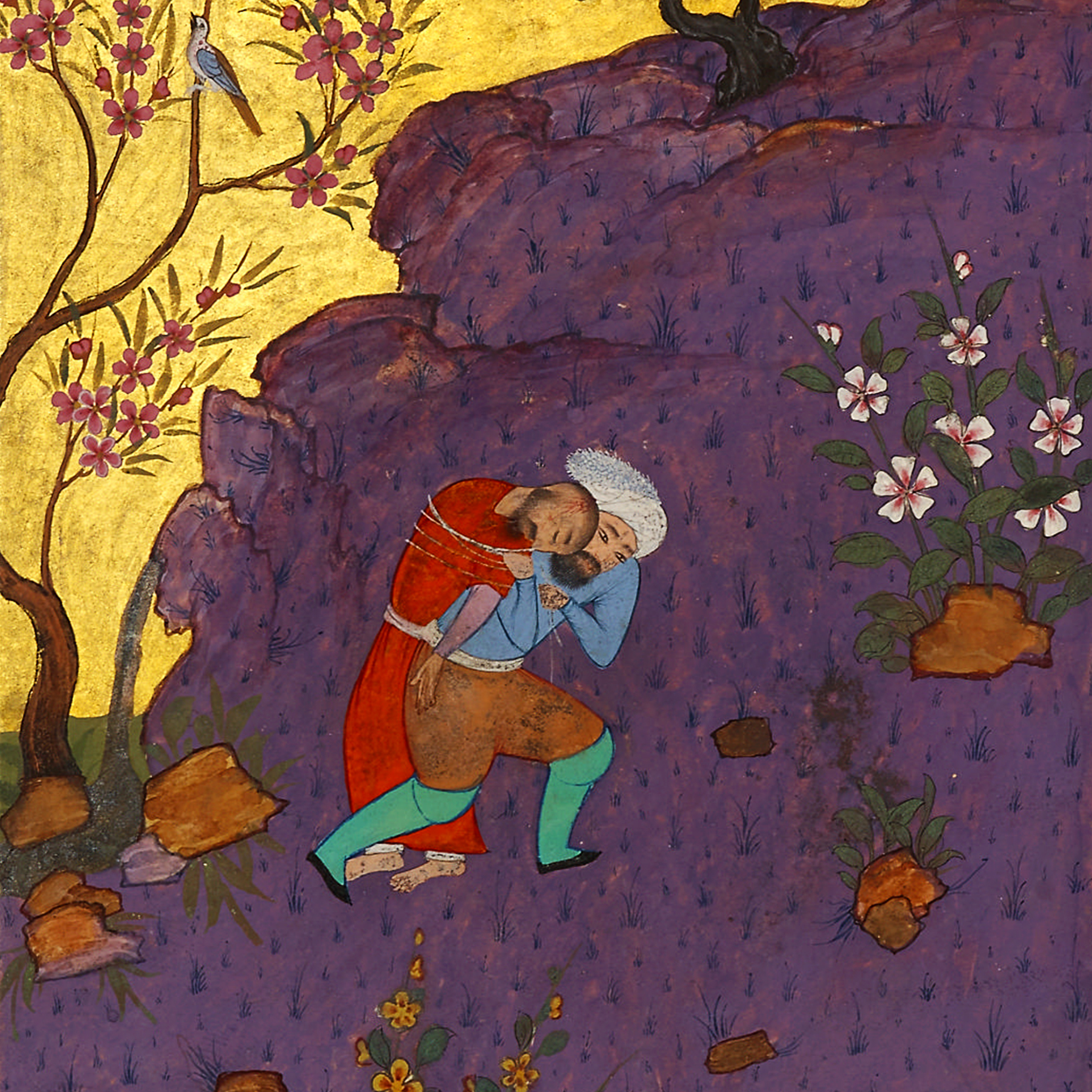
Islamic miniature of Cain carrying his murdered brother, Abel, to hide his corpse from God from an illuminated manuscript version of Stories of the Prophets.

5:27 Relate to them in truth ˹O Prophet˺ the story of Adam’s two sons—how each offered a sacrifice: Abel’s offering was accepted while Cain’s was not. So Cain threatened, “I will kill you!” His brother replied, “Allah only accepts ˹the offering˺ of the sincerely devout.
5:28 If you raise your hand to kill me, I will not raise mine to kill you, because I fear Allah—the Lord of all worlds.
5:29 I want to let you bear your sin against me along with your other sins, then you will be one of those destined to the Fire. And that is the reward of the wrongdoers.”
5:30 Yet Cain convinced himself to kill his brother, so he killed him—becoming a loser.
5:31 Then Allah sent a crow digging ˹a grave˺ in the ground ˹for a dead crow˺, in order to show him how to bury the corpse of his brother. He cried, “Alas! Have I ˹even˺ failed to be like this crow and bury the corpse of my brother?” So he became regretful.

— Quran 5:27–31

=== 32 On killing ===
Verses 5:32–33 have been quoted to denounce killing, by using an abbreviated form such as, "If anyone kills a person, it would be as if he killed the whole people: and if anyone saved a life, it would be as if he saved the life of the whole people". The same formulation appears in the Mishnah in Sanhedrin. A Mosaic columnist writing under the pseudonym Philologos, while noting "we have ordained" in the beginning of verse 32 recognizes the precept's origin in Rabbinic Judaism, interprets it also as an allusion to Sura 5 as a whole, in particular verse 18^{[Quran 5:18]}, delving into Islamic supercessionist beliefs that "[Jews and Christians do not] alone possess divine truth and are the sole objects of God’s concern", and so identifies the particular focus on "the Children of Israel" as an accusation of hypocrisy against their later Jewish successors "[not] act[ing] as if they were [responsible for the entire human race]". However, despite the entire Talmud being redacted by the 7th century, Philologos maintains that those involved in the canonization of the Quran had access to the original because of both the discovery that it did not contain an "in Israel" interpolation out of jurisdictional compliance by Jewish courts in Mishnaic time Palestine after an investigation by Israeli scholar of rabbinic thought Ephraim Urbach, and because of Philologos' expectation that it would be weaponized by them.

=== 33 Hirabah verse ===
This verse from Quranic chapter al-ma'idah (5:33) is known as the Hirabah verse (ayat al-hiraba), It specifies punishment for "those who wage war against Allah and His Messenger and strive to spread disorder in the land": The verbal noun form (i.e. ḥirabah) is frequently used in classical and modern books of Islamic jurisprudence, but neither the word ḥirabah nor the root verb ḥaraba occurs in the Quran. (Yuḥāribūna is the form used in Quran 5:33–34.)

According to early Islamic sources, the verse was revealed after some members of the Urayna tribe feigned conversion to Islam in order to steal Muslims' possessions and killed a young shepherd sent to teach them about the faith. In view of the broad and strong language of the verse, however, various state representatives beginning with the Umayyads have asserted that it applied to rebels in general.

The original meanings of the triliteral root ḥrb are to despoil someones wealth or property, and also fighting or committing sinful act. The Quran "refers to both meanings" in 2:279 and 5:33–34.

=== 51 Be wary of taking Jews and Christians as guardians ===
O believers! Take neither Jews nor Christians as guardians—they are guardians of each other. Whoever does so will be counted as one of them. Surely Allah does not guide the wrongdoing people.

Some Muslim hard liners have used verses such as this one to denounce close relationships with non-Muslims and forbidding non-Muslims from becoming leaders in Muslim countries. However, other Muslim scholars such as Shafi Usmani see this as forbidding only "indiscriminating intimacy" which might confuse the "distinctive hallmarks of Islam", while all other equitable relations as being allowed. Ghamidi in the context of his Itmam al-Hujjah interpretation of Islam, restricts the subjects of this verse to only the Jews and Christians of the Muslim Prophet's time. Others argue that only belligerent non-Muslims are being referenced here. Verse 51 is preserved in the Ṣan‘ā’1 lower text.

=== Verse 54 ===
O believers! Whoever among you abandons their faith, Allah will replace them with others who love Him and are loved by Him. They will be humble with the believers but firm towards the disbelievers, struggling in the Way of Allah; fearing no blame from anyone. This is the favour of Allah. He grants it to whoever He wills. And Allah is All-Bountiful, All-Knowing.

Some hadith view the 'beloved' in verse 54 as Abu Musa al-Ash'ari. Verse 54 is preserved in the Ṣan‘ā’1 lower text.

==== Shia' view ====
On the Shia interpretation of this verse, God used the singular form "waliyyukum" implying the "wilayah" (Guardianship of the believers) is a single project. In other words, the "wilayah" of the messenger and that of Ali springs from God's wilayah. The word "wali" in the context of this verse cannot mean "friend" because there is not a single verse in the Quran where God says that any one of his messengers is a friend or helper of their followers. Further if the verse implied "wilayah" in the sense of friend or helper, then the singular form "waliyyukum" would not have been used but the plural form "awliya'ukum" would be appropriate because the "friendship" of God is unique.

=== Verses 72 and 73 ===
Those who say, "Allah is the Messiah, son of Mary", have certainly fallen into disbelief. The Messiah ˹himself˺ said, "O Children of Israel! Worship Allah — my Lord and your Lord." Whoever associates others with Allah ˹in worship˺ will surely be forbidden Paradise by Allah. Their home will be the Fire. And the wrongdoers will have no helpers.
Those who say "Allah is one in a Trinity" have certainly fallen into disbelief. There is only One God. If they do not stop saying this, those who disbelieve among them will be afflicted with a painful punishment.

— Quran 5:72–73 ^{-The Clear Quran}

The Quran: An Encyclopedia notes that "The Quran’s objection to Christian practice is Christianity’s shirk, its worship of Jesus, Mary and the saints 'in derogation of Allah'. There is no justification in believing in the Trinity, for Jesus never would have condoned such a concept".

=== Verse 82 ===
in Verse 82 it says, "Verily, you will find the strongest among men in enmity to the believers the Jews and those who commit Shirk, and you will find the nearest in love to the believers those who say: "We are Christians."

=== Verse 90 ===
In Verse 90 it says, "O believers! Intoxicants, gambling, idols, and drawing lots for decisions are all evil of Satan’s handiwork. So shun them so you may be successful." This is a clear ruling in the Quran for Muslims to avoid intoxicants and gambling.

== See also ==
- Islamic view of the Trinity
- Shirk (Islam)
- Al-maryamiyyun
