= Al-An'am =

6th chapter of the Quran

Surah 6 of the Quran
ٱلْأَنْعَامْ Al-Anʿām The Cattle
- Qira'ah; English text
- Classification: Meccan
- Position: Juzʼ 7–8
- Hizb no.: 13–15
- No. of verses: 165
- No. of Rukus: 20
- No. of words: 3056
- No. of letters: 12,726

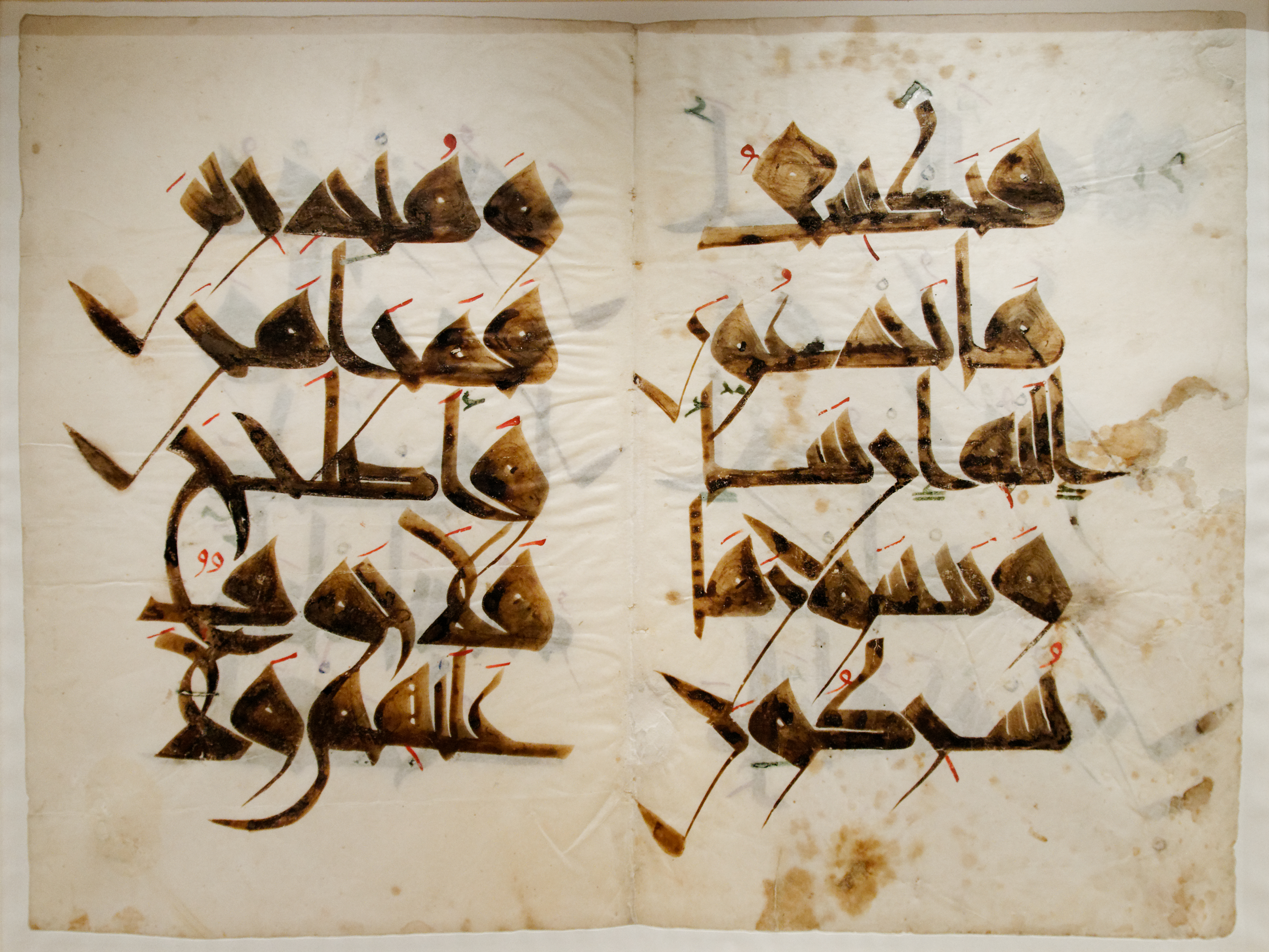
Bifolium from the Nurse's Quran (Mushaf al-Hadina) with fragment of the Surah Al-An'am. Kairouan, Zirid dynasty, 1020. Metropolitan Museum of Art

Al-An'am (Arabic: ٱلْأَنْعَامْ, al-ʾanʿām; meaning: The Cattle) is the sixth chapter (sūrah) of the Quran, with 165 verses (āyāt). Coming in order after Al-Fatiha, Al-Baqarah, Al 'Imran, An-Nisa', and Al-Ma'idah, this surah dwells on such themes as the clear signs of Allah's Dominion and Power, rejecting polytheism and unbelief, the establishment of Tawhid (pure monotheism), the Revelation, Messengership, and Resurrection. It is a Meccan surah and is believed to have been revealed in its entirety during the middle stage of the Meccan period of Islam. This explains the timing and contextual background of the believed revelation (Asbāb al-nuzūl). The surah also reports the story of Ibrahim, who calls others to stop worshiping celestial bodies and turn towards Allah.

== Summary ==
- 1–3 Praise to the Almighty and Omniscient Creator
- 4–5 The wilful unbelief of the Makkah infidels
- 6 They are threatened with the divine judgment
- 7 The people of Makkah hopelessly unbelieving
- 8–9 Why angels were not sent to the infidels
- 10–11 Those who rejected the former prophets were punished
- 12–18 Why the true God should be served
- 19 God the witness between Muhammad and the infidels
- 20 The Jews recognise Muhammad as a prophet
- 21–23 Idolaters on the judgment-day—their condition
- 24–29 Scoffing idolaters rebuked and threatened
- 30–31 The condition of believers and unbelievers after death
- 32–33 Unbelievers make God a liar
- 33 God's word and purposes unchangeable
- 34 Miracles of no avail to convince infidels
- 35 God will raise the dead to life
- 36 Why God did not grant the signs asked by unbelievers
- 37 Animals and birds to be brought into judgment
- 38 Infidels are deaf and dumb
- 39–40 Idolaters will call upon God in their distress
- 41–44 Adversity and prosperity alike unmeaning to infidels
- 45 God is the only helper in trouble
- 46–48 Unbelievers, if impenitent, sure to perish
- 49 Muhammad unacquainted with the secrets of God
- 50 There shall be no intercessor on the judgment-day
- 51–54 The motives of professing Muslims not to be judged
- 55–57 Muhammad declines the proposals of idolaters
- 58–61 God the Omniscient and Sovereign Ruler
- 62–64 God the Almighty Deliverer
- 65 Muhammad charged with imposture
- 66 Unbelievers will certainly be punished
- 67–69 Mockers to be avoided by Muslims
- 70–71 The punishment of idolaters certain and dreadful
- 71–74 Muslims commanded to obey God only
- 75–84 Abraham's testimony against idolatry
- 85–91 The prophets who succeeded Abraham
- 92 The unbelieving Jews (of Madína) rebuked
- 93 The Quran confirms the former Scriptures
- 94 The fate of those who forge Scriptures
- 95 Idolaters deserted by their gods on the judgment-day
- 96–100 The God of nature the true God
- 101–103 God has no offspring
- 104–105 God's favour in sending the Quran
- 106–108 The command to retire from Makkah
- 109 Muhammad not permitted to work miracles
- 110–113 The people of Makkah given over to unbelief
- 114 Muhammad the prophet of God
- 114–117 The direction of Muslims and idolaters contrasted
- 118–121 Law of permitted and forbidden meats
- 122 The righteous and unbelievers compared
- 122–125 wicked leaders of the people—conduct and punishment
- 126–127 The blessedness of the faithful
- 128–130 God's threatenings against unbelieving men and genii
- 131 God always warns men before punishing idolatry
- 132–133 Rewards and punishments shall be according to works
- 134 The punishment of unbelievers certain
- 135–136 The idolaters of Makkah rebuked
- 137–139 Evil customs of the Quraish exposed
- 140 The idolaters of Makkah threatened
- 141 The fruit of trees to be eaten
- 142–144 Controversy between the Quraish and Muhammad concerning forbidden meats referred to
- 145 The law concerning forbidden meats rehearsed
- 146 The Jewish law of forbidden meats
- 147 God will punish those who accuse the prophets of imposture
- 148–149 The idolaters of Makkah are reprobate
- 150 Their testimony unworthy of credit
- 151–153 Forbidden things rehearsed
- 154–157 The Quran attests the teaching of Moses and Jesus
- 158 The fate of the wicked on the judgment-day
- 159 Sectaries reproved
- 160 The reward of the righteous and wicked compared
- 161–162 Islam the true religion
- 163 Muhammad's self-consecration to God
- 164–165 The idolaters exhorted to believe in God

== Placement and coherence with other surahs ==
The idea of textual relation between the verses of a chapter has been discussed under various titles such as nazm and munasabah in non-English literature and coherence, text relations, intertextuality, and unity in English literature. Hamiduddin Farahi, an Islamic scholar of the Indian subcontinent, is known for his work on the concept of nazm, or coherence, in the Quran. Fakhruddin al-Razi (died 1209 CE), Zarkashi (died 1392) and several other classical as well as contemporary Quranic scholars have contributed to the studies. The entire Quran thus emerges as a well-connected and systematic book. Each division has a distinct theme. Topics within a division are more or less in the order of revelation. Within each division, each member of the pair complements the other in various ways. The seven divisions are as follows:

Group	From	To	Central theme
1	Al-Fatiha ^{[Quran 1:1]}	Al-Ma'ida ^{[Quran 5:120]}	Islamic law
2	Al-An'am ^{[Quran 6:1]}	At-Tawba ^{[Quran 9:129]}	The consequences of denying Muhammad for the polytheists of Mecca
3	Yunus ^{[Quran 10:1]}	An-Nur ^{[Quran 24:64]}	Glad tidings of Muhammad's domination
4	Al-Furqan ^{[Quran 25:1]}	Al-Ahzab ^{[Quran 33:73]}	Arguments on the prophethood of Muhammad and the requirements of faith in him
5	Saba ^{[Quran 34:1]}	Al-Hujraat ^{[Quran 49:18]}	Arguments on monotheism and the requirements of faith in Allah.
6	Qaf ^{[Quran 50:1]}	At-Tahrim ^{[Quran 66:12]}	Arguments on afterlife and the requirements of faith in it
7	Al-Mulk ^{[Quran 67:1]}	An-Nas ^{[Quran 114:6]}	Admonition to the Quraysh about their fate in the Herein and the Hereafter if they deny Muhammad

== Messengers who receive souls ==
Ibn Kathir interprets the 61st verse of Al-An'am, combined with a Hadith transmitted by Abu Hurairah and Ibn Abbas, that the Angel of death (Azrael) has assistants among angels who help him to take souls.
