= At-Tawbah =

9th chapter of the Quran

Surah 9 of the Quran
ٱلتَّوْبَة at-Tawbah The Repentance
- Qira'ah; English text
- Classification: Medinan
- Other names: Bara'ah ("Release")
- Position: Juzʼ 10 to 11
- Hizb no.: 19 to 21
- No. of verses: 129
- No. of Rukus: 16
- No. of words: 2505
- No. of letters: 11115

At-Tawbah (Arabic: ٱلتوبة, lit. 'the Repentance') is the ninth chapter (sura) of the Quran. It contains 129 verses (ayat) and is one of the last Medinan surahs. This Surah is also known as Bara'ah (Arabic: براءة, lit. 'Release'). It is called At-Tawbah in light of the fact that it articulates tawbah (repentance) and informs about the conditions of its acceptance (verse 9:102, 9:118). The name Bara'at (release) is taken from the opening word of the Surah.

It is believed by Muslims to have been revealed at the time of the Expedition of Tabuk in Medina in the 9th year of the Hijrah. The Sanaa manuscript preserves some verses, on parchment radiocarbon dated to between 578 CE (44 BH) and 669 CE (49 AH).

It is the only Surah of the Quran that does not begin with Bismillah, the usual opening formula, In the name of God, the All-Merciful, the All-Compassionate. It deals with almost the same topics as those dealt with in Surat al-Anfal. In contrast to all other surahs, the Islamic prophet Muhammad did not order that this formula should be put at the beginning of this surah. At-Tawba's verse 40 refers to Abu Bakr as thaniya ithnayn ('Second of the Two').

== Summary ==
- 1 Allah makes a declaration of disassociation from the polytheists.
- 2 they can travel freely for 4 months
- 3 It would be better if they repent
- 4 Polytheists who didn’t break any treaty are to be spared and treated with respect until time of treaty is over
- 5 After the sacred months have passed (the duration of the treaty), polytheists/idolaters may be killed, persecuted, and hunted without rest, but if they repent/convert, they are accepted/excused.
- 6 Any Polytheist who goes to Muslims and asks for protection is to be granted protection so they can hear the words of Allah
- 7 Polytheists who upheld treaties not to be harmed
- 8 Polytheists rebuked for not observing treaty believing they have the upper hand
- 9 Polytheists rebuked for exchanging the signs of Allah and averting from his way
- 10 Those who broke the treaties are the transgressors
- 11 If those who broke the treaties become Muslims they are regarded as brothers to the believers
- 12 If the disbelievers break their oaths Muslims are told to fight the leaders of disbelief
- 13 Muslims questioned if they will fight those who broke the treaty and attacked them first
- 14 Muslims are urged to fight in revenge against non-Muslims and Allah will punish them by their own hands and heal the chests of the believers
- 15 Allah removes the believer’s anger and accepts repentance from whom he wills
- 16 Believers questioned if they think Allah will not prove who truly strives in his cause
- 17-18 All but Muslims to be excluded from the sacred temples
- 19 Abbás rebuked for his vainglory
- 20-22 The Muhajirun assigned the first rank among Muslims—their reward
- 23-24 True believers to refuse friendship with nearest kin if they be infidels
- 25-27 The Battle of Hunayn victory due to God's help
- 28 Idolators excluded from the Kaaba
- 29 The Jews and Christians to be attacked (if they refuse to pay the Jizya tax)
- 30 Jews and Christians reproved and condemned for applying the epithet “Son of God” to Uzayr and Jesus
- 31-32 They take their priests, monks, as their lords, and accept Jesus as god beside Allah..
- 33 Islam is the only truth and a superior path to all other religions.
- 34-35 Stingy Muslims likened to covetous monks—their punishment
- 36 Infidels may be attacked in sacred months
- 37 The sacred months not to be transferred
- 38–41 Muslims exhorted to go on expedition to Tabuk by reference to God's help to Muhammad and Abu Bakr in the cave; Abu Bakr is referenced as thaniya ithnayn ('Second of the Two')
- 42 The lukewarm Muslims rebuked for wishing to stay at home
- 43 Muhammad rebuked for excusing some of these from going
- 44-46 Willingness to fight for Muhammad, a test of faith
- 47-50 Seditious Muslims rebuked
- 51-52 The sure reward of the faithful
- 53-55 God refuses the offerings of infidels and hypocrites
- 55 The wealth and prosperity of infidels a sign of their reprobation
- 56-57 Half-hearted Muslims reproved
- 58-59 Those who had spread libellous reports regarding Muhammad's use of alms rebuked
- 60 How alms should be expended
- 61-69 Grumblers and hypocrites threatened
- 70 They are warned by the example of the wicked in former ages
- 71-72 The faithful described—their rewards
- 73-74 Hypocrites denounced and threatened
- 76-78 Prosperity of infidels a prelude to their destruction
- 79 God shall scoff at the scoffers
- 80 The defamers of the faithful shall never be forgiven
- 81-83 Punishment of the “stayers at home”
- 84 Muhammad forbidden to pray at the grave of unbelievers and hypocrites
- 85-87 The Prophet not to wonder at the prosperity of the wicked
- 88-89 Reward of those who assist the Apostle in his wars
- 90 Hypocritical Arabs of the desert reproved
- 91-92 Who may lawfully remain at home in time of war
- 93-96 Other hypocrites reproved
- 97-98 The Bedouin, the worst of hypocrites
- 99 Some of them true believers
- 100 The reward of the Ansars and Muhájjirín
- 101 The desert Arabs and some of the people of Madína reproved
- 102-105 The penitent confessors in Madína are pardoned
- 106 Others await God's decision in their case
- 107-110 Denunciation against those who built a Masjid in opposition to Muhammad and his faithful ones
- 111-112 True believers are sold to God
- 113 Muslims not to pray for idolatrous relatives
- 114 Why Abraham prayed for his idolatrous parents
- 115-117 God merciful to the faithful
- 118 The three recreant Ansars pardoned
- 119-121 The people of Madína rebuked for want of loyalty to Muhammad
- 122 Some believers excused from going to war
- 123 True believers to war against neighbouring infidels and hypocrisy
- 124-127 Reproof of those who doubt the revelations of God and Muhammad
- 128-129 The Apostle trusts in the help of God

== Omission of Bismillah ==
Out of all 114 Surahs of the Quran this is the only one to which Bismillah is not prefixed. Among the explanations put forward for his not doing so, the most commonly accepted according to Unal is that, like the Islamic salutation, Peace be upon you, the expression, In the Name of God, the All-Merciful, the All-Compassionate conveys security and giving of quarter to those addressed. However, Surat at-Tawbah begins with an ultimatum to certain polytheists in Arabia. It deals, for the most part, with a re-evaluation of the relations with the polytheists who were frequently violating their agreements, the campaign to Tabuk, a disclosure of the intrigues of the hypocrites in Madinah^{(9:64-67, 101)}, the importance of jihad in God's cause^{(9:24)}, and relationships with the People of the Book.

== Sanaa manuscript folio 22, Q9:122–129 ==
Verses 122–129 are preserved in Folio 22 of the Sanaa manuscript. The sequence of Sanaa 1 chapters do not follow any other known quranic order and folio 22 is shared with Chapter 19 (Mary). Saudi-based experts in Quranic history emphasize that while Muhammad was alive, Quranic texts did not follow any standard sequence of surahs.

Folio 22, recto	Visible Traces	Reconstruction	Standard Text
Quran 9 (al-Tawbah), Verse 122; Line 3, p. 62	ما [كـ]ﺎ ﮞ	مَا كَانَ	وَمَا كَانَ
Quran 9:122; Line 4	مں كل ا ﻣﻪ	مِن كُلِّ أُمَّةٍ	مِن كُلِّ فِرْقَةٍ
Quran 9:124; Line 9	و ا د ا ا ٮر لٮ	وَإِذَا أُنزِلَتْ	وَإِذَا مَا أُنزِلَتْ
Quran 9:125; Line 12	ڡی ٯلو ٮهم ر حس	فِى قُلُوبِهِم رِجْسٌ	فِى قُلُوبِهِم مَرَضٌ
Quran 9:125; Line 13	ر حر ا ا لی ر ﺣﺴ[ﻬ]ـﻢ	رِجزاً إِلَىٰ رِجْسِهِمْ	رِجساً إِلَىٰ رِجْسِهِمْ
Quran 9:125; Line 13	و ما ٮو ا و هم ڡـ(ـﺴٯـ)[ـﻮ] ﮞ	وَمَاتُوا۟ وَهُمْ فَـٰسِقُونَ	وَمَاتُوا۟ وَهُمْ كَـٰفِرُونَ
Quran 9:126; Line 13	ا [و] / / ٮر و	أَوَلَا يَرَوْ	أَوَلَا يَرَوْنَ
Quran 9:126; Line 15	و لا ٮـ(ـٮـ)ـﺪ كر و ﮞ	وَلَا يَتَذَكَّرُونَ	وَلَا هُمْ يَذَّكَّرُونَ
Quran 9:127; Line 15	و ا د ا ا [ٮـ]ـﺮ (ﻟ)ـٮ	وَإِذَا أُنزِلَتْ	وَإِذَا مَا أُنزِلَتْ
Quran 9:127; Line 16	هل ٮر ٮٮا	هَلْ يَرَىٰنَا	هَلْ يَرَىٰكُم
Quran 9:127; Line 17	ڡا ٮـ[ـﺼ](ـﺮ) ڡـ(ـﻮ) ا	فَـﭑنصَرَفُوا	ثُمَّ انصَرَفُوا
Quran 9:127; Line 17	ڡصر ڡ ا ﻟـﻠـﻪ	فَــصَرَفَ اللهُ	صَرَفَ ٱللَّـهُ
Quran 9:127; Line 17	د لک ٮـ(ﺎ ٮـ)//[ـﻢ] (ٯـ)ـﻮ م لا ٮڡٯهو ﮞ	ذَٰلِكَ بِأَنَّهُمْ قَوْمٌ لَّا يَفْقَهُونَ	بِأَنَّهُمْ قَوْمٌ لَّا يَفْقَهُونَ
Quran 9:128; Line 18	و لٯد حا کم	وَلَقَدْ جَاءَكُمْ	لَقَدْ جَاءَكُمْ
Quran 9:128; Line 18	ر سو ل ﻣٮـ(ﮑ)ـﻢ	رَسولٌ مِنْكُمْ	رَسُولٌ مِنْ أَنْفُسِکُمْ
Quran 9:128; Line 19	عر ٮر (ﻋ)ﻠ[ـٮـ](ﻪ) ما عٮٮکم	عَزِيزٌ عَلَيْهِ مَا عَنَّتَكُمْ	عَزِيزٌ عَلَيْهِ مَا عَنِتُّمْ
Quran 9:129; Line 20	ڡا / / (ٮـ)ـﻮ لو ا [ﻋ](ـٮـ)ـﮏ	فَإن تَوَلَّوْا عَنْكَ	فَإن تَوَلَّوْا
Quran 9:129; Line 21	ا لد ی لا ا ﻟ[ﻪ] ا لا ﻫﻮ	الَّذي لَا إِلَـٰهَ إِلَّا هُوَ	لَا إِلَـٰهَ إِلَّا هُوَ

== Three Discourses ==
From opening up to the 37th ayat, the initial talk, was uncovered in Zil-Qa'adah A.H. 9. As the significance of the subject of the talk required its affirmation on the event of Hajj Muhammad dispatched Ali to follow Abu Bakr, who had just left for Makkah to lead the Pilgrims to the Ka'abah. He trained Ali to convey the talk before the representatives of the various clans of Arabia in order to advise them regarding the new policy guidelines pertinent to the mushriks.

Starting from ayat 38 up to 72nd ayat the subsequent talk was revealed during Rajab A.H. 9 or a little before this, when Muhammad was occupied with getting ready for the Campaign of Tabuk. The Believers were encouraged to take a dynamic part in Jihad, and the shirkers were seriously reproached for keeping down their riches and for wavering to forfeit their lives in the path for God due to their hypocrisy, powerless belief(iman) or carelessness.

The final section of ayaat 73rd to last, was uncovered on his return from the Campaign of Tabuk. There are a few pieces revealed in different events during the same time frame and were incorporated by Muhammad into the Surah as per instructions from God. This talk cautions the hypocrites of their malevolent deeds and censures those Believers who had remained behind in the Campaign of Tabuk. At that point in the wake of berating them, God exculpates those genuine Believers who had not partaken in the Jihad in the Way of Allah for one explanation or the other.

In the middle of the ayat 97 In other words, apart from hypocrisy, one of their defects is that they did not even keep in touch with the Muslims of Madinah through which they would have known the rules of Sharia.

That is, these people want the Muslims to fall into such a cycle of trouble that these people get freedom from the kind of commands that they find very difficult to follow. Especially on the occasion of the Battle of Tabuk, these people had the hope that this time the Muslims were facing the great power of Rome, so maybe this time they would lose all their power after being defeated by the Romans. Further, God said that in reality these people are lying in the cycle of self-hypocrisy, which will cause them to be disgraced both in this world and in the hereafter.

== Exegesis ==
=== Battle of Badr ===
Some parts of the chapter are believed to be speaking about the help of Allah by sending the invisible army of war, particularly mentioning the battle of Badr. According to Muhammad Sulaiman al-Ashqar from Islamic University of Madinah, who quoted several contemporary and classical scholars, the invisible army here were the Angels army consisted of Gabriel, Michael, Raphael (Note: found in Mustadrak al Sahihayn. The complete narration from Al-Hakim al-Nishapuri were:... Abu Abdullah Muhammad bin Yaqoub has reported from Ibrahim bin Abdullah Al-Saadi, who told us Muhammad bin Khalid bin Uthma, told us Musa bin Yaqoub, told me Abu Al-Huwairith, that Muhammad bin Jubayr bin Mut’im told him, that he heard Ali - may God be pleased with him - addresses the people, and he said: While I was leaving from the well of Badr, a strong wind came, the like of which I had never seen, then it left, then came a strong wind, the like of which I have never seen except for the one before it, then it went, then came a strong wind that I did not see before. I have never seen anything like it except for the one before it, and the first wind was Gabriel descended among a thousand angels with the Messenger of God - may God bless him and grant him peace - and the second wind was Michael who descended among a thousand angels to the right of the Messenger of God - may God bless him and his family and grant them peace - and Abu Bakr was On his right, and the third wind was Israfil. He descended with a thousand angels on the side of the Messenger of God - may God’s prayers and peace be upon him and his family - and I was on the right side. When God Almighty defeated his enemies, the Messenger of God - may God’s prayers and peace be upon him and his family - carried me on his horse, I blew up, and I fell On my heels, I prayed to God Almighty... Ibn al Mulqin, Hadith scholar from Cordoba of 13-14 AD century, evaluate this hadith tha he found weaknesses in Musa ibn Yaqoub and Abu al Huwairith chain, so he deemed there is weakness about this hadith. However, recent scholarship from Ali Hasan al-Halabi has noted there is another hadith which supported the participation of Raphael in Badr) (Note: According to Islamic belief in weak chain of Hadith, Raphael were acknowledged as angel who were tasked to blower of Armageddon trumpet, and one of archangels who bear the Throne of God on their back.) and thousands of best angels from the third level of heaven, all came to the battle of Badr by impersonating the appearance of Zubayr ibn al-Awwam, companion of Muhammad. (Note: According to one Hadith, Muhammad was told that the angels that appeared in the battle of Badr were highest in status and the "best of angels" according to Gabriel.) are deemed as his other personal virtue and venerable status according to Islamic belief. (Note: According to one narration, during the battle, Muhammad found an angel whom he though was Zubayr standing next to him, which then prompted Muhammad to command him to attack, to which the angel simply replied, "I am not Zubayr." Thus, according to one Hadith expert this is another indication that the angels truly came down with the appearance of Zubayr during Badr.) Meanwhile, Mahdi Rizqullah has compiled the commentary from classical Islamic scholars, that the verse narration about the angels attendance in the battle were also supported by hadiths from hadith collection from Muslim ibn Hajjaj, Ahmad ibn Hanbal, and the also from Quranic historiography work by Ibn Kathir. Muhammad Nasiruddin al-Albani gave commentary of another supportive narration from al-Baihaqi and Ibn Ishaq, through various hadith narration chains about the testimony from several different sahabah. This included the narration of Abbas ibn Abd al-Muttalib who at that time fought on the side of Qurayshite polytheist, who testified that he has been taken captive on the aftermath of the battle by a horse rider whom he did not recognize at all from Muslims rank. According to the hadith authority from Ahmad ibn Hanbal, The captor of Abbas were confirmed by Muhammad as one of the angel who helped the Muslims during this battle. (Note: Biography of the Prophet An Analytical Study Based on Authentic Sources by Mahdi Rizqullah which published in Indonesian language were praised by Jonathan E. Brockopp from Cambridge University Press for providing more details of Prophetic biography narration which does not offered by Mohammed Hussein Heikal biography works.)

=== Verses 9:2 - 9:6 ===
The Quran, chapter 9 (At-Tawba), verses 2–6:

- 9:2 “You ˹polytheists˺ may travel freely through the land for four months, but know that you will have no escape from Allah, and that Allah will disgrace the disbelievers.”
- 9:3 A declaration from Allah and His Messenger ˹is made˺ to all people on the day of the greater pilgrimage that Allah and His Messenger are free of the polytheists. So if you ˹pagans˺ repent, it will be better for you. But if you turn away, then know that you will have no escape from Allah. And give good news ˹O Prophet˺ to the disbelievers of a painful punishment.
- 9:4 As for the polytheists who have honoured every term of their treaty with you and have not supported an enemy against you, honour your treaty with them until the end of its term. Surely Allah loves those who are mindful ˹of Him˺.
- 9:5 But once the Sacred Months have passed, kill the polytheists ˹who violated their treaties˺ wherever you find them, capture them, besiege them, and lie in wait for them on every way. But if they repent, perform prayers, and pay alms-tax, then set them free. Indeed, Allah is All-Forgiving, Most Merciful.
- 9:6 And if anyone from the polytheists asks for your protection ˹O Prophet˺, grant it to them so they may hear the Word of Allah, then escort them to a place of safety, for they are a people who have no knowledge.

— Quran 9:2-6

9:5 is termed as the Sword Verse. The journalist Arun Shourie has criticized this and many other verses from the Quran contending that the Sunnah and the Hadith are equally evocative in their support of Jihad. Many mainstream Islamic scholars, however, assert that this verse relates to a very specific event in early Islamic history i.e. the covenant that was made and consecutively broken by the polytheist tribes of Mecca^{:74-91}. Some think they very easily bypass the fact that Quran is often quoted by Islamic scholars to be the book perfect for all times and all places and all humans, and if it is so, its verses never need a historical context at all. On the other hand, even if the Quran are not supposed to have a historic contextual explanation the context provided (such as the unfaithfulness in pacts and treatises) are mentioned in the previous verses, thus a part of the Quran itself instead of an "out-world" context relations. According to Asma Afsaruddin, citing various early exegetes' opinions regarding the Arab polytheists, the consensus among the earliest commentators has been that this does not translate into indiscriminate killing.^{:88-89}

Mujāhid said that this verse guarantees the safety of people in general (insān) who came to listen to the Prophet recite from the Qurān until they had returned to the place of refuge whence they came.
The Tanwīr al-miqbās says that the verse commands the Prophet to grant safe conduct to anyone from among the polytheists who asks for it, so that he may hear the recitation of the speech of God. If he does not believe (sc. embrace Islam), then he is to be granted safe passage back to his land (waṭanahu). This is so because they are people ignorant of the commandments of God and His oneness.

— Asma Afsaruddin, Striving in the Path of God: Jihad and Martyrdom in Islamic Thought, 2013, pp. 88-89

Similarly, Western Islam-scholar Rudolph F. Peters also asserts that indiscriminate killing is not supported in this verse.

=== Verse 9:29 ===
At-Tawbah also contains:

Fight against those who believe not in Allah, nor in the Last Day, nor forbid that which has been forbidden by Allah and His Messenger, and those who acknowledge not the religion of truth among the People of the Scripture, until they pay the Jizyah with willing submission, and feel themselves subdued.

Al-Rāzī (d. 606/1210), on this occasion quoted an early exegetical authority, Abū Rawq (d. 140/757), who explained that this verse was not a unilateral condemnation of all Jews and Christians, but those "who do not heed the prescriptions contained in the Torah and the Gospel, respectively". Similarly Al-Qurṭubī (d. 671/1273) "did not read into Qurān 9:29 a wholesale denunciation of the People of the Book as an undifferentiated collectivity".^{:278} Modern Muslim scholars like Muhammad Abduh shared similar views, agreeing that this verse was revealed on the occasion of the military campaign in Tabuk, and this verse specifically deals with the People of the Book", and also that "the only kind of legitimate war on which there is unanimity among Muslim scholars is the defensive war when proclaimed by the Imām in the event of an attack upon Muslim territory". The Grand Imam of al-Azhar from 1935 to 1945, Mustafa Al-Maraghi, notes that 9:29 means: "fight those mentioned when the conditions which necessitate fighting are present, namely, aggression against you or your country, oppression and persecution against you on account of your faith, or threatening your safety and security, as was committed against you by the Byzantines, which was what led to Tabuk."

=== Verse 9:103 ===
In Kitab al-Kafi, Ja'far al-Sadiq has narrated that Imams are not needy to what people own but rather collect religious tax on accord that Allah said, "Take from their wealth (religious tax) and charity by which you purify them and cause them to increase and invoke blessings upon them." Therefore, it is the people who need that the Imam accepts from them.

== Hadith ==
- Abu Ishaq said that he heard al-Bara' b. 'Azib say: The last complete sura revealed (in the Holy Quran) is Sura At-Tawbah (i e. al-Bara'at, ix.), and the last verse revealed is that pertaining to Kalala.
- Narrated Sa'id ibn Jubayr: I asked Ibn `Abbas about Surat At-Tawbah, and he said, "Surat Al-Tauba? It is exposure (of all the evils of the infidels and the hypocrites). And it continued revealing (that the oft-repeated expression): '...and of them ...and of them.' till they started thinking that none would be left unmentioned therein." I said, "What about) SuratAl-Anfal?" He replied, "Surat Al-Anfal was revealed in connection with the Battle of Badr." I said, "(What about) Surat Al-Hashr?" He replied, "It was revealed in connection with Banu Nadir."
- Narrated Zayd ibn Thabit Al-Ansari: who was one of those who used to write the Divine Revelation: Abu Bakr sent for me after the (heavy) casualties among the warriors (of the battle) of Yamama (where a great number of Qurra' were killed). `Umar was present with Abu Bakr who said, `Umar has come to me and said, The people have suffered heavy casualties on the day of (the battle of) Yamama, and I am afraid that there will be more casualties among the Qurra' (those who know the Quran by heart) at other battle-fields, whereby a large part of the Qur'an may be lost, unless you collect it. And I am of the opinion that you should collect the Qur'an." Abu Bakr added, "I said to `Umar, 'How can I do something which Allah's Apostle has not done?' `Umar said (to me), 'By Allah, it is (really) a good thing.' So `Umar kept on pressing, trying to persuade me to accept his proposal, till Allah opened my bosom for it and I had the same opinion as `Umar." (Zaid bin Thabit added:) `Umar was sitting with him (Abu Bakr) and was not speaking. me). "You are a wise young man and we do not suspect you (of telling lies or of forgetfulness): and you used to write the Divine Inspiration for Allah's Messenger. Therefore, look for the Qur'an and collect it (in one manuscript). " By Allah, if he (Abu Bakr) had ordered me to shift one of the mountains (from its place) it would not have been harder for me than what he had ordered me concerning the collection of the Qur'an. I said to both of them, "How dare you do a thing which the Prophet has not done?" Abu Bakr said, "By Allah, it is (really) a good thing. So I kept on arguing with him about it till Allah opened my bosom for that which He had opened the bosoms of Abu Bakr and `Umar. So I started locating Qur'anic material and collecting it from parchments, scapula, leaf-stalks of date palms and from the memories of men (who knew it by heart). I found with Khuza`ima two Verses of Surat At-Tawbah which I had not found with anybody else, (and they were):-- "Verily there has come to you an Apostle (Muhammad) from amongst yourselves. It grieves him that you should receive any injury or difficulty He (Muhammad) is ardently anxious over you (to be rightly guided)" (9.128) The manuscript on which the Qur'an was collected, remained with Abu Bakr until Allah took him unto Him, and then with `Umar till Allah took him unto Him, and finally it remained with Hafsa, `Umar's daughter.

== Placement and coherence with other surahs ==
The idea of textual relation between the verses of a chapter has been discussed under various titles such as nazm and munasabah in non-English literature and coherence, text relations, intertextuality, and unity in English literature. Hamiduddin Farahi, an Islamic scholar of the Indian subcontinent, is known for his work on the concept of nazm, or coherence, in the Quran. Fakhruddin al-Razi (died 1209 CE), Zarkashi (died 1392) and several other classical as well as contemporary Quranic scholars have contributed to the studies. The entire Quran thus emerges as a well-connected and systematic book. Each division has a distinct theme. Topics within a division are more or less in the order of revelation. Within each division, each member of the pair complements the other in various ways. The seven divisions are as follows:

Group	From	To	Central theme
1	Al-Fatiha ^{[Quran 1]}	Al-Ma'ida ^{[Quran 5]}	Islamic law
2	Al-An'am ^{[Quran 6]}	At-Tawba ^{[Quran 9]}	The consequences of denying Muhammad for the polytheists of Mecca
3	Yunus ^{[Quran 10]}	An-Nur ^{[Quran 24]}	Glad tidings of Muhammad's domination
4	Al-Furqan ^{[Quran 25]}	Al-Ahzab ^{[Quran 33]}	Arguments on the prophethood of Muhammad and the requirements of faith in him
5	Saba ^{[Quran 34]}	Al-Hujurat ^{[Quran 49]}	Arguments on monotheism and the requirements of faith in it
6	Qaf ^{[Quran 50]}	At-Tahrim ^{[Quran 66]}	Arguments on afterlife and the requirements of faith in it
7	Al-Mulk ^{[Quran 67]}	An-Nas ^{[Quran 114]}	Admonition to the Quraysh about their fate in the Herein and the Hereafter if they deny Muhammad

== See also ==
- Repentance in Islam
- Salat al-Tawbah

== Appendix ==
=== Bibliography ===
- Abasoomar, Moulana Muhammad; Abasoomar, Moulana Haroon (2016). "Virtue of Sayyiduna Zubayr (radiyallahu 'anhu)". Hadith Answers. Darul Hadith.
- Bin Al-Hassan, Abi Al-Qasim Ali; Al-Dimashqi, Ibn Asaker (2012). تاريخ مدينة دمشق 1-37 ج10 [History of the city of Damascus]. Dar Al Kotob Al Ilmiyah دار الكتب العلمية.
- Rizqullah, Ahmad Mahdi (2005). A Biography of the Prophet of Islam In the Light of the Original Sources, an Analytical Study · Volume 1. Darussalam Publishers. p. 410. ISBN 9789960969022.
- Sadeghi, Behnam; Goudarzi, Mohsen (2012). "Ṣan'ā' 1 and the Origins of the Qur'ān". Der Islam. 87 (1–2). Berlin: De Gruyter: 1–129. doi:10.1515/islam-2011-0025. S2CID 164120434.
- Muir, William (1878). The Life of Muhammad from Original Sources. Princeton University.
