= Yunus (surah) =

10th chapter of the Qur'an

Surah 10 of the Quran
يُونُس Yūnus Jonah
- Qira'ah; English text
- Classification: Meccan
- Position: Juzʼ 11
- Hizb no.: 21 to 22
- No. of verses: 109
- No. of Rukus: 11
- No. of words: 1839
- No. of letters: 7589

Yunus (Arabic: يونس, Yūnus; Arabic synonym of "Jonas" or "Jonah"), is the 10th chapter (surah) of the Quran with 109 verses (ayat). Yunus is named after the prophet Yunus (Jonah). According to tafsir chronology (asbāb al-nuzūl), it is believed to have been revealed before the migration of the Islamic prophet Muhammed and his followers from Mecca to Medina (Hijra). As such, it is known as a Meccan surah.

Surah Yunus is the first of six surahs which open with the tri-letters alif, lam and ra'.

== Summary ==
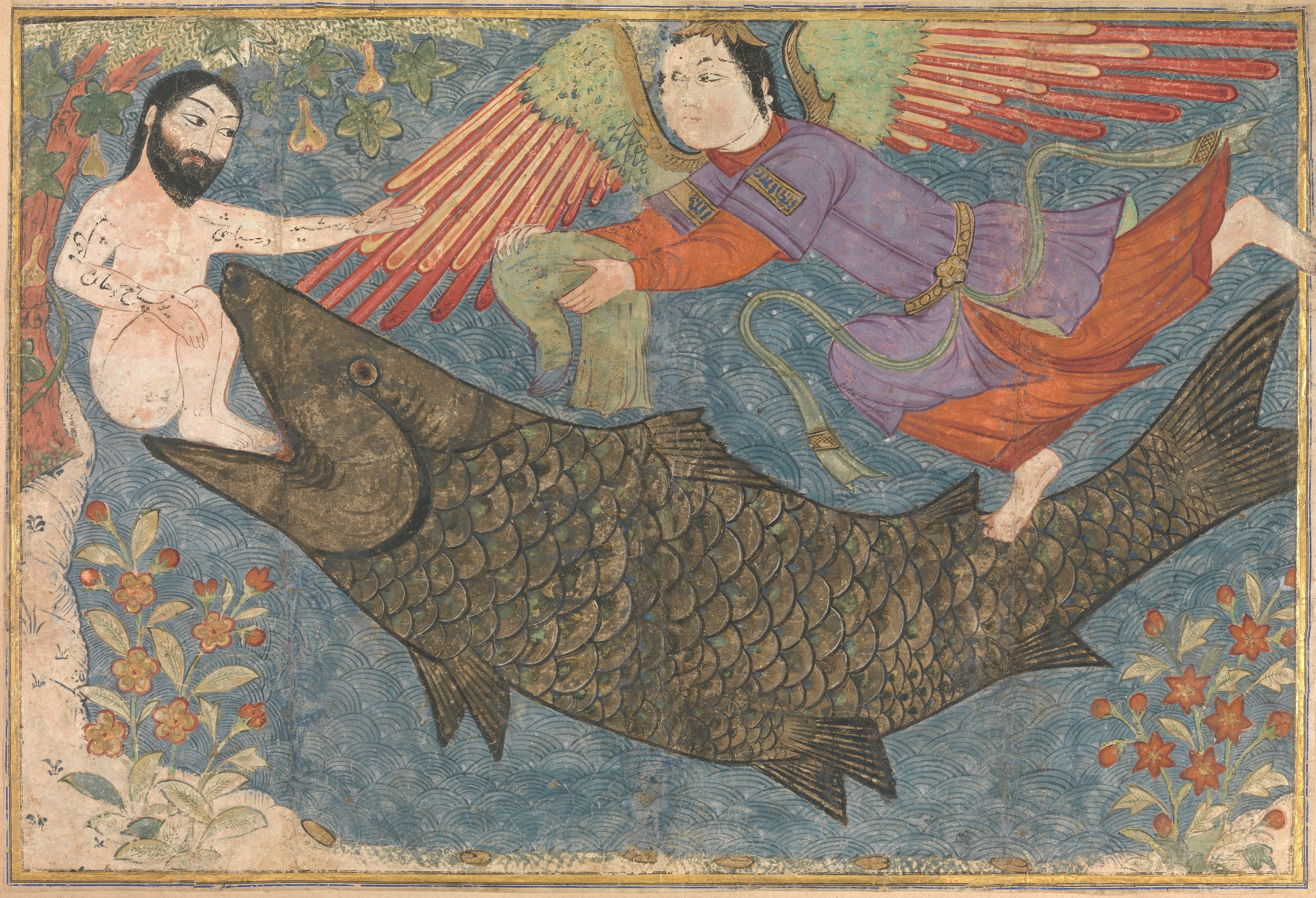
Jonah and the giant fish in the Jami' al-tawarikh (c. 1400), Metropolitan Museum of Art

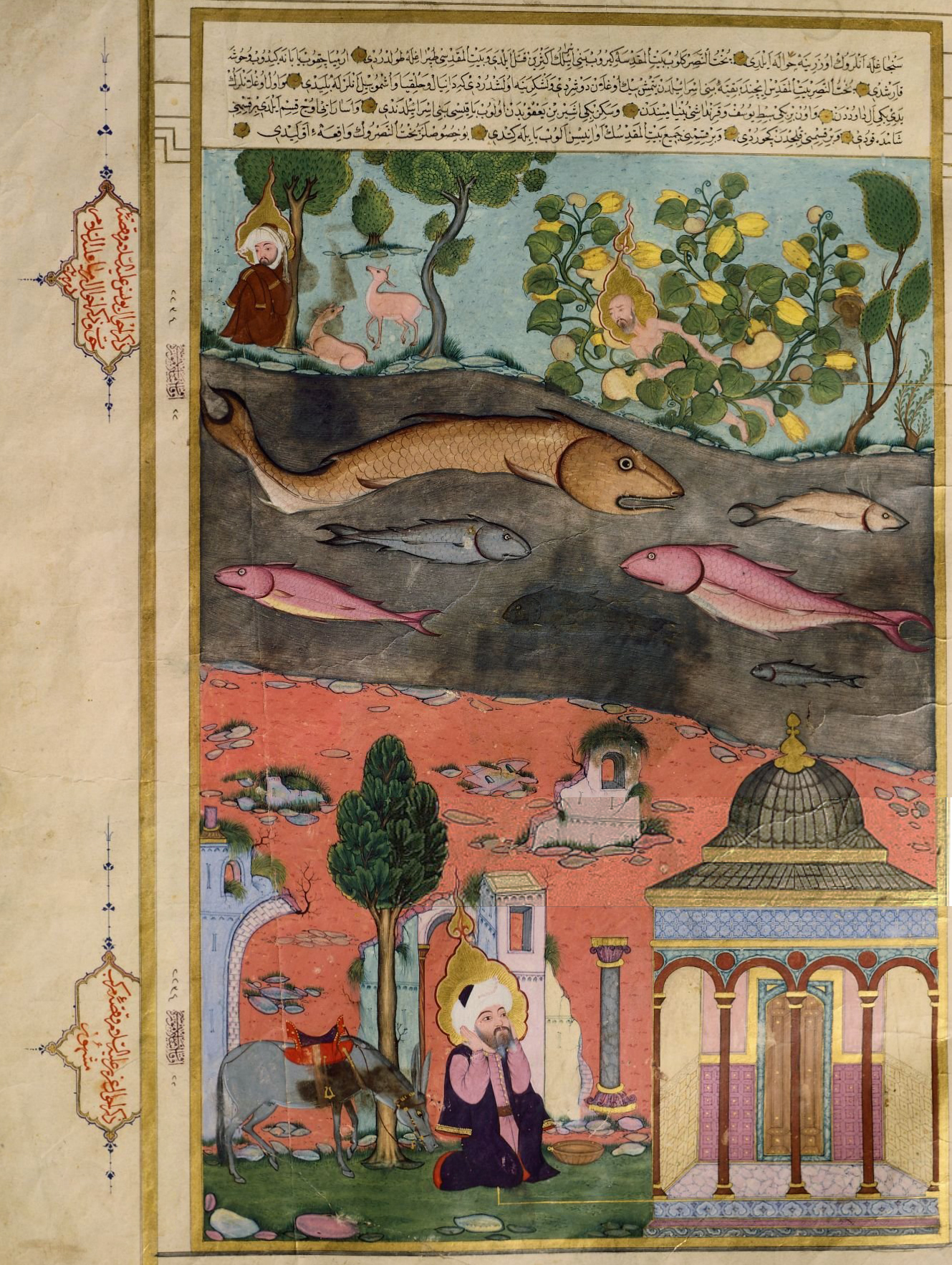
Jonah (top-right) in the 1583 Ottoman manuscript Zubdat al-Tawarikh.

The initial verses of the chapter (1–70) present an argumentative dialogue between Islam and its unbelievers. The remaining verses contain the stories of Noah, Moses and Jonah, all considered prophets in Islam.

- 1-2 The Makkans charge their Prophet with sorcery because he is a man from among them
- 3 The Creator and Ruler of the universe the only true God
- 4 Believers rewarded at death for good deeds
- 4 Unbelievers punished after death
- 5-6 God's works are signs to all men
- 7-11 Rewards and punishments of the faithful and the unbelieving
- 12 People stop thanking God when there is no need.
- 13 Men pray to God in affliction, but forget Him with the return of prosperity
- 14-15 The people of Makkah warned by the example of former generations
- 16-18 The Quraysh desire a different Quran — Muhammad protests his inability to alter it
- 19 Idolaters trust intercessors who can neither profit nor harm them
- 20 All men originally professed one religion
- 21 The people demand of Muhammad a sign
- 22 When men despise the judgments of God he threatens greater suffering
- 23-24 Unbelievers remember God in distress by land and sea, but forget Him when delivered
- 25 Life likened to water which sustains vegetable life
- 26-28 Paradise for Muslims and hell for the infidels
- 29-31 Idolaters will be deserted by their gods in the judgment-day
- 32-37 Idolaters exhorted to worship him whom they recognise as their Creator, Preserver, and Governor
- 38 The Quran no forgery; it confirms the former Scriptures
- 39-40 Those who charge Muhammad with imposture challenged to produce a chapter like it
- 41 Some believe in the Quran, others reject it
- 42-47 The unbelieving Quraish declared to be reprobate
- 48 An apostle is sent to every nation
- 49 Unbelievers mock at the threatenings of their prophet
- 50 Every nation has its fixed period of existence
- 51-55 Infidels will believe when their punishment comes upon them
- 56-57 God is the Author of life and death
- 58-59 The Quran an admonition and direction to the unbelievers
- 60-61 Lawful food not to be prohibited
- 62 Muhammad ever under Divine guidance
- 63-65 The blessedness of those who believe and fear God
- 66-68 Unbelievers cannot harm the Prophet
- 69-71 Those rebuked who say that God hath begotten children
- 72-75 Muhammad likened to Noah and other prophets
- 76 Moses and Aaron sent to Pharaoh and his princes
- 77-82 They are rejected as sorcerers and perverters of the national religion
- 83 A few of the people only believe on them
- 84-86 Moses and Aaron with the believers put their trust in God
- 87 The Israelites commanded to be constant in prayer to God
- 88-89 Moses's prayer, that God would destroy the Egyptians, is heard
- 90 Pharaoh and his people drowned in the sea
- 90-92 He repents and is raised out of the sea for a sign to the people
- 93 The Israelites are provided with a habitation and blessing
- 94-95 Jews and Christians appealed to in confirmation of the statements of the Quran
- 96-98 No kind of miracle will suffice to make the reprobate believe
- 99-103 Infidels do not believe on Muhammad because God does not permit them to do so
- 104-107 The people of Makkah exhorted to accept the true orthodox faith
- 108 Muhammad not responsible for the faith or unbelief of the people
- 109 The Prophet exhorted to be patient

The chapter presents the Meccan pagans' objections against the Quran, and responds to them. The pagans said that Muhammad was a "manifest sorcerer" and that he fabricated the Quran. They also challenged Muhammad to immediately bring the punishment of God, if his claim was true. They also demanded that Muhammad change the Quran to no longer condemn their practice of idolatry and using intercessors when worshipping God.

The chapter's response to these objection is a mix of "argument, threat, promise and reproach". It defends the Quran's divine origin, not a fabrication of Muhammad's, and says that Muhammad could not change it even if he wanted to. As for the challenge to bring God's punishment, the chapter says that God may defer punishment in this world if he wants to. It also tells of the punishment against unbelievers in the past, such as the people of Noah and Moses. It says that if the pagans waited for the punishment before believing, it would be too late, as was the case with the Pharaoh of Moses. According to the Quran, the Pharaoh only believed in God just before drowning, and that belief was too late and did not benefit him.

The chapter also mentions the People of Jonah, who at first rejected Jonah's message, but then repented and believed. Therefore, unlike the people of Noah and Moses, they were averted from God's punishment. The mention of Jonah in verse 98 gives the chapter its name. The chapter then instructs Muhammad if he had any doubt about the truth of what was revealed to him, he could ask other People of the Book (i.e. the Jews and the Christians) who would be able to confirm the Quran's account of these people of the past.

== Revelation ==
According to the Islamic tradition, the chapter is predominantly revealed during the Meccan phase (610–622) of Muhammad's prophethood (before his move to Medina), therefore, a Meccan sura. Based on its context, some verses appeared to date to when Muhammad just started his call to Islam. According to the fifteenth century commentary Tafsir al-Jalalayn, some said that the surah was revealed sometime after Muhammad's Night Journey (c. 621). Verses 40 and 94–96 appeared to be an exception and were revealed in Medina. The congruity of the topic unmistakably shows this doesn't contain separated sections or talks that were uncovered at various occasions or on various events. Actually, it is, from the starting point to end, a firmly associated talk which more likely than not been uncovered at one sitting. Other than this, the nature of its subject is itself a reasonable confirmation that the Surah has a place with the Makkan time frame.

We have no tradition as to the hour of its disclosure, yet its topic gives a clear sign that it probably been uncovered during the last phase of Muhammad's living at Makkah. For the method of the talk recommends that at the hour of its disclosure, the hostility of the rivals of the Message had become so exceptional that they couldn't endure even the nearness of Muhammad and his supporters among themselves, and that left no expectation that they could ever comprehend and acknowledge the message of Muhammad. This shows the last admonition like in this surah had to be given. These attributes of the talk are clear confirmation that it was uncovered during the last phase of the movement at Makkah.

Something else that decides all the more explicitly for the Surahs of the last stage at Makkah is the notice (or nonattendance) of some open or incognito insight about Hijrat (Emigration) from Makkah. As this Surah doesn't contain any clue at about this, it is a proof that it was revealed before those surahs which contain it.

== Name ==
The chapter is named after Jonah who was known as Yunus in the Islamic tradition, who is mentioned in the verse 98. Despite the chapter being named after him, this verse is the only one (out of 109) where the chapter mentions him. This is not unusual in the Quran, a chapter's name is usually taken from a prominent or unusual word in it, which might or might not relate to its subject matter.

== Principal subjects ==
The first ayat 10:1 contains greeting towards the Right Way is reached out to the individuals who were thinking about it a strange thing that Allah's message was being presented on by a person (Muhammad). They were accusing Muhammad of witchcraft, though there is neither anything strange in it nor makes them anything to do with magic or soothsaying. Muhammad is just educated humanity these two realities:

- Allah, Who has made the universe, is, indeed, your Rabb, and He Alone is qualified for be worshipped.
- That after the life right now, will be another life in the following scene, where you will need to render full record of this current world's life. You will be compensated or rebuffed by whether you adopt the righteous attitude required by Allah in the wake of recognizing Him as your Rabb, or act against His commandments.

Both of these realities will be real factors in themselves, regardless of whether you recognize them in that capacity or not. On the off chance that you acknowledge these, you will have an extremely honored end; else you will meet the shrewd outcomes of your offenses. The significant issues, divine laws, and instructions in the surah can be listed as follows:-

1. Allah is the only Creator of this universe.
2. Deities worshiped by mushrikin, other than Allah, have no capacity to either profit or mischief anybody.
3. Deities other than Allah are not in any case mindful that they are being worshiped.
4. Allah sent a Rasool for guidance to each nation.
5. Al-Qur'an gives a fix to all the issues of humankind.
6. Mushrikin follow only guesses and
7. The tale of the Prophet Nuh and his kin.
8. The tale of the Prophet Musa, Fir'on, and his chiefs.
9. Believing in the wake of seeing the scourge didn't profit any nation aside from the people of the Prophet Yunus.
10. Forbiddance against compelling anybody to change over to Islam.

== Exegesis ==
=== Verse 10:25 ===
And Allah invites ˹all˺ to the Home of Peace and guides whoever He wills to the Straight Path.

The ideal society according to the Quran is Dar as-Salam, literally, "the house of peace" of which it intones: And Allah invites to the 'abode of peace' and guides whom He pleases into the right path.

=== Verse 10:101 ===
It is narrated that when Ja'far al-Sadiq was asked about verse [10:101]: ...the signs and warnings are of no avail to the disbelieving people, he replied the signs are the Imams and the warnings are the Prophets.

== Placement and coherence with other surahs ==
The idea of textual relation between the verses of a chapter has been discussed under various titles such as nazm and munasabah in non-English literature and coherence, text relations, intertextuality, and unity in English literature. Hamiduddin Farahi, an Islamic scholar of the Indian subcontinent, is known for his work on the concept of nazm, or coherence, in the Quran. Fakhruddin al-Razi (died 1209 CE), Zarkashi (died 1392) and several other classical as well as contemporary Quranic scholars have contributed to the studies. The entire Qur'an thus emerges as a well-connected and systematic book. Each division has a distinct theme. Topics within a division are more or less in the order of revelation. Within each division, each member of the pair complements the other in various ways. The seven divisions are as follows:

Group	From	To	Central theme
1	Al-Fatiha ^{[Quran 1:1]}	Al-Ma'ida ^{[Quran 5:1]}	Islamic law
2	Al-An'am ^{[Quran 6:1]}	At-Tawba ^{[Quran 9:1]}	The consequences of denying Muhammad for the polytheists of Mecca
3	Yunus ^{[Quran 10:1]}	An-Nur ^{[Quran 24:1]}	Glad tidings of Muhammad's domination
4	Al-Furqan ^{[Quran 25:1]}	Al-Ahzab ^{[Quran 33:1]}	Arguments on the prophethood of Muhammad and the requirements of faith in him
5	Saba ^{[Quran 34:1]}	Al-Hujraat ^{[Quran 49:1]}	Arguments on monotheism and the requirements of faith in it
6	Qaf ^{[Quran 50:1]}	At-Tahrim ^{[Quran 66:1]}	Arguments on afterlife and the requirements of faith in it
7	Al-Mulk ^{[Quran 67:1]}	An-Nas ^{[Quran 114:1]}	Admonition to the Quraysh about their fate in the Herein and the Hereafter if they deny Muhammad

== Bibliography ==
- Johns, A. H. (2003). "Jonah in the Qur'an: An Essay on Thematic Counterpoint". Journal of Qur'anic Studies. 5 (2). Edinburgh University Press: 48–71. doi:10.3366/jqs.2003.5.2.48. JSTOR 25728109.
- Seyyed Hossein Nasr; Caner K. Dagli; Maria Massi Dakake; Joseph E.B. Lumbard; Mohammed Rustom, eds. (2015). The Study Quran: A New Translation and Commentary. New York, NY: HarperCollins. ISBN 978-0-06-112586-7.
