= Al Hijr =

Al Hijr may refer to:

- Al-Hijr (sūrah), the 15th chapter of the Quran
- Mada'in Saleh, a pre-Islamic archaeological site, occasionally called Al-Hijr, or Hegra
- The area inside the hatim, a low semi-circular wall opposite, but not connected to, the north-west wall of the Kaaba known as the hatīm
