= Az-Zumar =

39th chapter of the Qur'an

Surah 39 of the Quran
الزمر Az-Zumar The Troops
- Qira'ah; English text
- Classification: Meccan
- Position: Juzʼ 23 to 24
- No. of verses: 75
- No. of Rukus: 8
- No. of words: 1177
- No. of letters: 4869

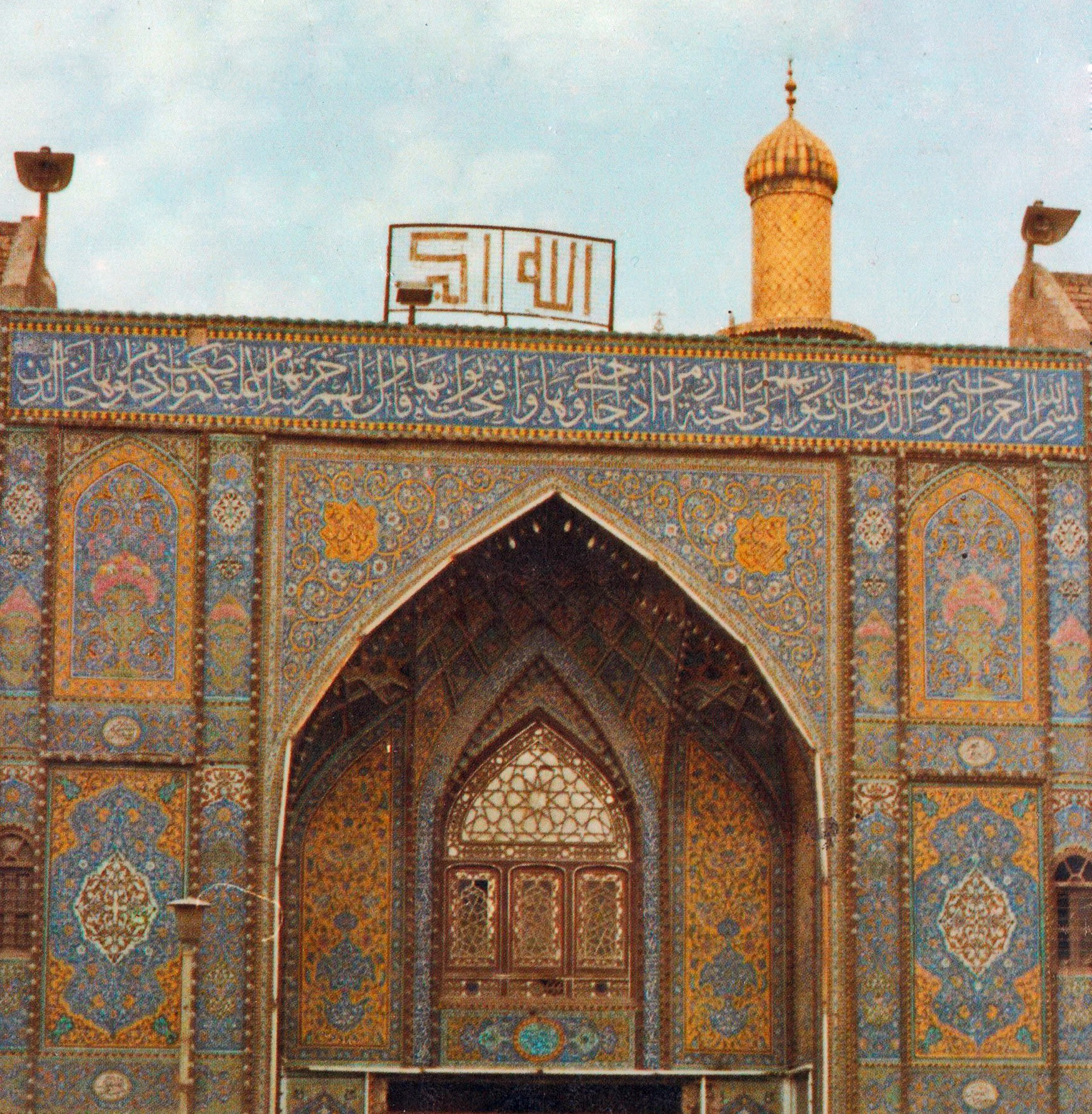
Some famous verses of Az-Zumar seen in the tilings of Imam Ali Mosque in Najaf, Iraq, 1994.

Az-Zumar (Arabic: الزمر, ’az-zumar; meaning: "The Troops, The Throngs") is the 39th chapter (surah) of the Qur'an, the central religious text of Islam. It contains 75 verses (ayat). This surah derives its name from the Arabic word zumar (troops) that occurs in verses 71 and 73. Regarding the timing and contextual background of the believed revelation (asbāb al-nuzūl), it is believed to have been revealed in the mid-Meccan period when persecutions of the Muslim believers by the polytheists had escalated.

The surah expounds the signs of God's Oneness (tawhid) in the natural world and emphasizes the absurdity of associating partners with God. It also hints at emigration for the believers who were suffering great difficulties in worshiping God in their homeland. It also declares that there can be no reconciliation between believing in God's Oneness and association partners with God. The chapter also reminds readers of the other world, where Muslims believe people will see the outcome of their own deeds.

== Summary ==
- 1 The Quran a revelation from God to Muhammad
- 2-3 Muhammad to exhibit a pure religion to God
- 4-5 God will not show favour to idolaters
- 6 God Hath not chosen to have a son
- 7-8 God manifest in His works of creation and providence
- 9-10 God is Sovereign in His dealings with men
- 11 The ingratitude of idolaters
- 12 The righteous and wicked not equal before God
- 13 The righteous shall be rewarded
- 14-16 Muhammad, the first Muslim, must exhibit the pure religion of God
- 17-18 The loss of the idolaters
- 19 Idolaters who repent shall be rewarded
- 20 Muhammad cannot deliver the reprobate
- 21 The reward of the faithful
- 22 God revealed in the growth and decay of Nature
- 23 The Muslim and the infidel not equal
- 24 The Quran first frightens, then comforts, the Muslims
- 25 The punishment of the wicked in hell
- 26 Former infidels punished for maligning their prophets
- 27-30 Every kind of parable in the Quran
- 31-32 Muhammad and the infidels shall debate before the Lord
- 33-36 The reward and punishment of believers and unbelievers
- 37 The infidels of Makkah threaten Muhammad
- 37-38 True believers shall be rightly directed
- 39 Idolaters acknowledge God as creator
- 40-42 Muhammad yet to be vindicated
- 43 God shall raise the dead as he raiseth from sleep
- 44-45 None can intercede except by God’s permission
- 46 Idolaters dread God but joy in their false gods
- 47 God shall judge between the faithful and the idolaters
- 48 Idolaters will give two worlds to escape God's wrath
- 49-50 They shall not escape the evils of the Judgement Day
- 51-52 The infidels of former times were punished
- 52-53 The idolaters of Makkah shall not escape
- 54-56 Idolaters exhorted to repent; their sin will be forgiven
- 57-59 The regrets of the impenitent at the Judgement Day
- 60-61 God shall reject their apologies and blacken their faces for the ones who lied. (Warning verse to those who lie about God).
- 62 But He will save the righteous
- 63 God the Sovereign Ruler of heaven and earth
- 64-66 Muhammad cannot worship idols, seeing he has received a revelation from God
- 67 The resurrection and the Judgement Day, fearful scenes of Qiyamah
- 68 The blowing of the Armageddon trumpet, when every creatures and creations will meet their death, except those chosen by Allah to survive the Qiamah According to several tafsir scholars, the creature who destined to survive from the Armageddon trumpet blow were Israfil, an archangel who blow the trumpet himself. Israfil were also said to be one of gigantic archangels who bear the throne of Allah. According to a Hadith sourced from Anas ibn Malik which narrated by Ibn Mawardayh and al-Firyabi, Al-Suyuti narrated those who survived from the blow of the Israfil trumpet were Israfil, Jibril, Mikail, Bearers of the Throne, and the Archangel of death.
- 69 The resurrection and the Judgement Day, fearful scenes of Qiyamah
- 70-73 Troop of the righteous and wicked, their reward and punishment
- 74-75 God shall be praised by righteous men and angels

== Exegesis (tafsir) ==
=== 9:5 He wraps the night over the day ===
Translation: He created the heavens and earth in truth. He wraps the night over the day and wraps the day over the night and has subjected the sun and the moon, each running [its course] for a specified term. Unquestionably, He is the Exalted in Might, the Perpetual Forgiver.

According to Turkish writer Ali Ünal: the word "wraps" in this verse is a simile, which alludes both to the earth's being rounded and to differences in the times of sunrise and sunset.
