= Juz' =

Any of the 30 parts of the Quran

A juzʼ (Arabic: جُزْءْ; pl.: أَجْزَاءْ, ajzāʼ; lit. 'part') is one of thirty parts of varying lengths into which the Quran is divided. It is also known as parah (Persian: پَارَه) in Iran and subsequently the Indian subcontinent (Bengali: পারা). There are 30 ajzāʼ in the Quran, also known in Urdu as سِپَارَہ (sipārah), meaning "thirty parts" (from Persian si meaning thirty).

During medieval times, when it was too costly for most Muslims to purchase a manuscript, copies of the Qurʼān were kept in mosques and made accessible to people; these copies frequently took the form of a series of thirty parts (juzʼ). Some use these divisions to facilitate recitation of the Qurʼān in a month—such as during the Islamic month of Ramadan, when the entire Qurʼān is recited in the Tarawih prayers, typically at the rate of one juzʼ a night.

== Subdivisions ==
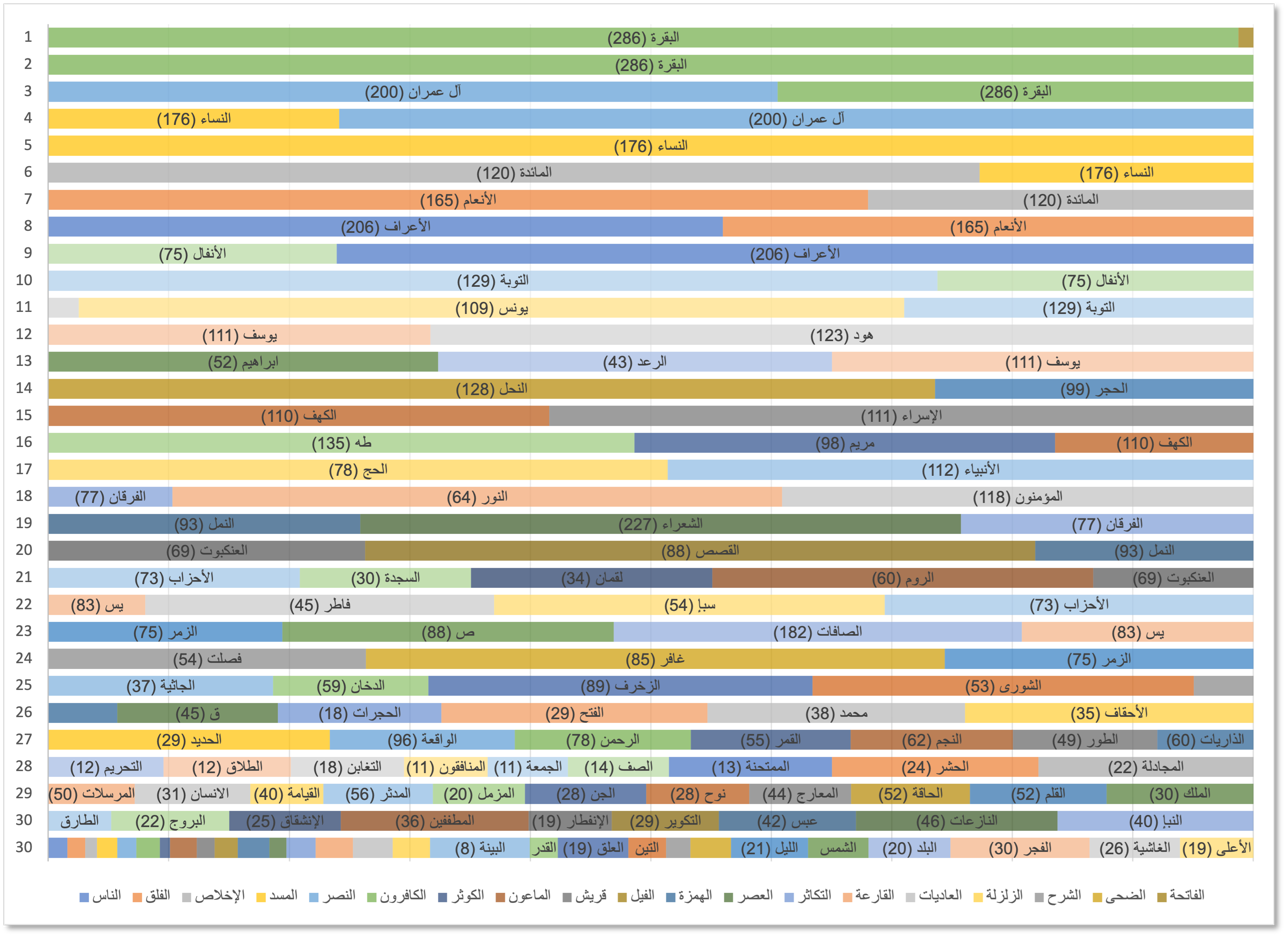
Distribution of Surahs by Juz', with the length of the bar corresponding to a Surah being proportionate to the number of letters of the Surahs in the Juz' divided by the total number of letters in the Juz'.

Most Juz' are named after the first word of the first verse of the Juz'. Each Juz' is divided into two Hizb (lit. "two groups", plural: Aḥzāb). Therefore, there are 60 Hizbs in the Quran.

Each Hizb is subdivided into four quarters called Maqraʼ (lit. "reading"), making eight quarters per Juz'. There are 240 Maqraʼs in the Quran. The Maqraʼ are often used as practical sections for review when memorizing the Quran.

The most commonly memorized Juz' is Juzʼ Amma, the 30th Juz', containing chapters (Surahs) 78 through 114, with most of the shortest chapters of the Quran.

== List ==
The associated names of each Juz’ in the Qurʼān:
Juz'				Hizb (1/2 part)	Surahs (from chapter - to chapter)
No.	Name (Āyah - verse begins with)			Hizb (1/2 part)	Surahs (from chapter - to chapter)
No.	Arabic	English	Meaning	Hizb (1/2 part)	Surahs (from chapter - to chapter)
1	(آلم (آ-ل-م	Alīf-Lām-Mīm	These letters are called Muqatta’at (disjoined or disconnected letters) or Known to God	1	Al-Fatiha (1:1) - Al-Baqarah (2:74)
1	(آلم (آ-ل-م	Alīf-Lām-Mīm	These letters are called Muqatta’at (disjoined or disconnected letters) or Known to God	2	Al-Baqarah (2:75) - Al-Baqarah (2:141)
2	سَيَقُولُ	Sayaqūlu	"Will (they) say"	3	Al-Baqarah (2:142) - Al-Baqarah (2:202)
2	سَيَقُولُ	Sayaqūlu	"Will (they) say"	4	Al-Baqarah (2:203) - Al-Baqarah (2:252)
3	تِلْكَ ٱلْرُّسُلُ	Tilka ’r-Rusulu	"These are the Messengers"	5	Al-Baqarah (2:253) - Āl ‘Imrān (3:14)
3	تِلْكَ ٱلْرُّسُلُ	Tilka ’r-Rusulu	"These are the Messengers"	6	Āl ‘Imrān (3:15) - Āl ‘Imrān (3:92)
4	كُلُّ ٱلطَّعَامِ	Kullu ’l-Ta‘aam	"All food"	7	Āl ‘Imrān (3:93) - Āl ‘Imrān (3:170)
4	كُلُّ ٱلطَّعَامِ	Kullu ’l-Ta‘aam	"All food"	8	Āl ‘Imrān (3:171) - An-Nisā’ (4:23)
5	وَٱلْمُحْصَنَاتُ	Wa’l-muḥṣanātu	"And prohibited are the ones who are married"	9	An-Nisā’ (4:24) - An-Nisā’ (4:87)
5	وَٱلْمُحْصَنَاتُ	Wa’l-muḥṣanātu	"And prohibited are the ones who are married"	10	An-Nisā’ (4:88) - An-Nisā’ (4:147)
6	لَا يُحِبُّ ٱللهُ	Lā yuḥibbu-’llāhu	"God does not like"	11	An-Nisā’ (4:148) - Al-Mā’idah (5:26)
6	لَا يُحِبُّ ٱللهُ	Lā yuḥibbu-’llāhu	"God does not like"	12	Al-Mā’idah (5:27) - Al-Mā’idah (5:81)
7	وَإِذَا سَمِعُوا	Wa ’Idha Samiʿū	"And when they hear"	13	Al-Mā’idah (5:82) - Al-An‘ām (6:35)
7	وَإِذَا سَمِعُوا	Wa ’Idha Samiʿū	"And when they hear"	14	Al-An‘ām (6:36) - Al-An‘ām (6:110)
8	وَلَوْ أَنَّنَا	Wa-law annanā	"And (even) if (that) we had"	15	Al-An‘ām (6:111) - Al-An‘ām (6:165)
8	وَلَوْ أَنَّنَا	Wa-law annanā	"And (even) if (that) we had"	16	Al-A‘rāf (7:1) - Al-A‘rāf (7:87)
9	قَالَ ٱلْمَلَأُ	Qāla ’l-mala’u	"Said the chiefs (eminent ones)"	17	Al-A‘rāf (7:88) - Al-A‘rāf (7:170)
9	قَالَ ٱلْمَلَأُ	Qāla ’l-mala’u	"Said the chiefs (eminent ones)"	18	Al-A‘rāf (7:171) - Al-Anfāl (8:40)
10	وَٱعْلَمُواْ	Wa-’aʿlamū	"And (you) know"	19	Al-Anfāl (8:41) - At-Tawbah (9:33)
10	وَٱعْلَمُواْ	Wa-’aʿlamū	"And (you) know"	20	At-Tawbah (9:34) - At-Tawbah (9:92)
11	يَعْتَذِرُونَ	Yaʿtaḏirūn	"Only the way (for blame)"	21	At-Tawbah (9:93) - Yũnus (10:25)
11	يَعْتَذِرُونَ	Yaʿtaḏirūn	"Only the way (for blame)"	22	Yũnus (10:26) - Hūd (11:5)
12	وَمَا مِنْ دَآبَّةٍ	Wa mā min dābbatin	"And there is no creature"	23	Hūd (11:6) - Hūd (11:83)
12	وَمَا مِنْ دَآبَّةٍ	Wa mā min dābbatin	"And there is no creature"	24	Hūd (11:84) - Yūsuf (12:52)
13	وَمَا أُبَرِّئُ	Wa mā ubarri’u	"And I do not acquit"	25	Yūsuf (12:53) - Ar-Ra‘d (13:18)
13	وَمَا أُبَرِّئُ	Wa mā ubarri’u	"And I do not acquit"	26	Ar-Ra‘d (13:19) - Al-Hijr (15:1)
14	رُبَمَا	Alīf-Lām-Rā’/ Rubamā	Perhaps those	27	Al-Hijr (15:2) - An-Naḥl (16:50)
14	رُبَمَا	Alīf-Lām-Rā’/ Rubamā	Perhaps those	28	An-Naḥl (16:51) - An-Naḥl (16:128)
15	سُبْحَانَ ٱلَّذِى	Subḥāna ’lladhī	"Exalted is the One (God) is who "	29	Al-Isrā’ (17:1) - Al-Isrā’ (17:98)
15	سُبْحَانَ ٱلَّذِى	Subḥāna ’lladhī	"Exalted is the One (God) is who "	30	Al-Isrā’ (17:99) - Al-Kahf (18:74)
16	قَالَ أَلَمْ	Qāla ’alam	"He (Al-Khidr) said: Did I not"	31	Al-Kahf (18:75) - Maryam (19:98)
16	قَالَ أَلَمْ	Qāla ’alam	"He (Al-Khidr) said: Did I not"	32	Ṭā Hā (20:1) - Ṭā Hā (20:135)
17	ٱقْتَرَبَ لِلْنَّاسِ	Iqtaraba li’n-nāsi	"Has (the time of) approached for Mankind (people)"	33	Al-Anbiyāʼ (21:1) - Al-Anbiyāʼ (21:112)
17	ٱقْتَرَبَ لِلْنَّاسِ	Iqtaraba li’n-nāsi	"Has (the time of) approached for Mankind (people)"	34	ِAl-Ḥajj (22:1) - Al-Ḥajj (22:78)
18	قَدْ أَفْلَحَ	Qad ’aflaḥa	"Indeed (Certainly) successful"	35	Al-Muʼminūn (23:1) - An-Nūr (24:20)
18	قَدْ أَفْلَحَ	Qad ’aflaḥa	"Indeed (Certainly) successful"	36	An-Nūr (24:21) - Al-Furqān (25:20)
19	وَقَالَ ٱلَّذِينَ	Wa-qāla ’lladhīna	"And said those who"	37	Al-Furqān (25:21) - Ash-Shu‘arā’ (26:110)
19	وَقَالَ ٱلَّذِينَ	Wa-qāla ’lladhīna	"And said those who"	38	Ash-Shu‘arā’ (26:111) - An-Naml (27:55)
20	أَمَّنْ خَلَقَ	’Amman ḵalaqa	"Is He Who created…"	39	An-Naml (27:56) - Al-Qaṣaṣ (28:50)
20	أَمَّنْ خَلَقَ	’Amman ḵalaqa	"Is He Who created…"	40	Al-Qaṣaṣ (28:51) - Al-‘Ankabūt (29:45)
21	أُتْلُ مَاأُوْحِیَ	Utlu mā ’ūhiya	"Recite, [O Muhammad], what has been revealed to you"	41	Al-‘Ankabūt (29:46) - Luqmān (31:21)
21	أُتْلُ مَاأُوْحِیَ	Utlu mā ’ūhiya	"Recite, [O Muhammad], what has been revealed to you"	42	Luqmān (31:22) - Al-Aḥzāb (33:30)
22	وَمَنْ يَّقْنُتْ	Wa-man yaqnut	"And whoever is obedient (devoutly obeys)"	43	Al-Aḥzāb (33:31) - Saba’ (34:23)
22	وَمَنْ يَّقْنُتْ	Wa-man yaqnut	"And whoever is obedient (devoutly obeys)"	44	Saba’ (34:24) - Yā Sīn (36:27)
23	وَمَآ لي	Wa-Mali	"And what happened to me"	45	Yā Sīn (36:28) - Aṣ-Ṣāffāt (37:144)
23	وَمَآ لي	Wa-Mali	"And what happened to me"	46	Aṣ-Ṣāffāt (37:145) - Az-Zumar (39:31)
24	فَمَنْ أَظْلَمُ	Fa-man ’aẓlamu	"So who is more unjust"	47	Az-Zumar (39:32) - Ghāfir (40:40)
24	فَمَنْ أَظْلَمُ	Fa-man ’aẓlamu	"So who is more unjust"	48	Ghāfir (40:41) - Fuṣṣilat (41:46)
25	إِلَيْهِ يُرَدُّ	Ilayhi yuraddu	"To Him (God) alone is attributed"	49	Fuṣṣilat (41:47) - Az-Zukhruf (43:23)
25	إِلَيْهِ يُرَدُّ	Ilayhi yuraddu	"To Him (God) alone is attributed"	50	Az-Zukhruf (43:24) - Al-Jāthiyah (45:37)
26	حم	Ḥā’ Mīm	"Known to God or Ha Meem"	51	Al-Aḥqāf (46:1) - Al-Fatḥ (48:17)
26	حم	Ḥā’ Mīm	"Known to God or Ha Meem"	52	Al-Fatḥ (48:18) - Adh-Dhāriyāt (51:30)
27	قَالَ فَمَا خَطْبُكُم	Qāla fa-mā khaṭbukum	He (Ibrahim A.S.) said: "Then what is your business (mission) here"	53	Adh-Dhāriyāt (51:31) - Al-Qamar (54:55)
27	قَالَ فَمَا خَطْبُكُم	Qāla fa-mā khaṭbukum	He (Ibrahim A.S.) said: "Then what is your business (mission) here"	54	Ar-Raḥmān (55:1) - Al-Ḥadīd (57:29)
28	قَدْ سَمِعَ ٱللهُ	Qad samiʿa ’llāhu	"Indeed has God heard"	55	Al-Mujādilah (58:1) - Aṣ-Ṣaff (61:14)
28	قَدْ سَمِعَ ٱللهُ	Qad samiʿa ’llāhu	"Indeed has God heard"	56	Al-Jumu`ah (62:1) - At-Taḥrīm (66:12)
29	تَبَارَكَ	Tabāraka	"Blessed is"	57	Al-Mulk (67:1) - Nūḥ (71:28)
29	تَبَارَكَ	Tabāraka	"Blessed is"	58	Al-Jinn (72:1) - Al-Mursalāt (77:50)
30	عَمَّ	‘Amma	"About what"	59	An-Nabaʼ (78:1) - Aṭ-Ṭāriq (86:17)
30	عَمَّ	‘Amma	"About what"	60	Al-Aʻlā (87:1) - An-Nās (114:6)

== Maqraʼ ==
The verse sections of each Rub el Hizb', an "1/8th" of a Juz', commonly used in reading the Qurʼān:
Ḥizb Number:	1st Quarter	2nd Quarter	3rd Quarter	4th Quarter	Total:
1	32 (1:1-2:25)	18 (2:26-2:43)	16 (2:44-2:59)	15 (2:60-2:74)	81
2	17 (2:75-2:91)	14 (2:92-2:105)	18 (2:106-2:123)	18 (2:124-2:141)	67
3	16 (2:142-2:157)	19 (2:158-2:176)	12 (2:177-2:188)	14 (2:189-2:202)	61
4	16 (2:203-2:218)	14 (2:219-2:232)	10 (2:233-2:242)	10 (2:243-2:252)	50
5	10 (2:253-2:262)	9 (2:263-2:271)	11 (2:272-2:282)	18 (2:283-3:14)	48
6	18 (3:15-3:32)	19 (3:33-3:51)	23 (3:52-3:74)	18 (3:75-3:92)	78
7	20 (3:93-3:112)	20 (3:113-3:132)	20 (3:133-3:152)	18 (3:153-3:170)	78
8	15 (3:171-3:185)	15 (3:186-3:200)	11 (4:1-4:11)	12 (4:12-4:23)	53
9	12 (4:24-4:35)	22 (4:36-4:57)	16 (4:58-4:73)	14 (4:74-4:87)	64
10	12 (4:88-4:99)	14 (4:100-4:113)	21 (4:114-4:134)	13 (4:135-4:147)	60
11	15 (4:148-4:162)	14 (4:163-4:176)	11 (5:1-5:11)	15 (5:12-5:26)	55
12	14 (5:27-5:40)	10 (5:41-5:50)	16 (5:51-5:66)	15 (5:67-5:81)	55
13	15 (5:82-5:96)	12 (5:97-5:108)	24 (5:109-6:12)	23 (6:13-6:35)	74
14	23 (6:36-6:58)	15 (6:59-6:73)	21 (6:74-6:94)	16 (6:95-6:110)	75
15	16 (6:111-6:126)	14 (6:127-6:140)	10 (6:141-6:150)	15 (6:151-6:165)	55
16	30 (7:1-7:30)	16 (7:31-7:46)	18 (7:47-7:64)	23 (7:65-7:87)	87
17	29 (7:88-7:116)	25 (7:117-7:141)	14 (7:142-7:155)	15 (7:156-7:170)	83
18	18 (7:171-7:188)	18 (7:189-7:206)	21 (8:1-8:21)	19 (8:22-8:40)	76
19	20 (8:41-8:60)	15 (8:61-8:75)	18 (9:1-9:18)	15 (9:19-9:33)	68
20	12 (9:34-9:45)	14 (9:46-9:59)	15 (9:60-9:74)	18 (9:75-9:92)	59
21	18 (9:93-9:110)	11 (9:111-9:121)	18 (9:122-10:10)	15 (10:11-10:25)	62
22	27 (10:26-10:52)	18 (10:53-10:70)	19 (10:71-10:89)	25 (10:90-11:5)	89
23	18 (11:6-11:23)	17 (11:24-11:40)	20 (11:41-11:60)	23 (11:61-11:83)	78
24	24 (11:84-11:107)	22 (11:108-12:6)	23 (12:7-12:29)	23 (12:30-12:52)	92
25	24 (12:53-12:76)	24 (12:77-12:100)	15 (12:101-13:4)	14 (13:5-13:18)	77
26	16 (13:19-13:34)	18 (13:35-14:9)	18 (14:10-14:27)	25 (14:28-14:52)	77
27	48 (15:1-15:48)	51 (15:49-15:99)	29 (16:1-16:29)	21 (16:30-16:50)	149
28	24 (16:51-16:74)	15 (16:75-16:89)	21 (16:90-16:110)	18 (16:111-16:128)	78
29	22 (17:1-17:22)	27 (17:23-17:49)	20 (17:50-17:69)	29 (17:70-17:98)	98
30	29 (17:99-18:16)	15 (18:17-18:31)	19 (18:32-18:50)	24 (18:51-18:74)	87
31	24 (18:75-18:98)	33 (18:99-19:21)	37 (19:22-19:58)	40 (19:59-19:98)	134
32	54 (20:1-20:54)	28 (20:55-20:82)	28 (20:83-20:110)	25 (20:111-20:135)	135
33	28 (21:1-21:28)	22 (21:29-21:50)	32 (21:51-21:82)	30 (21:83-21:112)	112
34	18 (22:1-22:18)	19 (22:19-22:37)	22 (22:38-22:59)	19 (22:60-22:78)	78
35	35 (23:1-23:35)	39 (23:36-23:74)	44 (23:75-23:118)	20 (24:1-24:20)	138
36	14 (24:21-24:34)	18 (24:35-24:52)	12 (24:53-24:64)	20 (25:1-25:20)	64
37	32 (25:21-25:52)	25 (25:53-25:77)	51 (26:1-26:51)	59 (26:52-26:110)	167
38	70 (26:111-26:180)	47 (26:181-26:227)	26 (27:1-27:26)	29 (27:27-27:55)	172
39	26 (27:56-27:81)	23 (27:82-28:11)	17 (28:12-28:28)	22 (28:29-28:50)	88
40	25 (28:51-28:75)	13 (28:76-28:88)	25 (29:1-29:25)	20 (29:26-29:45)	83
41	24 (29:46-29:69)	30 (30:1-30:30)	23 (30:31-30:53)	28 (30:54-31:21)	105
42	23 (31:22-32:10)	20 (32:11-32:30)	17 (33:1-33:17)	13 (33:18-33:30)	73
43	20 (33:31-33:50)	9 (33:51-33:59)	23 (33:60-34:9)	14 (34:10-34:23)	66
44	22 (34:24-34:45)	23 (34:46-35:14)	26 (35:15-35:40)	32 (35:41-36:27)	103
45	32 (36:28-36:59)	45 (36:60-37:21)	61 (37:22-37:82)	62 (37:83-37:144)	200
46	58 (37:145-38:20)	31 (38:21-38:51)	44 (38:52-39:7)	24 (39:8-39:31)	157
47	21 (39:32-39:52)	23 (39:53-39:75)	20 (40:1-40:20)	20 (40:21-40:40)	84
48	25 (40:41-40:65)	28 (40:66-41:8)	16 (41:9-41:24)	22 (41:25-41:46)	91
49	20 (41:47-42:12)	14 (42:13-42:26)	24 (42:27-42:50)	26 (42:51-43:23)	84
50	33 (43:24-43:56)	49 (43:57-44:16)	54 (44:17-45:11)	26 (45:12-45:37)	162
51	20 (46:1-46:20)	24 (46:21-47:9)	23 (47:10-47:32)	23 (47:33-48:17)	90
52	12 (48:18-48:29)	13 (49:1-49:13)	31 (49:14-50:26)	49 (50:27-51:30)	105
53	53 (51:31-52:23)	51 (52:24-53:25)	45 (53:26-54:8)	47 (54:9-54:55)	196
54	78 (55:1-55:78)	74 (56:1-56:74)	37 (56:75-57:15)	14 (57:16-57:29)	203
55	13 (58:1-58:13)	19 (58:14-59:10)	20 (59:11-60:6)	21 (60:7-61:14)	73
56	14 (62:1-63:3)	26 (63:4-64:18)	12 (65:1-65:12)	12 (66:1-66:12)	64
57	30 (67:1-67:30)	52 (68:1-68:52)	70 (69:1-70:18)	54 (70:19-71:28)	206
58	47 (72:1-73:19)	57 (73:20-74:56)	58 (75:1-76:18)	63 (76:19-77:50)	225
59	86 (78:1-79:46)	71 (80:1-81:29)	55 (82:1-83:36)	64 (84:1-86:17)	276
60	75 (87:1-89:30)	67 (90:1-93:11)	64 (94:1-100:8)	82 (100:9-114:6)	288
Totals:	1,642	1,528	1,548	1,518	6,236

== See also ==
- Manzil
- Rub el Hizb
