= Al Hejr =

15th chapter of the Qur'an

Surah 15 of the Quran
الحِجْرْ Al-Ḥijr The Stoneland
- Qira'ah; English text
- Classification: Meccan
- Other names: Al-Hijr Valley
- Position: Juzʼ 13-14
- Hizb no.: 27
- No. of verses: 99
- No. of Rukus: 6
- No. of words: 657
- No. of letters: 2882

Mada'in Salih مَدَائِن صَالِح
- Al-Hijr ٱلْحِجْر; Hegra
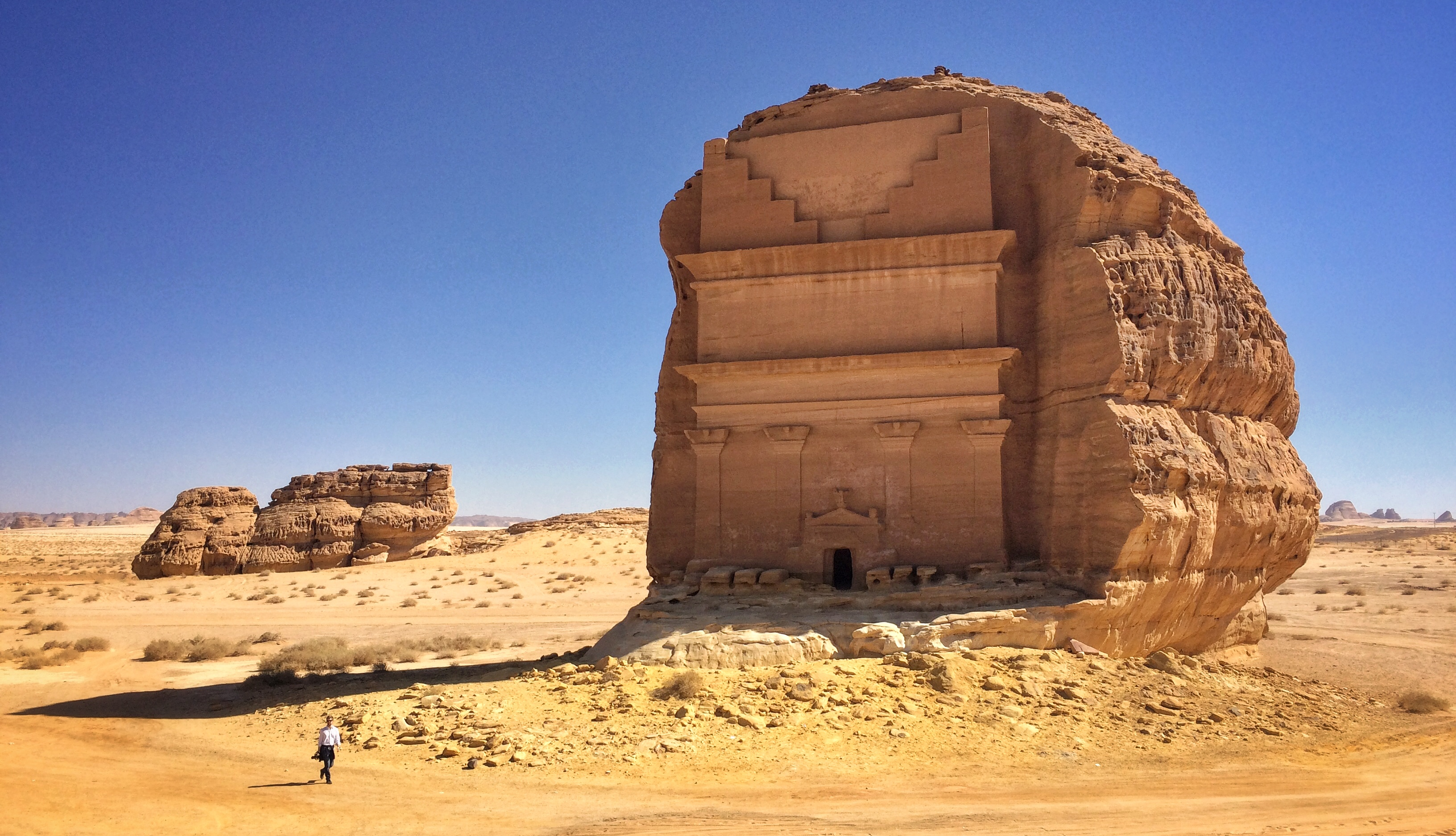
- Hegra (Mada'in Salih)

- Location within Saudi Arabia
- 26°47′30″N 37°57′10″E
- Type: Settlement
- Location: Al Madinah Region, Hejaz, Saudi Arabia

UNESCO World Heritage Site
- Official name: Al-Hijr Archaeological Site (Madâ’in Sâlih)
- Type: Cultural
- Criteria: ii, iii
- Designated: 2008 (32nd session)
- Reference no.: 1293
- Region: Arab States

Al-Ḥijr (Arabic: الحِجْرْ, lit. 'The Stoneland') is the 15th sūrah (chapter of the Quran). It has 99 verses (āyāt).

The asbāb al-nuzūl (timing and contextual background) is that it was revealed in Mecca revealed during the middle period and received by Muhammad shortly after sura Yusuf. Like other surahs of this period, it praises God. Parts of the verses 4-74 are preserved in the Ṣan‘ā’1 lower text.

This surah takes its name from its 80th āya, which refers to a pre-Islamic archaeological site called Hegra (Arabic: الحِجر, romanized: al-ḥijr, lit. 'the Stone').

== Summary ==
1-3 Unbelievers will one day wish themselves Muslims
4-5 Every nation has its day of grace
6 Muhammad charged with demoniacal possession by the disbelievers (the Quraysh)
7 The unbelievers say a true prophet would have come with a company of angels
8 Angels are not sent to gratify curiosity, but to minister judgment
9 God the revealer and preserver of the Quran
10-11 The former prophets were laughed to scorn
12-15 The scoffing Quraysh judicially blinded
16-20 God declares his glory in the heaven and the earth
21-22 He is active in every part of Nature
23-25 He is the God of life, death, and judgment
26-29 God says men created of clay—the Jinn of fire
29-33 Iblis, unlike the angels, refuses to prostrate to Adam
34-38 He is cursed and respited until the judgment
39-40 Satan declares to God his purpose to seduce men
41-42 The elect are safe from Satan’s power
43-44 The seven gates of hell will receive Satan’s followers
45-50 Paradise joys in store for true believers
51-77 The story of Abraham and Lot's conflict
78-79 The unbelieving Midianites are destroyed
80-81 The scoffing inhabitants of al Hijr reject their prophets though accompanied with miracles
82-84 Rock-hewn houses fail to save them
85-86 The heaven and earth created in righteousness
87 Command to repeat the seven verses (al-Fatiha)
88-90 Muhammad not to consider the prosperity of infidels
91-93 The enemies of God will surely be punished
94-96 Muhammad commanded to preach boldly
97-99 He is exhorted to praise and serve God until death

== Central theme ==
This surah contains brief mentions of Tawhid, and provides an admonition to the disbelievers. The primary subjects of the surah are:

1. cautioning the individuals who dismissed the message and
2. providing solace and support to Muhammad,

The Quran never limits itself to mere rebuke; reproach and reprimand. It depends on its statute. The surah contains brief contentions for Tawhid and admonition in the tale of Adam and Satan.

== Exegesis ==
=== 15:9 Preservation of the Quran ===
15:9 We have, without doubt, sent down the Message; and We (Note: The first-person plural pronoun we as traditionally used by a sovereign (believed by Muslims to be God in this case) in formal speech to refer to themselves in their role as the monarch.) will assuredly guard it (from corruption). Translation Yusuf Ali (Orig. 1938)

Ibn Kathir says, "God, may He be exalted, stated that He is the One Who revealed the Dhikr to him, which is the Qur'an, and He is protecting it from being changed or altered".
