= Saba (surah) =

34th chapter of the Qur'an

Surah 34 of the Quran
سَبَأ Saba’
- Qira'ah; English text
- Classification: Meccan
- Position: Juzʼ 22
- No. of verses: 54
- No. of Rukus: 6
- No. of words: 995
- No. of letters: 3542

Saba’ (Arabic: سبأ, saba’) is the 34th chapter (sūrah) of the Qur'an with 54 verses (āyāt). It discusses the lives of Solomon and David, a story about the people of Sheba, challenges and warnings against the disbelievers as well as the promises related to the Day of Judgment.

Regarding the timing and contextual background of the surah-Al-saba (circumstances of revelation), it is an earlier Meccan surah, which means it was revealed in Mecca instead of later in Medina.

== Summary ==
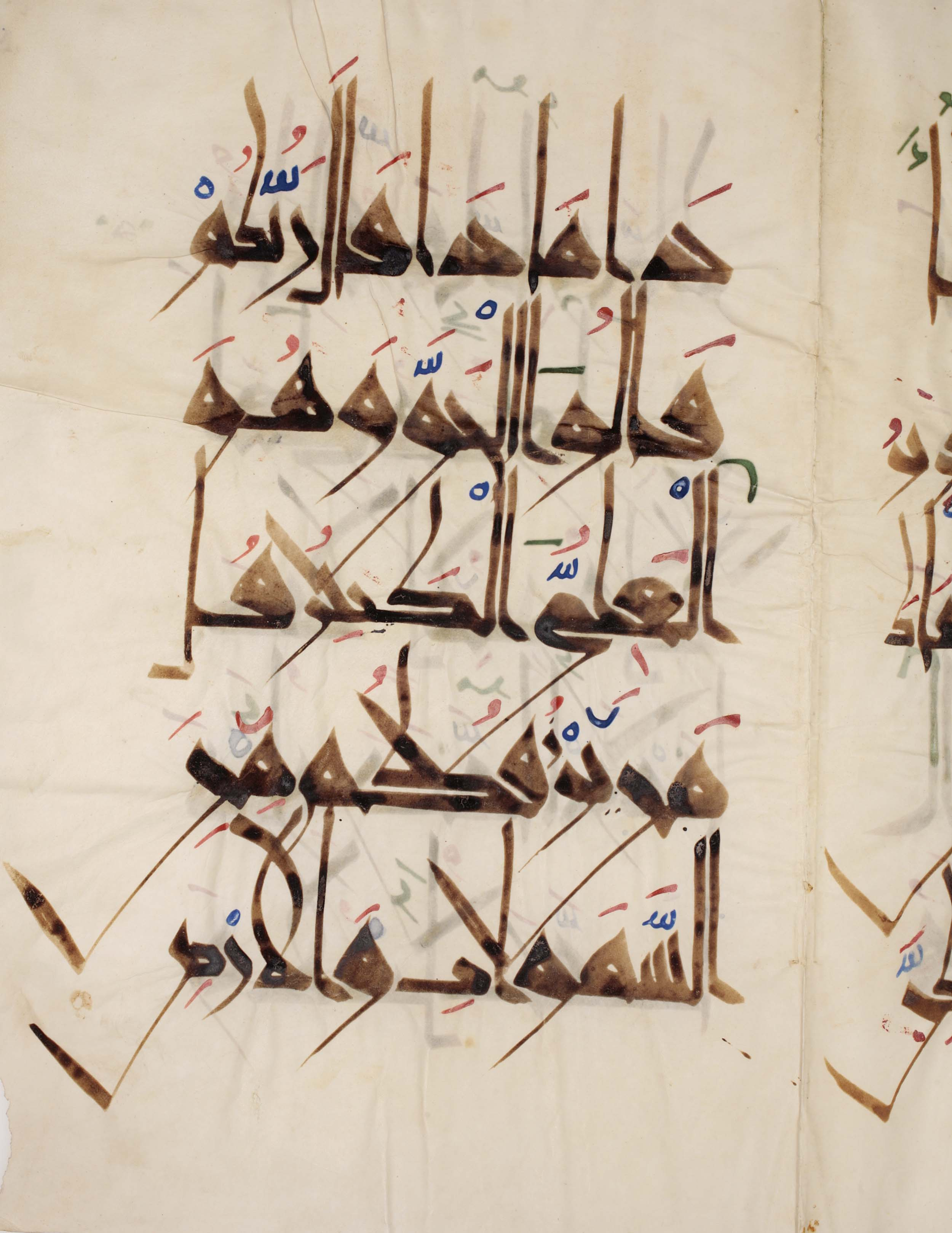
Folio from Saba' in an 11th century North African manuscript, Khalili Collection of Islamic Art

The chapter begins with the phrase Alhamdulillah ("Praise be to God"), one of five chapters to do so; the others are Al Fātiḥah, Al-An'am, Al-Kahf and Fatir. The first two verses assert God's praiseworthiness and omnipotence. The following verses (3–9) criticized the disbelievers for their rejection of the resurrection, the Day of Judgement and of Muhammad's message. The ninth verse also mentions the orderliness of the universe as evidence of God's omnipotence. The following verses (10–14) briefly discuss David and Solomon, both of whom are among the prophets in Islam.

Verses 15–19 contain a story about the eponymous people of Sheba. The story is based on the ancient Sabaeans who lived in the central lowlands of Yemen. According to the verses, they were originally prosperous, but turned away from worship and giving thanks to God, and as a result suffered a flood. The story is presented as a warning against worldly pride and arrogance. Semitic philologist A. F. L. Beeston linked the story to the prosperous Sabeans of the Ma'rib oasis who settled on each side of the wadi (hence the reference to "the garden of the right" and "of the left" in verse 15. Beeston, CNRS researcher Jérémie Schiettecatte, as well as the Quranic commentary The Study Quran argued that the flood corresponds to the failure of the dam system that irrigated the community. The dams were mentioned in inscriptions dated from around 450–540 CE, and The Study Quran further argues that the phrase "the flood of 'Arim" correspond to the triliteral root ʿ-r-m that appeared in the inscriptions to refer to the dam system.

The rest of the chapter discusses various topics, including the nature of Iblis (the Devil in the Islamic tradition), challenges to those who reject the message of Islam, warnings of the consequences which will come to them in the Day of Judgement, as well as the nature of Muhammad's mission.

== Ayat (verses) ==
- 1-2 Praise to the All-wise and Sovereign God
- 3 Unbelievers shall not escape the Judgement Day
- 4-5 The reward of believers and the punishment of infidels sure
- 6 Certain Jews accept the Quran as the word of God
- 7 The Quraish scoff at the doctrine of the resurrection
- 8 Muhammad accused of being a forger of the Quran and a madman
- 8-9 Divine judgments threatened against the unbelievers
- 10-11 David received blessing and knowledge from God
- 12 Solomon received dominion over the winds and the genii
- 13 The palaces, statues of Solomon etc constructed by genii
- 14 Solomon’s death concealed from the genii
- 15-16 The people of Sabá rebel against God and are punished
- 19 They are dispersed on account of covetousness
- 20 All but a few believers follow Iblís
- 21 The idolaters worship imaginary deities
- 22 Only those who are permitted shall intercede on the Judgment Day
- 23-26 The bountiful God will judge between true believers and the infidels
- 27 Muhammad sent to man as a warning
- 28-29 The infidels will feel God’s threatened punishment in the Judgment Day
- 30-32 Mutual enmity of the idolaters and their leaders on the day of judgment
- 33 God’s prophets have always been opposed by the affluent
- 34-35 The Makkans boast in their riches in vain
- 36 The righteous only shall be saved
- 37 Muhammad’s adversaries shall be punished
- 38 The Lord will reward the almsgivers
- 39-40 The angels shall repudiate their worshippers
- 41 Idolaters shall be unable to help one another in the judgment
- 42 The unbelievers call Muhammad a forger of the Quran and blasphemer
- 43-44 Rejecting their Prophet as did those before them, the Makkans shall receive like punishment
- 45-49 Muhammad protests the truth of his claims
- 50-54 Unbelievers shall repent when too late to avail

== Revelation history ==
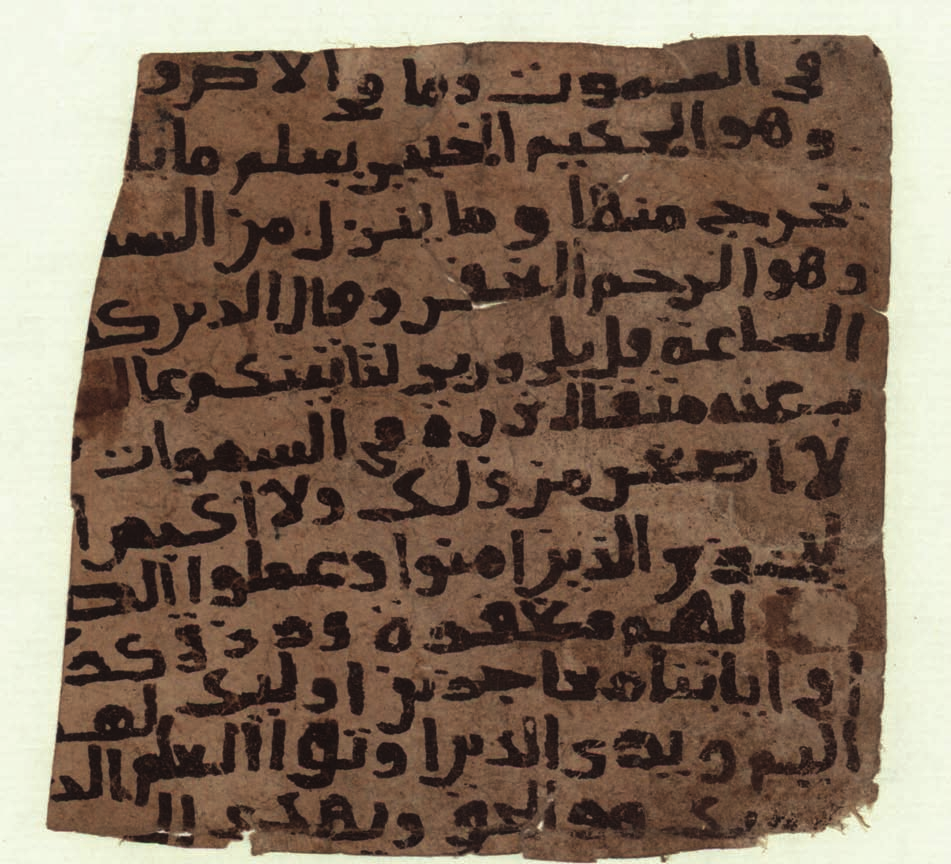
Medieval Blockprint of the first 6 ayahs of Surah Saba

The chapter was revealed during the Meccan period of Muhammad's prophethood, therefore, a Meccan sura. Some commentators of the Quran, including Ahmad ibn Ajiba, Mahmud al-Alusi, Ibn al-Jawzi, and Al-Qurtubi opined that the sixth verse was an exception and was revealed in the Medinan period.

== Name ==
The name of the chapter refers to Sheba, a kingdom mentioned in the Quran and the Bible. Sheba is the subject of verses 15 to 21 of the chapter, although this passage likely does not refer to the kingdom under the famous Queen of Sheba, but rather about a group of people in the same region in a later period. Orientalist A. F. L. Beeston and Jérémie Schiettecatte identified the people in these verses to be the Sabaeans who lived in the Ma'rib valley.
