= Al-Aḥzāb =

33rd chapter of the Qur'an

Surah 33 of the Quran
الأحزاب Al-Aḥzāb The Confedrates
- Qira'ah; English text
- Classification: Medinan
- Position: Juzʼ 21 to 22
- Hizb no.: 43
- No. of verses: 73
- No. of Rukus: 9
- No. of Sajdahs: (none)
- No. of words: 1303
- No. of letters: 5788

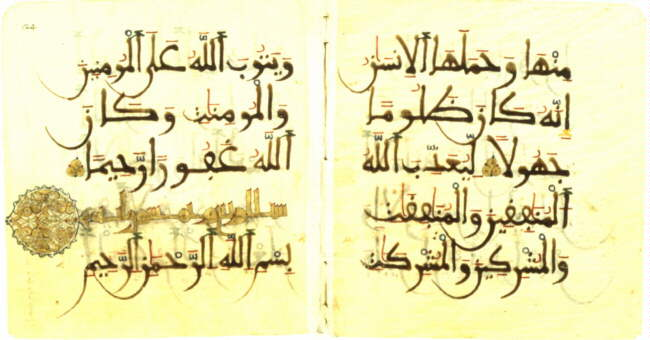
Section from verses 73 of Sura al-Ahzab

Al-Ahzab (Arabic: الأحزاب, al-aḥzāb; meaning: the confederates, or "the clans", "the coalition", or "the combined forces") is the 33rd chapter (sūrah) of the Quran (Q33) with 73 verses (āyāt). The sūrah takes its name from the mention of the parties (al-aḥzāb), or confederates (an alliance among the Quraysh and other tribes), who fought the Muslims at the Battle of the Trench (5/627), also known as the Battle of the Parties and as the siege of Madinah.

== Summary ==
- 1-3 Muhammad to obey God rather than the unbelievers
- 4-5 Adopted sons not to be regarded as real sons by Muslims
- 6 Muhammad's wives the mothers of the faithful
- 7-8 The covenant of the prophets with God
- 9-11 God’s favour to the Muslims at the Ditch
- 12-15 The disaffected people of Madína rebuked
- 16-17 None can flee from God’s anger
- 18-20 The treachery of the hypocrites of Madína exposed
- 21 Muhammad an example to the faithful
- 22-24 Patient endurance of the believers at the Ditch
- 25 The triumph at the Ditch attributed to God’s favor
- 26-27 Reference to the slaughter of the Bani Qainuqáa
- 28-29 Muhammad’s wives rebuked
- 30-31 Muhammad’s wives, if incontinent, to be doubly punished, but if faithful, to be doubly rewarded
- 32 33 34 They are exhorted to modest behaviour and piety
- 35 Blessings promised to faithful men and women
- 36-40 Revelations touching the Zainab divorce story
- 41-43 The blessedness of true believers
- 44-47 Muhammad a witness and preacher of good tidings
- 48 The law of divorce modified
- 49-51 Special privileges of Muhammad with respect to women
- 52 Muhammad limited in respect to wives
- 53-55 Conduct to be observed by believers at the Prophet’s house
- 56 God and the angels bless Muhammad, who should be treated with respect by believers
- 57-58 The curse of those who offend Muhammad or the Muslims
- 59 Command respecting the veiling of Muslim women
- 60-62 Threatened punishment of Madína hypocrites
- 63 Men know not the hour of judgment
- 64-68 Awful fate of infidels
- 69-71 Believers exhorted to respectful treatment of their Prophet
- 72-73 The responsibilities of the faithful

== Exegesis ==
This surah mentions what happened at the Battle of the Trench to remind believers of the mercy and power of Allah since Allah made the various tribes who attacked Medina leave.

Regarding the timing and contextual background of the believed revelation (asbāb al-nuzūl), Q33 is a later period "Medinan surah". It contains instructions regarding the treatment of the Prophet and his wives and warns the hypocrites of their bad behavior. According to some scholars, Medinan verses are concerned with the legal matters in Islamic society. These suras generally contain rules and regulations for the believers to follow.

=== 5-6 Adopted and blood-related persons ===
Verses 33:5-6 are concerned with the differences between adopted and blood-related persons. Verse 33:5 refers to adoption in Islam and verse 33:6 contains a reference to the term "Mother of Believers", who was the Prophet's wife. This perhaps suggests their elevated standing with the community and in the later verses, these women are described as "unlike any other."

=== 7-8 Sincerity of the prophets ===
Verses 33:7-8 show that God will test even the sincerity of the prophets. The beginning of the sura seems to be concerned with truthfulness. The sura reinforces that "God is enough to trust...All this is written in the Scripture...God will question [even] the truthful about their sincerity, and for those who reject the truth He has prepared a painful torment...speak in a direct fashion." Truthfulness and trust seem to be emphasized for believers and Muhammad since he was dealing with hypocrites and betrayers in Medina, who spread lies, deserted the army during the battle, or supported the attackers.

=== 9-20 Battle of the Trench – aftermath ===
Verses 33:9-27 are concerned with the believers' and hypocrites' reactions to the Battle of the Trench. The believers are those who remain steadfast in their belief and courage whereas the hypocrites try to run for safety, abandon the Muslim army, and doubt God and Prophet Muhammad.

=== 21 Prophet of Allah is an excellent model ===
Verily you have in the Prophet of Allah an excellent model, for him who fears Allah and the Last Day and who remembers Allah much "Surely, in the Messenger of God, there is for you a fairer, good example for those whose hope had been in God and the Last Day and remembered God frequently."^{[Quran 33:21 (Translated by Laleh Bakhtiar)]}

Quran 33:21 shows that it is an important principle to follow the Messenger of God in all his words and deeds.

=== 26 Siege of Banu Qurayza ===
Quran 33:26 contains a reference to the siege of the Banu Qurayza and consequent looting of their possessions.

=== 28–32 Wives of Muhammad ===
Quran 33:28-34 contain a reference to Muhammad's wives and tell the believers the proper conduct with Muhammad and his household. The prophet's wives are called the Mothers of the Believers and thus have to follow certain rules and regulations as women who are "unlike other women".

=== 35-36 Forgiveness and reward ===
Quran 33:35-36 show the characteristics of people who will be forgiven and rewarded by God. Some scholars take these verses to mean equal worth of women and men and thus reject claims that women are inferior to men.

=== 37-47 God to be trusted, obeyed, and glorified ===
Quran 33:37-47 reaffirm that God needs to be trusted, obeyed, and glorified. Quran 33:40 contains a reference to Finality of Prophethood.

=== 49-52 Who the prophet can marry ===
Quran 33:49-52 detail who the prophet can marry or not. Verse 50 was revealed pertaining to Maymunah bint al-Harith.

=== 53-58 House rules ===
Quran 33:53-58 tell the believers how they should interact with Muhammad when visiting him and his household.

=== 59 Islam and gender segregation ===
Quran 33:59 uses the phrase adna al-jilbab which is sometimes understood as 'wrap around' and is used to acknowledge women to cover themselves, as an act of modesty.

=== 60-73 Punishment for hypocrites and idolaters ===
Quran 33:60-73 explains the actions that God will take with the disbelievers and believers and will direct Muhammad to take against the hypocrites. The penultimate verse explains that mankind chose to be given free will.The last verse ends with the proclamation that God will punish both hypocrites and idolaters, whether they are men and women, and reward the believers of both genders. Both genders are presented as equal since they are both punished or redeemed without any differences when judged by God.

== See also ==
- Verse of purification
