= Al-Fatiha =

First chapter of the Qur'an

Surah 1 of the Quran
ٱلۡفَاتِحَةِ Al-Fātiḥah The Opening
- Qira'ah; English text
- Classification: Meccan
- Position: Juzʼ 1, Hizb 1
- No. of verses: 7
- No. of words: 25 or 29 (Note: when counting the basmala)
- No. of letters: 113 or 139

Al-Fatiḥa
Recitation of Al-Fatiḥa in mujawwad.

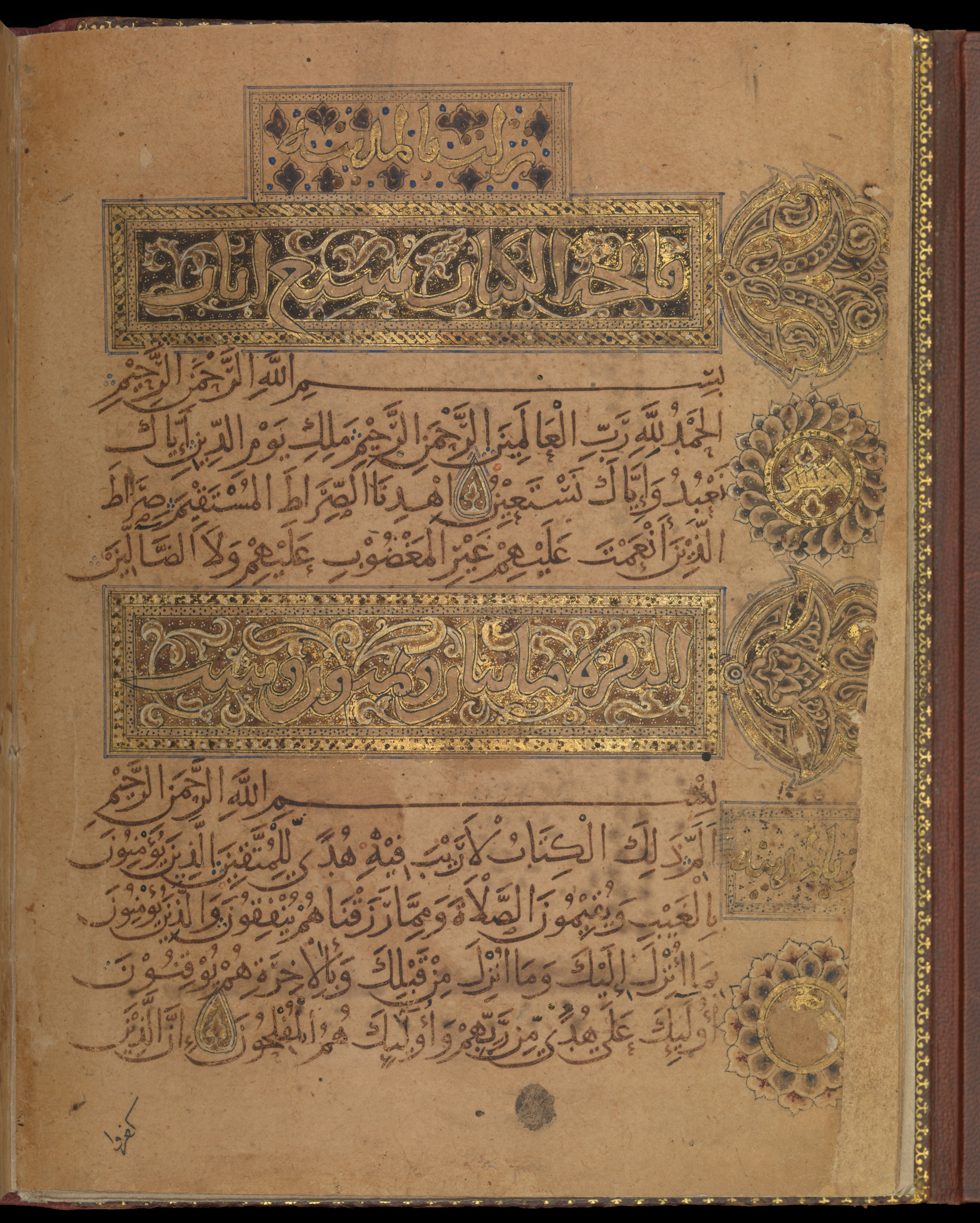
Headings for Al-Fatiḥa, and for Chapter 2, Al-Baqara. From the Quran of Ibn al-Bawwab. Baghdad, 1000/1001. Chester Beatty Library

Al-Fātiḥah (Arabic: ٱلۡفَاتِحَةِ, romanized: Al-Fātiḥah, lit. 'The Opening') is the first chapter (Surah) of the Quran. It consists of seven verses (Ayat) which consist of a prayer for guidance and mercy.

Al-Fatihah is recited in Muslim obligatory and voluntary prayers, known as Salah. The primary literal meaning of the expression "Al-Fatiḥah" is "The Opener/The Key".

== Background ==
The most commonly accepted view about the origins of the Surah is the view of Ibn Abbas, among others, that Al-Fatihah is a Meccan surah, although some believe that it is either a Medinan surah or was revealed in both Mecca and Medina. Most narrators recorded that Al-Fatihah was the first complete Surah revealed to Muhammad.

The name Al-Fatihah ("The Opener") could refer to the surah being the first in the Mus'hafs, the first to be recited in each Rak'at of Salah, or to the manner of its usage in many Islamic traditions as an opening prayer. The word itself comes from the root f-t-ḥ (ف ت ح), which means "to open, explain, disclose, conquer", etc. Al-Fatihahh is also known by several other names, such as Al-Hamd (The Praise), As-Salah (The Prayer), Umm al-Kitab (Mother of the Book), Umm al-Quran (Mother of the Quran), Sab'a min al-Mathani (Seven Repeated Ones, from Quran 15:87), and Ash-Shifa' (The Cure).

== Summary ==
Surah Al-Fatihah is narrated in the Hadith to have been divided into two halves between God and his servant (the person reciting), the first three verses being God's half and last three being the servant's. There is disagreement as to whether the Bismillah is the first verse of the Surah, or even a verse in the first place.

The chapter begins by praising God with the phrase and stating that it is God who is the lord of the worlds (verse 1/2), that He is the most gracious and most merciful (verse 2/3), and that He is and will be the true owner of everything and everyone on the Day of Judgement (verse 3/4).

"If you tried to count Allah's blessings, you would never be able to number them. Indeed, humankind is truly unfair, ˹totally˺ ungrateful" (Quran 14:34).

The final three verses, which comprise the servant's half, begin with the servant stating that they worship and seek only God's help (verse 4/5), asking him to guide them to the Sirat al-Mustaqim (the Straight Path) of those who God has been bountiful to, and not of those who have earned his anger (verses 5-7/6-7).

Some Muslim commentators have interpreted these verses in a more general sense, not referring exclusively to any specific group of people. However, some Muslim commentators believe Jews and Christians are examples of those evoking God's anger and those who went astray, respectively.

== Verses and meaning ==
بِسْمِ ٱللَّهِ ٱلرَّحْمَـٰنِ ٱلرَّحِيمِ ۝١

[bi-smi l-Lāhi r-raḥmāni r-raḥīm(i)]
^{1} In the name of God, the Most Compassionate, Most Merciful.

ٱلْحَمْدُ لِلَّهِ رَبِّ ٱلْعَـٰلَمِينَ ۝٢

[al-ḥamdu li-l-Lāhi rabbi l-ʿālamīn(a)]
^{2} All praise is for God — Lord of all universes,

ٱلرَّحْمَـٰنِ ٱلرَّحِيمِ ۝٣

[ar-raḥmāni r-raḥīm(i)]
^{3} the Most Compassionate, Most Merciful,

مَـٰلِكِ (Note: Qira’at: All except for ʻAsem, Al-Kesa’i, Yaʻqub and Khalaf in one of his narrations read it as: مَلِكِ يَوْمِ ٱلدِّينِ ۝٤ maliki yawmi d-dīn(i)^{4} King of the Day of Judgement.) يَوْمِ ٱلدِّينِ ۝٤

[māliki yawmi d-dīn(i)]
^{4} Master of the Day of Judgment.

إِيَّاكَ نَعْبُدُ وَإِيَّاكَ نَسْتَعِينُ ۝٥

[iyyāka naʿbudu wa-iyyāka nastaʿīn(u)]
^{5} Thee [alone] we worship and Thee [alone] we ask for help.

ٱهْدِنَا ٱلصِّرَٰطَ ٱلْمُسْتَقِيمَ ۝٦

[ihdinā ṣ-ṣirāṭa l-mustaqīm(a)]
^{6} Guide us along the Straight Path,

صِرَٰطَ ٱلَّذِينَ أَنْعَمْتَ عَلَيْهِمْ غَيْرِ ٱلْمَغْضُوبِ عَلَيْهِمْ وَلَا ٱلضَّآلِّينَ ۝٧

[ṣirāṭa l-laḏīna anʿamta ʿalayhim ḡayri l-maḡḍūbi ʿalayhim wa-lā ḍ-ḍāllīn(a)]
^{7} the Path of those You have blessed—not of those who have evoked [Your] anger or of those who are astray.

== Benefits and virtues ==
Muslims attribute special significance to some surahs for their virtues and benefits (فضائل, faḍā’il) described in the hadith. Acceptance of the different hadith varies between Sunni and Shia Muslims, and there is a variety of terms to classify the different levels of confirmed authenticity of a hadith. However, both Sunnis and Shia believe Al-Fatihah to be one of the greatest surahs in the Quran, and a cure for several diseases and poisons, both spiritual and mental.

According to the Prophet:

While I was with Jibreel, I suddenly heard a noise from above. Jibreel lifted his sight to the sky and said, 'This is a door in the heavens being opened, and it has never been opened before now.' An angel descended and said, 'Receive the good news of two lights that have been given to you, which no prophet before you was given: the Opening of the Book (Al-Fatiha) and the last verses of Al-Baqarah. You will never recite a word from them except that you will be given (reward).'

— Sahih Muslim, Hadith 806

It has been narrated from Imam Ja'far al-Sadiq that if Surah Hamd is recited seventy times over the body of a dead person and the soul returns to its body, it is not surprising. Imam Baqir also stated: "Whoever is not cured by Surah al-Hamd, nothing else will cure him."

== See also ==
- Lord's Prayer

== Bibliography ==
- David James (1988). Qur'ans of the Mamluks. London: Alexandria Press. ISBN 9780500973677.
