= An-Naml =

27th chapter of the Qur'an

Surah 27 of the Quran
الْنَّمْل Al-Naml The Ants
- Qira'ah; English text
- Classification: Meccan
- Position: Juzʼ 19 to 20
- Hizb no.: 39
- No. of verses: 93
- No. of Rukus: 7
- No. of Sajdahs: 1 (verse 26)
- No. of words: 1276
- No. of letters: 4724

An-Naml (Arabic: النمل, romanized: an-naml, lit. 'The Ant') is the 27th chapter (sūrah) of the Qur'an with 93 verses (āyāt).

Regarding the timing and contextual background of the revelation (asbāb al-nuzūl), it is traditionally believed to be a Meccan surah, from the second Meccan period (615-619 CE).

== Summary ==
- 1-3 The Quran is a direction of good tidings to the faithful
- 4-5 Unbelievers are losers here and hereafter
- 6 The Quran certainly given by God to Muhammad
- 7-12 The story of Moses at the burning bush
- 13-14 Moses rejected by Pharaoh and the Egyptians as an impostor
- 15 David and Solomon praise God for their wisdom
- 16-17 Solomon's dominion over Jinn, men, and birds
- 18-19 The wise ant pleases Solomon
- ۩ 20-44 The story of the Queen of Sheba and her conversion to Islam
- 45-48 Thamūd rejects Sāliḥ, their prophet
- 49-51 Nine men plot the destruction of Sāliḥ and his family
- 52-54 The Thamūdites and their plotters are destroyed, but Sāliḥ and his followers are saved
- 55-59 The story of Lot and the destruction of Sodom
- 60-68 God, the creator and preserver, more worthy of praise than false gods
- 69-70 The unbelievers scoff at the warnings of Muhammad
- 71-72 They shall certainly be destroyed as were those who rejected the prophets of old
- 73-77 Judgment on the wicked delayed through the mercy of God
- 78-80 The Qurʾān decides the points of controversy among the children of Israel
- 81 Muhammad comforted by the assurance of his integrity
- 82-83 Reprobate infidels blind to the error of their ways through the Beast of the Earth
- 84-90 Signs of judgment and doom of unbelievers
- 91 The righteous secure from the terror of judgment
- 92 The wicked shall be punished
- 93 Muhammad commanded to worship God, to be a Muslim, and to proclaim the Qurʾān

Sura 27 tells stories of the prophets Musa (Moses), Sulayman (Solomon), Saleh, and Lot (Arabic Lūṭ) to emphasize the message of tawhid (monotheism) in Arabian and Israelite prophets. The miracles of Moses, described in the Book of Exodus, are mentioned in opposition to the arrogance and kufr (disbelief) of the Pharaoh.

The story of Solomon is most detailed: Solomon converted Bilqis, Queen of Saba' (the Queen of Sheba) to the "true religion" after a hoopoe reported to him that she was a sun-worshipping queen. This sura was likely revealed to address the role of the "Children of Israel" among the believers in Mecca, to emphasize and commend the piety of past prophets, and to distinguish the present Qurʾānic message from traditions.

== Significance of title ==
The sura's name is taken from the ants whose conversations were understood by Solomon. Similar to suras ar-Ra'd "the Thunder" or al-Ankabut "the Spider", "The Ants" has no thematic significance in the Sura beyond it being a familiar phrase amongst believers, a reminder of the sura's story of Solomon.

Ants do hold a privileged status among animals in Islam on account of the story of Solomon. Hadith literature tells of Muhammad forbidding Muslims to kill the ant, bee, hoopoe, or shrike; it is no coincidence that they are all featured in an-Naml and an-Nahl "the Bee". One interpretation for the ant's theological significance coincides with its role historically. As written in the 1993 edition of the Encyclopaedia of Islam:

Since early antiquity, ants have been an object of admiration on account of ... the feverish activity with which they provide for their 27th chapter (surah) of the Qur'an with 93 verses (ayat) sustenance and the perfect organisation of their societies. This perfect organization under one cause correlates well with the Islamic idea of obedience, or ibadah.

== Main concepts ==
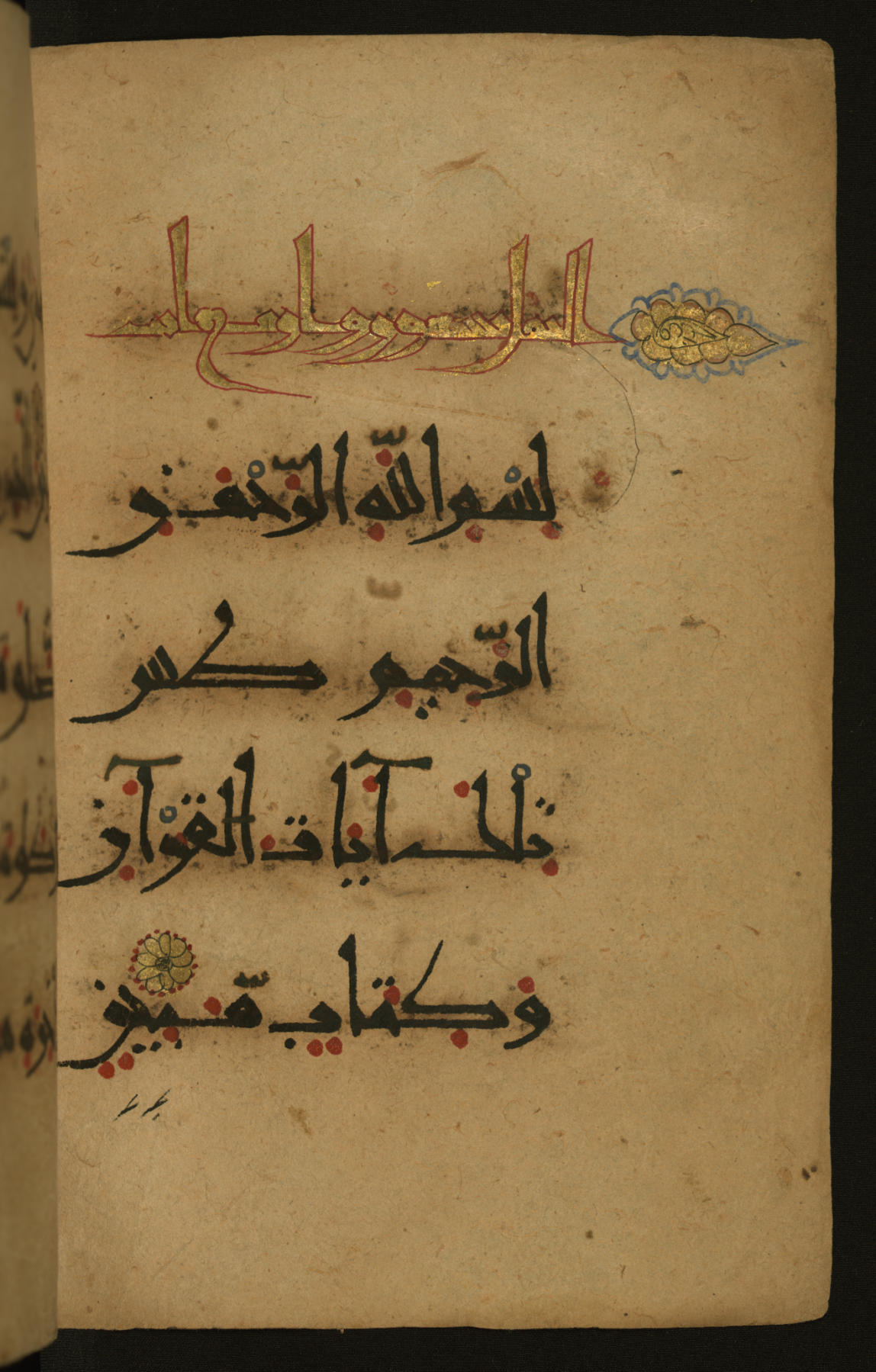
Chapter heading for sura 27 (Surat al-Naml), Walters Art Museum manuscript

- Tawhid was preached by many Israelite prophets as well as Arabian prophets prior to Qur'anic revelation.
- "Truly, this Qur'an explains to the Children of Israel most of what they differ about, and it is guidance and grace for those who believe."
- God has no equal as a creator; all those who associate others with God are guilty of shirk.
- Earthly knowledge is nothing compared to God; only those with open ears and eyes will turn to God.
- Disbelievers of the message of God will have no hope come Judgement Day.
- The revelation is a clear warning. Sura 27 reiterates that all humanity must turn to God without delay.

== Chronology ==
Sura 27 is agreed to be a Meccan surah from the middle of the Meccan period. Tafsir al-Jalalayn notes that some exceptions exist: ayat 52-55 are from the Medinan period; aya 85 was revealed during the Hijra to Medina.

=== Nöldeke's Chronology ===
Orientalist Theodor Nöldeke's chronology places Sura 27 as 68th out of 114. He places it amongst the 21 suras of the Second Meccan Period (See Muhammad in Mecca). (The Meccan period is estimated to be from 610 to 622 CE.) Nöldeke estimates an-Naml to be preceded by al-Isra' and followed by al-Kahf. All three suras use allusions to Judaism and the stories of Moses in particular.

=== Egyptian Chronology ===
Standard Islamic Egyptian chronology places an-Naml as 48th out of 114. In this order, it comes before al-Qasas "the Story" and after ash-Shu'ara "the Poets", following its order in the standard 'Uthmanic Qur'an (see History of the Qur'an). Amongst all three suras and all suras numbered between 19 and 32, the account of revelation begins with "mysterious letters," the meaning of which is speculated among some and among others remains unknown; they are speculated to have been variant Arabic dialects. Sura 27 begins with the words "Ta Sin." As evident in Tafsīr al-Jalālayn, these words are sometimes interpreted as mysteries of God – signs to believe.

== Structure ==
Sura 27, as a mid-Meccan Period sura, can be interpreted multiple ways in terms of structure. Thematically speaking, the sura progresses across several subjects:

1. Declaration of Qur'an – (In Sura 27:1, the Qur'an refers to itself consciously as a scripture, meant to make all clear.)
2. Moses's Signs are ignored by the Pharaoh
3. Solomon realizes God's blessings and dedicates himself to God's service.
4. The Queen of Sheba deals well with Solomon and acts generously with him.
5. The Queen of Sheba, one from disbelievers, converts and devotes herself to tawhid.
6. The people of Thamud disregard the warnings of Salih; Lot is likewise rejected by his people. The disbelievers are thus destroyed for scheming.
7. Declaration of God's universality, omniscience, and omnipotence – The Sura's phrasing condemns forgetting God's omnipotence.
8. Declaration of Abandonment of Disbelievers – Prophet is to wash his hands of them.
9. Foretelling of Judgement (see Islamic view of the Last Judgment) and Indication of Signs.
10. Reiteration of Qur'an's purpose as a Warning.

=== Straight-forward interpretation ===
According to a chronological reading of the text, the Sura ends on a bold note of warning. This is a perfectly valid reading of the text. Tafsīr al-Jalālayn concurs with this reading, suggesting in reference to ayat 91-93 that the prophet's duty is only to warn; the powerful, imminent tone expressed supports the conclusion that the final point of the Sura is the focal point.

=== Ring structure ===
Another valid reading of the text uses ring structure (see Chiastic structure). Favored in prominent modern scholar of Qur'anic studies Carl Ernst's interpretations of certain middle to late Meccan period suras, it can be applied to Sura 27 as well. In ring structure, the focal point of the piece is found in the center, surrounded front and back by parallel statements. (Such parallel statements could elaborate on one another, contrast each other, or affirm one another. Multiple interpretations exist.) One could interpret Sura 27 as follows:

1. Declaration of Qur'an through a reiterative warning of its purpose.
2. Moses's signs are ignored by Pharaoh.
3. An indication of signs with a foretelling of judgement.
4. Solomon, realizing God's blessings, dedicates himself as a Believer.
5. The Queen of Sheba is generous with Solomon, and deals well with him. She converts from disbelief, then devotes herself to tawhid.
6. After rejecting their prophets, God destroys the Sodomites, and the people of Thamud, leading to a general declaration of abandonment for disbelievers.
7. The conclusive interpretation from ring structure: A rebuke of disbelief through a declaration of God's omnipotence, omnipresence, and omniscience.
