= Surah Sad =

38th chapter of the Qur'an

Surah 38 of the Quran
ص Ṣād Sad
- Qira'ah; English text
- Classification: Meccan
- Position: Juzʼ 23
- No. of verses: 88
- No. of Rukus: 5
- No. of Sajdahs: 1 (Ayat 24)
- No. of words: 818
- No. of letters: 3020

Kufic fragment of Sura Sad, lines 62–64, late 9th century C.E.

Surah Ṣad (Arabic: ص, Ṣād; "The Letter Sad") is the 38th chapter (sūrah) of the Qur'an with 88 verses (āyāt) and 1 sajdah ۩ (38:24). Sad (ص ) is the name of the eighteenth letter in the Arabic alphabet.

According to the traditional Islamic narrative, the surah was sent to the Islamic prophet Muhammad by God while he was coping with rejection from his tribe, the Quraysh. It recounts stories of previous prophets, describes the splendors of heaven, and warns of the monstrosities of hell.

Regarding the timing and contextual background of the believed revelation (asbāb al-nuzūl), it is an earlier "Meccan surah", which means it is believed to have been revealed in Mecca, rather than later in Medina. The surah dates to the 2nd Meccan Period, meaning it was revealed only five or six years into the development of Islam.

== Summary ==
- 1 The letter Sad, By the Quran, full of reminders.
- 2 Unbelievers are addicted to pride and contention
- 3 They are unmoved by the fate of former infidels
- 4 They wonder at their warner, and call him a sorcerer and a liar
- 5-6 The Divine unity is denied by the infidels as a marvellous error
- 7-9 The confederates are challenged
- 10-13 Former bands of confederate infidels destroyed
- 14-15 Judgment impending over the scoffers of Makkah
- The story of David 16 He was a true believer 17-18 Mountains and birds joined him in praising God 19 He is endowed with a kingdom, wisdom etc. 20-23 He is rebuked by the two adversaries 23 ۩ 24 David repents his fault and is forgiven 25-27 He is exhorted to judge righteously 28 He receives the Book of Psalms
- The story of Solomon 29 He is a devout servant of God 30-31 Reviewing his horses, he forgets his prayers 32 He slays the horses to atone for his neglect 33-34 The trial of the counterfeit body 35-39 The wind and the devils are made subject to Solomon
- The story of Job 40 He cries to God in his calamity against Satan 41 God discovers fountains of water for his comfort 42 His family and property restored him double 43 He chastises his wife in fulfilment of his oath 43-44 He is patient and prayerful
- 45-48 Other prophets commended as examples of piety
- 49-55 Paradise, its glories described
- 55-58 Hell, its miseries delineated
- 59-61 Idolaters and their leaders shall mutually reproach each other in hell
- 62-64 They shall not find the Muslims there
- 65-68 Muhammad enjoined to preach against idolatry
- 69-74 The story of the creation of Adam and the fall of Iblis revealed to Muhammad
- 75-77 Iblīs refuses to worship Adam through pride
- 78-82 God curses Iblīs, but respites him till the resurrection-day
- 83-84 Iblís declares to God he will seduce mankind, except the servants of God
- 85 God declares his purpose to fill hell with Satan and his followers
- 86 Muhammad asks no reward for his services
- 87-88 The Quran an admonition yet to be vindicated before unbelievers

== Historical context ==
Sura 38 substantiates Muhammad's role as Prophet through concrete examples of previous messengers of God and the evils that have befallen the people who did not heed sacred messages. Angelika Neuwirth, a German Quranic scholar, terms these “retribution legends” (McAuliffe, 105). They “prove that divine justice is at work in history, the unjustly harassed being rewarded with salvation, the transgressors and unbelievers punished by annihilation” (McAuliffe, 106). Through regular reference to biblical characters and a self-assertive tone praising both Muhammad and God, the reader can attribute this sura to the 2nd Meccan Period, according to Noldeke's chronology . The coherent text builds up to descriptions of both heaven and hell on the Day of Judgment. The wide scope of Biblical figures—ranging from Old Testament characters such as David, Solomon, and Job, to the devil of Islam, Iblis—were designed to resonate with a wide audience in the face of the disbelief among the Quraysh, Muhammad's clan; as Ernst poignantly states, Muhammad was likely dealing with “religiously well-informed skeptics”. Like many contemporary passages, Sura 38 attempts to convert the reader to a monotheistic religion honoring Muhammad as Prophet by promising salvation for true believers on the Day of Judgment.

== General divisions of sura 38 ==
Most Middle and Late Meccan suras can be divided into three sections by content and style- a tripartite division. Examination of the structure of a sura can make what seems like an elliptical compilation of sentences far more comprehensible. Symmetrical structure, also known as ring composition, can help both the novice and experienced reader find the central message. Sura 38 can first be divided into three primary sections: the first from verses 1–11; the second, 12–64; the third, 66–88. The first and third sections, similar in length, remind the reader of the power of God and the Qur'an by describing destruction and hell, the third section going so far as to describe the creation of evil: the fall of Iblis, who becomes Satan.

The larger center section (12-64) gives examples of biblical figures like David, Solomon, and Job to Muhammad as Messengers who also faced adversity. In the middle portion of the sura, God concisely tells Muhammad to “Remember Our servants Abraham, Isaac, and Jacob, all men of strength and vision. We caused them to be devoted to Us…with Us they will be among the elect, the truly good…This is a lesson” (Q38:45-49). The historical context of the sura confirms that this is indeed its central message: supposedly, Muhammad was struggling with rejection from his tribe, the Quraysh, so God sent this revelation to support and encourage him. As entrance to heaven is the final goal of Islam, nothing could serve as better inspiration to Muhammad to persevere in the face of adversity. Nevertheless, one must keep in mind that as Islam gained followers and adapted to continue its growth, the clear divisions within suras blur and texts slowly become lengthier and more expansive works; the reader cannot always find three, let alone two, clear-cut sections. Even within Sura 38, the subject and tone can shift every few verses from general descriptions of heaven and hell to short examples of specific prophets.

=== 1-11 comments made by nonbelievers ===
The surah opens with comments made by nonbelievers confused by the Prophet’s portents.

Verse 8: the nonbelievers do not try to understand warnings: they blatantly “doubt” (Q38:8). God warns that they “have not tasted My torment yet” (Q38.8). He tells Muhammad to “bear their words patiently” (Q38.17), given the historical context of disbelief among the Quraysh. verse 17 recounts stories of specific messengers to the Prophet.

=== 12-64 Transition to the Day of Judgment and hell ===
Transition from general warnings to exemplar People of the Book and, later, a description of the Day of Judgment and hell.

==== 17 Patience ====
Patience (Verse 17): Muhammad is told to 'bear their words patiently' (Q38.17) by God, “they” referring to the Quraysh, given the historical context of their disbelief. This marks the transition from generalizations about the disbelieving peoples of the past to stories of specific messengers.

==== 17-26 Story of David and the Two Litigants ====
The tone and style of Sura 38 become more specific, both in examples of previous prophets and their stories. For example: verses 17-26 chronicle David as he errs during a test God gives him, but quickly “fell down on his knees, and repented” (Q38.24). Unlike those of the early Meccan Period, suras of the 2nd Meccan Period often reference biblical characters as Muhammad tried to convert the Quraish population to Islam by finding common ground between their faiths. Though there is no evidence to prove this, it is believed that Muhammad was illiterate. Muhammad's inability to read supports the authenticity of his revelations from God as uninfluenced by any knowledge he could have gained from texts of the time. However, trade influx, therefore multicultural exchanges, during the age of Muhammad could explain his literacy on Judeo-Christian knowledge .

The crowds to whom Muhammad spoke likely already knew the story of David. According to the Bible, the story of David and the Two Litigants was a test of God. The Qur'anic version of the story differs slightly from the biblical version, but the ultimate message is the same. In the Muslim tradition, though David already has many wives, he asks a man to divorce his only wife because David wants her for himself. Disapproving of David's selfishness, God sends two brothers, one with ninety-nine ewes, the other with only one, to David. He is asked to decide whether it is fair for the brother with ninety-nine ewes to take the only ewe of his brother, a clear parallel to David taking another man's only wife. As David tells the men that it is wrong for the one with many ewes to take the only ewe of his brother, he realizes the error of his ways, referencing his relations with Bathsheba, the former wife of Uriah the Hittite, and begs God for forgiveness as referenced in 2 Samuel 12.

==== 30-40: Story of Solomon ====
The Qur'an also references Solomon, son of David, as a devoted Messenger who realizes the error of his ways and is forgiven by God. With further research, one uncovers the story referred to in Sura 38: Solomon is more devoted to his horses than to God, and misses prayer sessions while indulging in the hoofed creatures’ company. He justifies his obsession, saying, “My love of fine things is part of my remembering my Lord!” God knows this is not true, is displeased with the king and “[reduces] him to a mere skeleton on his throne” as punishment. Eventually Solomon realizes that God has been testing him. According to Muslim legend, Solomon slaughters all his horses to prove his devotion to God, and God forgives him, granting him great power over the earth.

Like the Qur'an does of David, Solomon's positive attributes are emphasized, even though he too “yielded to certain temptations on the road to faith” (Tottoli, 35). However, Solomon was granted even greater powers by God than his father was. A particularly miraculous one was his over the wind, so that he could travel over his immense territory quickly. Solomon could speak to animals and was commander over a rank of jinn, or invisible spirits. The Torah even claims that God made Solomon so wise that kings from all over the land traveled to hear him speak. (2 Chronicles 9:14).

==== 55-64: The Day of Judgment ====
One does not have to be a prophet to have a fruitful afterlife. Through verse 49, the Qur'an repeats that the reward for devout followers “will be nearness to Us, and a good place to return to” (Q38.49). The reader is called by descriptions of heaven through verse 54, in which rich words like “bliss” and “abundant” are used. Such enticing information becomes particularly important when contrasted with a long description of Hell, lasting from verses 55–64, which includes a bone-chilling description of what hell tastes like: “a scalding, dark, foul fluid” (Q38.58). The Qur'an describes this Day of Judgment with increasingly vivid descriptions as Islam develops. This one is particularly scary, arresting multiple senses and capturing the reader in a dark, seemingly inescapable cloud of perpetual agony.

==== Other Biblical characters ====
This Sura also references Noah, Job, Abraham, Isaac, Jacob, Ishmael, and Elijah. Of these only the story of Job is elaborated on, providing a third major example of overcoming “adversity” (Q 38:44) to become a noteworthy messenger of the past.

==== 63 Day of Reckoning ====
In verse 63, God repeats to Muhammad that he must warn the masses against this Day of Reckoning, that God will forgive those who seek forgiveness but only if they heed the Prophet's warnings.

=== 66-88 The holiness and validity of the Qur’an ===
The Sura ends with three short verses maintaining the holiness and validity of the Qur’an, just as it begins with a verse saying “By the Qur’an with its reminding” (Q38.1).

==== 71-85: Story of Iblis and Hell ====
Humility is key to acceptance in heaven. God recounts the story of Iblis’ rejection from heaven and God’s generous compromise with him, giving him “respite till the Appointed Day”, when God will then “fill Hell with you and all those that follow you” (Q38.80-85).

However, there is a more interesting explanation for the creation of Satan. He exists to tempt us, and prove our true devotion to God. God warns humans that Satan will tempt them, lead them astray; and this test for the believer must be passed with the most strict devotion to God.

== Forgiveness ==
God is "Oft-Forgiving"; He is also Just, punishing those who have done wrong. In Sura 38, God speaks of entire civilizations wiped out because they did not believe (e.g. Q:38 10–17). However, the Sura suggests that God will forgive a believer if his faith is strong and true and he repents for his misdeeds. We, too, can be saved by God and given a place in heaven on the Day of Judgment.

However, Sura 38 is unique in the number of concrete examples it gives of biblical figures who have served God. Though Muhammad faces adversity among his own people, the tone of this Sura is more confident in the essential truth behind Islam than earlier Suras. This faith is exemplified by the emphasis on forgiveness for all, although the reader can have no doubt about God's wrath on the disbeliever and His Absolute Power over all.

== Exegesis ==
Ja'far al-Sadiq, in a written letter to his companions, advises them to observe Taqiya when dealing with "liars and hypocrites" because the status of the "people of falsehood" is different to Allah than the status of the "people of truth", hence he cites the following verse from Surah Sad in support of this:

Or should we treat those who believe and do righteous deeds like corrupters in the land? Or should We treat those who fear Allah like the wicked?" (38:28)
