= An-Nahl =

16th chapter of the Qur'an

Surah 16 of the Quran
النحل An-Naḥl The Bees
- Qira'ah; English text
- Classification: Meccan
- Position: Juzʼ 14
- Hizb no.: 27 to 28
- No. of verses: 128
- No. of Rukus: 16
- No. of Sajdahs: 1 (verse 50)
- No. of words: 1846
- No. of letters: 7723

The Bee (Arabic: الْنَّحْل; an-naḥl) is the 16th chapter (sūrah) of the Qur'an, with 128 verses (āyāt). It is named after honey bees mentioned in verse 68, and contains a comparison of the industry and adaptability of honey bees with the industry of man.

Regarding the timing and contextual background of the believed revelation (asbāb al-nuzūl), it is an "Meccan surah" during the last period, which means it is believed to have been revealed in Mecca, instead of later in Medina.

== Summary ==
- 1 God's judgment sure to be visited on the infidels
- 2 Revelation is from God by the ministry of angels
- 3–8 God the Creator, as his works testify
- 9 God the true instructor of man
- 10–14 His works in heaven, earth, and sea described
- 15 The earth made firm by the mountains
- 16 The stars appointed to guide man
- 17 God not to be compared to idols
- 18–19 God merciful and omniscient
- 20–21 The character of the idols declared
- 22 Infidels reject the one true God
- 23 The Omniscient hates the proud
- 24 The unbelievers accuse Muhammed of fables
- 25–26 The unbelievers shall be destroyed
- 27–28 Idolaters will be disappointed in the resurrection
- 29–31 The reward of the righteous
- 32–34 Infidels can only look for judgement
- 35 They lay their crimes to God's charge
- 36 Every nation has its own prophet
- 37 The dreadful end of infidelity
- 38 The infidels deny the resurrection
- 39 They shall be taught their error
- 40 God creates by a word
- 41-42 The patient & persecuted to be rewarded in the next life
- 43 Promises to the Muhájirín
- 44 The patient believer will be rewarded
- 45 The custodians of the Scriptures to be inquired of
- 46 The Quran sent to be proclaimed to the people
- 47–49 The Prophet's enemies will be punished
- ۩ 50–52 All God's creatures worship him
- 53–55 The true God to be worshipped and obeyed
- 56–58 Idolaters are ungrateful
- 59–61 Hating daughters, the Quraish attribute daughters to God
- 62–63 The human race dependent on God's mercy
- 64 Idolatry unreasonable
- 65 Satan the patron of the ungodly
- 66 Why the Quran was sent
- 67–69 God's witness to himself in nature
- 70–71 The bee taught of God
- 72–74 All man is and all he has is of God
- 75 Yet man worships idols
- 76 God not to be likened to anything
- 77 The parable of a slave and his master
- 78 The parable of the blind man and one having sight
- 79 The affairs of the judgment-day shall be accomplished in a moment
- 80–83 God to be obeyed because he is Creator and Preserver
- 84 Muhammad only a public preacher
- 85 Idolaters recognise God's mercy and yet deny him
- 86–87 Idolaters shall be deserted by their idols
- 88–89 Every nation has a witness against it
- 90 Infidel leaders to be severely punished
- 91 Muhammad is God's witness against the Arabians
- 92–99 Exhortation to loyalty to God
- 100 Muhammad to have recourse to God in reading the Quran
- 101–102 Satan has no power over believers
- 103 The doctrine of abrogation announced
- 104 The Quran sent down by the "holy spirit"
- 105 Muhammad charged with writing the Quran with foreign help
- 106–107 The unbelievers shall be punished
- 108 Forced apostasy no offence against God
- 108–110 Wilful apostates condemned
- 111 The Muhájirín blessed
- 112 The rewards of the judgment-day will be just
- 113–114 Makkah punished by famine for unbelief
- 115–119 Lawful and unlawful food
- 120 Sins of ignorance may be pardoned
- 121–124 Muhammad exhorted to adopt the religion of Abraham
- 125 Friday to be observed instead of the Sabbath
- 126 Infidels not to be treated harshly
- 127 Patient forbearance better than vengeance
- 128 God is with the righteous

This surah warns against polytheism, saying that the pagan gods cannot create anything, and against comparisons between God and any created beings. It praises God for giving the Earth with all its wealth to mankind. According to this surah, all wonders of the natural world, such as seas, stars and mountains, are proofs of God's infinite power. Verse 66 speaks of the miracle in milk formation in cattle: "From what is within their bodies, between excretions and blood, We produce for your drink, milk, pure and agreeable to those who drink it." Verse 67 speaks of the miracle of the vine: "And from the fruit of the date-palm and the vine, ye get out strong drink and wholesome food: behold, in this also is a sign for those who are wise". Verse 103 addresses the allegations that Muhammad has invented the Qur'an.

And your Lord taught the honey bee to build its cells in hills, on trees, and in (men's) habitations; Then to eat of all the produce (of the earth), and find with skill the spacious paths of its Lord: there issues from within their bodies a drink of varying colours, wherein is healing for men: verily in this is a Sign for those who give thought.
