= Tanzil =

Descent of God's message to Muhammad in Islam

Tanzīl (Arabic: تنزيل, lit. 'sending down'), inzāl (إنزال, 'bringing down'), and nuzūl (نزول, 'descending'), and other words based on the Arabic triconsonantal root n-z-l (ن ز ل, 'downward movement'), refers to the Islamic belief in the descent of God's message from heaven to Earth as speech, and sometimes visual, revelations to the Islamic prophet Muhammad with Gabriel as the conveyor, and occasionally God Himself.

In the Quran forms of these words are found in verse Q 17:105:

- "And with the truth We have sent it [i.e., the Qur’ān] down, and with the truth it has descended." (وَبِالْحَقِّ أَنْزَلْنَاهُ وَبِالْحَقِّ نَزَلَ wa-bil-ḥaqq-i anzalnāh-u wa-bil-ḥaqq-i nazal).

== Process ==
The Quran refers to its original source as the “mother of the book” (umm al-kitāb) which is located in the presence of Allah (God). The Quran itself also calls this a “well-guarded tablet” (lawḥ mahfūz) a “concealed book” (kitāb maknūn). It describes the revelation to Muhammad as being dictated by the angel Jabril, not by Allah himself, and Muhammad as a messenger of Allah. While the Quran descends, in the Quran Allah himself is never described as coming down, but is sometimes mentioned in ḥadīth as going from higher to lower heavens.

It is thought that the basic units of revelation of the Quran were short passages or verses (āyāt). Later these ayat were arranged into surahs under (Muslims believe) divine guidance.

In his tafsīr, Ibn Kathīr cited a hadīth from Abd Allāh ibn ʿAbbās:

Ibn ʿAbbās and others have said, "Allāh sent the Qurʾān down all at one time (jumlah wāḥidah) from the Preserved Tablet (al-Lawḥ al-Maḥfūẓ) to the House of Might (Bayt al-ʿIzzah), which is in the heaven of this world. Then it came down in parts to the Messenger of Allah based upon the incidents that occurred over a period of twenty-three years."

Therefore, the Quran descended in two stages. Firstly, the Qurʾān descended (inzāl) from the Lawḥ al-Maḥfūẓ (Preserved Tablet) to the Bayt al-ʿIzzah in the lowest heaven (al-samāʾ al-dunyā). It happened in the Night of Destiny (Laylat al-qadr). Secondly, the Qurʾān descended (tanzīl) from Bayt al-ʿIzzah to the worldly realm to be revealed to Muhammad by Gabriel piecemeal in stages (mufarriqan or tafṣīlan) over 23 years until the whole Quran was completely revealed.

According to Ṭabāṭabāʾī inzāl is "a sudden act of sending down at once" and tanzīl is "a gradual act of sending."

Muhammad's first encounter with the archangel Gabriel produced the first five verses of the ninety-sixth chapter of the present Quran, the chapter of The Clot (Surat al-‘Alaq)

One quranic verse replies to those who ask why the Quran was revealed over time and not all at once:

And those who disbelieve say, "Why was the Qur’an not revealed to him all at once?" Thus [it is] that We may strengthen thereby your heart. And We have spaced it distinctly.

— Quran 25:32

Some commentators believe that the Quran was revealed to Muhammad twice. In addition to the gradual 23 year revelation until his death, there was an 'immediate revelation' that happened on the Laylat al-Qadr. This is based on an understanding of sūrah Al-Qadr:1 as referring to descent of the Quran in its entirety. ʿAbd Allāh ibn ʿAbbās reports that, "… descended in Ramaḍān, on the Laylat al-Qadr in one lay down (jumlah جملة), …"

== Asbab al-nuzul ==
According to ḥadīth, the circumstances that verses were sent down in, and the study of why and how a particular verses was revealed is known as Asbāb al-nuzūl (‘occasions of revelation’). Abu al-Hassan Alī bin Ahmad al-Wahidī an-Naisabūrī (d. 1075), has been called the father of the field of asbāb al-nuzūl, he argued that understanding the reasons/circumstances for a given revelation was crucial to resolve apparent inconsistencies in the Quran.

According to the scholar al-Suyūṭī who wrote a book on Asbāb al-nuzūl, revelations came down for two basic reasons:

1. "divine initiative", i.e. because God decided to send and reveal something. Examples being the first revelation to Muhammad at Ḥirāʾ, or the ayat calling for the Fast of Ramaḍān
2. To address some situation "directly and immediately", or to respond and answer a question someone had raised. An example being the sūrah ‘The Spoils’ (al-Anfāl) that came down concerning the situations in the aftermath of the Battle of Badr.

According to a number of scholars the asbāb (occasion) of revelation can only properly be determined through "direct transmission from those who actually witnessed the event of revelation" (Abū al-Hassan ʿAlī bin Ahmad al-Waḥidī an-Naisabūrī), and cannot be left to independent reasoning (ijtihād), nor legal consensus (ijmāʿ) (al-Zarkashī). which means in effect ḥadīth reports coming from the canons of ḥadīth or available in works of Islamic historiography, or works of tafsīr. Unfortunately "very frequently" aḥādīth on asbāb contradict each other and this "calls into question the reliability of the asbāb genre".

== See also ==
- Waḥy
