= Sujud =

Prostrating oneself during salah

Sujud/Sujood
- Worshipper performing Sujood
- Official name: Sujud/Sujood
- Also called: Sajdah, Prostration in Islam
- Observed by: Muslims and Islam
- Type: Islamic
- Significance: A way that Muslim worshippers prostrate and humble themselves before God while glorifying him
- Observances: Sujud during Salah; Sujud Sahwi; Sujud Shukr; Sujud Tilawa
- Frequency: Twice in every raka'at of Salah, amongst others
- Related to: Salah, Tilawa, Allah, Alhamdulillah, Prostration, Islam, Sunnah, Fardh, Muhammad, Muhammad in Islam

Sujud (Arabic: سُجُود, romanized: sujūd, pronounced [sʊˈdʒuːd]), or sajdah (سَجْدَة, [ˈsadʒ.da]), also known as sijda, sejda or shejda, in Islam is the act of low bowing or prostration to God facing the qiblah (direction of the Kaaba at Mecca). It is usually done in standardized prayers (salah). The position involves kneeling and bowing till one touches the ground with seven bones (points): the forehead and nose, two hands, two knees and two sets of toes. In accordance with the Sunnah (the Way) of Muhammad, one's elbows should be far from one's body, unless it causes discomfort to other worshippers, but not resting on the ground. Some scholars hold the position that this applies only to men, and that women are encouraged to tuck their elbows in out of modesty.

== Overview ==
Sujud (prostration) is one of the main pillars of daily prayer (salah) in Islam. A single act of sujud is called a sajdah (plural sajdāt). Muslims perform sujud several times during each prayer, depending on the number of raka'at of prayer: two sajadat are performed every raka'ah, and prayers vary in obligatory length between two and four raka'at (additional supererogatory raka'at are often performed as sunnah muakkadah, or emulation of the example of Muhammad as represented in the sahih hadith). A raka'ah is a unit of set actions that have to be performed in a prayer. The shortest fard (obligatory) Muslim prayer is that of fajr, performed immediately before sunrise (two raka'ahs) and the shortest ever possible number of raka'ahs is in the witr prayer, which is considered Sunnah in the Maaliki, Shafi'i and Hanbali Madhabs (schools of Fiqh) and Wajib (compulsory) in the Hanafi madhab, with one needing an odd number of Rakats to complete the prayer, with one being valid in all madhabs but the Hanafi Madhab. The raka'ah can be described as follows:

1. Standing and saying Allahu akbar, reciting surah al-Fatiha, and reciting a passage of the Quran such as sura al-Ikhlas.
2. Performing ruku' (bowing down) without bending the knees and with hands resting on the knees, while reciting additional phrases to glorify Allah.
3. Standing up from bowing, and reciting further.
4. Going in prostration (sajdah) once, while reciting additional specific phrases to glorify Allah.
5. Lifting the face up from prostration but kneeling or sitting on the ground.
6. Performing a second prostration (sajdah).
7. Rising for the second, third, or fourth raka'ah. In the last raka'ah, one remains sitting and recites the tashahhud, and then performs the taslim by turning the head to the right and saying, as-salamu alaikum wa rahmatu Allah wa barakatuh ("may the peace, mercy, and blessings of God be upon you"), and then turning the head to the left and repeating the blessing to conclude the prayer.

Points 1–7 define one raka'ah. Thus, the shortest prayer, that of fajr, contains four sajadat. For Hanafis, witr prayer is three raka'ahs, which is for them considered wajib, a level of necessity below that of fard but above all else: in practice, this makes witr obligatory.

In Twelver Shia law, the forehead is placed on earth or on plant material which is neither eaten nor worn. Allowed surfaces include earth, stone and grass; Sistani considers the turbah of Husayn the best surface for prostration.

== Other types of sujud ==
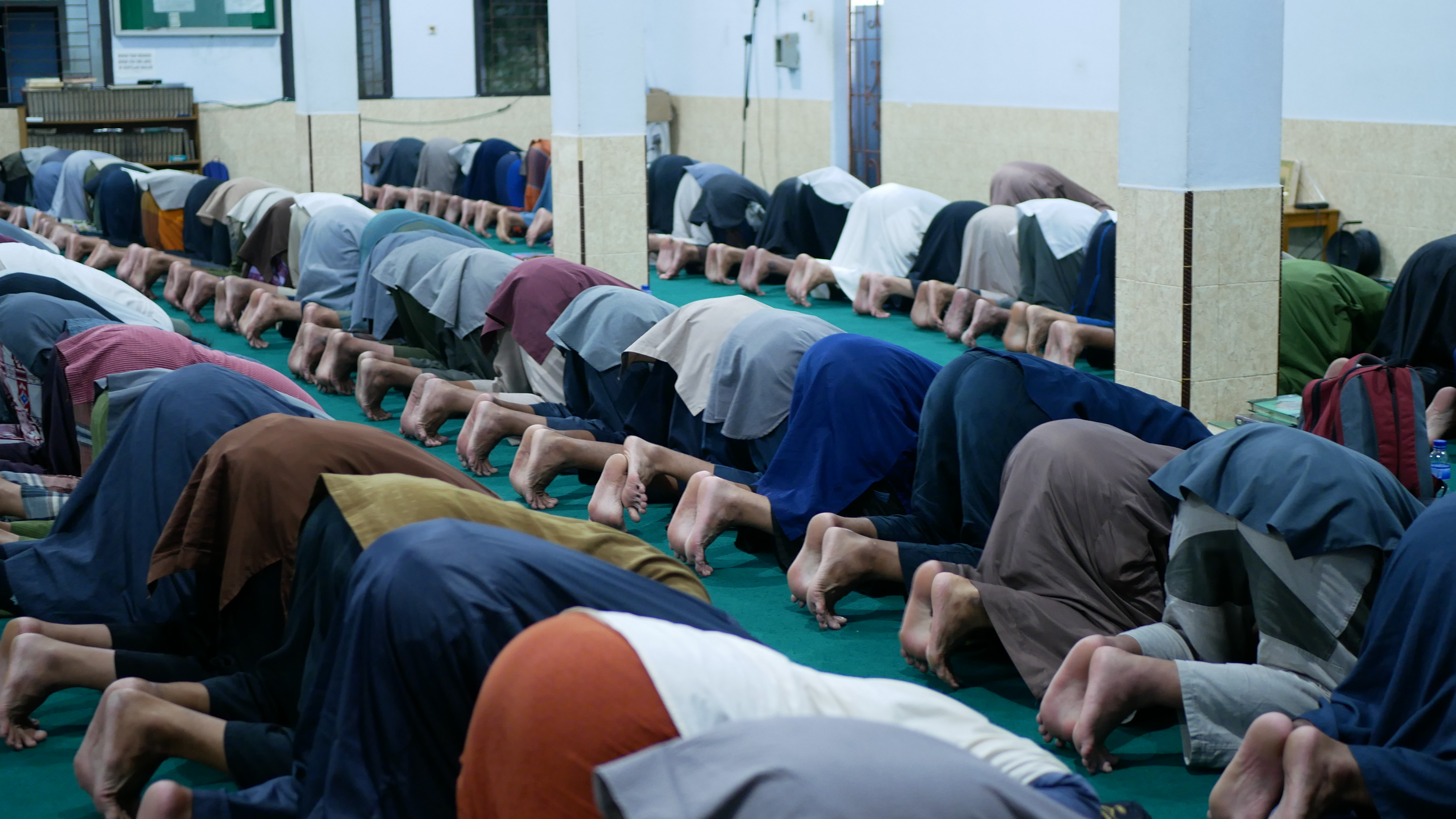
In Islam, Sujud (prostrations) occupy a quintessential position in the five obligatory daily formal prayers.

=== Sajdah of recitation / Tilawah ===
During recitation (tilawa) of the Qur'an, including individual and congregation prayers, there are fifteen places where Muslims believe, when Muhammad recited a certain verse (ayah), he prostrated to God. The verses are:

۩ Q7:206, al Aʿrāf
۩ Q13:15, ar-Raʻd
۩ Q16:49, an-Nahl
۩ Q17:107, al-Isra
۩ Q19:58, Maryam
۩ Q22:18, al-Hajj
۩ Q22:77, al-Hajj
۩ Q25:60, al-Furqan
۩ Q27:25, an-Naml
۩ Q32:15, as-Sajda
۩ Q38:24, Ṣād
۩ Q41:37, Fussilat
۩ Q53:62, an-Najm
۩ Q84:21, al-Inshiqaq
۩ Q96:19, al-Alaq

In most copies of the Qur'an these are indicated by the symbol ۩, with an over-line on the word/s that invoked the prostration. Muslims must prostrate once in order to follow the Sunnah (example) of Muhammad and recite any one or more of the following along with Takbeer before and after the sujud,

=== Sajdah of forgetfulness ===
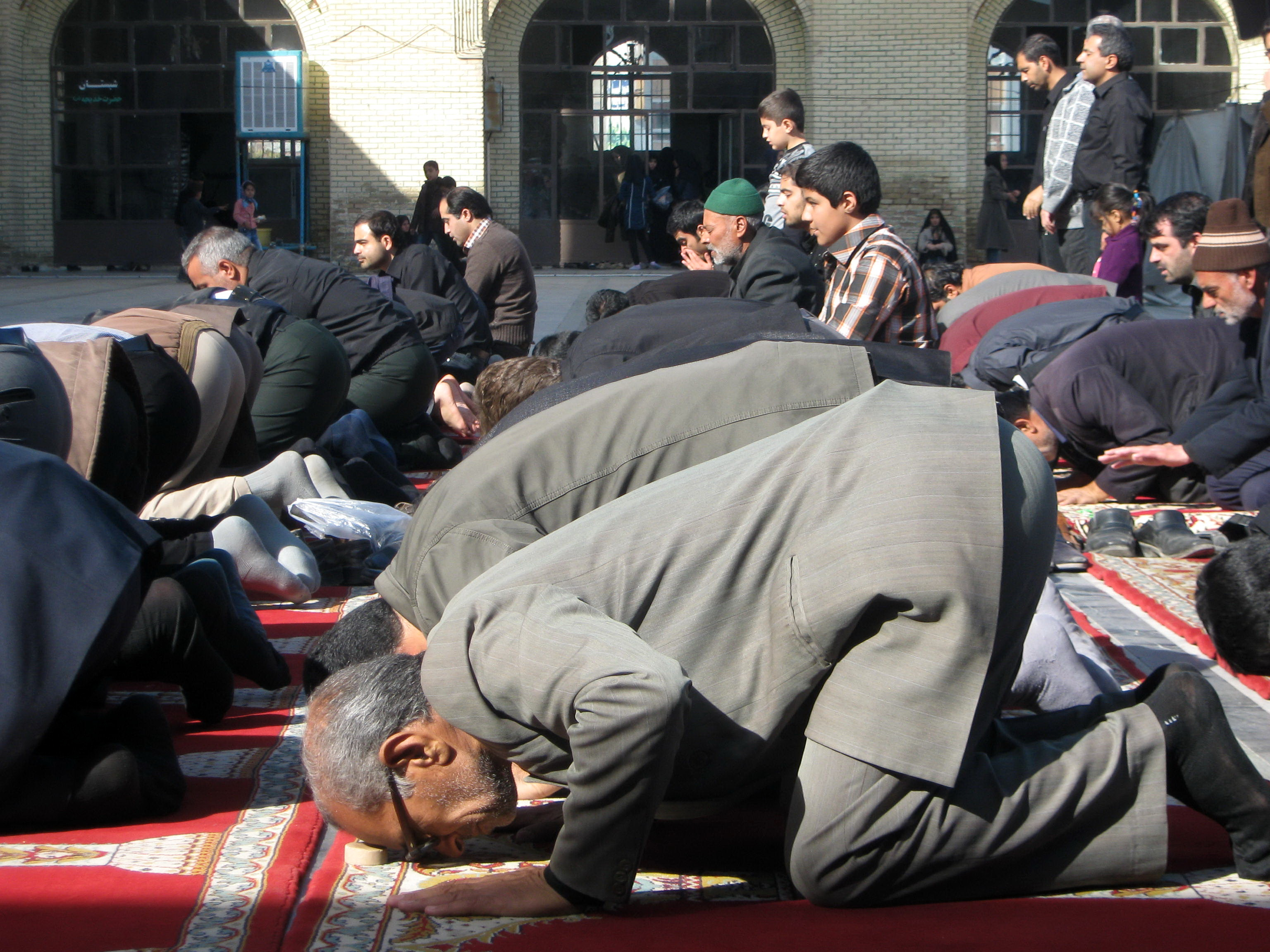
A Muslim prayer in Sujud, Grand Mosque of Nishapur, Khorasan, Iran.

Sujud Sahwi or Sajdah of forgetfulness occurs during the ritual salat prayer. Out of forgetfulness a person can either omit obligatory parts of salat (Qabli) or add to the salat (Ba'adi). In either case the person corrects their salat by doing the Sujud Sahwi.

== Direction of prostration ==
Sujud is made only to God. In prayer, Muslims face the Kaaba in Mecca, Saudi Arabia.

== See also ==
- Sujud Sahwi
- Zemnoy poklon, earth-low bowing in the Eastern Orthodox Church originating from Jewish low bowing
- Proskynesis
- Dogeza, prostration in Japanese culture
- Kowtow, prostration in Chinese culture
