= Al-Hajj =

22nd chapter of the Quran

Surah 22 of the Quran
الحج Al-Ḥajj The Pilgrimage
- Qira'ah; English text
- Classification: Medinan
- Position: Juzʼ 17
- Hizb no.: 34
- No. of verses: 78
- No. of Rukus: 9
- No. of Sajdahs: 2 (verse 18 (and verse 77 according to the Shafi'i madhhab))
- No. of words: 1439
- No. of letters: 5238

Al-Ḥajj (Arabic: الحج, al-ḥajj; meaning: "The Pilgrimage", "The Hajj") is the 22nd chapter (sūrah) of the Quran with 78 verses (āyāt). This surah takes its name from the 27th verse.

Regarding the timing and contextual background of the revelation, it is a Medinan chapter, which means it is believed to have been revealed in Medina rather than Mecca.

== Summary ==
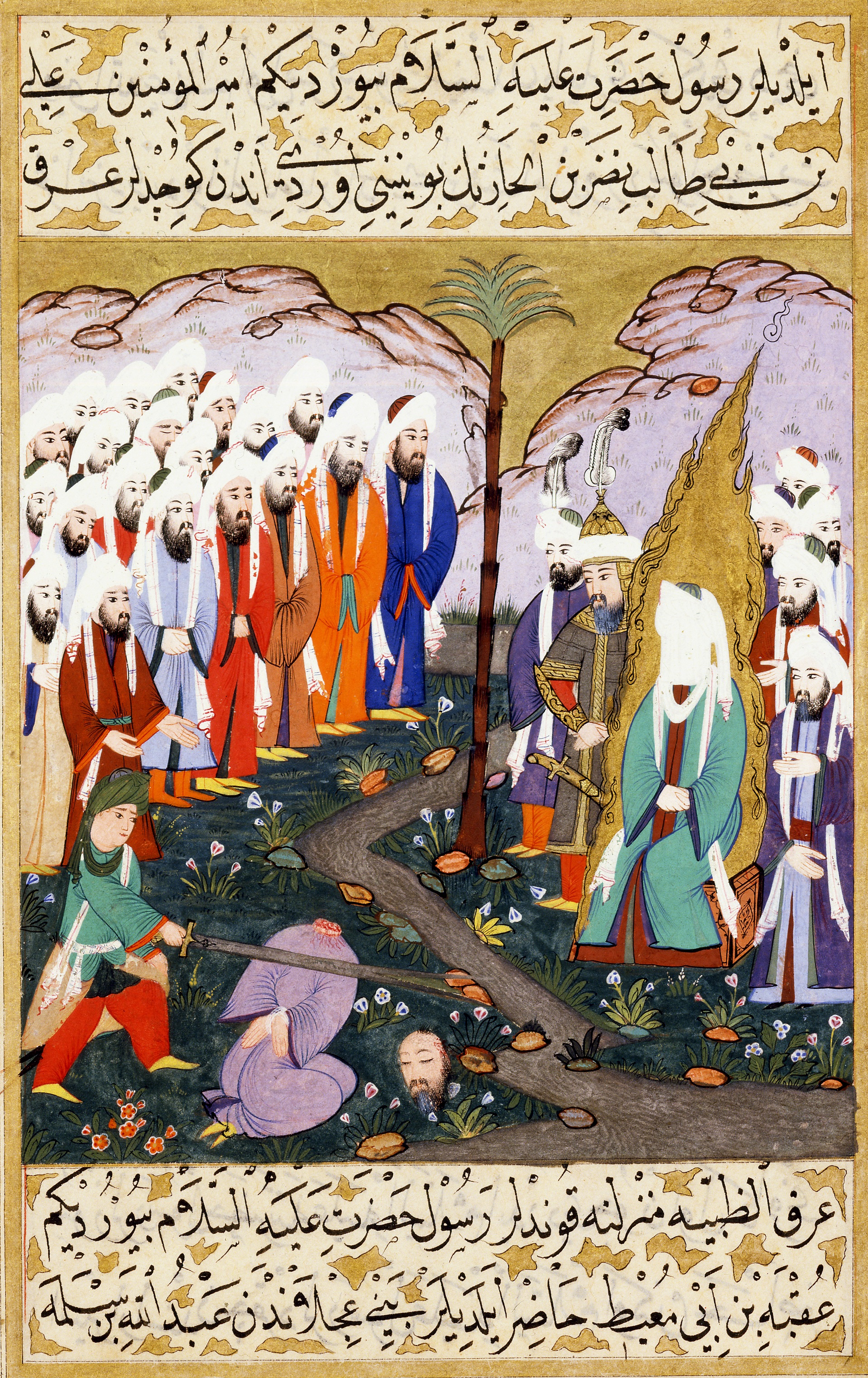
A painting from Siyer-i Nebi, Ali beheading Nadr ibn al-Harith in the presence of Muhammad and his companions.

- 1-2 The dreadful character of the Judgement Day
- 3-4 Nadr ibn al-Harith rebuked for his infidelity
- 5-7 Proofs of the doctrine of the resurrection
- 8-10 Abu Jahl's obstinate infidelity and its punishment
- 11-13 Hypocrites exposed and rebuked
- 14 God will reward the righteous
- 15-16 God will cause Muhammad and the Quran to triumph
- 17 God will judge between the followers of conflicting faiths
- ۩ 18 All creatures praise God
- 19-24 The awful fate of unbelievers contrasted with the joy of believers
- 25-26 Profaners of the Kaabah will be punished
- 27 God appointed the site of the Kaabah an abode for Abraham
- 28-32 The pilgrimage to Makkah instituted for Muslims
- 32-35 Rites to be observed by the pilgrims
- 36 Sacrifices appointed for the professors of every religion
- 37 The humble believer encouraged
- 38-39 The sacrifices at Madína symbolical of obedience to God
- 40-43 War against infidels permitted when in self-defence
- 44-45 All God's prophets have been accused of imposture
- 46-47 Infidels blind to God's judgments on the ungodly
- 48-49 Though God is forbearing he will punish unbelievers
- 50 Muhammad a public preacher
- 51-52 Reward and punishment of believers and infidels
- 53-55 All prophets have been subject to Satanic deception
- 56-58 The unbelievers incorrigible, but God will judge between them and the righteous
- 59-60 Blessed condition of the Muhájjarín and martyrs
- 61 Revenge of personal injuries permitted
- 62-67 God the Creator and Preserver of all things
- 68 Professors of other religions not to dispute with Muhammad
- 69-70 How Muhammad should treat those who dispute with him
- 71 The Omniscient God has decreed all things
- 72 Idolaters have no proof from God for their idolatry
- 73 Unbelievers (Quraish) ready to use violence towards the Muslims
- 74 The Makkan idols unable to keep the flies off themselves
- 75 Idolaters have a low estimate of the power of God
- 76 God chooses messengers from among men and angels
- ۩ 77 God knoweth all things, and all shall return to him
- 78 True believers exhorted to worship God and to fight in defence of his religion. Muslims exhorted to be steadfast in the faith of their father Abraham

== Background ==
Late 19th century Chinese scroll of the surah

The Sacred Mosque and the Pilgrimage (Ḥajj) were originally dedicated to God, but fell to idolatry in contemporary times, while worshippers of God had been suspended from visiting it. In this manner, consent for taking up arms against those despots has been given to remove them from that point and to set up the upright lifestyle for setting up prudence and eradicating evil. As indicated by Ibn Abbas, Mujahid, Urwah ibn Zubayr, Zayd ibn Aslam, Muqatil ibn Hayyan, Qatadah and other commentators, verse 39 is the first that gives the Muslims authorization to take up arms. Various hadiths and books on the life of Muhammad affirm that after this consent, real arrangements for war were begun and the very first expedition was sent to the shore of the Red Sea in Safar 2 AH (623/624 CE), known as the Patrol of Waddan.

== Topic and theme ==
This surah addresses: (1) The mushriks of Makkah, (2) the faltering Muslims, and (3) the genuine devotees. The mushriks have been cautioned in a mighty way with this impact: "You have adamantly and impudently persevered in your thoughts of ignorance and confided in your false-deities rather than Allah, however, they have no force at all and you have denied the Divine Messenger. Resultantly you will meet a similar end as has been the doom of those like you previously. You have just hurt yourselves by dismissing Our Prophet and by aggrieving the best of your own people; your false-deities will not have the option to spare you from the rage of God". Simultaneously, they have been advised consistently for their doctrine of shirk and sound contentions have been given for Tauhid and the Hereafter.

The faltering Muslims, who entered Islam, yet did not want to face any difficulty in its path, have been advised with this impact: "What is this faith of yours? From one viewpoint, you are prepared to have faith in Allah and become His workers given you are harmony and thriving, and if you meet with torments and hardships in His path, you dispose of your Allah and stop to remain His servant. You should remember that this faltering disposition of yours can't deflect those incidents and misfortunes which Allah has appointed for you."

As respects the genuine devotees, they have been tended to in two different ways: (1) in a general route to incorporate the average folks of Arabia additionally, and (2) in an exclusive way:

1. The Adherents have been informed that the mushriks of Makkah reserved no option to suspend them from visiting the Holy Mosque. They reserved no privilege to keep anybody from performing Hajj because the Holy Mosque was not their personal property. This complaint was advocated as well as went about as a powerful political weapon against the Quraish. For it suggested this conversation starter to different clans of Arabia: Were the Quraish insignificant orderlies of the Blessed Mosque or its proprietors? It suggested that if they prevailing with regards to suspending the Muslims from Hajj with no dissent from others, they would feel urged in the future to suspend from Hajj and Umrah the individuals of whatever other clan or faction, who had stressed relations with the Quraish. To underscore this point, the historical backdrop of the construction of the Sacred Mosque has been referred to show that it was worked by Prophet Abraham by the Order of Allah and he had welcomed all the people groups to perform Hajj there. That is the reason those originating from outside had delighted in equivalent rights by the neighborhood individuals from the earliest starting point. It has likewise been clarified that that House had not been worked for the ceremonies of shirk but for the love of One Allah. Hence it was sheer oppression that the worship of Allah was being prohibited there while the worship of idols appreciated full permit.
2. To tackle the oppression of the Quraish, the Muslims were permitted to battle with them. They were likewise provided with instruction to adopt the right and just behavior as and when they procured capacity to lead in the land. Additionally, the Adherents have been formally given the name of "Muslims", saying, "You are the genuine heirs of Abraham and you have been chosen to become witnesses of Truth before humankind. In this way, you ought to establish salat and pay the zakat obligations to turn into the best models of equitable life and perform Jihad for spreading the word of Allah."

== Principal subject ==
The significant issues, divine laws, and guidance direction in the text of the discourse can be categorized as follows:

1. A scene from the Hour of Fate.
2. Human life cycle: life right now and then in the Hereafter.
3. The conduct of those people who were remaining at the border of faith is recognized.
4. The way that Allah consistently helps His Rasools.
5. Divine law conceding equivalent rights to all believers in Masjid-al-Haram, regardless of whether they are locals or outsiders.
6. The way that Allah Himself distinguished the site and asked Prophet Ibrahim to manufacture the Kaaba and call humanity to perform Hajj.
7. Somebody who commits Shirk resembles the one who tumbles from the sky and his body is grabbed away by the birds.
8. It isn't the blood or the tissue of a sacrificed animal that arrives Allah yet the devotion of the person who is offering the sacrifice.
9. The 1st Instruction of Allah allowing consent to the devotees to shield themselves and battle against the disbelievers and mushrikin.
10. Upon the arrival of Judgment, Allah Himself will be the Adjudicator for all.
11. Allah's guarantee to the individuals who relocate for the sake of Allah that He will compensate them generously.
12. Allah called the devotees Muslims in the earlier sacred writings and in the Qur'an as well.

== See also ==
- History of the Hajj
- Shahid (martyr) citing 22:58-59
