= Fussilat =

41st chapter of the Qur'an

Surah 41 of the Quran
فصلت Fuṣṣilat Explained in Detail
- Qira'ah; English text
- Classification: Meccan
- Alternate titles (Ar.): Sūrat Ḥā Mīm as-Sajda (سورة ﺣﻢ ﺍﻟﺴﺠﺪﺓ)
- Other names: Revelations Well Expounded, Detailed, Distinguished, Clearly Spelled Out
- Position: Juzʼ 24 to 25
- No. of verses: 54
- No. of Rukus: 6
- No. of Sajdahs: 1
- No. of words: 898
- No. of letters: 3325

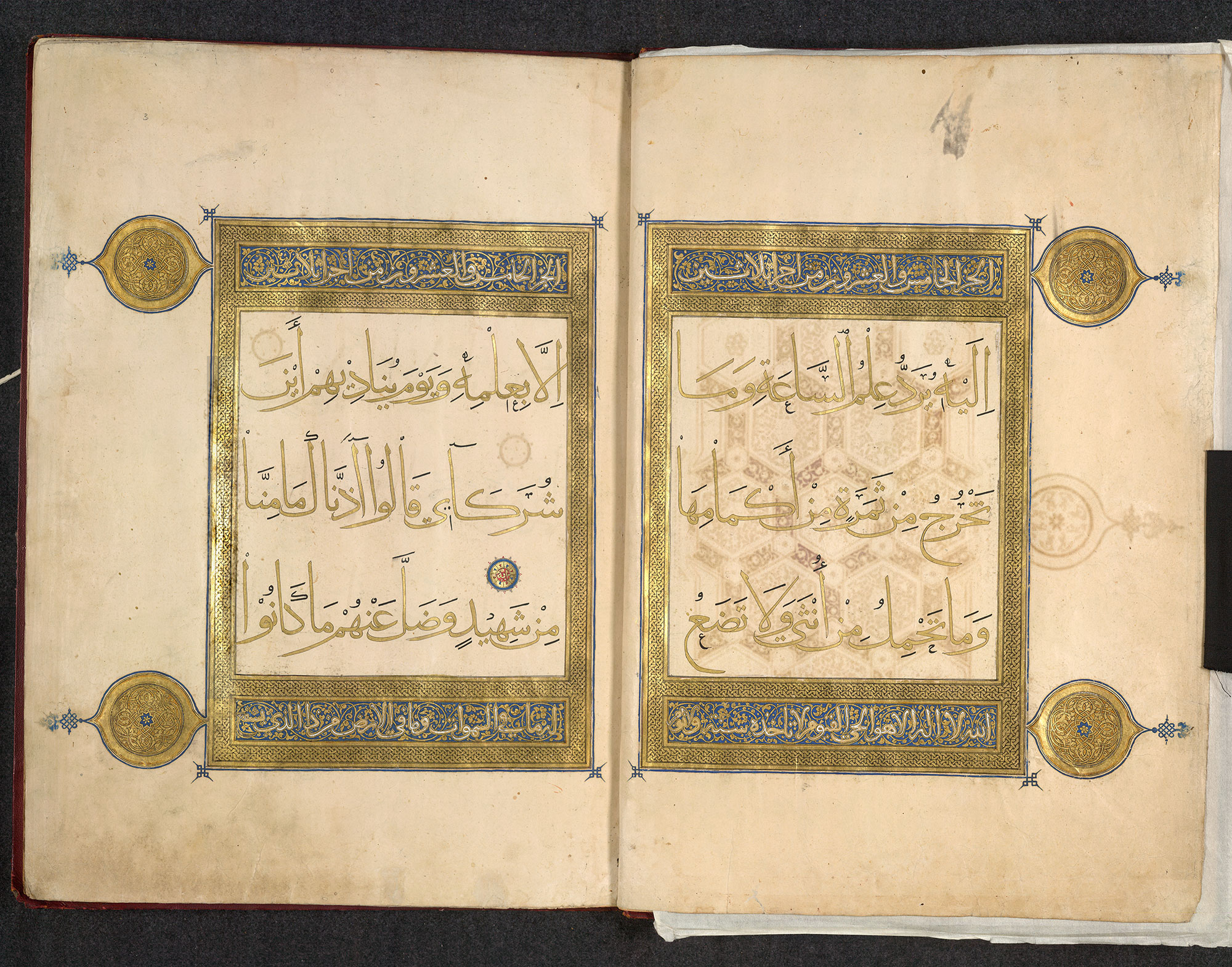
First pages from a 25 Juz' of the Qur'an commissioned by Sultan Uljaytu with verse 46 of chapter Fussilat in muhaqqaq. Mosul, 1310/1311 (710 AH). British Library

Fuṣṣilat (Arabic: فصلت, fuṣṣilat "are distinctly explained" or "explained in detail"), also known as Sūrat Ḥā Mīm as-Sajdah (Arabic: سورة ﺣﻢ ﺍﻟﺴﺠﺪﺓ), is the 41st chapter (surah) of the Qur'an with 54 verses (āyāt).

Regarding the timing and contextual background of the revelation (asbāb al-nuzūl), it is traditionally believed to be a Meccan surah, from the second Meccan period (615-619).

== Summary ==
- 1-3 The Quran declared to be given by inspiration
- 4-5 The people generally reject it
- 6 Muhammad only a man, yet a prophet
- 7 The woe of the wicked and the blessedness of the righteous
- 8-11 God’s power manifested in the creation of earth and heaven
- 12-16 The Quraysh are threatened with the fate of Ád and Thamud
- 17 Believers among the Ádites and Thamúdites were saved
- 18-22 In the judgment the unbelievers shall be condemned by the members of their own bodies
- 23-24 The fate of Jahannam to befall the infidels
- 25-28 Unbelievers counsel blasphemous levity—their punishment
- 29 False teachers to be trodden under foot by their own followers in hell
- 30-32 The glorious rewards of the faithful
- 33 The consistent Muslim commended
- 34-35 Evil to be turned away by good
- 36 God the refuge of the Prophet against Satan’s suggestions
- 37 ۩ 39 God’s works testify to himself as alone worthy of worship
- 40 Unbelievers shall not escape in the resurrection
- 41-42 The Quran a revelation of God
- 43 The infidels offer no new objections to Muhammad and the Qurán
- 44 Why the Quran was revealed in the Arabic language
- 45 The books of Moses at first rejected by his people
- 46 God rewardeth according to works
- 47 The hour of the judgment known only to God
- 47-48 The false gods will desert their worshippers in the judgment
- 49-51 The perfidy of hypocrites
- 52-54 Rejecters of God’s Word exposed to awful punishment

== Q41:12 Revelation ==
Regarding revelation in Islam (Waḥy), the word awha (أوحى awḥá) occurs in a number of shades of meaning in the Quran, each of them indicating the main underlying idea of directing or guiding someone or something. For example, "And inspired in each heaven its command" (Fussilat-12). Translator Sam Gerrans notes that the use of waḥī and awḥā throughout the Quran contains an element of the imperative, and thus translates: "And instructed each heaven in its command".
