= Q41 =

Q41 may refer to:

- Q41 (New York City bus)
- Al-Rahmani, a corvette of the Royal Navy of Oman
- Fussilat, the 41st surah of the Quran
