= Al-Furqan =

25th chapter of the Qur'an

Surah 25 of the Quran
اَلْفُرْقَانْ Al-Furqān The one who distinguishes between falsehood and truth
- Qira'ah; English text
- Classification: Meccan
- Other names: The Statute Book
- Position: Juzʼ 18 to 19
- No. of verses: 77
- No. of Rukus: 6

Al-Furqan (Arabic: اَلْفُرْقَانْ, al-furqān; meaning: The Criterion) is the 25th chapter (sūrah) of the Qur'an, with 77 verses (āyāt). The name Al-Furqan, or "The Criterion", refers to the Qur'an itself as the decisive factor between good and evil. This Surah is named Al-Furqan from the 4th word in the 1st ayat. (Note: In spite of the fact that it is a symbolic name like numerous other Surahs, it has a close connection to its topic.)

The chapter emphasizes (verses 68–70) that there is no sin, however great, that cannot be forgiven if sincerely repented, showing faith and working with righteous deeds.

Al-Furqan refers to the Torah within the contents of the surah, saying "We sent Moses the Book, and appointed his brother Aaron with him as minister" (Sura 25, verse 35), but it does not address the Torah as al-Furqan itself. However, the Torah is addressed as al-Furqan in 21:48 and 2:53.

== Summary ==
- 1 God is praised for the Quran
- 2 The one God as sovereign Creator and Ruler
- 3-4 The idolaters worship gods that are helpless
- 5-6 The Quran said to be Muhammad's own forgery
- 7 Muhammad protests that the Quran is from God
- 8-9 Unbelievers reject Muhammad because he is like other men
- 9 Muhammad said to be a madman
- 10 God comforts Muhammad on account of these calumnies
- 11-16 Unbelievers doomed to hell-fire
- 16-17 The reward of the pious in Paradise
- 18-21 Even the false gods will desert their worshippers in the judgment-day
- 22 The former prophets were all like Muhammad
- 23 The blasphemous unbelief of the Quraish
- 24-25 They shall be punished and their works demolished
- 26-32 Relative condition of the faithful and the unbelievers in the resurrection
- 33 Former prophets had their enemies among unbelievers
- 34-36 The Quran sent down by piecemeal a stumbling-stone to infidels, but a comfort to believers
- 37-38 Those who accused Moses and Aaron of imposture were destroyed
- 39 Noah's calumniators drowned
- 40-42 Adites, Thamúdites, and Sodomites destroyed for infidelity
- 43-45 The Quraish warned in vain by these examples
- 46-52 God's works testify to his being
- 53 God could have sent a preacher to every city
- 54 Muhammad not to obey the will of infidels
- 55-56 God the Creator and Ruler of all things
- 57 Unbelievers worship idols and assist Satan
- 58 Muhammad sent to be a preacher and a warner
- 59 Muhammad only desires the conversion of his people
- ۩ 60 He is exhorted to trust the merciful Creator and Ruler of heaven and earth
- 61 The infidels refuse to worship the God of Muhammad
- 62-63 God praised for his benevolent works
- 64-68 The servants of God described
- 69-71 Wicked men saved by repentance and good works
- 72-74 True penitents described
- 75-76 Their reward in Paradise
- 77 God reprobates the Quraish

== Analysis ==
The Surah manages the questions and doubts that were being raised against the Quran, the Prophethood of Muhammad, and his lessons by the disbelievers of Mecca. Suitable responses to every single objection are revealed in the surah and the individuals have been cautioned of the results of dismissing the Truth. The significant issues, divine laws, and directly follows the following order in the surah:

1. The Quran is the rule, the criterion i.e. Al-Furqan to distinguish between the right and the wrong.
2. Transgressors are the individuals who dismiss Reality, distrust the Rasool, and preclude the Day of Judgment and hereafter.
3. Upon the arrival of Judgment Day, those False-deities worshiped by the mushriks will declare no divinity and consider the mushrik is answerable for their shirk, on the Judgement Day.
4. The disbelievers will lament not opting for the Righteous Path upon the arrival of Judgment Day.
5. Sequential, gradual, and bit-by-bit disclosure of the Quran is a pearl of wisdom.
6. Allah's decree is commanded to make Jihad against unbelief in the Quran.
7. Qualities of genuine devotees are portrayed.

Toward the finish of the Surah, a description of the character of a true believer is given at the start of Surah Al-Mu'minoon. According to Abul A'la Maududi

Here is the criterion for distinguishing the genuine from the counterfeit. This is the noble character of those people who have believed in and followed the teachings of the Holy Prophet and this is the kind of people that he is trying to train. You may yourselves compare and contrast this type of people with those Arabs, who have not as yet accepted the Message, and who are upholding "ignorance" and exerting their utmost to defeat the Truth. Now you may judge for yourselves as to which you would like to choose." Though this question was not posed in so many words, it was placed before everyone in Arabia in a tangible shape. It may be noted that during the next few years, the practical answer given to this question by the whole nation, with the exception of a small minority, was that they chose Islam.

== Time of Revelation ==
It shows up from its style and topic that it was additionally uncovered during the third phase of Prophethood at Makkah like Surah Al-Mu'minun. (Note: Abū Jaʿfar Muḥammad ibn Jarīr ibn Yazīd al-Ṭabarī (Ibn Jarir) and Fakhr al-Din al-Razi have referred to a tradition of Al-Dahhak ibn Muzahim that this Surah was uncovered eight years before Surah An-Nisa. This additionally affirms its time of disclosure.)

Parts of Q25:14-27 are preserved in the Ṣan‘ā’1 lower text.

== See also ==
- List of Islamic texts
- Al-Furqan Foundation
