= Ar-Ra'd =

13th chapter of the Qur'an

Surah 13 of the Quran
الرعد Ar-Raʻd The Thunder
- Qira'ah; English text
- Classification: Medinan
- Position: Juzʼ 13
- No. of verses: 43
- No. of Rukus: 6
- No. of Sajdahs: 1 (15th Ayah)
- No. of words: 854
- No. of letters: 3450

Ar-Ra'd (Arabic: الرعد ar-raʻd), or the Thunder, is the 13th chapter (sūrah) of the Qur'an, composed of 43 verses (āyāt). It has the Muqatta'at (Quranic initials) المر (Alif. Lam. Mim. Ra or ALMR).

Verse 15 contains a prostration symbol ۩:

۝ Whatsoever is in heaven and on earth worshipped GOD, voluntarily or of force; and their shadows also, morning and evening. ۩

This sūrah is concerned with the oneness of God, the message, the Day of judgement, and the penalty. The sūrah revolves around an important axis: what is truth is clear through power and stability, and what is falsehood is clear through its weakness. The verses call upon people to not be deceived by the glitter of falsehood because it is inevitably fleeting, while the truth shines throughout the entire universe.

The name of the sūrah is from the word (ar-Ra'd) (the Thunder) in the 13th ayah.

== Summary ==
- 1 The infidels reject the Quran
- 5 The unbelievers deny the resurrection
- 6 Their punishment
- 7 Threatened judgments sure to come to pass
- 8 Unbelievers demand a sign
- 9-12 God is omniscient
- 12 God's purposes are unchangeable
- 13-14 Thunder and lightning indicates the unceasing works of angels who regulate the clouds and rains in their task given by God.
- ۩ 15 Idolaters invoke their gods in vain
- 16 All nature worships the Creator
- 17 The separation of infidels from true believers typified in the flowing stream and the melting metal
- 18-22 True believers described
- 23-24 Their reward
- 25 The end of the infidels
- 26 Abundance of wealth no sign of God's favour
- 27 The infidels demand a sign from heaven
- 28 God directs true believers
- 29 Muhammad sent to an unbelieving people
- 30 Signs unavailing to make infidels true believers
- 31-32 God will punish the unbelievers
- 33-34 Idolaters are reprobate
- 35 Paradise is described
- 36 Certain Jews acknowledge Muhammad to be a prophet
- 36-37 Muhammad exhorted to make no compromise with idolatry
- 38 Wives and children no hindrance to the prophetic office
- 39 God is lord of his own book
- 40 Muhammad is a preacher only
- 41 God's judgments is sure to come to pass
- 42 The plots of God's enemies is not hidden from him
- 43 God attests the claims of his Prophet

== Q13-14 ==
Ibn Taymiyyah in his work, Majmu al-Fatwa al-Kubra, quoted the Marfu Hadith transmitted by Ali ibn abi Thalib, that Ra'd were the name of a group of angels who herded the dark clouds like a shepherd. Ali further narrated that thunder (Ra'dan Arabic: رعدان) is the growling voices of those angels while herding the clouds, while lightning strikes (Sawa'iq Arabic: صوائق) are a device used by those angels in gathering and herding the raining clouds. Al-Suyuti narrated from the Hadith transmitted from Ibn Abbas about the lightning angels, while giving further commentary that hot light produced by lightning (Barq Arabic: برق) was the emitted light produced from a whip device used by those angels. Saudi Grand Mufti Abd al-Aziz Bin Baz also ruled the sunnah practice of reciting Sura Ar-Ra'd, Ayah 13|Quran 13:13 ^{(Translated by Shakir)} whenever a Muslim hears thunder, as this was practiced according to the Hadith tradition narrated by Zubayr ibn al-Awwam.

== Time of Revelation ==
There has been considerable disagreement about the time of revelation among Muslim scholars going back to conflicting reports from the Companions. In his famous tafsir, Turkish scholar Elmalili Hamdi Yazir reviews the different reports and opinions in the introduction of his tafsir of Surah Ar-Ra'd. He quotes a report by Alûsî that Ikrime, Atâ and Hasen said the surah was revealed during the Meccan phase. On the other side, Companion and prominent scholar of the Quran Abdullah bin Abbas along with Kelbî, Mukatil, and Katade said it was revealed in the Medinan phase. He then quotes famous Tafsir scholars Kâdî Baydawî and Ebus-suud as saying it's Madinan, and Fahreddin Râzî as saying it's Meccan.

The rhetoric of the discourse shows that this sūrah was uncovered in the ending of the Meccan phase, when Muhammad was also revealed with the surahs Yunus, Hud, and Al-A'araf. Time had passed since Muhammad last passed on the Message. His adversaries had been carrying out various plots to vanquish him and his mission, while his supporters thought that by indicating some tangible miracle the disbelievers might be brought to the Correct Path. The sūrah responded that the Devotees ought not to lose heart, and that disbelievers would explain away any miracle, even if Allah brought the dead out of their graves and caused them to talk.

== Theme ==
The opening ayah articulates the fundamental topic of this sūrah: "The Message of Muhammad (Allah's tranquility arrive) is the very Truth, however, it is the shortcoming of the individuals that they are dismissing it".

Other than this, the sūrah also addresses the rivals and their complaints, and the Devotees, who had been going through trials and were tiring. The Devotees are told that by standing by restlessly for Allah's help, they have been ameliorated and loaded up with expectation and fortitude. The significant issues, divine Laws, and direction incorporated in the text of the discourse can be categorized as follows:-

1. The Qur'an is the disclosure of Allah.
2. Trees, fruits, and vegetables are among the indications of Allah.
3. Allah never changes the state of a people except if they are eager to change themselves.
4. The individuals who don't react to the call of Allah will have no real way to escape from hellfire.
5. It is the recognition of Allah that gives quietness to hearts.
6. Rasools [Prophets] have no capacity to show any marvel of miracle with the exception of the will of Allah.
