= Al-Alaq =

96th chapter of the Qur'an

Surah 96 of the Quran
العلق Al-ʻAlaq The Clot
- Qira'ah; English text
- Classification: Meccan
- Alternate titles (Ar.): سورة إقرا (Sūrat Iqrā)
- Other names: The Embryo, The Clinging Form, The Clinging-Clot, The Clot, The Germ-Cell, Read
- Position: Juzʼ 30
- No. of verses: 19
- No. of Sajdahs: 1 (Verse 19)

Al-Alaq
Recitation of Al-Alaq in mujawwad.

Al-ʻAlaq (Arabic: العلق, al-ʻalaq, also known as "The Clinging Clot" or "The Embryo") is the 96th chapter (sūrah) of the Quran. It is composed of 19 āyāt or verses. It is sometimes also known as Sūrat Iqrā (سورة إقرا, "Read").

Chapter 96 of the Quran is traditionally believed to have been Muhammad's first revelation. It is said that while Muhammad was on retreat in the Cave of Hira, at Jabal al-Nour near Mecca, the angel Gabriel appeared before him and commanded him to "Read!". He responded, "But I cannot read!". Then the angel Gabriel embraced him tightly and revealed to him the first lines, "Read: In the name of your Lord Who created, (1) Created man from a clot. (2) Read: And your Lord is the Most Generous, (3) Who taught by the pen, (4) Taught man that which he knew not. (5)" (Bukhari 4953). It is traditionally understood the first five ayat or verses (1–5) of Surah Alaq were revealed; however, this is not the first fully complete Surah to be revealed and was actually revealed in 3 parts.

== Summary ==
1-5 Angel Gabriel commanding towards Muhammad to recite the first verses of the Quran.
6-14 Rebuke of Abu Jahl for hindering the Muslim cause.
15 ۩ 19 Abu Jahl threatened with the torments of Hell as punishment.

=== 1-5 The first revelation ===
The first five verses of this sura are believed by some commentators to be the first verses of the Quran claimed to be related by Muhammad. He received them while on a retreat in a mountain cave at Hira, just outside the city of Mecca, in 610 CE. A few commentators disagree with this account, claiming that the first revelation was the beginning of surat al-Muddaththir or surat al-Fatiha, but theirs is a minority position. Moreover, the term إِنْسَان insān, which is translated "man, human", appears 65 times in the Quran, meaning "humanity".

=== 6–19 The morality and beliefs of mankind ===
The remainder of the surah, claimed to have been revealed later, questions the morality and beliefs of humankind, who "thinks himself self-sufficient", unaware that all things will return to their Lord. Once man becomes self-satisfied, he has the tendency to transgress. These ayahs were revealed shortly after Muhammed started to pray publicly, as many people questioned his actions. The text continues, addressing the impiety of "the man who forbids Our servant to pray". These later lines are thought to date from the time when Muhammad began to pray the salat in the Kaaba. Abu Jahl (member of the Quraish) attempted to interrupt the prayer by trampling on Muhammad's neck while he was prostrated. "Does he not realize that God sees all?"

The Quran commands Muhammad (and by inference all believers) to continue the prayer regardless, as those who persecute the faithful are unaware that God sees what they do. After the first 8 ayahs were revealed, Muhammed left the cave at Hira, and then surahs Ad-Duha, Nashra, and the second part of this surah were revealed after 6 months.

More specifically, ayahs 9–14 were revealed when Muhammed first began praying publicly near the Kaaba because the Meccans didn't comprehend what he was doing. These were directed towards people who tried to stop others from making devotions toward Allah. Once Abu Jahl saw Muhammed praying publicly, he thought that Muhammed had adopted a new religion and tried to drive him away from the Kaaba. He gathered a crowd and asked: "Is Muhammed setting his face on the ground in front of you (praying)?" When they replied in affirmative he said: "by the gods Al-Lat and Al-Uzza, if I ever catch him in that act of worship (salah), I will set my foot on his neck and rub his face in the dust." Abu Jahl wanted to follow through on his threat, but when he saw Muhammed he stepped forward, motioned to put his foot on his neck, but then became frightened and left. When asked about it later, he said that he had seen a vision of a ditch right in front of Muhammed, filled with fire and a ghoul with fiery wings. After Muhammed heard about the remark, he said: "if he would have come near me, the angels would have struck him down and torn him into pieces."

Ayahs 15–19 say that when Abu Jahl saw Muhammed pray again near the Kaaba, and said "Didn’t I tell you not to do this!" Muhammad scolded him and said that he had the right to pray here, because he was a born citizen of Mecca. Abu Jahl said "you dare to scold me! By God, with one call I can fill this valley with supporters!" This passage was revealed: "If (Abu Jahl) would have called upon his men, the angel of punishment would have seized him."

The translated words 'bow down' in verse 19 comes from the word 'Sujud' which refers to the position in Muslim prayer where the head, hands, knees, and toes are on the ground.

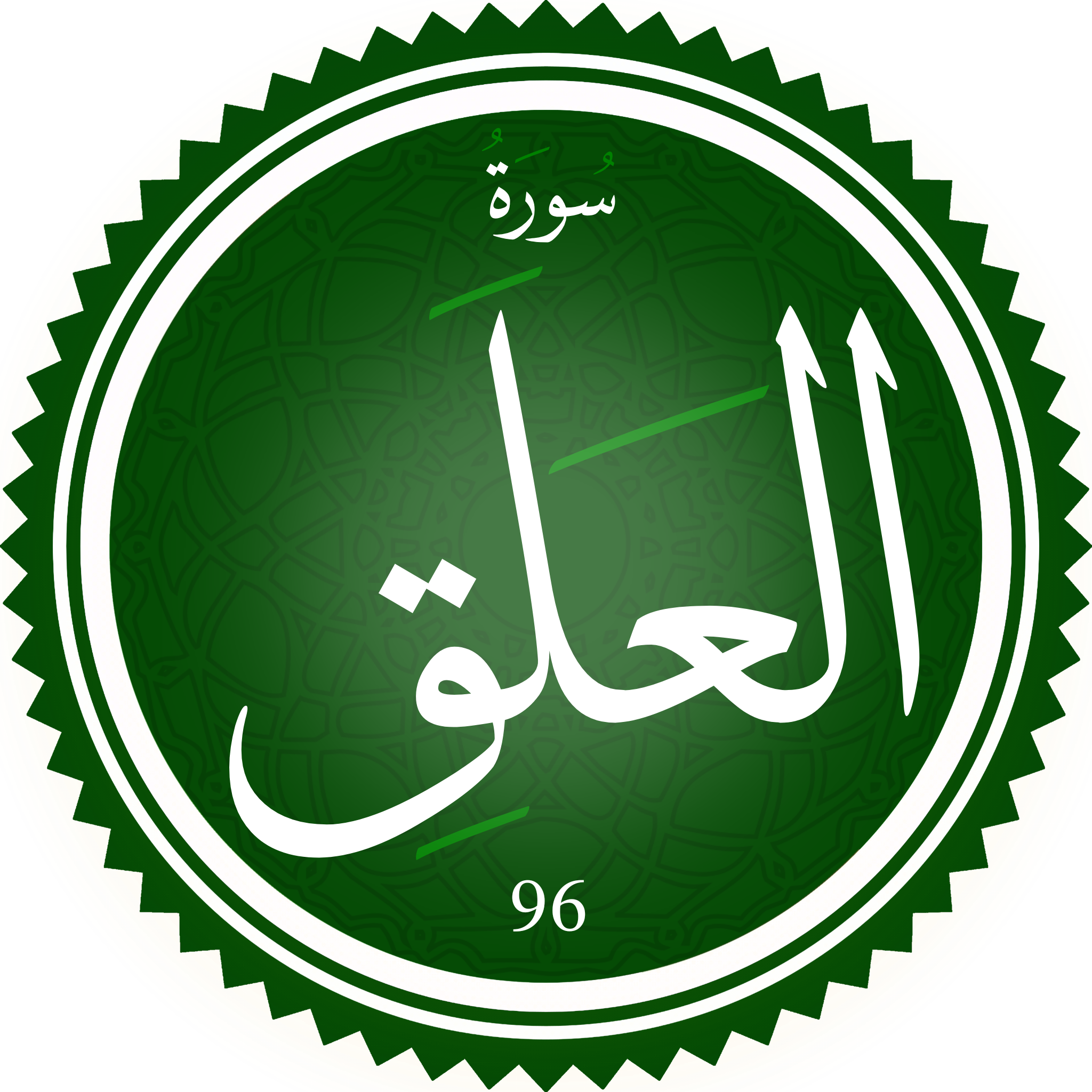
Al-Alaq

== The meaning of 'alaq ==
The linguistic definition of ʻalaq علق (singular ʻalaqah علقة) is "leech", "medicinal leech", "coagulated blood", "blood clot", or "the early stage of the embryo". ʻAlaq is also a derivative of ʻalaqa which means "attached and hanging to something." Professor Abdul Haleem mentions that "ʻalaq" can also mean anything that clings: a clot of blood, a leech, even a lump of mud. All these meanings involve the basic idea of clinging or sticking."

The term ʻalaqah is the second stage of human prenatal development (sura Al-Mu’minoon 23:12–14) which "descriptively encompasses the primary external and internal features" of the early embryo. The term ʻalaqah also occurs in several languages related to Arabic. In Hebrew there is עֲלוּקָה alûqāh (or alukah), the generic name for any blood-sucking worm or leech, and in Aramaic and Syriac there are words with apparently similar meanings.

C. Luxenberg interprets the word as denoting "stickiness," suggesting that it refers to the "sticky clay" mentioned in classical creation stories.

== Hadith ==
The first and foremost exegesis/tafsir of the Quran is found in hadith of Muhammad. Although scholars including ibn Taymiyyah claim that Muhammad has commented on the whole of the Quran, others including Ghazali cite the limited amount of narratives, thus indicating that he has commented only on a portion of the Quran. Ḥadīth (حديث) is literally "speech" or "report", that is a recorded saying or tradition of Muhammad validated by isnad; with Sirah Rasul Allah these comprise the sunnah and reveal shariah. According to Aishah, the life of Muhammad was the practical implementation of Quran. Therefore, higher count of hadith elevates the importance of the pertinent surah from a certain perspective. According to hadith, first 5 ayaat of this surah were first revelation of whole of the Quran.

- Narrated Yahya: I asked Aba Salama, "Which Sura of the Qur'an was revealed first?" He replied, "O you, wrapped-up' (Al-Muddaththir)." I said, "I have been informed that it was, 'Read, in the Name of your Lord who created (i.e. Surat Al-Alaq)
- Abu Huraira reported: We performed prostration along with the Messenger of Allah (ﷺ) (as he recited these verses: )" When the heaven burst asunder" (Al-Inshiqaq) and" Read in the name of Thy Lord (Al-Alaq)"

1–3: These verses are talking about how God created human beings from Alaq (The Clot of blood or The Clinging Thing). After this verse was revealed, Muhammed responded by saying that he didn't know how to read. After angel Jibraeel squeezed Muhammed's chest a few times, and the 3rd verse was revealed, Muhammed read even though he did not know how to read or write.

4–5: These verse stress the importance of an education for a Muslim. As time goes on, things progress and advance, and everything comes from God. God opens peoples brains to new things, and this verse stresses the importance of furthering your education. This hadeeth in relation to this ayah was revealed which says: "a person who reads is handsome in the eyes of God."

6–8: Even though God does so many things for us we still disobey him. Some people say that they do not need Allah. It does not matter because everyone will return to him on the Day of Judgement for reckoning.

9–10: In this verse "the one who discourages" references Abu Jahl when he tried to stop Muhammed from making devotions towards Allah, and anyone else for that matter.

11–14: These verses question whether the "one who discourages" is being "guided" or even "concerned" about God. They also emphasize that if someone is praying not to stop them because Allah is always watching.

15–19: These verse explain why the person who interrupts someone in prayer is said that they will be dragged from their "lying, sinful, forelock." This phrase comes from Abu Jahl, who in the battle of Badr was killed by the hands of 2 child orphans of Medinah. His body was thrown into a well and they dragged him by his hair, which is specifically in reference to verse 15.

=== Period of revelation ===
This sura has two parts: the first consists of vv. 1–5, and the second of vv. 6–19. The majority of Islamic scholars agreed that the first part forms the first revelation to be sent down to Muhammad in 610. In this regard, the Hadith from Aisha, which Ibn Hanbal, Bukhari, Muslim and other traditionists have related with several chains of authorities, is one of the most authentic Hadith on the subject. In it Aisha narrates the full story of the beginning of revelation as she herself heard it from Muhammad. Besides, Ibn Abbas, Abu Musa al-Ashari and a group of the Companions also are reported to have stated that these were the very first verses of the Quran to be revealed to Muhammad.

The second part was revealed later, when Muhammad began to perform the prescribed prayer in the precincts of the Kaaba, and Abu Jahl tried to prevent him from this with threats.
