= Meccan surah =

Quran surahs composed in Mecca

A Meccan surah (Arabic: سورة مكية, romanized: Surah Makkiyah) is, according to the timing and contextual background of their revelation (asbāb al-nuzūl) within Islamic tradition, a chronologically earlier chapter (suwar, singular sūrah) of the Qur'an. Thus, the Koran places surahs from longest to shortest, not from earliest to latest. The traditional chronological order attributed to Ibn Abbas became widely accepted following its adoption by the 1924 Egyptian standard edition. The Meccan chapters are believed to have been revealed anytime before the migration of the Islamic prophet Muhammad and his followers from Mecca to Medina (Hijra). The Medinan surahs are those revelations which occurred after the move. There are 86 Meccan surahs. The Meccan phase of surahs is thought to be around 13 years in length.

Meccan surahs are typically shorter than Medinan surahs, with relatively short verses (āyāt), and mostly come near the end of the Qur'an. (As a general rule, the chapters of the Qur'an are ordered from longest to shortest.) Most of the chapters containing Muqatta'at are Meccan, (Note: Although the verses actually containing the disjointed letters may not be meccan themselves, such as in the 12th chapter.) Except 2, 3 and 13.

The chapters are divided into "Meccan" and "Medinan" sections mostly due to stylistic and thematic factors. Classification of the chapters into these periods is based upon factors such as the length of the verse and the presence or absence of certain key concepts or words (e.g., al-Rahman as the name of God).

== Characteristics of Meccan surahs ==
Following are some characteristics of Meccan verses, n.º 7 and 8 are stylistic characteristics, and the last four are content and subject characteristics:

1. Any chapter that has a verse that commands to prostrate to Allah (آيات السجدة) is Meccan, except chapters 13 and 22.
2. Any chapter that contains the word kalla كلا (never) is Meccan, and are found only in the second half of the Qur'an.
3. Any chapter that has the phrase (يأيها الناس, O individual), but does not have the phrase (يأيها اللذين آمنوا, O you who believe) is Meccan except chapter 22.
4. Any chapter that start with initial letters muqattaat are Meccan, except chapters 2, 3 and 13.
5. Any chapter that relates the story of Adam and Iblis (i.e., Satan) is Meccan, except chapter 2.
6. Any chapter that relates the stories of previous prophets and their people is Meccan, except chapter 2.
7. Short verses, and strong rhetorical style and rhythmic sound.
8. Repeated use of emphasis, exhortation, analogies and oath.
9. Emphasis on the belief in Allah, the Day of Judgement and description of Hell and Heaven (paradise), except chapter 2.
10. Call for adherence to good moral and universal characters like truthfulness, kindness to relatives, old and neighbour, etc.
11. Argument with the polytheists and refutation of their associating partners with Allah.
12. Warning the polytheists through stories of previous messengers when punishment came to their people when they rejected their message.

== Chronological order of Meccan surahs ==
One chronological order proposed by Abu al-Qasim `Umar ibn Muhammad ibn `Abd al-Kafi and considered the "traditional order" consists of 86 chapters, as follows:

96, 68, 73, 74, 1, 111, 81, 87, 92, 89,
93, 94, 103, 100, 108, 102, 107, 109, 105, 113,
114, 112, 53, 80, 97, 91, 85, 95, 106, 101,
75, 104, 77, 50, 90, 86, 54, 38, 7, 72,
36, 25, 35, 19, 20, 56, 26, 27, 28, 17,
10, 11, 12, 15, 6, 37, 31, 34, 39, 40,
41, 42, 43, 44, 45, 46, 51, 88, 18, 16,
71, 14, 21, 23, 32, 52, 67, 69, 70, 78,
79, 82, 84, 30, 29, 83.

Theodor Nöldeke proposed a different chronological order, later known as the Nöldeke-Schwally chronology, consisting of 90 chapters, as follows:

- from the first to the fifth year of Mohammed's mission:

96, 74, 111, 106, 108, 104, 107, 102, 105, 92,
90, 94, 93, 97, 86, 91, 80, 68, 87, 95,
103, 85, 73, 101, 99, 82, 81, 53, 84, 100,
79, 77, 78, 88, 89, 75, 83, 69, 51, 52,
56, 70, 112, 109, 113, 114, 1;

- the fifth and sixth year of his mission:

54, 37, 71, 76, 44, 50, 20, 26, 15, 19,
38, 36, 43, 72, 67, 23, 21, 25, 17, 27, 18;

- from the seventh year to Hijra:

32, 41, 45, 16, 30, 11, 14, 12, 40, 28,
39, 29, 31, 42, 10, 34, 35, 7, 46, 6.

== First Meccan surahs ==
The First Meccan period refers to the first period in which Muhammad started receiving revelations. The First Meccan surahs are chapters that have been revealed throughout that period. They reflect the public setting in which they seem to have been shared and due to their structure and length, they seem to be presented in a manner that would be very easy to memorize and pass along orally, not to mention that many of the surahs seem to be used during early liturgies. They are relatively shorter than other chapters in the Quran but are more diverse in terms of structure. Compared to other later surahs, the surahs of the First Meccan Period employ more rhymes despite their shorter length. They rank from being very short, a paragraph of less than five verses (for example surah 97, 103, 105, 108 and 111) to being organized in clusters of two (surahs 81, 91), three (surahs 82, 84, 86, 90, 92) or four verses (surahs 85, 89). Some of these surahs also take on a balanced tripartite structure that begin and conclude with. The major theme of these surahs revolves around presenting to humanity how obvious the existence of God is through the use of oath formulas involving the power of nature in an emphatic tone. We especially see the surahs reference destroyed civilizations, declaring their destruction to be the will of God. A stress is put on God being the creator of Earth and Heaven and everything that lies in between and also His unreachable generosity. In addition, certain surahs generally talk about ethics and values human beings should have, especially the fact that human beings should be humbled by God's power, they should not pursue an extravagant life, be loving and sharing, most particularly with the poorer. Last but not least these surahs contain eschatological prophecies. Although not elaborated as in later surahs, these prophecies appear with a threatening tone to make people generally know about the existence of the Day of Judgement and all that it encompasses (surah 103, 68, etc.), but also, they contain some of the more visual explanations of Heaven.

== Second Meccan surahs ==
There are 21 surahs in the second Meccan period. These surahs have, on average, ayah between twelve and twenty syllables in length. Some surahs have fewer than fifty ayah, while others, such as surah 20, "Ta-Ha", have well over 100 verses. These surahs do not necessarily have distinct features, as the surahs of the first and third Meccan periods do, but instead display a blend of features from both earlier and later Meccan surahs. These middle surahs keep and expand upon the tripartite structure of the verse. According to Ernst, surahs that adhere to this structure (common in pre-Islamic Arab poetry) will have shorter first and third sections that parallel each other in scope and audience. The third section will "normally conclude with a flourish." These parts bookend a somewhat larger middle section, which is "typically a narrative of prophecy and struggle". These surahs also tend to use fewer oaths than earlier Meccan surahs, but take a much more confrontational approach in regards to the disbelievers. Some surahs in this period adopt a form resembling a monotheistic service, as is often seen in later Meccan surahs. For example, surah 20 begins with a section proclaiming the greatness of God, and then transitions immediately into a story about Moses. After the lengthy story concludes, several verses are devoted to explaining the meaning of the story, especially as it relates to the disbelievers. Due to the presence of elements from earlier and later Meccan surahs, surahs of the middle Meccan period exemplify the gradual development of the Qur'anic revelations over time, as Muhammad's community slowly grew and changed. This is manifest in the fact that surahs of the second Meccan period tend toward self-referentiality, wherein the Qur'an uses "qur'an" (recitation or the Qu'ran) and "kitaab" (book) to make mention to its own existence (surahs 54, 37, 15, et al.), noting that indeed there is a holy message coming from God. Controversy from these verses have sprung up, wherein the question of the Word's existence is debated. Some believe that the Qur'an existed/exists for all time with God, while others believe that the Qur'an was simply the Word for the Arab peoples of Muhammad from his prophecy onward.

== Third Meccan surahs ==
This period is marked from the beginning of Muhammad's public ministry to the Hijra, or the Abyssinian emigration. According to the Yusuf Ali translation, the Third Meccan period refers to the time period from the seventh year to the Hijra, approximately 619–622 A.D. This period is characterized by the persecution of Muhammad and the Muslims by the Quraysh as it expanded to his clan, the Hashem. To persuade the clan to relent their protection of Muhammad, the Quraysh boycotted the Hashem. Revelations from this period are characterized by descriptions of the resurrection, paradise, and Judgment Day. In this period, the tripartite structure is abandoned for a longer and less complex structure, showing a form of collection that still remains a mystery to scholars. They contain mostly long addresses to the community of the believers (much larger by this time). Also, Muhammad begins to be addressed directly by God instead of being used as merely the medium by which God's message is transmitted.

Surahs of this period show the ways in which believers should act even when they face opposition and difficulties.

By the third Meccan period, sensuous imagery of full-bosomed, wide-eyed, and virginal maidens has been replaced by references to spouses. N78/E6o of the Third Meccan Period: 'whoever of their fathers, their spouses and offspring have acted honourably'. By the Third Meccan period, Muhammad and the Muslims had gained sufficient support. In the early Meccan periods, these sensuous descriptions and temptations of voluptuous virgins were used to attract the attention of the Meccan pagans. However, by the Third Meccan period, goals had been realigned not to attract pagans but to encourage and foster a law-abiding community centered around worshipping the Word of God.

In a complete reconstruction of the verses' chronology has been discussed.

== See also ==
- Medinan surah
- List of chapters in the Quran
