= Qāṣṣ =

In early Islam, a qāṣṣ (plural quṣṣāṣ) (Note: Also transliterated ḳāṣṣ (ḳuṣṣāṣ)) was a preacher or "sermoniser" who told stories ostensibly to edify the faithful. The term comes from the Arabic verb qaṣṣa, meaning "to recount". The qāṣṣ was essentially a popular storyteller and the reputation among Islamic scholars of the early quṣṣāṣ has generally been that of "second-rate religious figures lingering on the fringes of Islamic orthodoxy and even, at times, contributing directly to the corruption of the faith". In actuality, the quṣṣāṣ varied on a spectrum from serious Qurʾānic exegetes to outright charlatans.

According to al-Maqrīzī, writing in the fifteenth century, there was a distinction between the private qāṣṣ and the official qāṣṣ. The office was instituted by the Caliph Muʿāwiya I. So far the only traces found of these official quṣṣāṣ come from Egypt. There the office was typically held by a qāḍī (judge). His job was to denounce the enemies of Islam after the morning prayer each day and to explain the Qurʾān after the khuṭba on Fridays. The official qāṣṣ was replaced in the tenth century by the wāʿiẓ and the mudhakkir.
