= Sujud Tilawa =

Prostration during recitation of the Quran

The Sujud Tilawa (Arabic: سجود التلاوة, lit. 'prostration [of] recitation') is an act of Islamic worship involving prostration (sujud) immediately after the reading of specific verses of the Quran. This can occur either during any of the five daily prayers or during ordinary reading of the Quran.

== Presentation ==
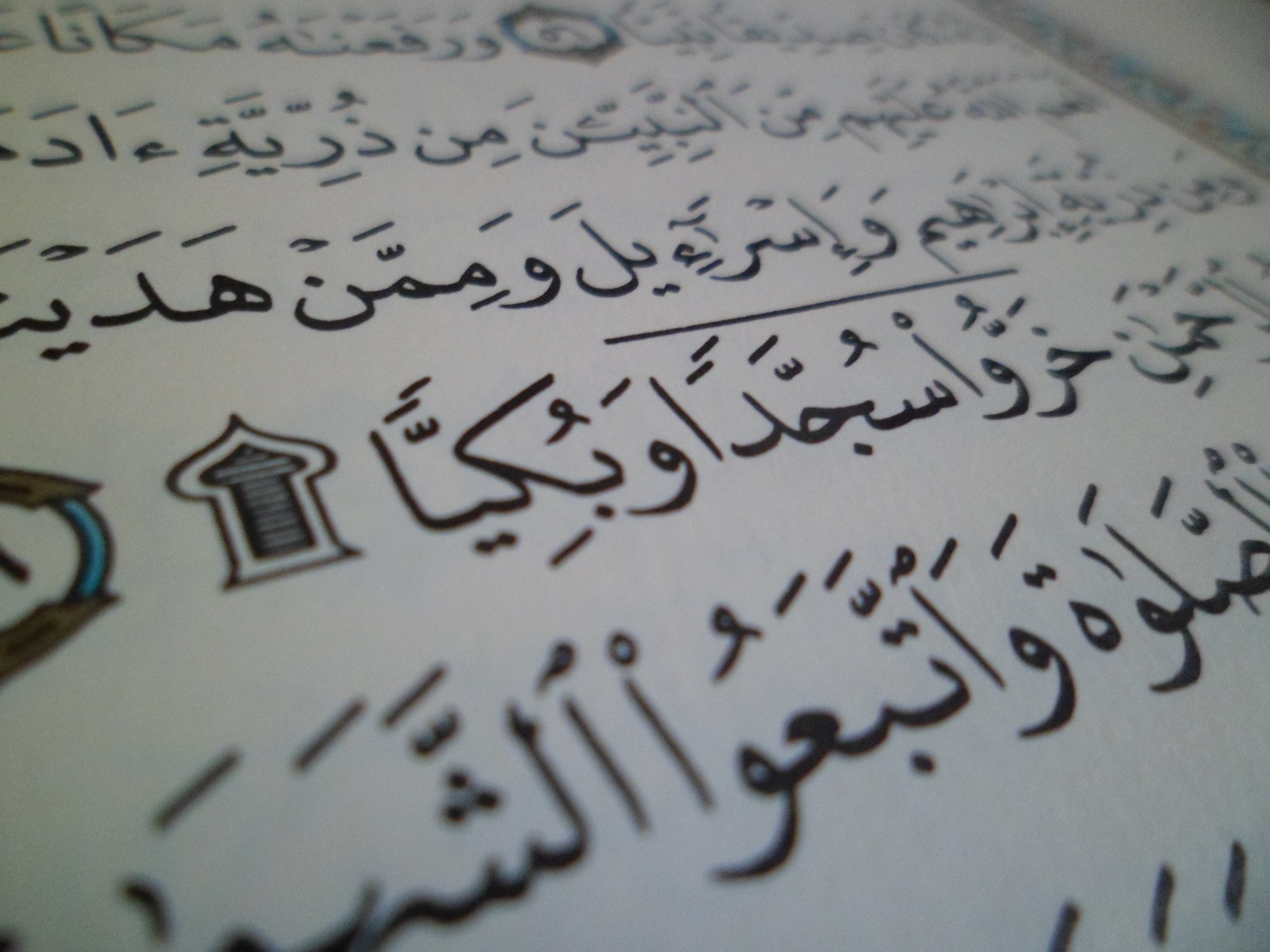
۩ Āyah 58, in Surah Maryam.

Defining the prostration of recitation (tilawa) as a movement of prostration resulting from the reason that it is a mustahabb when the recitation reaches one of the verses of prostration.

This Sujud occurs during the Tilawa recitation of the Quran, including Salah prayers in Salah al jama'ah.

Muslim jurists agree on the legitimacy of the prostration of recitation and that is ''mustahabb''.

There are fifteen places where Muslims believe that when Muhammad recited a certain verse (ayah) he prostrated to God.

== Religious legality ==
Shafi'i and Hanbali jurists are of the view that the prostration of recitation is a Confirmed Sunnah after reciting a verse of the verses of prostration.

And they based their opinion on Āyah: 107 of Surat Al-Isra, in which God (Allah) Almighty says:

قُلْ آمِنُوا بِهِ أَوْ لَا تُؤْمِنُوا ۚ إِنَّ الَّذِينَ أُوتُوا الْعِلْمَ مِنْ قَبْلِهِ إِذَا يُتْلَىٰ عَلَيْهِمْ يَ̅خِ̅رُّ̅و̅نَ̅ لِ̅لْ̅أَ̅ذْ̅قَ̅ا̅نِ̅ سُ̅جَّ̅دً̅ا̅

English: Say, ‘Whether you believe in it, or do not believe in it, indeed those who were given knowledge before it when it is recited to them, fall down in prostration on their faces.
(Quran: 17:107)

A prophetic hadith was also narrated from the companion Abu Hurairah, may God Almighty be pleased with him, in which he said:

Arabic hadith	English translation
Arabic: قَالَ رَسُولُ اللَهِ -صَلَّى اللَهُ عَلَيْهِ وَسَلَمَ-: « إِذَا قَرَأَ ابْنُ آدَمَ السَّجْدَةَ فَسَجَدَ، اِعْتَزَلَ الشَّيْطَانُ يَبْكِي، يَقُولُ: يَا وَيْلِي، أُمِرَ ابْنُ آدَمَ بِالسُّجُودِ فَسَجَدَ فَلَهُ الْجَنَّةُ، وَأُمِرْتُ بِالسُّجُودِ فَأَبَيْتُ فَلِيَ النَّارُ. » — Hadith	English: The Messenger of God, peace be upon him, said: “If the son of Adam recites the prostration and prostrates himself, Satan retires and cries, saying: O my loss, the son of Adam was commanded to prostrate, and he prostrated, so his reward is paradise; and I was ordered to prostrate, so I refused, and my penalty is the fire.“ — Hadith

Another hadith was also narrated by the companion Abdullah ibn Umar in which he said:

Arabic hadith	English translation
Arabic: كَانَ رَسُولُ اللَهِ -صَلَّى اللَهُ عَلَيْهِ وَسَلَّمَ- يَقْرَأُ عَلَيْنَا السُّورَةَ فِيهَا السَّجْدَةُ، فَيَسْجُدُ، وَنَسْجُدُ. — Hadith	English: “The Messenger of God, peace be upon him, used to recite to us the surah in which the verse of prostration was written, so he would prostrate while we would prostrate with him.” — Hadith

Shafi'i and Hanbali jurists do not consider the prostration of recitation as a duty for them, relying on the fact that Muhammad left it when he recited Surah An-Najm which included a verse of prostration, and he did not prostrate.

This was confirmed by the hadith that was narrated by the companion Zayd ibn Thabit, may God Almighty be pleased with him, in which he said:

Arabic hadith	English translation
Arabic: روى زيد بن ثابت رضي الله تعالى عنه قال: "قرأت على النبي صلى الله عليه وسلم والنجم فلم يسجد فيها"، وفي رواية: "فلم يسجد منا أحد". — Hadith	English: “I read Surah An-Najm to the Prophet, may God bless him and grant him peace, and he did not prostrate in it, and in another narration: “No one of us would prostrate.” — Hadith

== Conditions ==
Muslim in prostration.

The Muslim jurists stated that the prostration of Quran recitation is required the same conditions as for Salah prayer, like ritual purity, ghusl and wudu or tayammum, facing the direction of qibla, wearing clothes that cover the intimate parts of the body, and avoiding najassa and impurity.

Few jurists also stated that a Muslim who had lost his two purity, meaning ghusl and wudu, should not prostrate in Quran recitation.

If the Maliki jurists had a reputation for saying that it is permissible to prostrate in recitation even if the Muslim lacked a major and minor purity on the basis of the Maliki school of thought, there are some Malikis who chose not to lack that purity, according to two jurisprudential sayings.

In order for the prostration of recitation to be valid, the time for prostration must begin, and this happens according to the majority of jurists by reading or hearing all of the verse of the prostration; If the reciter (qari) prostrates before the end of the verse of prostration, if with one letter, he is not permitted to do that.

The validity of the prostration of recitation requires that the entire verse of prostration be heard, it is not sufficient for the one who is prostrating to hear only the word of prostration on its own.

The listener who wants to prostrate is also required to refrain from corrupting things such as eating, speech and actions that are outside of reverence.

== Supplication ==
Imam Al-Ghazali said that the one who is prostrating in recitation must make supplication (dua) in his prostration in a manner befitting the context and meaning of the verse of prostration he read, and it is also permissible for him to utter tasbih and various dua.

Imam Abu Dawood narrated in his book Sunan Abu Dawood a hadith on the authority of Muhammad's wife Aisha bint Abi Bakr, in which she said:

Arabic hadith	English translation
Arabic: كَانَ رَسُولُ اللَهِ -صَلَّى اللَهُ عَلَيْهِ وَسَلَّمَ- يَقُولُ فِي سُجُودِ الْقُرْآنِ بِاللَّيْلِ: « سَجَدَ وَجْهِي لِلَّذِي خَلَقَهُ، وَشَقَّ سَمْعَهُ وَبَصَرَهُ، بِحَوْلِهِ وَقُوَّتِهِ » — Hadith	English: The Messenger of God, peace be upon him, used to say in the prostration of the Quran at night: « My face prostrated to the One who created him and models his hearing and sight with his power and strength. » — Hadith

== Fiqh opinions on prostration verses ==
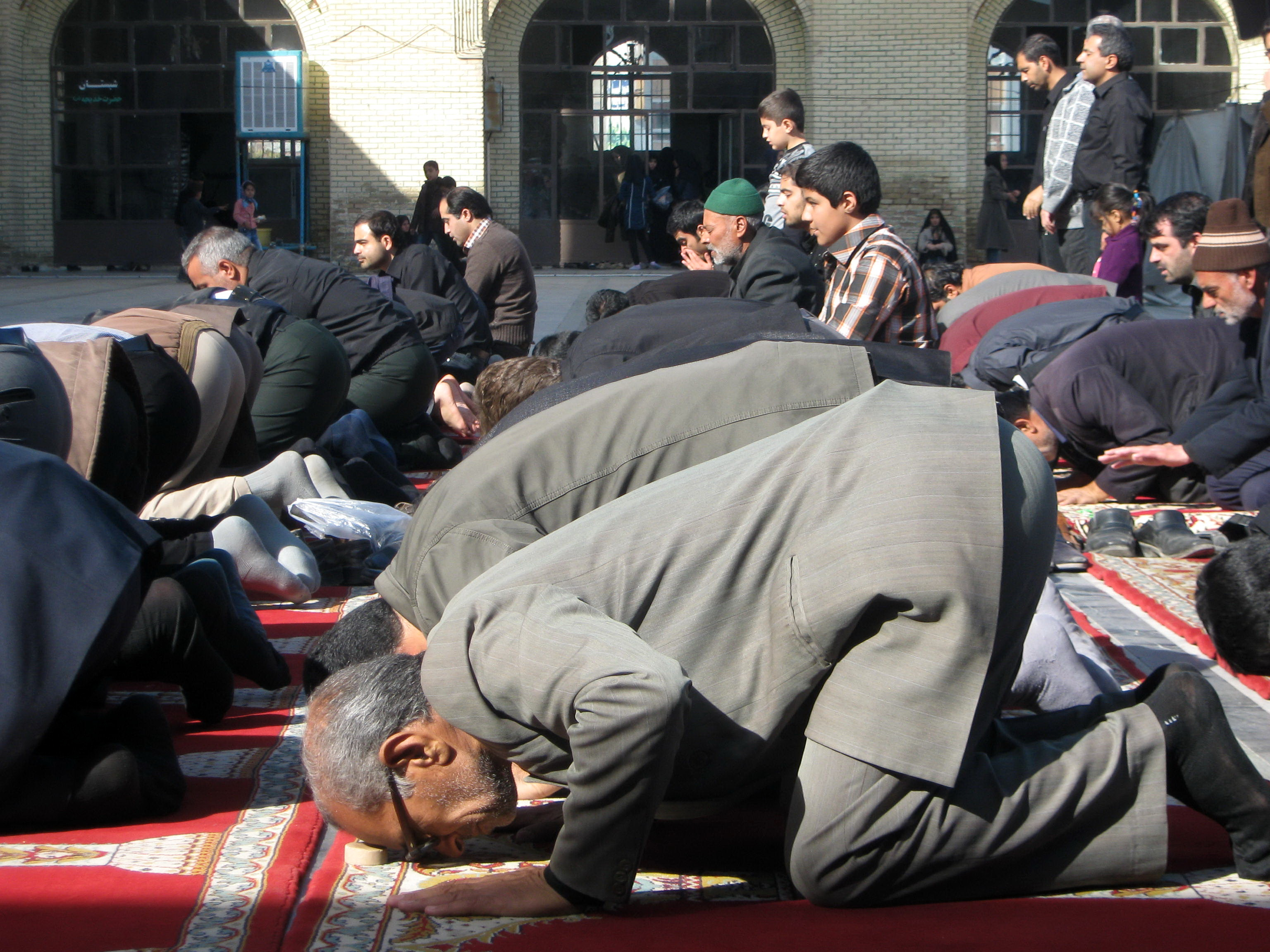
Sujud in Salah.

Maliki and Shafi’i jurists (fuqahā) spoke about the number of prostrations in the verses of the Noble Quran.

In Maliki's fiqh, the four verses, from the surahs of Al-Hajj, An-Najm, Al-Inshiqaq and Al-Alaq, do not result in the prostration of recitation from the Qari because the number of prostrations among the Maliki is eleven (11 prostration), of which ten (10 prostrations) are in Ijma.

This is because Imam Malik ibn Anas stated that it is not one of the strengths of prostration, so it is not a place for prostration with the Malikis.

And their argument for negating the four prostrations in the Mufassal is the saying of Malik ibn Anas in a narration, and Imam Al-Shafiʽi in saying that the intentions of prostration are eleven prostration, none of which is from the Mufassal.

Ibn 'Abd al-Barr said: "This is the saying of Abdullah ibn Umar, Abdullah Ibn Abbas, Said ibn al-Musayyib, Sa'id ibn Jubayr, Hasan al-Basri, Ikrimah al-Barbari, Mujahid ibn Jabr, Ata ibn Abi Rabah, Tawus ibn Kaysan, Malik ibn Anas, and a group of the people of Medina".

It was reported on the authority of Abu Darda that he said: “I prostrate eleven with the Prophet, may God bless him and grant him peace”, in a hadith narrated by Ibn Majah.

And Ibn Abbas narrated: “The Prophet, may Allah’s prayers and peace be upon him, did not prostrate in any of al-Mufassal since he turned to Medina”, in a hadith narrated by Abu Dawood.

== Verses of prostration ==
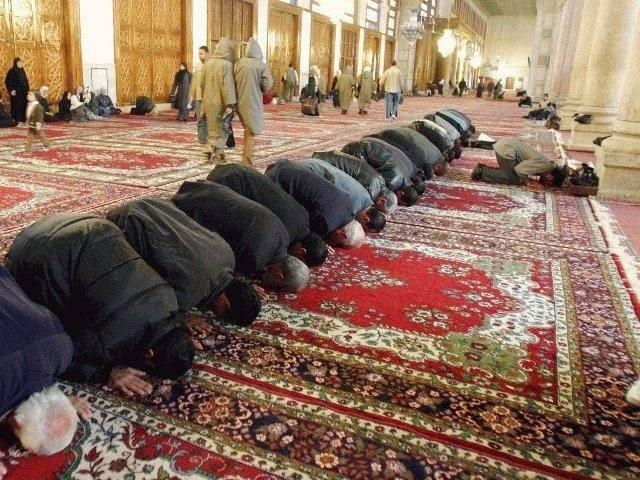
Sujud in Salah.

The Āyats of Sujud Tilawa in the Quran are eleven in the Maliki fiqh, ten of which are defined by the Ijma and applied to Warsh recitation:

1. ۩ Āyah 206, in Surah Al-A'raf.

2. ۩ Āyah 15, in Surah Ar-Ra'd.

3. ۩ Āyah 50, in Surah An-Nahl.

4. ۩ Āyah 109, in Surah Al-Isra.

5. ۩ Āyah 58, in Surah Maryam.

6. ۩ Āyah 18, in Surah Al-Hajj.

7. ۩ Āyah 60, in Surah Al-Furqan.

8. ۩ Āyah 26, in Surah An-Naml.

9. ۩ Āyah 15, in Surah As-Sajdah.

10. ۩ Āyah 38, in Surah Fussilat.

11. ۩ Āyah 24, in Surah Ṣād (outside of Ijma).

The four remaining Sajadates to close the number of fifteen are located in the Surates of the Mufassal going from Surah Qaf to Surah Al-Nas:

12. ۩ Āyah 77, in Surah Al-Hajj.

13. ۩ Āyah 62, in Surah An-Najm.

14. ۩ Āyah 21, in Surah Al-Inshiqaq.

15. ۩ Āyah 19, in Surah Al-Alaq.

In most Mus'hafs of the Quran these are indicated by the symbol ۩, with an over-line on the word/s that invoked the Sujud.

Muslims must prostrate once in order to follow the Sunnah (example) of Muhammad and recite any one or more of the following along with Takbir before and after the Sujud.

== Gallery ==
Unicode symbol of Sujud Tilawa.

Symbol of Sujud Tilawa.

Unicode symbol of Sujud Tilawa.
