= Asbab al-Nuzul =

Historical context in which Quranic verses were revealed

Occasions or circumstances of revelation (Arabic: أسباب النزول, romanized: asbāb al-nuzūl) names the historical context in which Quranic verses were revealed from the perspective of traditional Islam. Though of some use in reconstructing the Qur'an's historicity, asbāb is by nature an exegetical rather than a historiographical genre, and as such usually associates the verses it explicates with general situations rather than specific events. The study of asbāb al-nuzūl is part of the study of Tafsir (interpretation of the Qur'an).

== Etymology ==
Asbāb (أَسْبَابْ) is the plural of the Arabic word sabab (سَبَبْ), which means "cause", "reason", or "occasion", and nuzūl (نُزُولْ) is the verbal noun of the verb root n–z–l
(ن – ز – ل), literally meaning "to descend" or "to send down", and thus (metaphorically) "to reveal", referring God (Allah) sending down a revelation to his prophets.

The reasons for revelation found in the hadiths are divided into types:

1: The answer that the Prophet Muhammad should give to a question that was asked to him

2: Comment on events that occurred.

3: The first type is the category of people, as there are verses that only speak to non-Muslims and some verses only speak to Muslims.

== Origin ==
Modern scholarship has long posited an origin for the sabab al-nuzūl based largely on its function within exegesis. William Montgomery Watt, for example, stressed the narratological significance of these types of reports: "The Quranic allusions had to be elaborated into complete stories and the background filled in if the main ideas were to be impressed on the minds of simple men." John Wansbrough, on the other hand, noted their juridical function, particularly with regard to establishing a chronology of revelation for the purposes of such mechanisms as naskh. Rippin in turn rejected this, arguing that the sabab's primary function is in haggadic/qissaic exegesis, and that this in turn hints at its origin:

The primary (i.e., predominant) function of the sabab in the exegetical texts is not halakhic [juridical] ... the essential role of the material is in haggadic exegesis... I would tentatively trace the origins of this material to the context of the qussās, the wandering story-tellers, and pious preachers and to a basically popular religious worship situation where such stories would prove both enjoyable and edifying.

One thing common to all these theories is the assumption that the sabab is built around the Qur'ānic verse(s) embedded in it. In his extensive survey of early Muslim traditions regarding Muhammad, Rubin upends this consensus (while preserving Rippin's speculation about the ultimately qassaic/story-teller origins of these reports) by arguing that most asbāb originally started as prophetic biographical material into which Qur'anic verses were only later inserted:

To begin with, one should bear in mind that although the traditions known as asbāb al-nuzūl occur in the collections of tafsīr- for example, al-Tabarī's- their birthplace is in the sīra, where they do not yet function as asbāb. These traditions only became asbāb when the Quran exegetes gleaned them from the sīra and recorded them in the tafsīr of the Quran. Within the realm of the sīra, these traditions are still without an exegetic function, because none of them is built around the Quranic verses which occur in it... The basic narrative framework is always independent of Quranic verses and ideas; the Quranic data seem to have been incorporated into the sīra story secondarily, for the sake of embellishment and authorization. In other words, no process of spinning a narrative around a Quranic verse seems to have taken place...

Quranic materials only began to be applied to the non-Quranic basic narrative framework when the sacred scripture became a standard source of guidance. At this stage, the quṣṣāṣ (story-tellers) could promote the Islamic status of their traditions (originally suspect of biblical influence) by extending to them the divine authority of the Quran. This was achieved by dragging various passages from the scriptures into the narrative. The same Quranic extract could actually be installed in different scenes of Muhammad's life...

Some of the asbāb, but not necessarily all of them, were later gleaned from the sīra and later incorporated into the specialized tafsīr and asbāb al-nuzūl compilations.

Rubin bases that conclusion partly upon the very stereotyped way in which "linking words" are used to introduce Qur'anic verse into a report. Mostly, though, he relies upon the existence of multiple parallel non-Qur'anic forms of the narrative for most asbāb. By assuming that a report's link to scripture would not be removed once established, the non-Qur'anic (and thus non-exegetic) version of the report is in fact the original one. Rippin takes issue with this last assumption, though, by arguing that the evidence does not preclude the creation of parallel sīra narratives even after the circulation of a supposedly "authoritative" Qur'anic one.

== Outline and function ==
The Quran was revealed over a period of nearly twenty three years. Muslim scholars agree that the revelations of the Quran can be divided into two broad types: One type includes passages of the Quran which were revealed in response to specific events, incidents or questions put forward to Muhammad. The second type includes passages of the Quran which were not direct responses to any historical or social development in the life of the Muslim community. A thorough understanding of the first type of passages, therefore, depend on knowing the circumstances of the events which occasioned them. Such knowledge is an important tool for explaining the meanings of this type of Quranic verses.

One function of the sabab report is theological. As Rippin notes:

Such reports are cited... out of a general desire to historicize the text of the Qur'ān in order to be able to prove constantly that God really did reveal his book to humanity on earth; the material thereby acts as a witness to God's concern for His creation [ ar-Rahman ]. Indeed al-Suyūtī cites this as one of his understandings of the function of the sabab.

The occasion of revelation's primary function, though, is exegetical, and by enumerating its various uses within Qur'anic interpretation we visit nearly all the problems of concern for classical Muslim exegetes. These problems span the hermeneutical spectrum, from the most basic units of linguistic meaning to such technical intellectual disciplines as law and philosophy and all points in between. A major underlying difficulty encountered at all levels is the Qur'an's lack of structure. This extends beyond the question of temporal ordering to one of basic unity of thought and expression:

It has often been remarked that the Qur'ān lacks an overall cohesive structure... and does not provide within itself many keys for interpretation. One of the very basic problem is that it is often impossible to tell where one pericope ends and the next one begins.

The various levels of interpretation along with their typical problems are listed below in order of increasing hermeneutical complexity:

- Lexical: What is the meaning of a particular word?
- Sunnahs in reciting specific verses?
- Intra-Versal/Sentential: Who or what is the referent of a particular pronoun?
- Inter-Versal/Pericopal: What is the relation between verses? Do they constitute a single meaning/unit of thought, or are they distinct?
- Narratological ("Qissaic"): What is the story being told? Why do the characters in it react in the way they do?
- Historical/Ethnological: What events or personages are being described? What cultural practices are being reported and how do they relate the jāhilī scene?
- Legal ("Hukmic"): What are the legal implications of a particular verse and how do these relate to the remaining corpus of Islamic holy law? Is the ruling limited in scope to the circumstances or even unique instant in which it was revealed, or does it define a general principle with broad applicability?

A detailed examination of the function of asbāb at several of these levels follows. Unless otherwise noted examples all come from Rippin's The function of asbāb al-nuzūl in Qur'ānic exegesis (BSOAS 51). Quotations from the Qur'an are taken from the Abdullah Yusuf `Ali translation.

=== Lexical/sentential ===
A demonstration of the two lowest-level functions of the sabab may be seen in the exegesis of verse 2:44 :

2:44 Do ye enjoin right conduct on the people, and forget (To practise it) yourselves, and yet ye study the Scripture? Will ye not understand?

A sabab put forward by both al-Wāhidī (Kitāb 22) and al-Suyūtī (Lubāb 19) claim this verse was revealed about those Jews of Medina who urged their converted relations to obey Muhammed's example even while they hypocritically refused to do so themselves (such Jewish hypocrisy being a common Qur'ānic polemical motif). The sabab thus fixes the meaning of the pronoun "ye", and also provides a gloss for the word "right conduct" (birr) as the Sunnah of Muhammed.

=== Sunnahs in reciting specific verses ===
The Sunnahs that are prescribed to be done or said when you read certain verses found in many Surahs of the Quran, such as ''Sujud Tilawa'' Defining the prostration of recitation (tilawa) as a movement of prostration resulting from the reason that it is a mustahabb when the recitation reaches one of the verses of prostration. this Sujud occurs during the Tilawa recitation of the Quran, including Salah prayers in Salah al jama'ah. There are fifteen places where Muslims believe that when Muhammad recited a certain verse (ayah) he prostrated to God.

There are also words or supplications that you say after reading certain verses

I offered Salat (Tahajjud - optional night prayer) with the Prophet (ﷺ) one night, and he started reciting (Surat) Al-Baqarah. I thought that he would bow at the end of one hundred Verses, but he continued reciting; I, then, thought that he would perhaps recite the whole (Surah) in a Rak'ah, but he proceeded on, and I thought he would perhaps bow on completing (this Surah); he then started (reciting Surat) An-Nisa'; he then started (Surat) Al-'Imran and his recitation was unhurried. And when he recited the Verses which referred to the Glory of Allah, he glorified Him (by saying Subhan Allah - My Rubb, the Supreme is far removed from every imperfection), the Great, and when he recited the Verses that mention supplication, he supplicated, and when he recited the Verses that mention seeking Refuge of the Rubb, he sought (His) Refuge. Then he bowed and said: "My Rubb, the Supreme is far removed from every imperfection (Subhana Rabbiyal-Azim);" his bowing lasted about the same length of time as his standing (and then on returning to the standing posture after Ruku') he said: "Allah listened to him who praised Him (Sami' Allahu liman hamidah, Rabbana wa lakal hamd)." Then he stood about the same length of time as he had spent in bowing. He then prostrated himself and said: "My Rubb, the Supreme is far removed from every imperfection (Subhana Rabbiyal-A'la)," and his prostration lasted nearly the same length of time as his standing.

—

=== Pericopal ===
One theory of Qur'anic verse arrangement proposes a thematic/topical ordering of the verses (ayat). This, combined with the Qur'an's allusive literary style (e.g. "the Qur'ānic 'they' which is frequently left ambiguous in the text") makes establishing pericopal boundaries difficult, however. Does one verse continue the unit of meaning begun by preceding verses, or does it initiate a new one? Sabab-material was used to both erect and pull down such boundaries, as their use with respect to verses 2:114-2:115 illustrate:

2:114 And who is more unjust than he who forbids that in places for the worship of Allah, Allah's name should be celebrated?-whose zeal is (in fact) to ruin them? It was not fitting that such should themselves enter them except in fear. For them there is nothing but disgrace in this world, and in the world to come, an exceeding torment.
2:115 To Allah belong the east and the West: Whithersoever ye turn, there is the presence of Allah. For Allah is all-Pervading, all-Knowing.

One report "suggests this verse [Q.2:115] is a continuation of Q.2:114 which concerns the destruction of mosques and thus that this verse, 115, intends that the destruction of mosques does not mean that one can no longer face a qibla". Most sabab-material, however, locate Q.2:115 in the context of prayers not delivered in the direction of the qibla under various extenuating circumstances, thus dividing it from Q.2:114 .

=== Narratological ===
The function of asbāb is most straightforward at the narratological level, where the context given identifies the characters of a story, their motivations, and ambient circumstances which influence their behavior.

An extensive example of this is the sabab attributed to Ibn Ishāq (al-Wāhidī, Kitāb 22) for verses Q.2:258 and Q.2:260, detailing Ibrahim's encounter with Nimrod. Because the sabab does not explain why the verses were revealed, only the story within it, though, this report would qualify as an instance of akhbār according to the sabab identification criteria later established by al-Suyūtī.

=== Historical/ethnological ===
For Muslims the definition of the jāhiliyyah scene (i.e. Arabia's pre-Islamic age of "ignorance") was an important concern, but complicated by their religion's competing claims to be both a stark break with this past as well as a continuation of practices begun by "Islam" in its pre-Qur'anic, ur-religion manifestations, as in worship at the Kaaba.

Many "ethnological" asbāb exist for this purpose, with those put forward for Q.2:158 particularly illustrative of their function at this level of interpretation:

2:158 Behold! Safa and Marwa are among the Symbols of Allah. So if those who visit the House in the Season or at other times, should compass them round, it is no sin in them. And if any one obeyeth his own impulse to good,- be sure that Allah is He Who recogniseth and knoweth.

The verse concerns the ritual practice of circumambulating between the hills of Safa and Marwa; the two asbāb cited by al-Wāhidī both describe the controversy regarding this ritual (Q.2:158's occasion of revelation) by reference to the jāhilī scene. The first sabab states that the pagan Arabs practiced this (ur-Islamically sanctioned) ritual, but that they so adulterated it with idolatry that the first Muslims pressed to abandon it until Q.2:158 was revealed. The second sabab provides conflicting ethnological data, stating that the practice was instituted by Muhammed in opposition to the pagans' sacrifices to their idols.

These asbāb have no legal incidence; they function merely to settle a matter of curiosity as well as to contrast the Islamic dispensation with what came before, obviously to the benefit of the former. This imperative, plus the fact that much of the material is contradictory make such asbāb useful only for reconstructing the development of Islamic ideology and identity, rather than the pre-Islamic Arabian past.

=== Legal ===
Legal exegesis is the most hermeneutically complex level of interpretation for several reasons. One is that every ruling must be considered with respect to the corpus of Islamic holy law. If the ruling contradicts some other one, does it abrogate/mitigate its foil, or is it itself abrogated/mitigated? The foil may not always be a particular verse or pericope, but a principle synthesized from multiple rulings. The second, even more basic, complexity resides in determining which verses have legal content. A seemingly proscriptive verse may be made merely polemical by interpretation, while a seemingly non-proscriptive verse may have actual legal import. Lastly there is the issue of juridical inflation/deflation (the latter termed takhsīs) where the scope/applicability of the ruling may be radically increased or decreased by exegesis.

The asbāb surrounding Q.2:115 have already shown how legal consequences may be injected into a seemingly non-hukmic verse. The asbāb for Q.2:79 demonstrate the opposite:

2:79 Then woe to those who write the Book with their own hands, and then say: "This is from Allah," to traffic with it for miserable price!- Woe to them for what their hands do write, and for the gain they make thereby.

Here the reports agree the verse is directed against the Jews, and so a proscription with seemingly broad applicability is almost completely deflated into a polemical filip about Jewish alteration of holy scripture (tahrīf).

Lastly, as an example of juridical inflation, is Q.2:104:

2:104 O ye of Faith! Say not (to the Messenger) words of ambiguous import [rā'inā], but words of respect; and hearken (to him): To those without Faith is a grievous punishment.

The asbāb put forward by the exegetes cannot establish the meaning of the probably-transliterated word rā'inā, but they generally identify it as some sort of curse or mock which the Jews tricked the Muslims into incorporating into their own greetings. In any case:

:Al-Jassās sees the legal significance of the verse as going beyond merely not saying rā'inā; the Jews (or the Arabs) said the word to mock others, according to the sabab- therefore mockery is not permitted; nor are double entendres permitted.

As these examples amply demonstrate, supporting exegetical literature (e.g. hadith, sabab-material) are often decisive in fixing the legal meaning of a particular Qur'anic verse/pericope. Appealing to the raw, unmediated text of the Qur'an as proof of consensus within traditional Islamic law for or against some practice is thus almost always a futile exercise.

== History of Asbab al-Nuzul works ==
The earliest and the most important work in this genre is undoubtedly Kitab asbab al-Nuzul ("Book of occasions of revelation") by Ali ibn Ahmad al-Wahidi (d. 1075 CE). Al-Wahidi mentions occasions of about 570 verses out of 6236 verses of the Quran. Wahidi's work is not only the first attempt to collect all the material regarding the occasions of revelation in one single volume, but it is also the standard upon which all subsequent works were based. al-Wahidi was born in the city of Nishapur and he died there at an advanced age. He was a poet, philologist, grammarian and Quranic commentator. In fact, He was considered a great commentator of the Quran of his time. His main teacher was the famous Quranic commentator al-Thalabi (d. 1036 CE) and Wahidi seems to have enjoyed the support of the Seljuq vizier Nizam al-Mulk.

Another important work is by al-Suyuti (d. 1505 CE) which is a slight improvement of al-Wahidi's book. Suyuti wrote his book about four centuries after al-Wahidi. It contains more occasions of revelation compared to Wahidi's work. His work covers 102 chapters (sura) of the Quran while Wahidi's work covers 83 suras. The name of his book is Lubab al-Nuqul fi Asbab al-Nuzul (meaning "The best of narrations concerning the circumstances of revelation").

No asbāb works from earlier than the 11th century are known, and it is unlikely that this genre of exegetical literature existed before then. Though there is a section titled Nuzūl al-Qur'ān in Ibn al-Nadīm's 10th-century bibliographical catalog Kitāb al-Fihrist (including one Nuzūl al-Qur'ān attributed to the semi-legendary Ibn 'Abbās as transmitted through 'Ikrima), there is no evidence to believe that most of these works ever existed, or that their ambiguous titles signify texts within the asbāb al-nuzūl genre. In Rippin's detailed examination of pre-18th-century exegetical literature, other works include as follows:

- Asbāb al-nuzūl wa qisas al-furqāniyya by Muhammad ibn As'ad al-'Irāqī (died 1171). Contains sabab reports mixed with qisas al-anbiyā (stories of the prophets) material. The former seem independent of al-Wāhidī's compilation and are isnad-less. Exists in two manuscripts copies, one at the Chester Beatty Library (Manuscript 5199).
- A manuscript (Berlin Staatsbibliothek, Catalog no. 3578). ascribed to al-Ja'barī, probably pseudepigraphicaly. Consists of sabab and naskh material interspersed, with the former containing very abbreviated isnads where only the first authority is listed. According to its final page this manuscript was written in 1309.

Though al-Wāhidī may thus be considered the father of this genre (a view consistent with his rather self-serving depiction of asbāb al-nuzūl as the key to all exegesis), al-Suyūtī made significant contributions to it as well, introducing such refinements as limiting reports to only those contemporaneous with the revelation itself (reports related to events described by the verse were reclassified as akhbār) and developing a sabab selection criterion different from al-Wāhidī's rather mechanistic one of scanning for a select few "marker" introductory phrases.

Sabab-material did not originate with the asbāb al-nuzūl genre. The chief innovation of the genre was organizational (i.e. the collection of asbāb-material within one text) and to a lesser degree methodological, and so while no work prior to al-Wāhidī's Kitāb may be properly called an instance of asbāb al-nuzūl, material of equivalent function exists in the earliest hadith and tafsir. This distinction will be maintained here by the use of the term sabab-material for an occasion of revelation which does not necessarily come from a work of asbāb al-nuzūl, and sabab only for one that does.

The reasons for asbāb's status as a secondary genre are implicit in this bibliographical overview. Its late emergence (well into the classical period) plus its reliance on earlier tafsir works even for its raw material prevented asbāb al-nuzūl's emergence as a major, independent approach to Qur'anic interpretation.

== See also ==
- Tafsir
- Naskh
- Qiṣaṣ al-anbiyāʾ – Genre of Islamic literature on the history and stories of prophets
