= Waḥy =

Revelation in Islam

Waḥy (also waḥi, Arabic: وَحْي, IPA: [wæħj]; pl.: وُحِي wuḥī, IPA: [ˈwʊħiː]) is the Arabic word for revelation. In Islamic belief, revelations are God's word delivered by his chosen individuals – known as messenger prophets – to humankind.

== Quran ==
In Islam, the Quran is considered a revelation given to the Islamic prophet, Muhammad. The word awha (أوحى awḥá) occurs in a number of shades of meaning, each of them indicating the main underlying idea of directing or guiding someone or something.

- "...and inspired in each heaven its command" (Quran 41:12 – Sahih International).
- "And your lord inspired to the bee" (16:68).
- "And we inspired to the mother of Moses" (28:7).

Islamic scholars say that there is a clear difference between these kinds of wahy and wahy to the Messenger Prophet. The prophets were very much conscious about revelations and they firmly believed that the revelations were true and came from the Almighty God. The word wahy (revelation) is derived from awha.

In Islamic tradition, Quran 42:51 serves as the basis of understanding for waḥy.

"It is not fitting for a man that Allah should speak to him except by inspiration, or from behind a veil, or by the sending of a messenger to reveal, with Allah's permission, what Allah wills".

Based on this, Islamic scholars have described three ways in which God's revelation can reach his chosen individuals, especially prophets.

- An inspired message – not a word but an idea – can enter the heart of the chosen individuals either in the state of consciousness or in dream.
- The second mode, it is said, is the word heard by the person spoken to, like, from behind a veil (indirectly). An example would be Moses and the burning bush.
- In the third mode, the revelation is sent from God through archangels like Gabriel and is delivered to the prophets. It is the highest form of revelation, and Muslims believe the whole Quran was revealed in this mode.

== Purpose ==
According to Islamic scholar Muhammad Shafi, God has created three media through which human receive knowledge: the senses, the faculty of reason, and the divine revelation; and it is the third one that addresses the liturgical and eschatological issues, answers the questions regarding God's purpose behind creating humankind, and acts as a guidance for the humankind as to choosing the correct way. In Islamic belief, the sequence of divine revelation came to an end with Muhammad.

== Mode of descent ==
As regard to revelation received by Muhammad, Muslim sources mention various modes in which they believe revelation came to him. Muslim scholar Muhammad Shafi has summarised five modes of descent. The common mode was that Muhammad would hear sound like "the ringing of a bell" after which he found the message committed to his memory. Sometimes, the archangel would come in human shape, most often of Dihyah al-Kalbi. In two cases, Gabriel appeared in his real form. Once, on the night of Miraj, Muhammad is believed to have had a direct conversation with God. In the fifth mode, Gabriel would let the revelation enter into Muhammad's heart.

The last two verses of Al-Baqarah were revealed directly to Muhammad during the Night Journey and Ascension, without the mediation of Angel Gabriel (Jibreel), which is a unique distinction.

== See also ==
- Ilham
- Divine inspiration
- Tanzil
