= Āyah =

Verse of the Quran

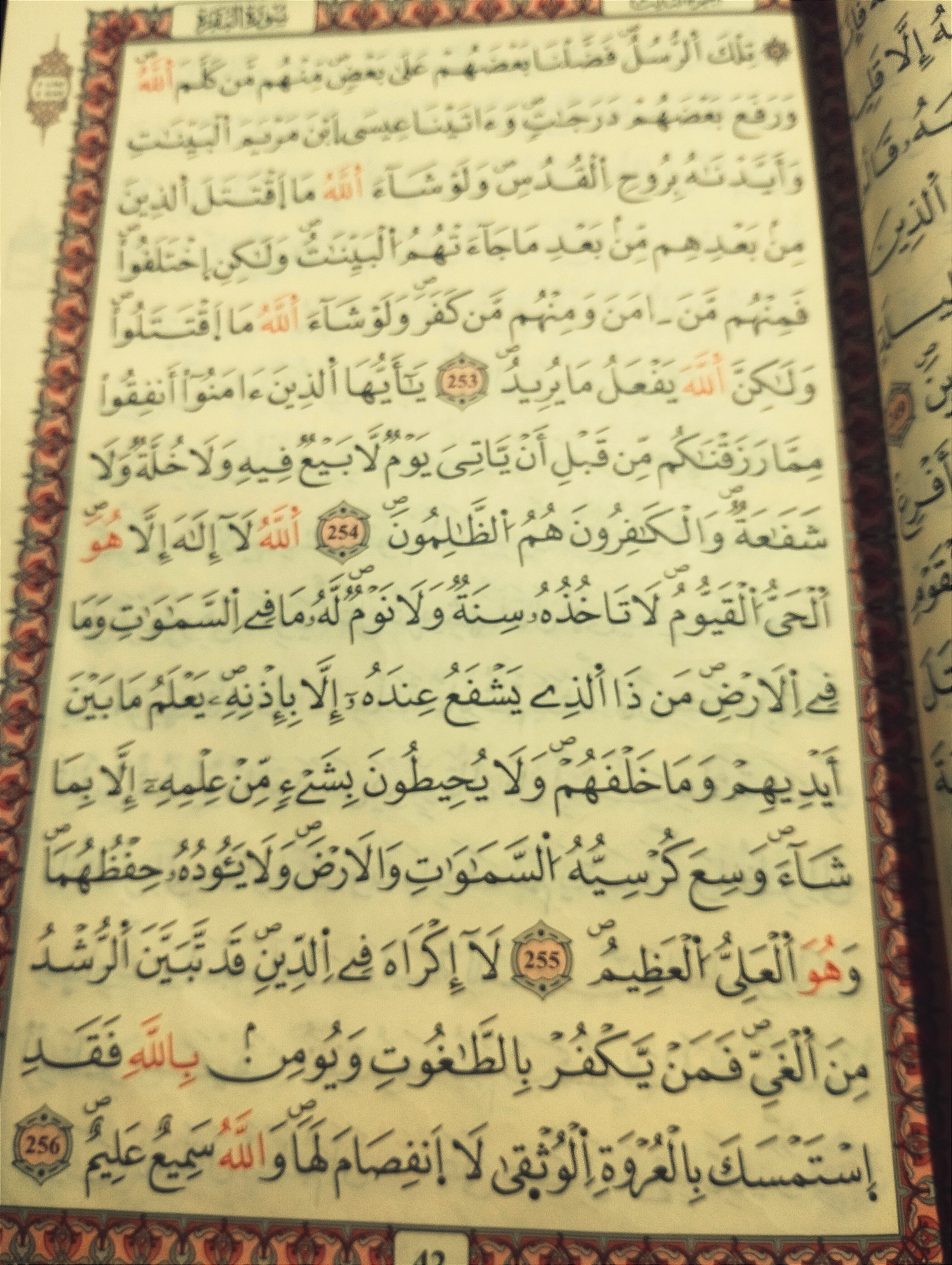
A Quran showing verses of Al-Baqarah, Verse 253 to Verse 256, the Ayat al Kursi which is the 255th verse is also shown.

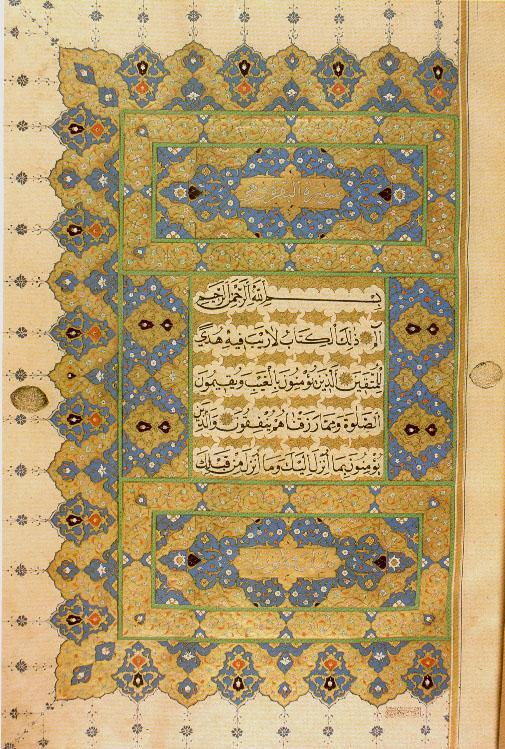
A 16th-century Quran opened to show sura (chapter) 2, ayat (verses) 1–4.

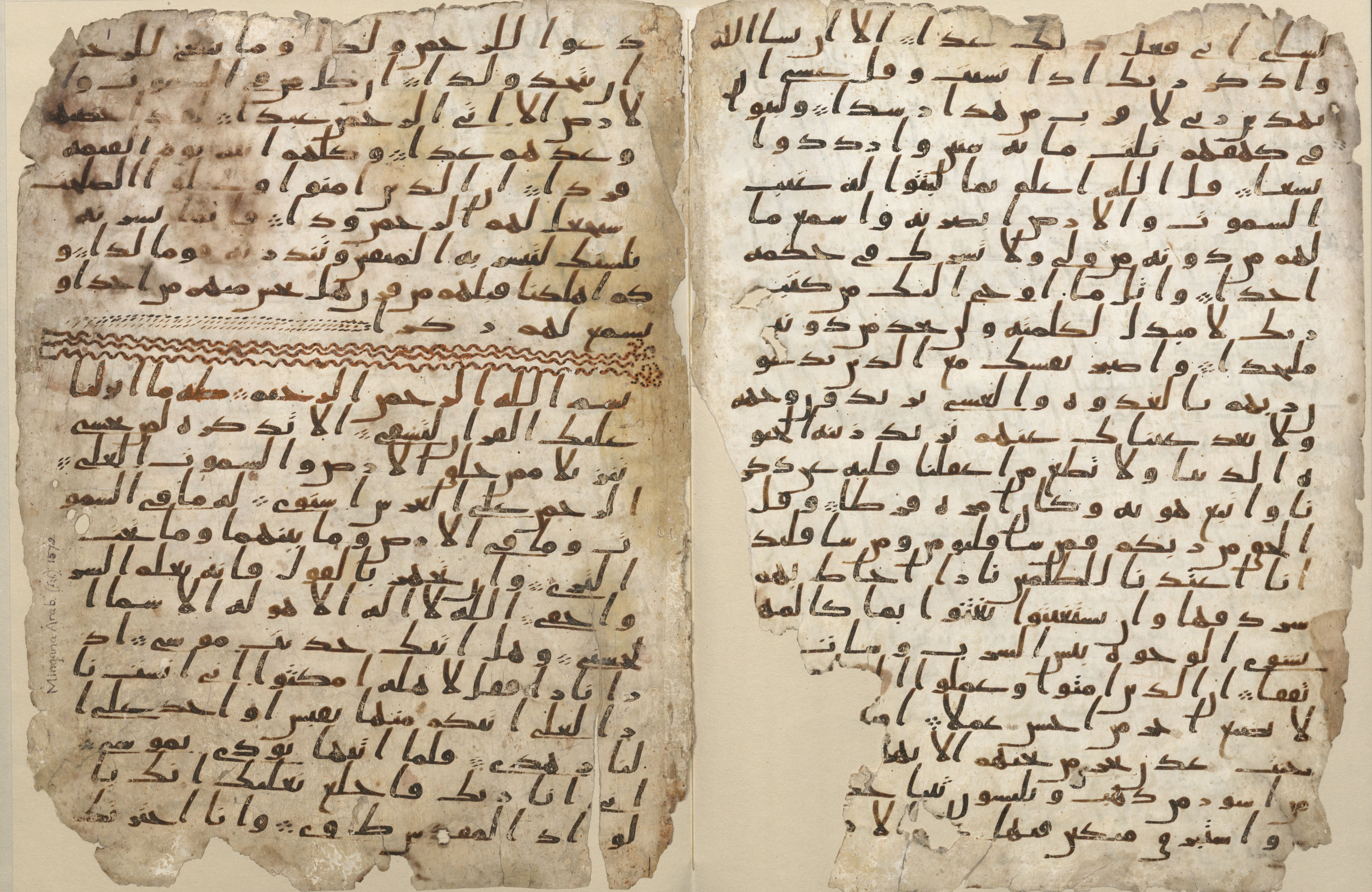

An āyah (Arabic: آية, Arabic pronunciation: [ʔaː.ja]; plural: آيات ʾāyāt) is a "verse" in the Quran, one of the statements of varying length that make up the chapters (surah) of the Quran and are marked by a number. In a purely linguistic context the word means "evidence", "sign" or "miracle", and thus may refer to things other than Quranic verses, such as religious obligations (āyat taklīfiyyah) or cosmic phenomena (āyat takwīniyyah). In the Quran it is referred to with both connotations in several verses such as:

تِلْكَ آيَاتُ ٱللَّٰهِ نَتْلُوهَا عَلَيْكَ بِٱلْحَقِّۖ فَبِأَيِّ حَدِيثٍۭ بَعْدَ ٱللَّٰهِ وَآيَاتِهِۦ يُؤْمِنُونَ
"These are the āyahs of Allah that We recite for you in truth. So what discourse will they believe after God and His āyahs?"

— Quran 45:6

== Overview of the meaning ==
Although meaning "verse" when using the Quran, it is doubtful whether āyah means anything other than "sign", "proof", or "remarkable event" in the Quran's text. The "signs" refer to various phenomena, ranging from the universe, its creation, the alternation between day and night, rainfall, and the life and growth of plants. Other references are to miracles or to the rewards of belief and the fate of unbelievers. For example:

"And of his signs is the creation of the heavens and earth and what He has dispersed throughout them of creatures." (Q42:29)
"And a sign for them is the dead earth. We have brought it to life and brought forth from it grain, and from it, they eat." (Q36:33)
"... and they denied him; therefore we destroyed them. Herein is indeed a sign yet most of them are not believers." (Q26:139)
"... you are but a mortal like us. So bring some sign if you are of the truthful." (Q26:154)

Chapters (surah) in the Quran consist of several verses, varying in number from 3 to 286. Within a long chapter, the verses may be further grouped into thematic sequences passages.

For the purpose of interpretation, the verses are separated into two groups: those that are clear and unambiguous (muhkam) and those that are ambiguous (mutashabeh). This distinction is based on the Quran itself: "It is God Who has sent down to you the Book. In it are verses that are 'clear', they are the foundation of the Book. Others are 'allegorical' but those in whose hearts is perversity follow the part thereof that is allegorical, seeking discord, and searching for its hidden meanings, but no one knows its hidden meanings except God. And those who are firmly grounded in knowledge say: We believe in the Book, the whole of it is from our Lord. And none will grasp the Message except men of understanding." (Note: "Al-Imran from the Yusuf Ali translation of the Quran online at the Quranic Arabic Corpus.)

An incorrect anti-Islamic claim is that the number of verses in the Quran is 6,666. In fact, the total number of verses in the Quran is 6,236 excluding Bismillah and 6,348 including Bismillah. (There are 114 chapters in the Quran, however there are only 112 unnumbered Bismillah's because Surah At-Tawbah does not have one at the beginning and fatiha's is numbered, there is another Bismillah in the middle of āyah 30 of Surah An-Naml but it's not included because it has already been added as a verse.)

The Unicode symbols for a Quran verse, including U+06DD (۝), (Note: A (scanned) example of the Unicode ayah character is on page 3 of this Proposal for additional Unicode characters.) and U+08E2 (࣢).

The first āyah in the Quran from a chronological order is Read [O Muhammad!] in the name of your Lord who created (Q96:1) from surah Al-Alaq. The first āyah from a traditional order is In the name of God, the Compassionate Merciful One from surah Al-Fatiha. The first ayahs after the opening surah are ʾalif-lām-mīm. This is the Scripture whereof there is no doubt, a guidance for the God-fearing, from surah Al-Baqara.

== See also ==
- Ayatollah
- Quranism
