= Ja'far Sobhani =

Iranian Grand Ayatollah

Grand Ayatollah Jafar Sobhani آيت الله العظمى جعفر سبحانى
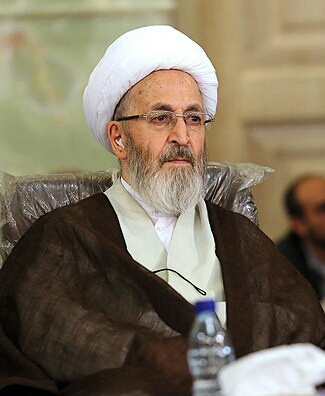
- Sobhani in 2015

Member of the Assembly of Experts for Constitution
- In office 15 August 1979 – 15 November 1979
- Constituency: East Azerbaijan Province

Personal details
- Born: 9 April 1929 (age 97) Tabriz, Iran
- Party: Society of Seminary Teachers of Qom
- Other political affiliations: Muslim People's Republic Party (1979)
- Children: Saeid Sobhani
- Website: http://tohid.ir/
- Religion: Islam
- Denomination: Twelver Shīʿā
- School: Jaʿfari
- Main interests: Theological work

Grand Ayatollah Jafar Sobhani (Persian: جعفر سبحانی; born 9 April 1929) is an Iranian Twelver Shia marja, influential theologian and writer. Sobhani was a former member of the Society of Seminary Teachers of Qom and founder of Imam Sadiq Institute in Qom.

== Education ==
Ayatollah Ja'far Sobhani learned Arabic literature, Principles of Islamic jurisprudence in the Islamic Seminary. In 1946, he went to Islamic Seminary in Qom. In the Islamic Seminary, he took part in famous teachers' classes of Fiqh, Usool, Tafsir, and philosophy. Sobhani's important teachers were Seyyed Hossein Borujerdi, Khomeini, and Mirza Sayyed Mohammad Tabatabai near 15 years.

== Activities ==
- Qom Islamic Seminary's lecturer and scholar in Fiqh, Principles of Fiqh, history, rijal and theological studies
- Founder and director of Maktabe Islam magazine
- Founder and director of Kalaame Islami magazine
- Established an institute for theological research known as Imam Sadiq Institute
- Participated in writing the Constitution of the Islamic Republic of Iran
- Writer of a thematic interpretation of the Quran
- Fighting with Wahhabism
- Established the field of Ilm al-Kalam in the seminary of Qom
- Published more than 300 researches

== Political Activity ==
Ayatollah Sobhani was an opponent of the Pahlavi regime and, after the victory of the Islamic Revolution, he attended as a representative of the people of East Azerbaijan in the Assembly of Experts and also participated in drafting the Constitution of the Islamic Republic.

In October 2023, Sobhani condemned Israeli attacks on the Gaza Strip and called them brutal and inhumane. He called on the international community and Muslim countries to oppose the attacks and urged the United Nations and Muslim leaders to take action to stop them.

In 2026, following the February 28 attacks on Iran, Sobhani offered condolences for the killing of Ali Khamenei and other Iranian civilians, including women and children. He described Khamenei and the other victims as “wronged” and asked God not to let their blood go unanswered and to take revenge on their “wicked” and “vile” enemies.

== Books ==
He has several Arabic and Persian books that are categorized in seven fields as Fiqh, Principles of Islamic jurisprudence, Tafsir, Ilm al-Kalam, Philosophy, History of Islam, and Biographical evaluation. In 2001, Doctrines of Shi'i Islam: A Compendium of Imami Beliefs and Practices book (ISBN 1860647804) was translated into English and published by I. B. Tauris. Some of his books include:

#	Subjects	Books
1	Fiqh	Religious precepts of travel
2	Principles of Islamic Jurisprudence	The four theses
3	Tafsir	Manshur Jawid - in Persian in (14 vol.), (Mafahim al-Quran - in Arabic in (10 vol.)). [Thematic Exegesis]; Muniat al-Talbin fi Tafsir al-Quran al-Mubin - in Arabic in (21 vol.)). [Consecutive Exegesis]; Tafsir tartibi (Consecutive Exegesis) - in Persian; Interpretation of Surah Ar-Ra'd; Interpretation of Surah Al-Furqan; Interpretation of Surah At-Tawba; Interpretation of Surah Al-Munafiqun; Interpretation of Surah Al-Hadid; Interpretation of Surah Al-Hujurat
4	Ilm al-Kalam	Understanding the attributes of God; Introduction to principles of Islam; Resort; Wahhabism
5	Philosophy	Knowledge in Islamic philosophy; An analysis of Marx's philosophy
6	History of Islam	History of Islam; Biography of Imams in simple language; Who is Muhammad?, also known as The Message
7	Beliefs	Doctrines of Shi'i Islam: A Compendium of Imami Beliefs and Practices
8	The Beliefs and History of the Islamic Sects	Al-Milal wa al-Nihal - in Persian and Arabic (8 vol.)
9	Biographical evaluation	General in Biographical evaluation; Biography of Shia leaders
10	Others	Password win famous men; Questions and responses
