= Al-Musabbihat =

Certain suras of the Quran

Al-Musabbihat (Arabic: الْمُسَبِّحَاتِ) are those Surahs of the Quran that begin with statements of Allah's glorification: 'Subhana', 'Sabbaha', and 'Yusabbihu'. According to Islamic scholar Muhammad Shafi (1897–1976) the collective name of the series Al-Musabbihat refers to the following five or seven Surahs:

- Al-Hadid (57th)
- Al-Hashr (59th)
- As-Saff (61st)
- Al-Jumua (62nd)
- At-Taghabun (64th)

Sometimes it also includes:

- Al-Isra (17th)
- Al-Ala (87th)

Among the first five Surahs, the first three, namely Al-Hadid, Al-Hashr and As-Saff, commence with the past perfect tense 'sabbaha' "purity has been proclaimed" whilst the last two, namely Al-Jumu'ah and At-Taghabun, commence with the imperfect tense yusabbihu [purity is proclaimed]. This implies that the purity of God should be declared at all times, the past, the present and the future.

According to Hadith Muhammad would recite the Al-Musabbihat before he went to sleep and said: "Indeed there is an Ayah in them that is better than one thousand Ayat." Ibn Kathir commented that this verse referred to is "Huwal awwallu wal aakhiru wazzaahiru wal baatinu wahuwa bi-kulli shai-in aleem." (Al-Hadid 57:3).

== See also ==
- Al-Fatiha (the first surah in the Quran)
- Al-Mu'awwidhatayn (the last two surahs of the Quran)
- Muqattaʿat (surahs in the Quran that begin with disconnected letters)
