= Zayd ibn Arqam =

- Died: c. 686 CE (66 AH); Kufa
- Occupations: Sahabah; Hadith narrator
- Known for: Companion of Muhammad

Zayd ibn Arqam (Arabic: زيد بن أرقم) was a companion of the Islamic prophet Muhammad from the tribe of Banu Khazraj, and a senior Companion from the Ansar (helpers) in Medina, he attended 17 campaigns with Muhammad and died in 66 Hijri, which corresponds to 685-686 CE.

He was the first person to give his home for the first Salat (ritual prayer) in Islam, which was led by Muhammad. He gave allegiance to Abu Bakr.

After the Invasion of Banu Mustaliq, Abd Allah ibn Ubayy, who was referred to as the head of the "Hypocrites" (munāfiqūn), was furious for the challenge which the Muslims showed towards the hostile plans and intrigues woven behind closed doors, and swore "the most honourable will expel the meanest out of Madinah," and added: "They [the Muslims] have outnumbered and shared us our land. If you fatten your dog, it will eat you." Zayd ibn Arqam narrated this to Muhammad who then asked for Abd Allah ibn Ubayy's presence. Ibn Ubayy swore oaths denying he had stated something like this and because of this he was let go. But later on the testimony of Zayd ibn Arqam was verified by the revelation of Surah Al-Munafiqun.
