= Celibacy =

State of voluntarily being unmarried and sexually abstinent

Celibacy (from Latin caelibatus) is the state of voluntarily being unmarried, sexually abstinent, or both. It is often in association with the role of a religious official or devotee. In its narrow sense, the term celibacy is applied only to those for whom the unmarried state is the result of a sacred vow, act of renunciation, or religious conviction. In a wider sense, it is commonly understood to only mean abstinence from sexual activity.

Celibacy has existed in one form or another throughout history, in virtually all the major religions of the world, and views on it have varied. The Hindu concept of brahmacharya encourages celibacy during adolescence, to allow one to focus on learning, and in later years, as a way of attaining spiritual liberation. Jainism, on the other hand, preached complete celibacy even for young monks and considered celibacy to be an essential behavior to attain moksha. Buddhism is similar to Jainism in this respect. There were, however, significant cultural differences in the various areas where Buddhism spread, which affected the local attitudes toward celibacy. A somewhat similar situation existed in Japan, where the Shinto tradition also opposed celibacy. In most native African and Native American religious traditions, celibacy has been viewed negatively as well, although there were exceptions like periodic celibacy practiced by some Mesoamerican warriors.

The Romans viewed celibacy as an aberration and legislated fiscal penalties against it, with the exception of the Vestal Virgins, who took a 30-year vow of chastity in order to devote themselves to the study and correct observance of state rituals. In Christianity, celibacy means the promise to live either virginal or celibate in the future. Such a vow of celibacy has been normal for some centuries for Catholic priests, Catholic and Eastern Orthodox monks, and nuns. In addition, a promise or vow of celibacy may be made in the Anglican Communion and some Protestant churches or communities, such as the Shakers; for members of religious orders and religious congregations; and for hermits, consecrated virgins, and deaconesses. Judaism and Islam have denounced celibacy, as both religions emphasize marriage and family life; however, the priests of the Essenes, a Jewish sect during the Second Temple period, practised celibacy. It is reported in one famous hadith that the Islamic prophet Muhammad explicitly rejected the practice of celibacy.

== Etymology ==
The English word celibacy derives from the Latin caelibatus, "state of being unmarried", from Latin caelebs, meaning "unmarried". This word derives from two Proto-Indo-European stems, *kaiwelo- "alone" and *lib(h)s- "living".

== Abstinence and celibacy ==
The words abstinence and celibacy are often used interchangeably, but are not necessarily the same thing. Sexual abstinence, also known as continence, is abstaining from some or all aspects of sexual activity, often for some limited period of time, while celibacy may be defined as a voluntary religious vow not to marry or engage in sexual activity. Asexuality is commonly conflated with celibacy and sexual abstinence, but it is considered distinct from the two, as celibacy and sexual abstinence are behavioral and those who use those terms for themselves are generally motivated by factors such as an individual's personal or religious beliefs.

A. W. Richard Sipe, while focusing on the topic of celibacy in Catholicism, states that "the most commonly assumed definition of celibate is simply an unmarried or single person, and celibacy is perceived as synonymous with sexual abstinence or restraint." Sipe adds that even in the relatively uniform milieu of Catholic priests in the United States there seems to be "simply no clear operational definition of celibacy". Elizabeth Abbott commented on the terminology in her A History of Celibacy (2001) writing that she "drafted a definition of celibacy that discarded the rigidly pedantic and unhelpful distinctions between celibacy, chastity, and virginity".

The concept of "new" celibacy was introduced by Gabrielle Brown in her 1980 book The New Celibacy. In a revised version (1989) of her book, she claims abstinence to be "a response on the outside to what's going on, and celibacy is a response from the inside". According to her definition, celibacy (even short-term celibacy that is pursued for non-religious reasons) is much more than not having sex. It is more intentional than abstinence, and its goal is personal growth and empowerment. Although Brown repeatedly states that celibacy is a matter of choice, she clearly suggests that those who do not choose this route are somehow missing out. This new perspective on celibacy is echoed by several authors, including Elizabeth Abbott, Wendy Keller, and Wendy Shalit.

== Buddhism ==
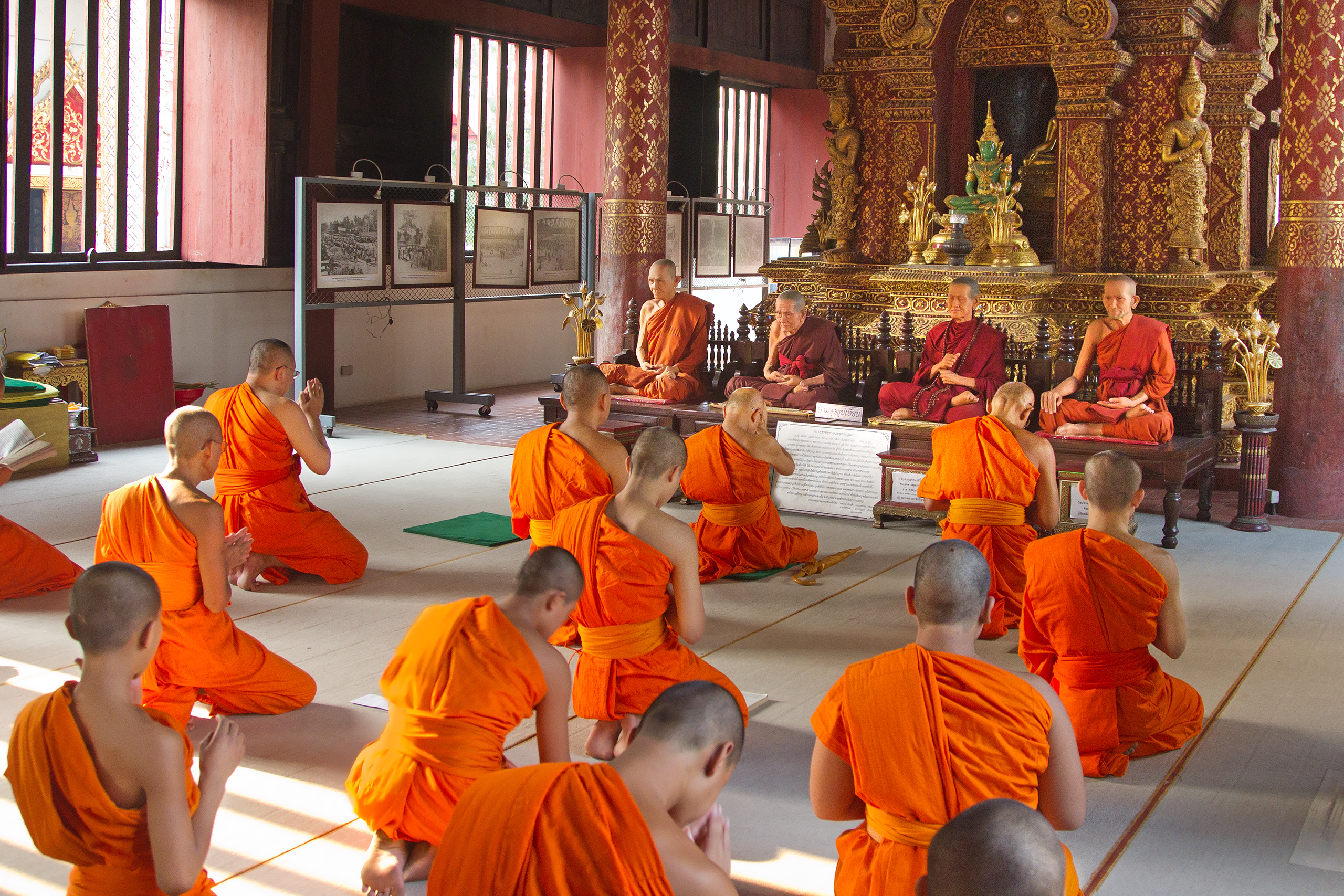
Buddhist monks in Chiang Mai Province, Thailand

The rule of celibacy in the Buddhist religion, whether Mahayana or Theravada, has a long history. Celibacy was advocated as an ideal rule of life for all monks and nuns by Gautama Buddha, except in Japan where it is not strictly followed due to historical and political developments following the Meiji Restoration. In Japan, celibacy was an ideal among Buddhist clerics for hundreds of years. But violations of clerical celibacy were so common for so long that finally, in 1872, state laws made marriage legal for Buddhist clerics. Subsequently, ninety percent of Buddhist monks/clerics married. An example is Higashifushimi Kunihide, a prominent Buddhist priest of Japanese royal ancestry who was married and a father whilst serving as a monk for most of his lifetime.

Gautama, later known as the Buddha, is known for his renunciation of his wife, Princess Yasodharā, and son, Rahula. In order to pursue an ascetic life, he needed to renounce aspects of the impermanent world, including his wife and son. Later on both his wife and son joined the ascetic community and are mentioned in the Buddhist texts to have become enlightened.

== Christianity ==
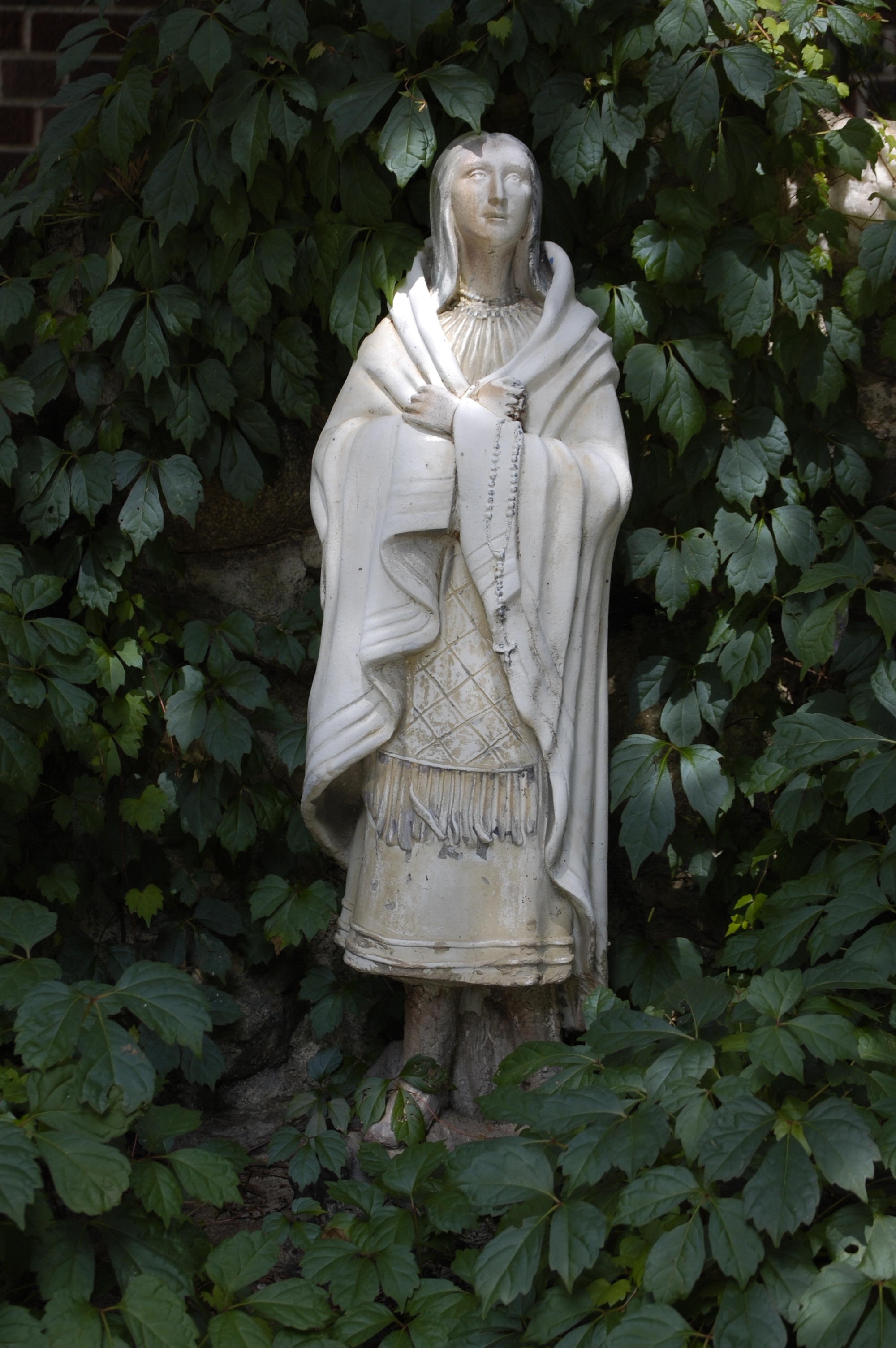
Saint Kateri Tekakwitha, an Algonquin-Mohawk Catholic laywoman who took a private vow of perpetual virginity

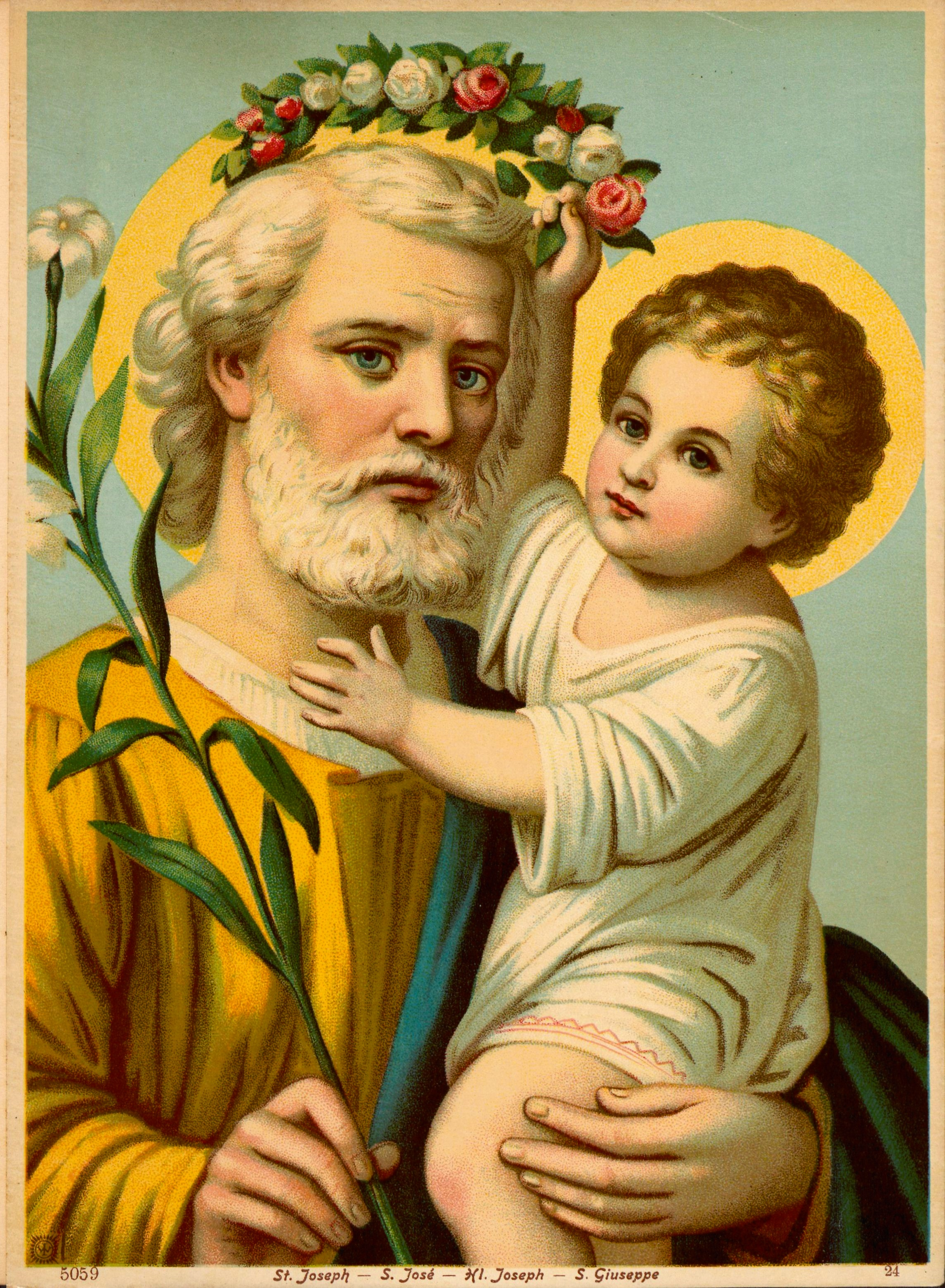
Saint Joseph is regarded as a main patron saint of virginity, due to his chaste life and heart

There is no commandment in the New Testament that Jesus Christ's disciples have to live in celibacy. However, it is a general view that Christ himself lived a life of perfect chastity; thus, "Voluntary chastity is the imitation of him who was the virgin Son of a virgin Mother". One of his invocations is "King of virgins and lover of stainless chastity" (Rex virginum, amator castitatis).

Furthermore, Christ, when his disciples suggest it is "better not to marry," stated "Not everyone can accept this word, but only those to whom it has been given. For there are eunuchs who have been so from birth, and there are eunuchs who have been made eunuchs by others, and there are eunuchs who have made themselves eunuchs for the sake of the kingdom of heaven. Let anyone accept this who can" (Matthew 19:10-12, NRSV). While eunuchs were not universally celibate, over subsequent centuries this statement has come to be interpreted as referring to celibacy.

Paul the Apostle emphasized the importance of overcoming the desires of the flesh and saw the state of celibacy being superior to that of marriage. Paul made parallels between the relations between spouses and God's relationship with the church. "Husbands, love your wives even as Christ loved the church. Husbands should love their wives as their own bodies" (Ephesians 5:25–28). Paul himself was celibate and said that his wish was "that all of you were as I am" (1 Corinthians 7:7). In fact, this entire chapter endorses celibacy while also clarifying that marriage is also acceptable.

The early Christians lived in the belief that the end of the world would soon come upon them, and saw no point in planning new families and having children. According to Chadwick, this was why Paul encouraged both celibate and marital lifestyles among the members of the Corinthian congregation, regarding celibacy as the preferable of the two.

In the counsels of perfection (evangelical counsels), which include chastity alongside poverty and obedience, Jesus is said to have "[given] the rule of the higher life, founded upon his own most perfect life", for those who seek "the highest perfection" and feel "called to follow Christ in this way"—i.e. through such "exceptional sacrifices".

A number of early Christian martyrs were women or girls who had given themselves to Christ in perpetual virginity, such as Saint Agnes and Saint Lucy. According to most Christian thought, the first sacred virgin was Mary, the mother of Jesus, who was consecrated by the Holy Spirit during the Annunciation. Tradition also has it that the Apostle Matthew consecrated virgins. In the Catholic Church and the Orthodox churches, a consecrated virgin is a woman who has been consecrated by the church to a life of perpetual virginity in the service of the church.

=== Desert Fathers ===
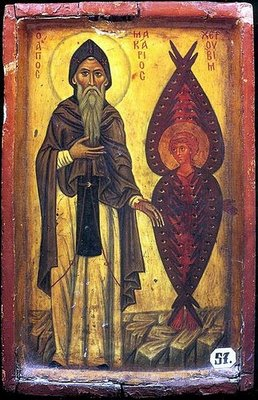
Saint Macarius and a Cherub from Saint Catherine's Monastery, Sinai, Egypt

The Desert Fathers were Christian hermits and ascetics who had a major influence on the development of Christianity and celibacy. Paul of Thebes is often credited with being the first hermit or anchorite to go to the desert, but it was Anthony the Great who launched the movement that became the Desert Fathers. Sometime around AD 270, Anthony heard a Sunday sermon stating that perfection could be achieved by selling all of one's possessions, giving the proceeds to the poor, and following Christ (Matthew 19:21). He followed the advice and made the further step of moving deep into the desert to seek complete solitude.

Over time, the model of Anthony and other hermits attracted many followers, who lived alone in the desert or in small groups. They chose a life of extreme asceticism, renouncing all the pleasures of the senses, rich food, baths, rest, and anything that made them comfortable. Thousands joined them in the desert, mostly men but also a handful of women. Religious seekers also began going to the desert seeking advice and counsel from the early Desert Fathers. By the time of Anthony's death, there were so many men and women living in the desert in celibacy that it was described as "a city" by Anthony's biographer.

The first Conciliar document on clerical celibacy of the Western Church (Synod of Elvira, c. 305 can. xxxiii) states that the discipline of celibacy is to refrain from the use of marriage, i.e. refrain from having carnal contact with one's spouse.

According to the later St. Jerome (c. 347 – 420), celibacy is a moral virtue, consisting of living in the flesh, but outside the flesh, and so being not corrupted by it (vivere in carne praeter carnem). Celibacy excludes not only libidinous acts, but also sinful thoughts or desires of the flesh. Jerome referred to marriage prohibition for priests when he claimed in Against Jovinianus that Peter and the other apostles had been married before they were called, but subsequently gave up their marital relations.

In the Catholic, Orthodox and Oriental Orthodox traditions, bishops are required to be celibate. In the Eastern Catholic and Orthodox traditions, priests and deacons are allowed to be married, yet have to remain celibate if they are unmarried at the time of ordination.

=== Augustinian view ===
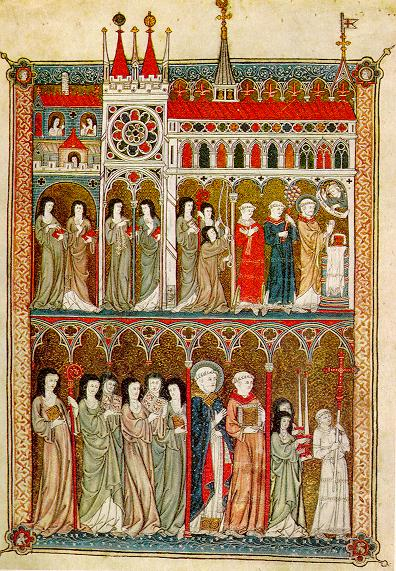
Nuns in procession, French manuscript, c. 1300

In the early Church, higher clerics lived in marriages. Augustine taught that the original sin of Adam and Eve was either an act of foolishness (insipientia) followed by pride and disobedience to God, or else inspired by pride. The first couple disobeyed God, who had told them not to eat of the tree of the knowledge of good and evil (Gen 2:17). The tree was a symbol of the order of creation. Self-centeredness made Adam and Eve eat of it, thus failing to acknowledge and respect the world as it was created by God, with its hierarchy of beings and values. They would not have fallen into pride and lack of wisdom, if Satan had not sown into their senses "the root of evil" (radix mali). Their nature was wounded by concupiscence or libido, which affected human intelligence and will, as well as affections and desires, including sexual desire. The sin of Adam is inherited by all human beings. Already in his pre-Pelagian writings, Augustine taught that original sin was transmitted by concupiscence, which he regarded as the passion of both soul and body, making humanity a massa damnata (mass of perdition, condemned crowd) and much enfeebling, though not destroying, the freedom of the will.

In the early 3rd century, the Canons of the Apostolic Constitutions decreed that only lower clerics might still marry after their ordination, but marriage of bishops, priests, and deacons were not allowed.

=== After Augustine ===
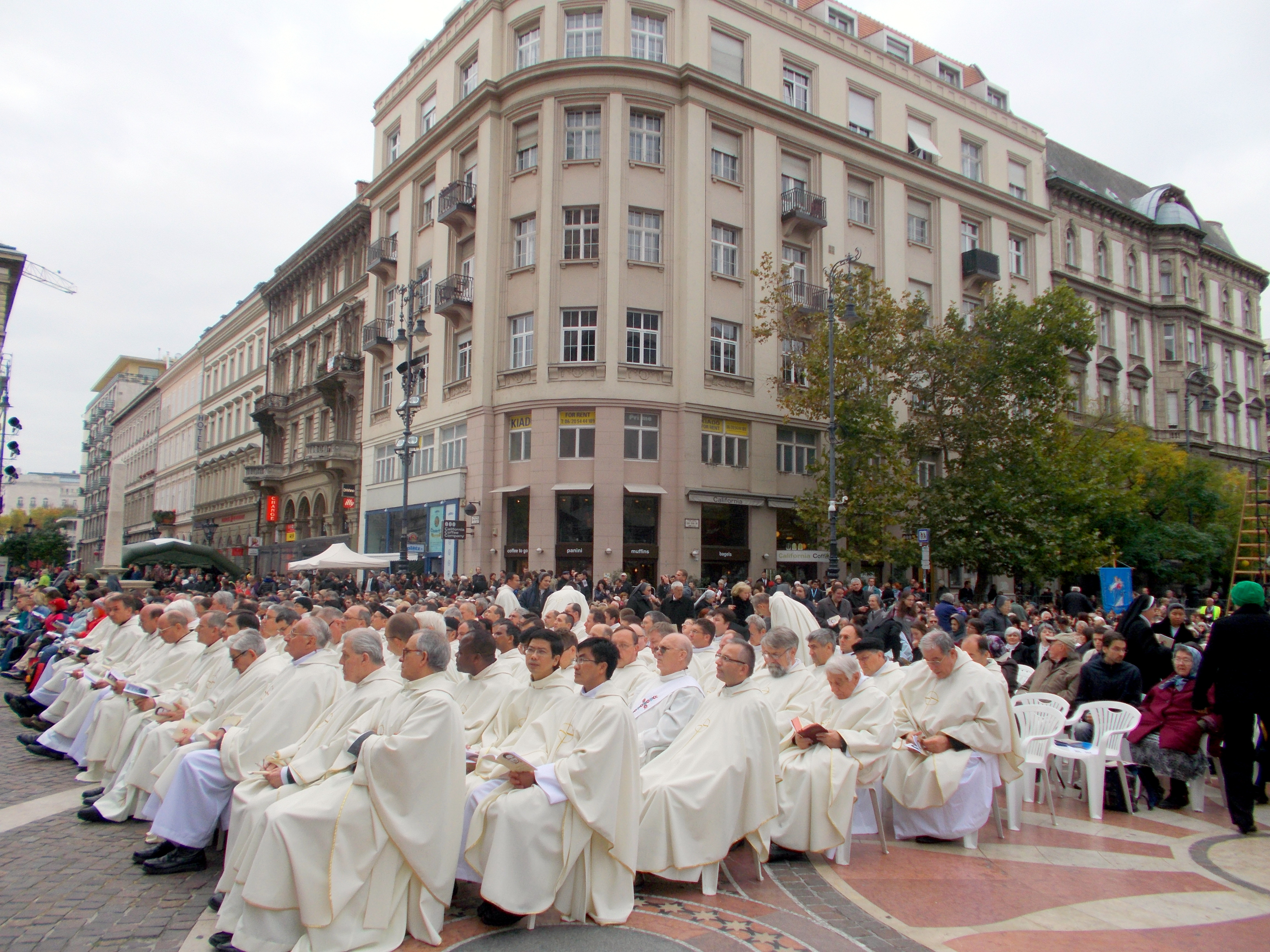
Catholic priests from all over the world in Budapest, 2013

One explanation for the origin of obligatory celibacy is that it is based on the writings of Saint Paul, who wrote of the advantages that celibacy allowed a man in serving the Lord. Celibacy was popularised by the early Christian theologians like Saint Augustine of Hippo and Origen. Another possible explanation for the origins of obligatory celibacy revolves around more practical reason, "the need to avoid claims on church property by priests' offspring". It remains a matter of Canon Law (and often a criterion for certain religious orders, especially Franciscans) that priests may not own land and therefore cannot pass it on to legitimate or illegitimate children. The land belongs to the Church through the local diocese as administered by the Local Ordinary (usually a bishop), who is often an ex officio corporation sole. Celibacy is viewed differently by the Catholic Church and the various Protestant communities. It includes clerical celibacy, celibacy of the consecrated life and voluntary celibacy.

The Protestant Reformation rejected celibate life and sexual continence for preachers. Protestant celibate communities, including religious orders exist, especially from Lutheran and Anglican backgrounds. The Daughters of Mary is a Lutheran religious order of nuns who have taken vows of chastity, poverty, and obedience. A few minor Christian sects advocate celibacy as a better way of life. These groups included the Shakers, the Harmony Society and the Ephrata Cloister.

Many evangelicals prefer the term "abstinence" to "celibacy". Assuming everyone will marry, they focus their discussion on refraining from premarital sex and focusing on the joys of a future marriage. But some evangelicals, particularly older singles, desire a positive message of celibacy that moves beyond the "wait until marriage" message of abstinence campaigns. They seek a new understanding of celibacy that is focused on God rather than a future marriage or a lifelong vow to the Church.

There are also many Pentecostal churches which practice celibate ministry. For instance, the full-time ministers of the Pentecostal Mission are celibate and generally single. Married couples who enter full-time ministry may become celibate and could be sent to different locations.

=== Catholic Church ===
During the first three or four centuries, no law was promulgated prohibiting clerical marriage. Celibacy was a matter of choice for bishops, priests, and deacons.

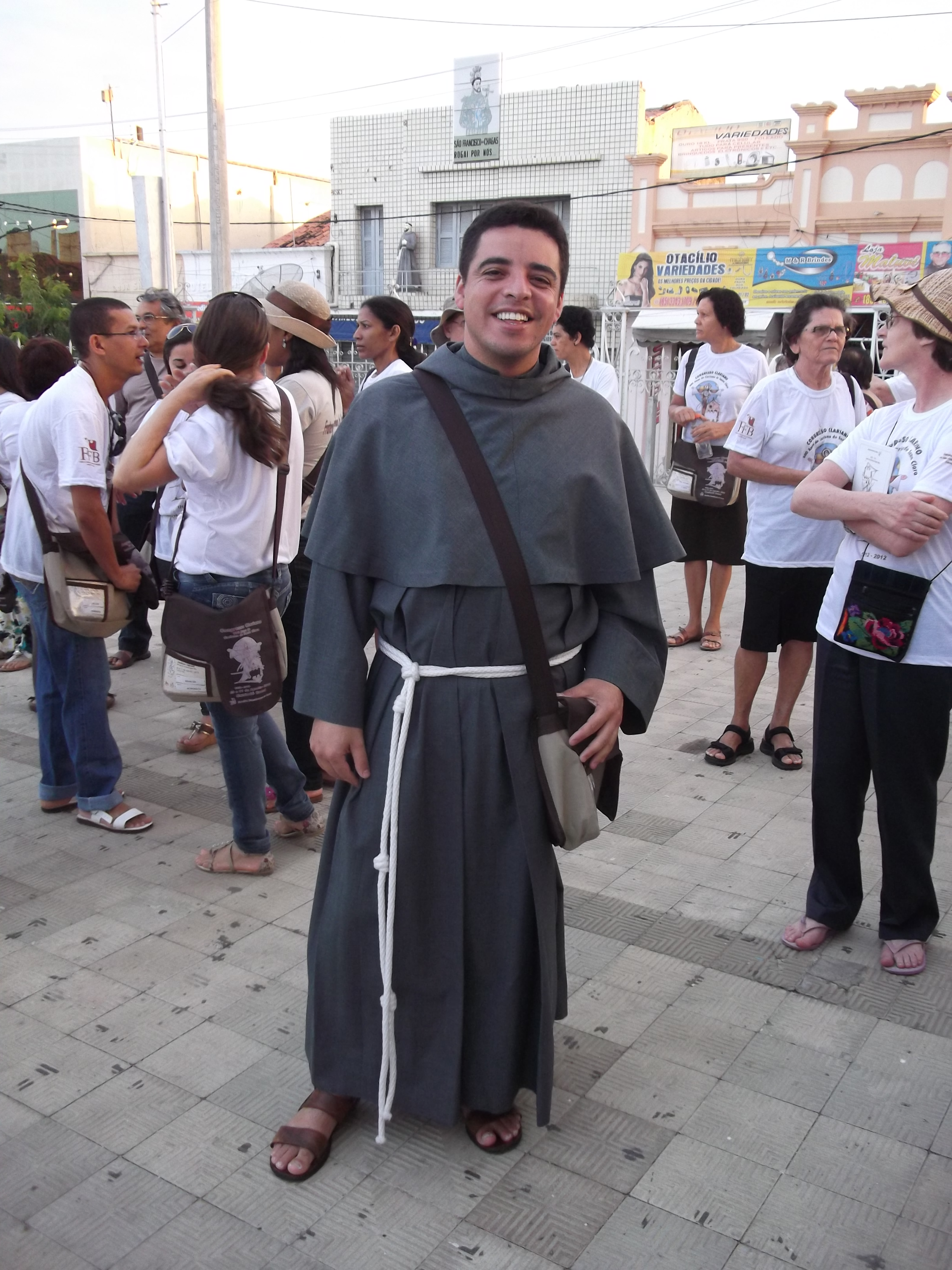
Conventual Franciscan friar, 2012

Statutes forbidding clergy from having wives were written beginning with the Council of Elvira (306) but these early statutes were not universal and were often defied by clerics and then retracted by hierarchy. The Synod of Gangra (345) condemned a false asceticism whereby worshipers boycotted celebrations presided over by married clergy. The Apostolic Constitutions (c. 400) excommunicated a priest or bishop who left his wife "under the pretense of piety" (Mansi, 1:51).

"A famous letter of Synesius of Cyrene (c. 414) is evidence both for the respecting of personal decision in the matter and for contemporary appreciation of celibacy. For priests and deacons clerical marriage continued to be in vogue".

"The Second Lateran Council (1139) seems to have enacted the first written law making sacred orders a direct impediment to marriage for the universal Church." Celibacy was first required of some clerics in 1123 at the First Lateran Council. Because clerics resisted it, the celibacy mandate was restated at the Second Lateran Council (1139) and the Council of Trent (1545–64). In places, coercion and enslavement of clerical wives and children was apparently involved in the enforcement of the law. "The earliest decree in which the children [of clerics] were declared to be slaves and never to be enfranchised [freed] seems to have been a canon of the Synod of Pavia in 1018. Similar penalties were promulgated against wives and concubines (see the Synod of Melfi, 1189 can. xii), who by the very fact of their unlawful connection with a subdeacon or clerk of higher rank became liable to be seized by the over-lord".

In the Roman Catholic Church, the Twelve Apostles are considered to have been the first priests and bishops of the Church. Some say the call to be eunuchs for the sake of Heaven in Matthew 19 was a call to be sexually continent and that this developed into celibacy for priests as the successors of the apostles. Others see the call to be sexually continent in Matthew 19 to be a caution for men who were too readily divorcing and remarrying.

The view of the Church is that celibacy is a reflection of life in Heaven, a source of detachment from the material world which aids in one's relationship with God. Celibacy is designed to "consecrate themselves with undivided heart to the Lord and to "the affairs of the Lord, they give themselves entirely to God and to men. It is a sign of this new life to the service of which the Church's minister is consecrated; accepted with a joyous heart celibacy radiantly proclaims the Reign of God." In contrast, Saint Peter, whom the Church considers its first Pope, was married given that he had a mother-in-law whom Christ healed (Matthew 8). But some argue that Peter was a widower, due to the fact that this passage does not mention his wife, and that his mother-in-law is the one who serves Christ and the apostles after she is healed. Furthermore, Peter himself states: "Then Peter spoke up, 'We have left everything to follow you!' 'Truly I tell you', Jesus replied, 'no one who has left home or brothers or sisters or mother or father or children or fields for me and the gospel will fail to receive a hundred times as much'" (Mark 10,28–30).

Usually, only celibate men are ordained as priests in the Latin Church. Married clergy who have converted from other Christian denominations can be ordained Roman Catholic priests without becoming celibate. Priestly celibacy is not doctrine of the Church (such as the belief in the Assumption of Mary) but a matter of discipline, like the use of the vernacular (local) language in Mass or Lenten fasting and abstinence. As such, it can theoretically change at any time though it still must be obeyed by Catholics until the change were to take place. The Eastern Catholic Churches ordain both celibate and married men. However, in both the East and the West, bishops are chosen from among those who are celibate. In Ireland, several priests have fathered children, the two most prominent being bishop Eamonn Casey and Michael Cleary.

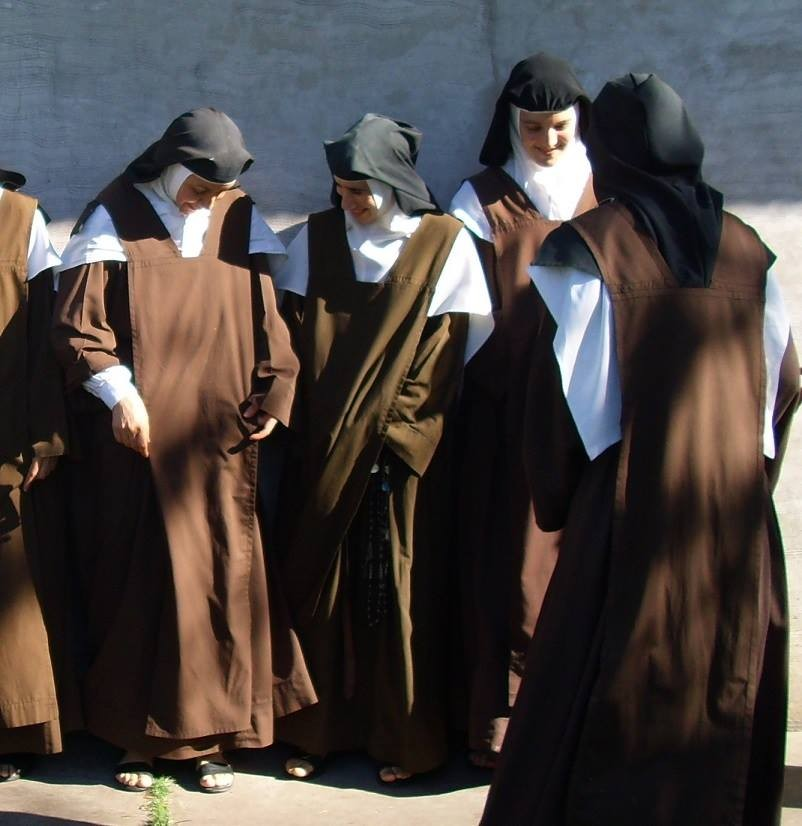
Discalced Carmelites from Argentina, 2013

The classical heritage flourished throughout the Middle Ages in both the Byzantine Greek East and the Latin West. When discerning the population of Christendom in medieval Europe during the Middle Ages, Will Durant, referring to Plato's ideal community, stated on the oratores (clergy):

"The clergy, like Plato's guardians, were placed in authority not by the suffrages of the people, but by their talent as shown in ecclesiastical studies and administration, by their disposition to a life of meditation and simplicity, and (perhaps it should be added) by the influence of their relatives with the powers of state and church. In the latter half of the period in which they ruled [AD 800 onwards], the clergy were as free from family cares as even Plato could desire; and in some cases it would seem they enjoyed no little of the reproductive freedom accorded to the guardians. Celibacy was part of the psychological structure of the power of the clergy; for on the one hand they were unimpeded by the narrowing egoism of the family, and on the other their apparent superiority to the call of the flesh added to the awe in which lay sinners held them and to the readiness of these sinners to bare their lives in the confessional."

With respect to clerical celibacy, Richard P. O'Brien stated in 1995, that in his opinion, "greater understanding of human psychology has led to questions regarding the impact of celibacy on the human development of the clergy. The realization that many non-European countries view celibacy negatively has prompted questions concerning the value of retaining celibacy as an absolute and universal requirement for ordained ministry in the Roman Catholic Church".

=== Celibate homosexual Christians ===
Some homosexual Christians choose to be celibate following their denomination's teachings on homosexuality.

In 2014, the American Association of Christian Counselors amended its code of ethics to eliminate the promotion of conversion therapy for homosexuals and encouraged them to be celibate instead.

== Hinduism ==
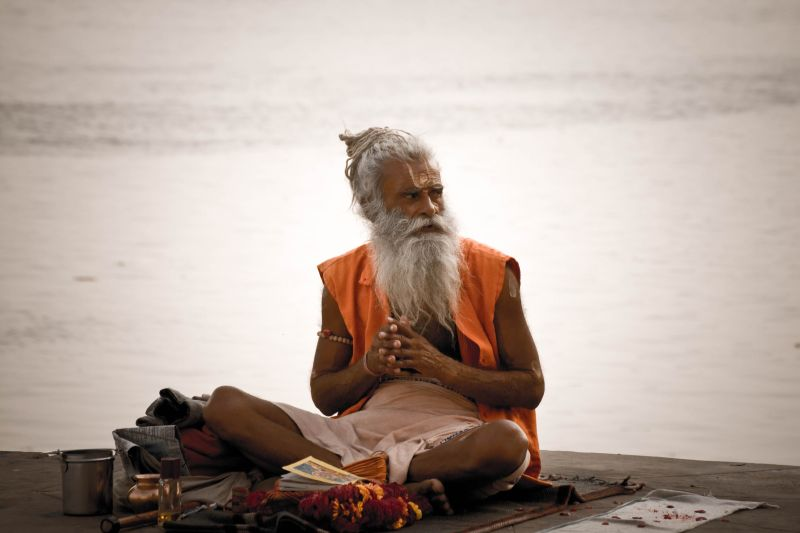
A sadhu by the Ghats on the Ganges, Varanasi, 2008

In Hinduism, celibacy is usually associated with the sadhus ("holy men"), ascetics who withdraw from society and renounce all worldly ties. Celibacy, termed brahmacharya in Vedic scripture, is the fourth of the yamas and the word literally translated means "dedicated to the Divinity of Life". The word is often used in yogic practice to refer to celibacy or denying pleasure, but this is only a small part of what brahmacharya represents. The purpose of practicing brahmacharya is to keep a person focused on the purpose in life, the things that instill a feeling of peace and contentment. It is also used to cultivate occult powers and many supernatural feats, called siddhi.

In the religious movement of Brahma Kumaris, celibacy is also promoted for peace and to defeat power of lust.

== Islam ==
Islamic attitudes toward celibacy have been complex. Muhammad denounced it; however, some Sufi orders embrace it. Islam does not promote celibacy; rather, it condemns premarital sex and extramarital sex. In fact, according to Islam, marriage enables one to attain the highest form of righteousness within this sacred spiritual bond but the Qur'an does not state it as an obligation. The Qur'an (Q57:27) states, "But the Monasticism which they (who followed Jesus) invented for themselves, We did not prescribe for them but only to please God therewith, but that they did not observe it with the right observance." Therefore, religion is clearly not a reason to stay unmarried although people are allowed to live their lives however they are comfortable; but relationships and sex outside of marriage, let alone forced marriage, is definitely a sin, "Oh you who believe! You are forbidden to inherit women against their will" (Q4:19). In addition, marriage partners can be distractions from practicing religion at the same time, "Your mates and children are only a trial for you" (Q64:15) however that still does not mean Islam does not encourage people who have sexual desires and are willing to marry. Anyone who does not (intend to) get married in this life can always do it in the Hereafter instead.

Several Qur'an verses describe Hoor al-Ayn (Companions of Paradise for male believers) who are beautiful, large, dark eyes, and pure skin, typically translated as "like hidden pearls" or "full-breasted companions of equal age." Surah An-Naba (78:33). Therefore, sensuality is part of Paradise for Islam.

Celibacy appears as a peculiarity among some Sufis.

Celibacy was practiced by women saints in Sufism. Celibacy was debated along with women's roles in Sufism in medieval times.

Celibacy, poverty, meditation, and mysticism within an ascetic context along with worship centered around saints' tombs were promoted by the Qadiri Sufi order among Hui Muslims in China. In China, unlike other Muslim sects, the leaders (Shaikhs) of the Qadiriyya Sufi order are celibate. Unlike other Sufi orders in China, the leadership within the order is not a hereditary position, rather, one of the disciples of the celibate Shaikh is chosen by the Shaikh to succeed him. The 92-year-old celibate Shaikh Yang Shijun was the leader of the Qadiriya order in China as of 1998.

Celibacy is practiced by Haydariya Sufi dervishes.

== Zoroastrianism ==
Zoroastrian text Videvdad (4:47) praises a married man by saying:

[T]he man who has a wife is far above him who lives in continence

== Meher Baba ==
The spiritual teacher Meher Baba stated that "[F]or the [spiritual] aspirant a life of strict celibacy is preferable to married life, if restraint comes to him easily without undue sense of self-repression. Such restraint is difficult for most persons and sometimes impossible, and for them married life is decidedly more helpful than a life of celibacy. For ordinary persons, married life is undoubtedly advisable unless they have a special aptitude for celibacy". Baba also asserted that "The value of celibacy lies in the habit of restraint and the sense of detachment and independence which it gives" and that "The aspirant must choose one of the two courses which are open to him. He must take to the life of celibacy or to the married life, and he must avoid at all costs a cheap compromise between the two. Promiscuity in sex gratification is bound to land the aspirant in a most pitiful and dangerous chaos of ungovernable lust."

== Ancient Greece and Rome ==
In Sparta and many other Greek cities, failure to marry was grounds for loss of citizenship, and could be prosecuted as a crime. Both Cicero and Dionysius of Halicarnassus stated that Roman law forbade celibacy. There are no records of such a prosecution, nor is the Roman punishment for refusing to marry known.

Pythagoreanism was the system of esoteric and metaphysical beliefs held by Pythagoras and his followers. Pythagorean thinking was dominated by a profoundly mystical view of the world. The Pythagorean code further restricted his members from eating meat, fish, and beans which they practised for religious, ethical and ascetic reasons, in particular the idea of metempsychosis – the transmigration of souls into the bodies of other animals. "Pythagoras himself established a small community that set a premium on study, vegetarianism, and sexual restraint or abstinence. Later philosophers believed that celibacy would be conducive to the detachment and equilibrium required by the philosopher's calling."

== The Balkans ==
The tradition of sworn virgins developed out of the Kanuni i Lekë Dukagjinit (English: The Code of Lekë Dukagjini, or simply the Kanun). The Kanun is not a religious document – many groups follow this code, including Roman Catholics, the Albanian Orthodox, and Muslims.

Women who become sworn virgins make a vow of celibacy, and are allowed to take on the social role of men: inheriting land, wearing male clothing, etc.

== Political contexts ==
During the May Fourth Movement in China, pledges of celibacy were a means through which participants resisted traditional marriage and devoted themselves to revolutionary causes.

== See also ==
- Abstinence in Judaism
- Feminism and celibacy

== Bibliography ==
- Heid, Stefan (2000). Celibacy in the Early Church: The Beginnings of a Discipline of Obligatory Continence for Clerics in East and West. Michael J. Miller (transl. from German). San Francisco: Ignatius Press. p. 376. ISBN 0-89870-800-1.
- Donald Cozzens (2006). Freeing Celibacy. Collegeville, Minn.: Liturgical Press.
- Brown, Gabrielle (1980). The New Celibacy: Why More Men and Women Are Abstaining from Sex—and Enjoying It. New York: McGraw-Hill. ISBN 0-07-008430-0.
- Rafael Domingo (2020): "Why Does the Catholic Church Insist on Celibacy?" by Rafael Domingo
