= Al-Hadid =

57th chapter of the Quran

Surah 57 of the Quran
الحديد Al-Ḥadīd The Iron
- Qira'ah; English text
- Classification: Medinan
- Position: Juzʼ 27
- Hizb no.: 54
- No. of verses: 29
- No. of Rukus: 4
- No. of words: 575
- No. of letters: 2475

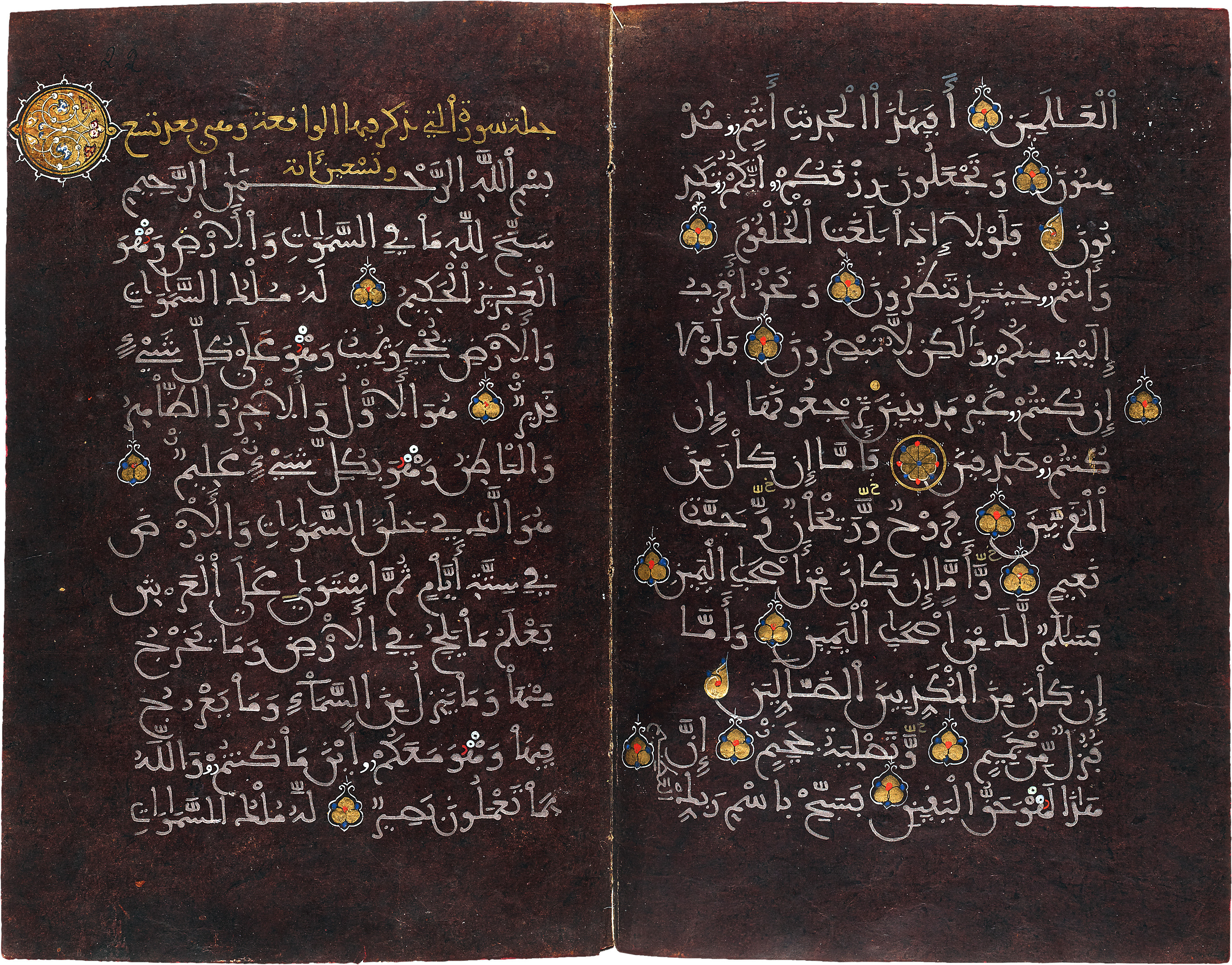
Double page from the Qur'an manuscript endowed to the Kasbah Mosque by sultan Abu Faris Abd al-Aziz II in March 1405, with end of the chapter 56 and beginning of the chapter 57 (left). Bibliothèque nationale de France

Al-Ḥadīd (English: Iron; Arabic: الحديد) is the 57th chapter (sūrah) of the Quran with 29 verses. The chapter takes its name from that word which appears in the 25th verse. This is an Al-Musabbihat surah because it begins with the glorification of Allah. And then emphasize God's sovereignty and absolute power. It then addresses two issues: faith in God and His Messenger, and spending in the way of God.

Regarding the timing and contextual background of the revelation, it is a Medinan chapter, which means it is believed to have been revealed in Medina rather than Mecca.

== Summary ==
- 1-6 God ( Allah ) is omniscient and most powerful.
- 7-11 Muslims exhorted to give alms and help the Prophet's mission
- 12-14 The wise and the foolish in the Judgment Day
- 15-17 True believers admonished to submit humbly to God
- 18 God will reward the faithful but will punish the wicked
- 19-20 The present life a vain show
- 21 Men exhorted to seek the life to come
- 22-23 All things recorded in God's book of decrees
- 24 God hateth proud and covetous persons (therefore the defeat at Ohod)
- 25 Apostles sent to former nations
- 26-27 Noah, Abraham, the prophets, and Jesus, with the Gospel, sent
- 28-29 Christians exhorted to become Muslims

== Exegesis ==
In his tafsir (exegesis), Ma’ariful-Qur’an, Muhammad Shafi wrote: “It is recorded in Abu Dawud, Tirmidhi and Nasa’i that Sayyidna ‘Irbad Ibn Sariyah (may Allah be pleased with him) said that the Messenger of Allah (may peace be upon him) used to recite Al-Musabbihat before he went to sleep and said: ‘In them there is a verse that is more meritorious than a thousand verses’.

“The collective name of the series Al-Musabbihat refers to the following five Surahs: (1) Al-Hadid; (2) Al-Hashr; (3) As-Saff; (4) Al-Jumu’ah; and (5) At-Taghabun.

“Having cited this Hadith, Ibn Kathir says that the best verse referred to in Surah Al-Hadid is verse (3). (He is the First and the Last, and the Manifest and the Hidden, and He is All-knowing about everything . . . 57:3).

“Among the five Surahs, the first three namely Al-Hadid, Al-Hashr and As-Saff commence with the past perfect tense ‘sabbaha’ (purity has been proclaimed) whilst the last two, namely Al-Jumu’ah and At-Taghabun commence with the imperfect tense ‘yusabbihu’ (purity is proclaimed). This implies that the purity of Allah should be declared at all times, the past, the present and the future. [Mazhari]”

== Shia Islam ==
In Kitab al-Kafi, Imam Musa al-Kadhim was asked for the interpretation of ayat 57:11: "Who is it that would loan Allah a goodly loan so He will multiply it for him and he will have a noble reward?". He replied "this was revealed about payment to the Imams. One dirham paid to the Imam is greater in weight than the mountain of Uhud and the reward is greater than two million dirhams paid for other charities." Another narration states it is the "good" towards the Imam during a government of mischief.
