= Medinan surah =

Chapters of the Quran

A Medinan surah (Arabic: سورة مدنية, romanized: Surah Madaniyah) of the Quran is one that was revealed at Medina after Muhammad's hijrah from Mecca. They are the latest 28 Surahs. The community was larger and more developed, in contrast to its minority position in Mecca.

The Medinan Surahs occur mostly at the beginning and in the middle of the Qur'an (but are said to be the last revealed surahs chronologically), and typically have more and longer ayat (verses). Due to the new circumstances of the early Muslim community in Medina, these surahs more often deal with details of moral principles, legislation, warfare (as in Surah 2, al-Baqara), and principles for constituting the community. They also refer more often to the community with "O people!" and at times directly address Muhammad or speak of him as "an agent acting in combination with the divine persona: 'God and his messenger' (Q 33:22)".

The division of surahs into 'Meccan surahs' and 'Medinan surahs' is primarily a consequence of stylistic and thematic considerations, which Theodor Noldeke used to develop his famous chronology of the Qur'anic suras. Classification of the surahs into these periods is based upon factors such as the length of the verse and the presence or absence of certain key concepts or word (e.g. al-Rahman as name of God).

== Characteristics of Medinan surahs ==
Following are some of the stylistic and subject characteristics of Medinan Surahs:

1. Mention of 'Jihad' and detailing on its rulings.
2. Details of Islamic jurisprudence and legal system as well as laws governing family, money transaction, international law, and acts of worship.
3. Mention of 'Munafiq' and dealing with hypocrites.
4. Any verse that starts with يا أيها للذين آمنوا O you who believe.
5. Discussion in regards to the People of the Book.

== The Medinan phase ==
The Medinan phase lasted approximately 10 years. The phase began from Muhammad's hijrah to Medina; and ended with the death of Muhammad. While the themes of the Meccan surahs remain, the Muslims growing into more of a community and the formation of Ummah, now is clear.

== Chronological order of Medinan surahs ==
The order of the 28 surahs, is as follows:

Order	Sura Name	Number	Note
87	Al-Baqara	2	Except v. 281 from Mina at the time of the Last Hajj
88	Al-Anfaal	8	Except v. 30-36 from Mecca
89	Aal-i-Imraan	3	
90	Al-Ahzaab	33	
91	Al-Mumtahana	60	
92	An-Nisaa	4	
93	Az-Zalzala	99	
94	Al-Hadid	57	
95	Muhammad	47	Except v. 13, revealed during the Prophet's Hijrah
96	Ar-Ra'd	13	
97	Ar-Rahmaan	55	
98	Al-Insaan	76	
99	At-Talaaq	65	
100	Al-Bayyina	98	
101	Al-Hashr	59	
102	An-Noor	24	
103	Al-Hajj	22	Except v. 52-55, revealed between Mecca and Medina
104	Al-Munaafiqoon	63	
105	Al-Mujaadila	58	
106	Al-Hujuraat	49	
107	At-Tahrim	66	
108	At-Taghaabun	64	
109	As-Saff	61	
110	Al-Jumu'a	62	
111	Al-Fath	48	Revealed while returning from Hudaybiyya
112	Al-Maaida	5	Except v. 3, revealed at Arafat on Last Hajj
113	At-Tawba	9	Except v. 128-129, the last two verses, from Mecca
114	An-Nasr	110	Revealed at Mina on Last Hajj, but regarded as Medinan sura
Source(s)			

== See also ==
- Meccan surah
- List of chapters in the Quran
