= Q64 =

Q64 may refer to:

- Q64 (New York City bus)
- At-Taghabun, a surah of the Quran
- French submarine Papin
