= Al-Ghashiyah =

88th chapter of the Qur'an

Surah 88 of the Quran
الغاشية Al-Ghāshiyah The Overwhelming
- Qira'ah; English text
- Classification: Meccan
- Position: Juzʼ 30
- No. of verses: 26
- No. of Sajdahs: (none)
- No. of words: 92
- No. of letters: 382

Al-Ghāshiyah (Arabic: الغاشية, "The Overwhelming", "The Pall") is the 88th chapter (surah) of the Qur'an, with 26 ayat or verses. The surah's topics are Paradise, Hell and the miracle of the creation of all things by God.

== Summary ==
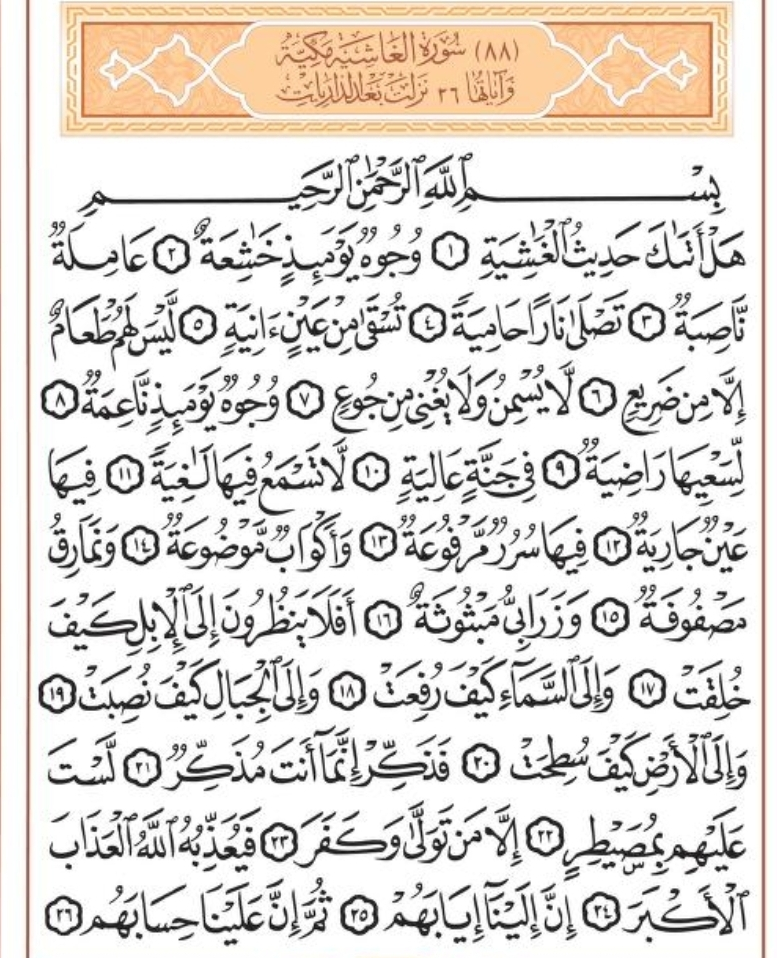
Surah Al-Ghashiyah

This surah refers to three broad-ranging topics. First, God describes the difference between good and evil paths that an individual can take and the consequence of each path. God then clarifies their destiny and describes what hell would be like for the non-believers. The second theme mentions the creations God has made, referring to the sky, the earth, and the mountains. Lastly, in verses 21–22, God gives a direct message to Muhammad and tells him, "So remind, [O Muhammad]; you are only a reminder. You are not over them a controller."

== Ayat (verses) ==
- 1-3 The terrible day of judgment
- 4-7 Description of the torments of hell
- 8-16 The joyful state of the believers on the judgment-day
- 17-20 God manifests himself in his works
- 21-22 Muhammad only to warn, not to compel, the infidels
- 23-26 Everyone's deeds will be accounted and God will himself punish the unbelievers

== Hadith ==
- Al-Dahhak b. Qais asked al-Nu'man b. Bashir: What did the Messenger of Allah (ﷺ) recite on Friday after reciting the Surah Al-Jumua (62). He replied: He used to recite, "Had the story of overwhelming event reached you?" (Al-Ghashiyah).
- Samra ibn Jundab narrated that: The Messenger of Allah (ﷺ) used to recite in the Friday prayer: "Glorify the name of your most high Lord" (Surah 87) and Has the story of the overwhelming event reached you? (Al-Ghashiyah).
- Abu Bakr bin An-Nadr said: We were in At-Taff with Anas, and he led them in praying Zuhr. When he had finished, he said: ''I prayed Zuhr with the Messenger of Allah (ﷺ) and he recited two surahs for us in the two rak'ahs: 'Glorify the Name of your Lord, the Most High' (Quran 87) and 'Has there come to you the narration of the overwhelming?"' (Al-Ghashiyah).
- It was narrated from Ibn ‘Abbas that: The Prophet (ﷺ) used to recite in the Eid prayers ''Glorify the Name of your Lord, the Most High." (Surah 87) and "Has there come to you the narration of the overwhelming?" (Al-Ghashiyah).
- It was narrated from al-Nu'man b. Bashir that: The Messenger of Allah (ﷺ) used to recite on the two Eid prayers and on Jumu'ah: "Glorify the Name of Your Lord, the Most High" (Surah 87) and "Has there come to you the narration of The Overwhelming?" (Al-Ghashiyah) Sometimes the two (Eid and Jumu'ah) occurred on the same day, and he would recite them (these two Surahs).
