= Hadith of Persian Men =

Report about Iran in Islamic tradition

The Hadith of Persian Men (Persian: حدیث مردان پارسی) refers to a Hadith, an Islamic "report", "account," or "narrative" about the people of Iran (Persia).

== Definition ==
The central Hadith of Persian Men is understood to concern three concepts: Iman (faith), Deen (Religion) and Ilm (knowledge).

== Context ==
The Hadith of Persian Men has been narrated in different hadith compilations, including the following:

=== Bukhari's Sahih ===
Muhammad al-Bukhari provided the hadith:

Narrated Abu Huraira: ...when the Verse, "And if you (arab in madinah) turn away (from the Truth) He shall replace you (arab in madinah) with another people, then they will not be (stingy) like you." (62:3) was recited by the Prophet, I said, "Who are they, O Allah's Apostle?" The Prophet did not reply till I repeated my question thrice. At that time, Salman al-Farsi was with us. So Allah's Apostle put his hand on Salman, saying: "Even if Faith were at (the place of) Ath-Thuraiya (Pleiades, the highest star), then some man or men from these people (i.e. Salman's folk) would attain it."

Directly following this, is the hadith:

Narrated Abu Huraira: The Prophet said, "Then some men from these people would attain it."

=== Muslim's Sahih ===
Ibn al-Hajjaj narrates this hadith in the chapter: "The merits of the people of Persia":

Abu Huraira reported Allah's Messenger (may peace be upon him) as saying: "If the din were at the Pleiades, even then a person from Persia would have taken hold of it, or one amongst the Persian descent would have surely found it".

Then follows the consequent hadith:

Abu Huraira reported: We were sitting in the company of Allah's Apostle (may peace be upon him) that Sura al-Jumu'a was revealed to him and when he recited (these words) : "Others from amongst them who have not yet joined them." A person amongst them (those who were sitting there) said: "Allah's Messenger!" But Allah's Apostle (may peace be upon him) made no reply, until he questioned him once, twice or thrice. And there was amongst us Salman the Persian. The Apostle of Allah (may peace be upon him) placed his hand on Salman and then said: "Even if faith were near the Pleiades, a man from amongst these would surely find it".

== Terminology ==
=== Ath-Thuraiya ===
The term: "Ath-Thuraiya" is used in this Hadith uniquely. The term is believed to convey an exaggerated expression of remoteness.

=== Persia ===
The contextual meaning of "Persia/Iran" may be interpreted by contemporary readers as modern Iran; however, a complete comprehension of the Hadith requires an understanding of the Hadith historicity context and definitions of its terminology regarding what was meant by "Persia". Possibilities include:

- Persian speakers – Some scholars believe that the word "Persia" does not refer to a physical origin; rather, it is attributed to those whose mother tongue is Persian.
- Shiraz or Persepolis and its surroundings
