= Q87 =

Q87 might be:

- Al-Ala, the 87th surah of the Quran
- French submarine Curie (Q87)
- Intel Q87, an Intel Series 8 chipset
