= Al-Zalzalah =

99th chapter of the Qur'an

Surah 99 of the Quran
الزلزلة Al-Zalzalah The Earthquake
- Qira'ah; English text
- Classification: Medinan^{(contested)}
- Position: Juzʼ 30
- No. of verses: 8
- No. of words: 36
- No. of letters: 156

Al-Zalzalah
Recitation of Al-Zalzalah in mujawwad.

Al-Zalzalah (Arabic: الزلزلة, al-zalzalah, meaning: "The Earthquake") is the 99th chapter (surah) of the Qur'an, composed of 8 ayat or verses. Although it is usually classified as a Medinan surah, the period during which the surah was revealed is not unanimously agreed upon by Qur'anic exegetes. The topic is a coming Day of Judgement for humans.

== Summary ==
- 1-5 The judgment-day shall be ushered in by a final earthquake
- 6-8 Men shall be judged according to their deeds

The surah begins by describing how on the Day of Judgment, the Earth will give off a terrible earthquake and "throw up her burdens". Through the inspiration of God, the Earth will bear witness to the actions of men it has witnessed. According to Michael Sells, the earth opening up and bearing forth her secrets in this sura is indicative of a birth metaphor. The earth al-'Ard in the feminine gender bears forth of how her lord revealed the final secret to her. Human beings will then realize that the moment of accountability has arrived. This meticulous accountability will reflect good and evil deeds that might have seemed insignificant at the time.

According to a narration from Abu Hurairah, the Prophet explained that on the Day of Judgment, the earth will testify to all the deeds that men and women have done upon it, stating what day and by whom each deed was done. Anas also narrated that the Prophet said: The earth will inform on the Day of Judgment about all the deeds that were done on it. Then he recited the fourth and fifth verses of Surah Zalzal. It is also reported from Ali ibn Abi Talib that, after distributing the money of the public treasury (Bayt al-Mal) among the poor, he prayed two rak'ahs prayer and said: "O Earth, you will have to testify that I spent the wealth I took from you in the path of truth."

The two concluding verses state that all men will be sorted out into groups according to their deeds, and they will see the consequence of everything they have done; every atom's weight of good or evil:

That day mankind will issue forth in scattered groups to be shown their deeds.

And whoso doeth good an atom's weight will see it then,

And whoso doeth ill an atom's weight will see it then.

— The Qur'an, verses 99:6-8 (translated by Marmaduke Pickthall)

== Text ==
بِسْمِ ٱللَّهِ ٱلرَّحْمَـٰنِ ٱلرَّحِيمِ
In the name of Allah, the Most Gracious, the Most Merciful

1. إِذَا زُلْزِلَتِ ٱلْأَرْضُ زِلْزَالَهَا
When the earth is shaken with its [final] earthquake

2. وَأَخْرَجَتِ ٱلْأَرْضُ أَثْقَالَهَا
And the earth discharges its burdens

3. وَقَالَ ٱلْإِنسَـٰنُ مَا لَهَا
And man says,"What is [wrong] with it?" -

4. يَوْمَئِذٍ تُحَدِّثُ أَخْبَارَهَا
That Day, it will report its news

5. بِأَنَّ رَبَّكَ أَوْحَىٰ لَهَا
Because your Lord has inspired [i.e., commanded] it.

6. يَوْمَئِذٍ يَصْدُرُ ٱلنَّاسُ أَشْتَاتًا لِّيُرَوْا۟ أَعْمَـٰلَهُمْ
That Day, the people will depart separated [into categories] to be shown [the result of] their deeds.

7. فَمَن يَعْمَلْ مِثْقَالَ ذَرَّةٍ خَيْرًا يَرَهُۥ
So whoever does an atom's weight of good will see it,

8.وَمَن يَعْمَلْ مِثْقَالَ ذَرَّةٍ شَرًّا يَرَهُۥ
And whoever does an atom's weight of evil will see it.
