= Al-Ala =

87th chapter of the Qur'an

Surah 87 of the Quran
الأعلى Al-Aʻlā The Most High
- Qira'ah; English text
- Classification: Meccan
- Other names: Glory to Your Lord in the Highest, The All-Highest
- Position: Juzʼ 30
- No. of verses: 19
- No. of words: 72
- No. of letters: 296

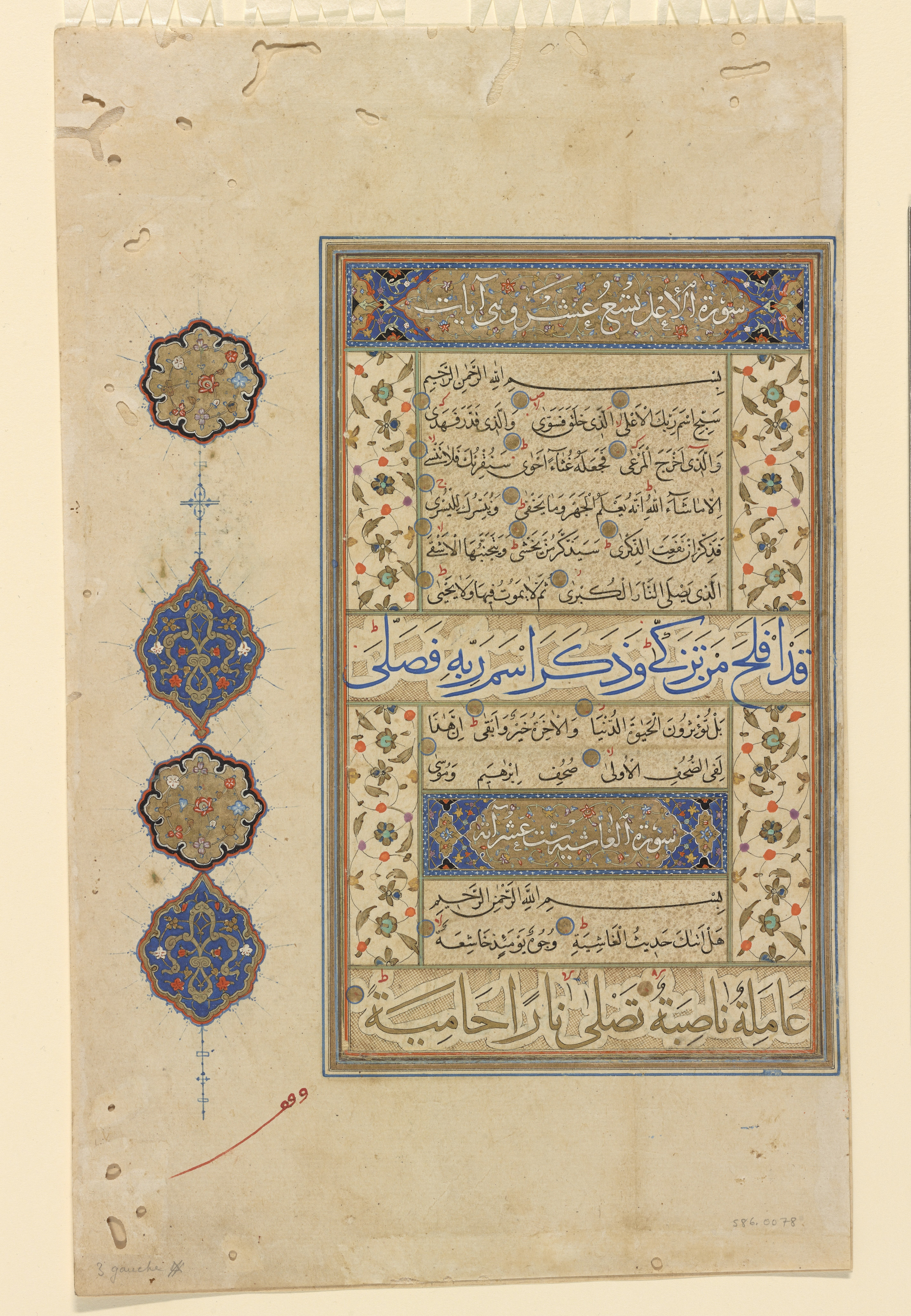
Page from an Ottoman Qur'an with Al-Ala and the start of the next surah.

Al-Aʻlā (Arabic: الأعلى, lit. 'The Most High, Glory To Your Lord In The Highest') is the eighty-seventh chapter (surah) of the Qur'an, with 19 ayat or verses.

Al-A'la describes the Islamic view of existence, the Oneness of Allah, and Divine revelation, additionally mentioning rewards and punishments. Mankind often hides things from each other and from themselves as well. The sura reminds its readers that Allah knows the things that are declared and things that lie hidden. The final verse of this Sura affirms that a similar message was also revealed to Abraham and Moses in the scriptures. This sura is part of the series of Al-Musabbihat as it begins with the glorification of Allah. The first seven Āyāt (verses) were revealed during the first years of Makkan life.

One of the companions of Ali said that he prayed twenty consecutive nights behind him and he did not recite any Surah, except Surah A’la. Surat Al-A'lā is among the most recited suras in the Jummah and Witr prayers.

Regarding the timing and contextual background of the believed revelation (asbāb al-nuzūl), it is one of the earlier "Meccan surahs", which means that it is believed to have been revealed in Mecca, rather than later in Medina.

== Summary ==
- 1-5 God, the Most High, praised for his works
- 6-9 God promises to help Muhammad to proclaim the Quran
- 10-11 The God-fearing only shall be admonished
- 12-15 The wicked shall be punished, but the righteous shall be blessed
- 16-17 Men choose the present life rather than the life to come
- 18-19 The books of Abraham and Moses attest the Quran

== Hadith ==
- Ibn ‘Abbas (d.687) narrated: The Prophet recited in Witr: Glorify the Name of your Lord, the Most High (Al-Ala).
- Ibn ‘Abbas reported; when the prophet recited: "Glorify the name of thy Lord, the Most High."(Al-Ala) He would say: "Glory be to Allah, the most High".
- Samra ibn Jundab narrated that: The Messenger of Allah used to recite in the Friday prayer: "Glorify the name of your most high Lord" (Al-Ala) and Has the story of the overwhelming event reached you? (Al-Ghashiyah).
- It was narrated from Ibn ‘Abbas that the Prophet used to recite in the ‘Eid prayers "Glorify the Name of your Lord, the Most High." (Al-Ala) and “Has there come to you the narration of the overwhelming?” (Al-Ghashiyah).
- It was narrated from al-Nu'man b. Bashir that: The Messenger of Allah used to recite on the two Eid prayers and on Jumu'ah: "Glorify the Name of Your Lord, the Most High" (Al-Ala) and "Has there come to you the narration of The Overwhelming?"(Al-Ghashiyah) Sometimes the two ('Eid and Jumu'ah) occurred on the same day, and he would recite them (these two Surahs).
- It was narrated that Imran ibn Husain said: "The Prophet prayed Zuhr and a man behind him recited: Glorify the Name of your Lord, the Most High. When he had finished praying, he said: 'Who recited: Glorify the Name of your Lord, the Most High?" (Al-Ala) A man said: 'I did.' He said: 'I realized that some of you were disputing with me over it'".
- Abu Bakr bin An-Nadr said: "We were in At-Taff with Anas, and he led them in praying Zuhr. When he had finished, he said: 'I prayed Zuhr with the Messenger of Allah and he recited two surahs for us in the two rak'ahs: "Glorify the Name of your Lord, the Most High' (Al-Ala) and 'Has there come to you the narration of the over-whelming?'" (Al-Ghashiyah).
- It was narrated that Jabir said: "Muadh stood up and prayed Isha', and made it lengthy. The Prophet said: 'Do you want to cause hardship to the people, O Mu'adh; do you want to cause hardship to the people O Mu'adh? Why didn't you recite Glorify the Name of your Lord Most High (Al-Ala) or Ad-Dhuha or; When the heaven is cleft asunder?"
- Narrated Uqbah ibn Amir: “When the following was revealed: ‘So glorify the Name of your Lord, the Most Great’,[69:52] the Messenger of Allah said to us: ‘Say this in your Ruku’.’ And when the following was revealed: ‘Glorify the Name of your Lord, the Most High.’[87:1] the Messenger of Allah said to us: ‘Say this in your prostrations.’”
