= Al-Hashr, 6 =

Recitation of 59:6

This is a sub-article to Al-Hashr.

Al-Hashr, 6 is the sixth ayat of Chapter 59 of the Qur'an, and relates to the controversies of the land of Fadak.

== Overview ==
Surah Al-Hashr 59:6:

As for the gains Allah has turned over to His Messenger from them—you did not ˹even˺ spur on any horse or camel for such gains. But Allah gives authority to His messengers over whoever He wills. For Allah is Most Capable of everything.

Transliteration: Wama afaa Allahu AAalarasoolihi minhum fama awjaftum AAalayhi min khaylin walarikabin walakinna Allaha yusalliturusulahu AAala man yashao wallahuAAala kulli shay-in qadeer

Arabic: وَمَآ أَفَآءَ ٱللَّهُ عَلَىٰ رَسُولِهِۦ مِنْهُمْ فَمَآ أَوْجَفْتُمْ عَلَيْهِ مِنْ خَيْلٍۢ وَلَا رِكَابٍۢ وَلَـٰكِنَّ ٱللَّهَ يُسَلِّطُ رُسُلَهُۥ عَلَىٰ مَن يَشَآءُ ۚ وَٱللَّهُ عَلَىٰ كُلِّ شَىْءٍۢ قَدِيرٌۭ

== Exegesis ==
This verse is said to relate to the land of Fadak. The words translated as "restored", "afaa", is related to Fay:

Ghanimah is that property (or money), in which Muslims had worked to get it, while Fay is that property (or money), in which Muslims didn't have to ride the horses and camels.

=== Sunni view ===
Fakhr al-Din al-Razi, a 13th century Sunni Islamic scholar wrote that, "This verse was revealed with regard to Fadak, which the Prophet (s) acquired as it was conquered without any fighting.

Other Sunni tafsir that say Fadak was Fay property include:

- Tafsir al-Mazhari, p238
- Ruh al-Ma'ani, Tafsir Surah Hashr.
- Tafsir Muraghi, Tafsir Surah Hashr.
- Dur al-Manthur, Tafsir Surah Hashr.
- Tafsir Juwahir Tantawi, Tafseer Surah Hashr.

However, as opposed to all other Sunni historians, Shah Waliullah and Ibn Taymiyyah do not accept that Fadak was in possession of Muhammad.

Shibli Nomani, a 20th century Sunni Islamic scholar writes:

after the conquest of Syria and Iraq Omar addressed the companions, he declare on the basis of the Qur'an that the conquered territories were not the property of any man, but that they were a national trust, as has been discussed under Fay. However, from the verse of the Qur'an it appears that the lands of Fadak were the Holy Prophet's own property, and that Omar himself understood the verse to imply so: "What Allah has made this people (i.e. Bani Nadir) deliver to his Apostle, to conquest which you did not lead any camels or horses, but Allah empowers his Apostles over who, he pleases". On reading this verse Omar declared that the land was reserved for the Holy Prophet. The matter is mentioned in Sahih al Bukhari in detail in the chapters on Khums al Maghazi and al Mirath
