= Demolition of Masjid al-Dirar =

C. 630 CE event described in the Quran

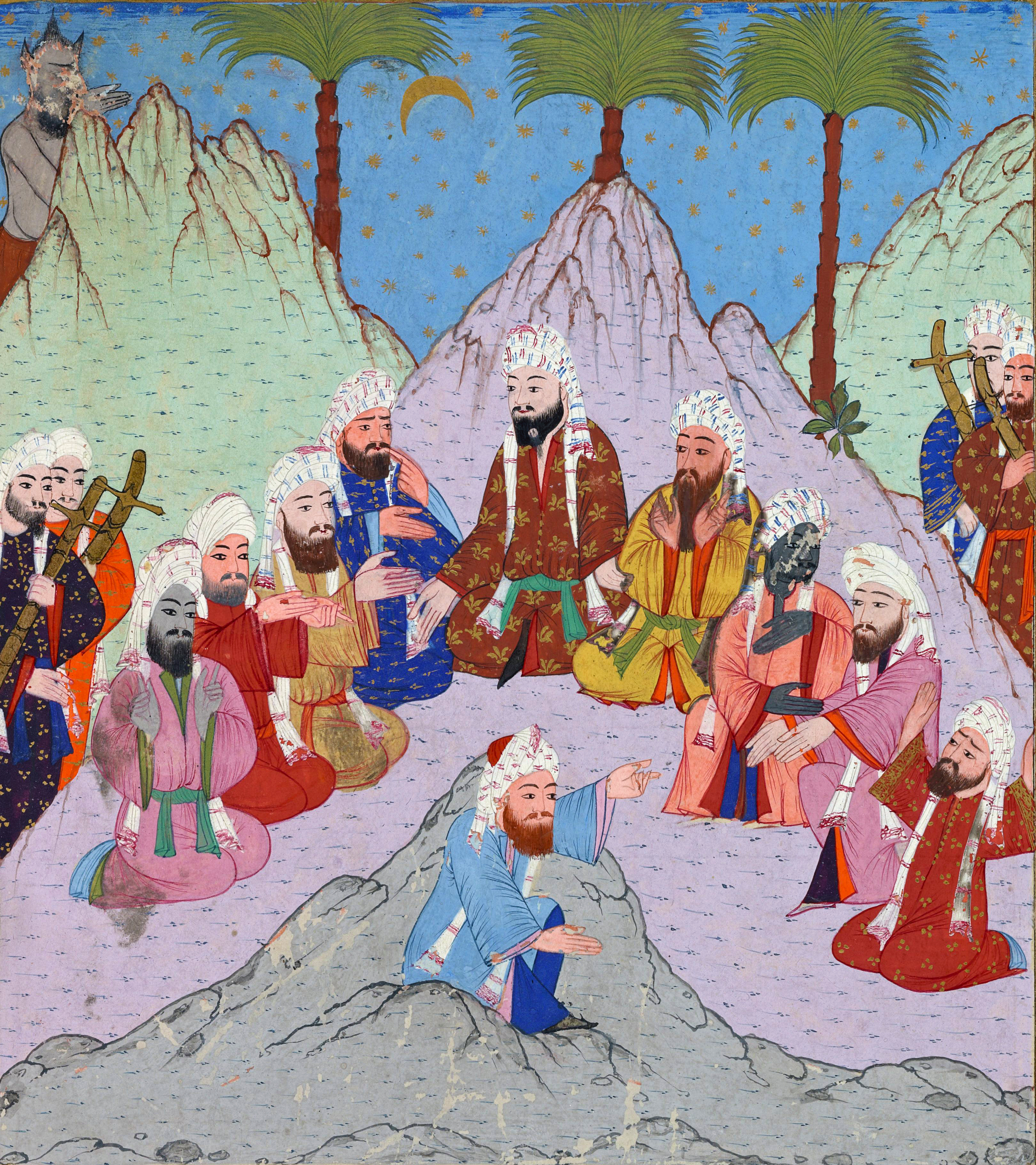
Islamic miniature depicting anti-Islamic zealot "the Monk" Abu ʿĀmir al-Rāhib and builder of the Mosque of Dissent spying on a meeting by the leaders of the Quraysh (Among them Umayya ibn Khalaf, Abu Sufyān, Khālid ibn al-Walīd, Amr ibn al-‘Āṣ) discussing the second pledge at al-Aqabah, being watched over by Iblis.

The demolition or burning of Masjid al-Dirar (Arabic: مسجد الضرار), or the Mosque of Dissent, is mentioned in the Qur'an. The Masjid al-Dirar was a mosque in Medina that was erected close to the Quba Mosque and which Muhammad initially approved of, but subsequently destroyed while returning from the Expedition to Tabuk, which occurred in October 630.)

In the account narrated by the majority of scholars, the mosque was built by twelve "hypocrites" (munafiqīn) on the commands of Abu ʿAmir al-Fasiq, a Christian who refused Islam and instead fought along with the Quraysh against the early Muslims in the Battle of Uhud on March 23, 625. Abu ʿAmir reportedly urged his men to establish a stronghold and prepare whatever they can of power and weapons as he promised and insinuated to them that he will lead an army, backed by Heraclius, to fight Muhammad and the early Muslims and defeat his message by expelling him from Medina. Ahmad ibn Yahya al-Baladhuri also relates that the men who built the al-Dirar mosque "for mischief and for infidelity and to disunite the Believers" refused to pray in Quba Mosque, claiming that it was built in a place where a donkey used to be tied up.

According to Muslim tradition, Muhammad was asked to lead prayer there but received a revelation, mentioned in Surah 9:107 and 110. In consequence of this, the mosque was destroyed by fire. Henceforth, it was known as the Mosque of Opposition.

== Accounts ==
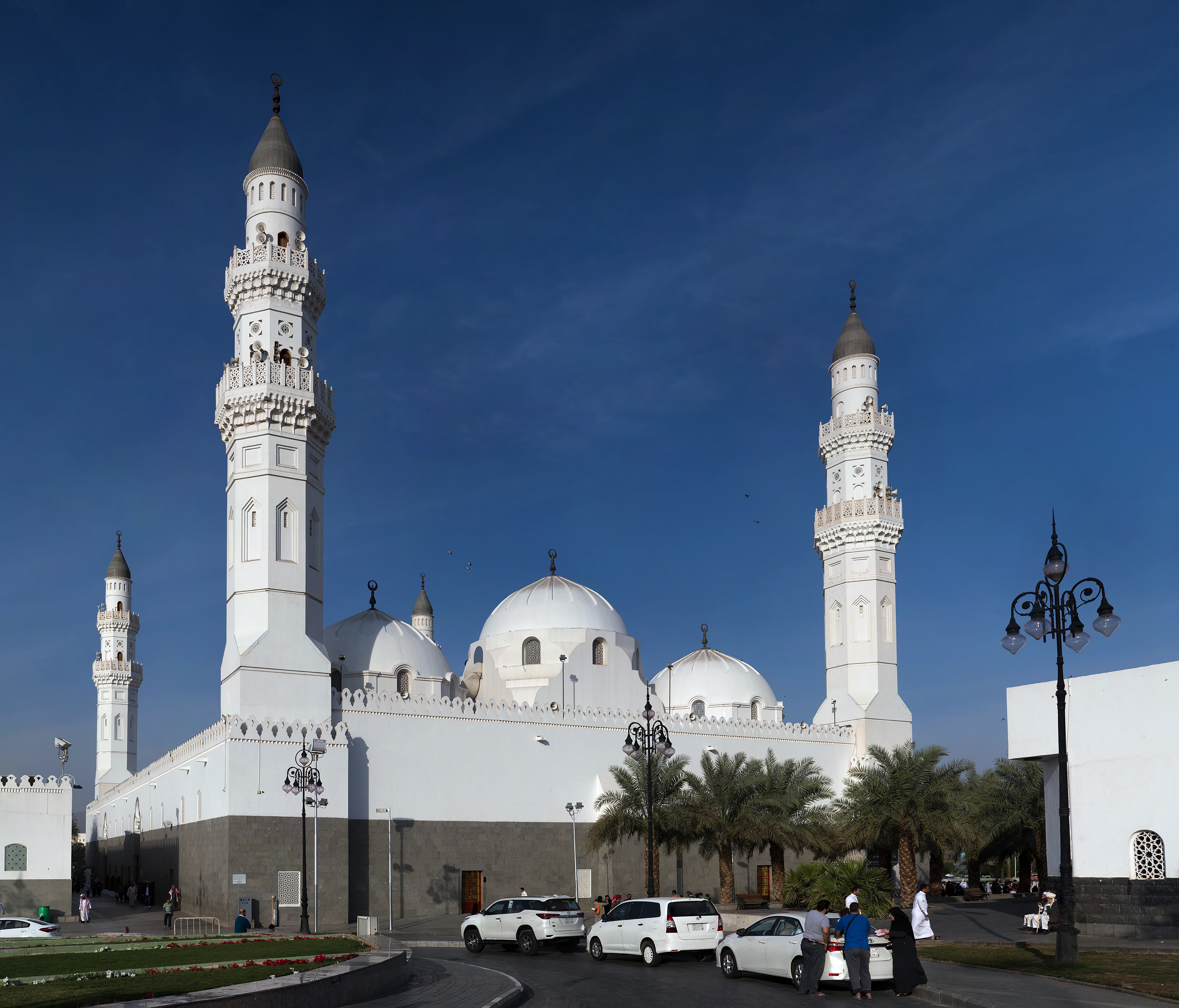
Quba Mosque.

Abu Amir al-Rahib was originally a Christian who disliked Muhammad, and reportedly fought in the Battle of Badr. He wanted him expelled from Medina and Islam eradicated. He also joined the Quraysh against the Muslims in the Battle of Uhud. The majority have stated that Abu Amir requested assistance from the Byzantines against Muhammad. Abd Allah ibn Ubayy, an enemy of Islam, was his nephew. Abu Amir died in year 9 or 10 Hijri era in the courtyard of Heraclius.

Al-Baladhuri also mentioned this. He said the Mosque was built by some men who refused to pray in Quba Mosque because it was built in a place where a donkey was tied up. Rather, they said they will build another mosque so that Abu Amir can lead the service in it. But Abu Amir did not convert to Islam; he left Medina and converted to Christianity. The Banu Amir built the Quba Mosque and Muhammad led the prayer in it, but their brother tribe, the Banu Ghan ibn Auf were jealous and also wanted Muhammad to pray in the Mosque, they also said that: "Abu Amir may pass here on his way from Syria, and lead us in prayer"

== Burning of Masjid al-Dirar ==
=== Details of the burning ===
When Muhammad was returning from Tabuk, the Muslims halted at Dhu Awan. Some Muslims constructed the mosque claiming it was for the sick and needy, but because of the information given to him, Muhammad knew that it was an opposition mosque, so he sent Muslim fighters to burn it down. The men entered the mosque and set fire to it.

=== Analysis and speculation about the burning ===
Isma'il Qurban Husayn (translator of Tabari, Volume 9, Last years of the prophet) speculated by saying in footnote 426, that the people were "probably" linked to those who wanted to kill Muhammad in the Battle of Tabuk, but Tabari himself did not make that claim.

William Muir, a Scottish orientalist, mentions his opinion that Muhammad believed the Mosque was built to create disunity among Muslims by drawing people away from another Mosque in Quba i.e. Masjid al-Quba, which was the first Mosque to be built by Muslims.

Muhammad ibn Abd al-Wahhab at-Tamimi mentioned in an abridged version of Ibn Qayyim Al-Jawziyya's biography of Muhammad (named Zad al-Ma'ad), that the people of the city watched as the mosque was burnt down, and he also used this event to provide teachings to justify his belief that burning down places of sin is permissible in Islam.

== Islamic sources ==
=== Primary sources ===
The event is mentioned in the Quran verse 9:107, the verse states:

And there are those who put up a mosque by way of mischief and infidelity - to disunite the Believers - and in preparation for one who warred against Allah and His Messenger aforetime. They will indeed swear that their intention is nothing but good; But Allah doth declare that they are certainly liars. ^{[Quran 9:107]}

The Muslim scholar Ibn Kathir's commentary on this verse is as follows:

(If we come back from our travel, Allah willing.) When the Messenger of Allah came back from Tabuk and was approximately one or two days away from Al-Madinah, Jibril came down to him with the news about Masjid Ad-Dirar and the disbelief and division between the believers, who were in Masjid Quba' (which was built on piety from the first day), that Masjid Ad-Dirar was meant to achieve. Therefore, the Messenger of Allah sent some people to Masjid Ad-Dirar to bring it down before he reached Al-Madinah. 'Ali bin Abi Talhah reported that Ibn 'Abbas said about this Ayah (9:107), "They are some people of the Ansar to whom Abu 'Amir said, 'Build a Masjid and prepare whatever you can of power and weapons, for I am headed towards Caesar, emperor of Rome, to bring Roman soldiers with whom I will expel Muhammad and his companions.' When they built their Masjid, they went to the Prophet and said to him, "We finished building our Masjid and we would like you to pray in it and invoke Allah for us for His blessings [Tafsir ibn Kathir on 9:107].

The event is mentioned by the Muslim jurist Tabari as follows:

"The Messenger of God proceeded until he halted in Dhu Awan, a town an hour’s daytime journey from Medina. The people who had built the Mosque of Dissent (masjid al-dirar) had come to him while he was preparing for Tabuk saying, 'O Messenger of God, we have built a mosque for the sick and needy and for rainy and cold nights, and we would like you to visit us and pray for us in it.' [The Prophet] said that he was on the verge of traveling, and he was preoccupied, or words to that effect, and that when he returned, God willing, he would come to them and pray for them in it. When he stopped in Dhu Awan, news of the mosque came to him, and he summoned Malik b. al-Dukhshum, a brother of the Banu Salim b. 'Awf, and Ma’n b. 'Adi, or his brother 'Asim b. 'Adi, brothers of the Banu al-'Ajlan, and said, "Go to this mosque whose owners are unjust people and destroy and burn it". They went out briskly until they came to the Banu Salim b. 'Awf who were Malik b. al-Dukhshum’s clan. Malik said to Ma’n, "Wait for me until I bring fire from my people." He went to his kinsfolk and took a palm branch and lighted it. Then both of them ran until they entered the mosque, its people inside, set fire to it and destroyed it and the people dispersed. Concerning this, it was revealed in the Quran... [Tabari, Volume 9, The last Years of the Prophet, pp. 60–61]
