= Saeid Sobhani =

Iranian scholar and philosopher (born 1963)

Ayatollah Saeid Sobhani
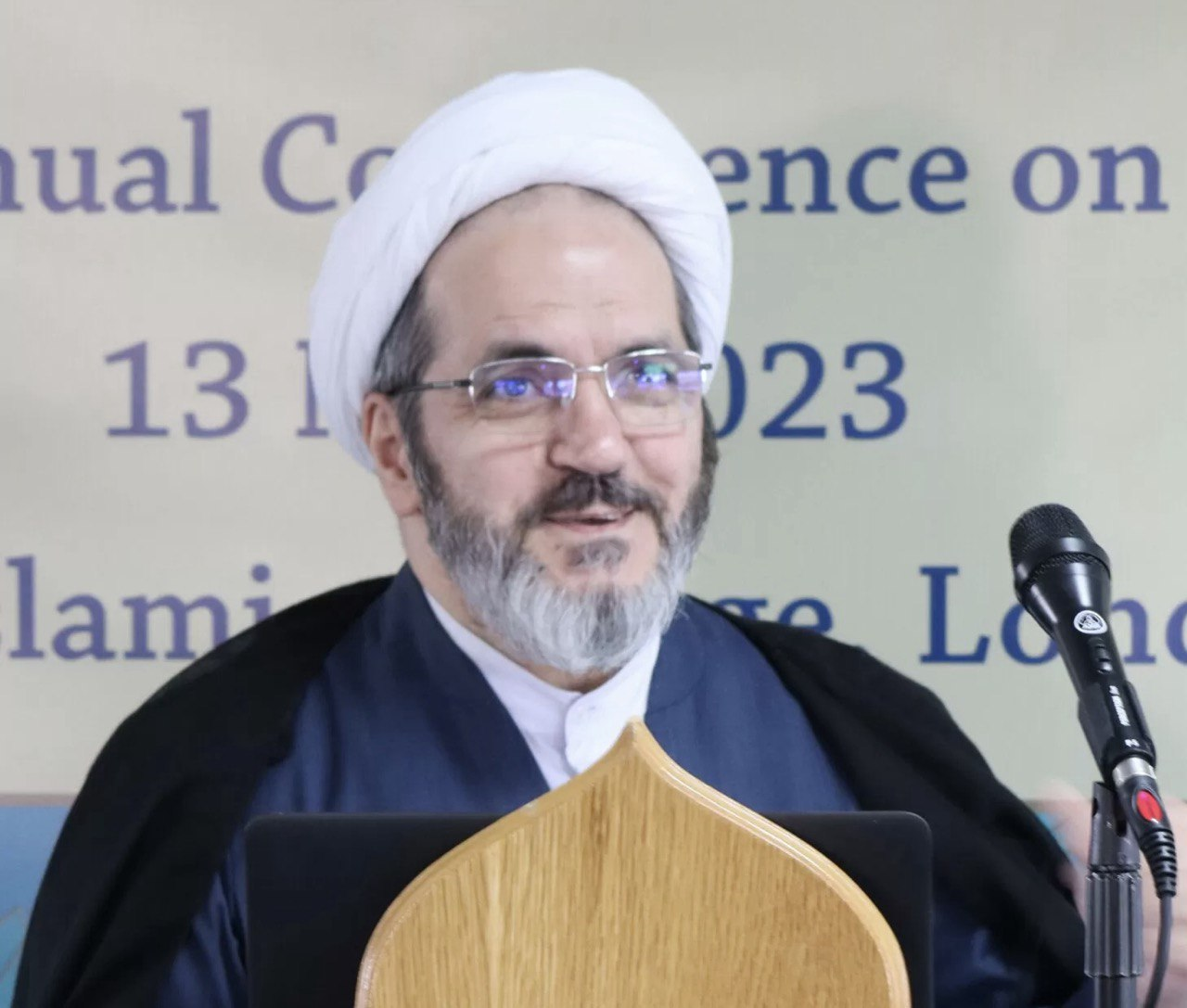
- Born: 1963 (age 62–63); Qom, Iran
- Occupation: Philosopher
- Father: Ja'far Sobhani
- Website: https://saeidsobhani.com/

Ayatollah Saeid Sobhani is a high-ranking Shi'i scholar, philosopher, theologian, jurisprudent and Quranic exegete. His scholarly endeavors include the authorship of numerous books and articles, which span a diverse array of subjects, reflecting his extensive knowledge and intellectual depth.

== Biography ==
Ayatollah Saeid Sobhani was born in 1963 in Qom, into a prominent family deeply rooted in religious scholarship. His early education combined both formal schooling and spiritual instruction under the mentorship of his father, Grand Ayatollah Ja'far Sobhani.

From 1982 to 2002, he studied under the tutelage of distinguished scholars in Qom, mastering various disciplines including Arabic literature, logic, Islamic philosophy, Qur’anic exegesis, theological schools of thought (milal wa niḥal), the science of narrators and narrations (ʾilm al-rijāl and al-dirāyah), theology (kalām), Islamic jurisprudence (fiqh), and the principles of jurisprudence (uṣūl al-fiqh).

His advanced seminary education was meticulously refined under the esteemed guidance of three senior Ayatollahs. He engaged in the study of exegetical sciences and philosophy under the distinguished Grand Ayatollah Abdollah Javadi Amoli, while his exploration of advanced jurisprudence was directed by the Grand Ayatollah Mirza Javād Tabrīzī. Concurrently, he participated in his father’s esteemed lectures on uṣūl al-fiqh and theology. The profound influence of these three scholars was pivotal in shaping his intellectual framework. During this time, he also contributed to the academic community by holding teaching positions at several of Iran’s most prestigious universities and seminaries. After two decades of deep immersion in the scholarly and spiritual atmosphere of Qom, Ayatollah Sobhani relocated to the United Kingdom in 2002, where he took on the role of a resident scholar and pursued further academic training within the Western intellectual tradition.

He subsequently earned an M.A. in Interfaith Relations from the University of Glasgow and a Ph.D. in Philosophy of Religion from the University of Edinburgh.

He has authored numerous articles and books across a broad spectrum of disciplines, including theology, philosophy, jurisprudence, the principles of jurisprudence, Qur’anic exegesis, history, the science of hadith narrators, and the fundamentals of belief. His scholarly contributions have been published in English, Farsi, and Arabic, reflecting his expertise and influence in these fields.

Among his notable works are Rijal Studies: An Introduction (2023), Religious Diversity in Contemporary Shi‘i Thought(2022), and Nayl al-Watar min Qa‘idah la Darar (The Jurisprudential Maxim of No Harm, 1999).

== Education ==
PhD (Philosophy of Religion) University of Edinburgh, 2019

MA (Interfaith relations) University of Glasgow, 2009

Post-doctoral level course (Kharij), Jurisprudence (Fiqh), Seminary of Qom, 1991-2002 Supervisor: Ayatollah Mirza Javad Tabrizi

Post-doctoral level course (Kharij), Principles of Jurisprudence (ʿIlm Usul al-Fiqh), Seminary of Qom, 1991-2002 Supervisor: Ayatollah Ja’far Sobhani

Advanced Islamic Philosophy (Asfar); under the personal supervision of Ayatollah Javadi-Amoli, 1997-2002

Advanced Philosophy and Theology, Imam Sadiq Institute, (Qom) 1991-1995 Key modules: Philosophy, Theology, Hermeneutics, Logic and Ethics.

Advanced Interpretation of the Qur’an (Kharij Tafsir), 1988-2002 Supervisor: Ayatollah Javadi-Amoli

BA, Islamic Studies, Seminary of Qom, 1983-1991 Key modules: Arabic literature, logic, Islamic philosophy, Quranic sciences, interpretation of the Quran, the Theological Schools of Thought (Milal va Nihal), the science of narrators and narrations(ʾIlm al-Rijal and al- Dirayah), Theology, Islamic Jurisprudence (Fiqh) and the Principles of the science of jurisprudence (ʾIlm Usul al- Fiqh)

== Books ==
- Dirayah Studies: An Introduction. London: Contemporary Thoughts Press, 2025. (forthcoming)
- Worldview and the Theory of Knowledge. London: Contemporary Thoughts Press, 2023.
- Rijal Studies: an Introduction. London: Contemporary Thoughts Press, 2023.
- Religious Diversity in Contemporary Shi’i Thought. London: ICAS Press, 2022.
- Jahān-bīnī va Shinākht (Epistemology). Qom: Imam Ṣādiq Institute, 1988.
- Nayl al-Waṭar min Qāʿidah lā Ḍarar (The Jurisprudential Maxim of No Harm). Qom: Imam Ṣādiq Institute, 1999.
- Lubb al- ʾAthar fī al-Jabr wa al-Qadar (Predestination and Free will). Qom: Imam Ṣādiq Institute

== Articles ==
- “A Critical View on Sayyid Quṭb and the Status of Intellect (ʿAql)”, Journal of Shi‘a Islamic Studies (JSIS), 2023.
- “The Role of Intellect in the Perspective of Imamiyyah Jurists”, al-Qalam Journal. 2024.
- Imamate and the Principle of Loving-Kindness. The Journal of ‘Contemporary Study of Islam’ (JCSI). 2022.
- Pluralism Dīnī dar Chishm Andāz-i mā (Religious Pluralism in our Perspective). Journal of Islamic Theology. 2007.
- Sharī’at Fāragīr va Jāhanī va Nasikh Sharāyiʿ Pīshīn, (The Universal Shari’at and the Abrogator of the Previous Sharayiʿ). Journal of Islamic Theology. 2007
- Gūshe’ī az Munāzirātpi kalāmī (A Brief Account of Theological Debates), Journal of Islamic Theology.1995.
- Āmūzi-i hāy-i Ghīyām-i ʿĀshūrā (The Teachings of the ʿĀshūrā Movement), Journal of Islamic Theology, 2008.
- Kūdāmyik az du ṭaʿbīr ṣaḥīḥ āst, “Kitāba Allah va ʿItratī Ahl al-Baytī” ya “Kītāba Allah va Sunnatī”, (Which one of these two title is correct: the Qur’an and my ʿItrah or the Qur’an and my Sunnah) Journal of Islamic Theology. 1995.
