= As-Saff =

61st chapter of the Qur'an

Surah 61 of the Quran
الصف Aṣ-Ṣaff The Ranks
- Qira'ah; English text
- Classification: Medinan
- Other names: The Column, The Ranks, Battle Array
- Position: Juzʼ 28
- No. of verses: 14
- No. of Rukus: 2

As-Saff
Recitation of As-Saff in mujawwad.

As-Saff (Arabic: الصف, aṣ-Ṣaff, aka "The Ranks") is the 61st chapter (sūrah) of the Quran, with 14 verses (āyāt). This sura is an Al-Musabbihat sura because it begins with the glorification of God.

== Summary ==
- 1 All things in the universe praise God
- 2-4 Muslims exhorted to be faithful and to fight for Islam
- 5 This exhortation enforced by the example of Moses
- 6 Jesus foretells a Messenger named Ahmad (Mohamed)
- 7-8 Jesus was rejected as a sorcerer notwithstanding his miracles
- 9 Islam to be exalted above every other religion
- 10-11 Muslims exhorted to seek forgiveness by striving in the cause of Allah
- 12-13 The rewards of those who fight for the faith
- 14 Muslims exhorted to follow the example of the apostles of Jesus

== Hadith ==
A hadith Abdullah bin Salam said: “A group of us Companions of the Messenger of Allah sat talking, and we said: ‘If we knew which deed was most beloved to Alllah then we would do it.’ So Allah, Most High, revealed: Whatsoever is in the heavens and whatsoever is on the earth glorifies Allah. And He is Almighty, the All-Wise. O you who believe! Why do you say that which you do not do?” Abdullah bin Salam said: “So the Messenger of Allah recited it to us.” Abu Salamah (one of the narrators) said: “So Ibn Salam recited it to us.” Yahya (one of the narrators) said: “So Abu Salamah narrated it to us.” Ibn Kathir said: “So Al-Awza’i recited it to us.” Abdullah said: “So Ibn Kathir recited it to us.”
