= At-Taghabun =

64th chapter of the Qur'an

Surah 64 of the Quran
التغابن At-Taghābun Loss, Deprivation
- Qira'ah; English text
- Classification: Medinan
- Position: Juzʼ 28
- No. of verses: 18
- No. of Rukus: 2
- No. of words: 242
- No. of letters: 1066

At-Taghabun
Recitation of At-Taghabun in mujawwad.

At-Taghābun (Arabic: التغابن, "Loss, Deprivation") is the 64th surah of the Quran with 18 verses. This Medinan surah opens with the words of glorification of God (Allah in Arabic) and is part of Al-Musabbihat group. The theme of this surah is an invitation to the Faith, obedience (to God) and the teaching of good morals, contrasting with the previous surah, Al-Munafiqun, which is concerned with hypocrisy and the lack of Iman.

== Summary ==
The sequence followed is that the first four verses are addressed to all human-kind, verses 5–10 to those men who do not believe in the invitation of the Qur'an, and verses 11–18 to those who accept and believe in this invitation.

== Ayat (verses) ==
- 1 All things in heaven and earth praise God
- 2 God hath fore-ordained men to be either believers or unbelievers
- 3-4 God, the Creator, knows all things - what is in the universe and on earth, what you conceal and what you declare
- 5-6 Former nations destroyed for their unbelief
- 7 Unbelief will not prevent infidels from rising from the dead
- 8-10 Exhortation to believe in God and all his messengers including his final messenger Muhammad
- 11-13 God is sovereign, and therefore should be trusted
- 14-18 Muslims exhorted to abjure worldly ties and to devote themselves to God.

== Theme and subject matter ==
The surah opens with a description of God's power, wisdom, and knowledge, and takes its name from “the day of dispossession” (yawm al-taghabun) mentioned in verse 9. God, the Creator, knoweth all things, is told in 3rd and 4th verse. The disbelievers are reminded of the end of those who disbelieved before them in verses 5 and 6. Unbelief will not prevent infidels from rising from the dead and their denial of the Resurrection is strongly refuted in verse 7. Next 3 ayaat then present exhortation to believe in God and his Apostle. In the discourse verses 11 to 13 prescribe to humanity that God is sovereign, therefore should be trusted. Further in verse 14, the believers are urged to be wary but forgiving of the enemies they may have within their own families and muslims are exhorted to abjure worldly ties and to devote themselves to God in ayaat 14 to 18 and are warned to remain steadfast and to spend in God's cause in verse 8 and 16.
