= Munafiq =

Hypocrites in Islam

In Islam, the munafiqun (lit. 'hypocrites', Arabic: منافقون, singular منافق, munāfiq) or false Muslims or false believers are a group decried in the Quran as outward Muslims who are inwardly concealing disbelief (kufr) and actively seek to undermine the Muslim community. A munafiq is a person who in public and in community shows that he is a Muslim, but rejects Islam or speaks against it either in his heart or among the enemies of Islam. The hypocrisy itself is called nifāq (نفاق).

== Types of hypocrisy ==
- Hypocrisy towards God regarding actual faith. (Q2:8) and (Q2:14)
- Hypocrisy towards the tenets of faith: for example, somebody may believe in God, Judgment Day, accounting, scales of deeds, and Hellfire but not fear them at all or not refrain from committing sins because of them. Yet he claims: "I fear God".
- Hypocrisy towards the deeds; Not performing obligatory works properly.
- Hypocrisy towards others: somebody is double-faced and double-tongued. He praises someone in their presence, then, behind their back, he denounces them and tries to cause them pain and harm.
- Hypocrisy of sacred terms: One of the largest signs of a Munafiq is their careless use of religious oaths which include: Wallahi ("I swear by Allah"), Tallahi ("By Allah"), and Billahi ("With/By Allah").

=== Hadith ===
Abdullah ibn Amr reported:

The Messenger of Allah, peace and blessings be upon him, said: "There are four signs that make someone a pure hypocrite and whoever has them has a characteristic of hypocrisy until he abandons it: (1) when he speaks he lies; (2) when he makes a covenant he is treacherous; (3) when he makes a promise he breaks it; and (4) when he argues he is wicked."

== Munafiqun in the Quran ==
The Quran has many verses discussing munafiqun, referring to them as more dangerous to Muslims than the worst non-Muslim enemies of Islam.

In the Quran, the munafiqun are berated for their disloyalty towards the Muslims. They are described as seeking the subversion of Islam from within by dissembling a false allegiance. According to Surah 9:107-108 there was even a mosque of dissent that they built; this mosque was burned down by Muhammad.

The 63rd chapter (Surah) of the Quran is titled al-Munafiqun. The chapter deals with the phenomenon of hypocrisy; it criticizes hypocrisy and condemns the hypocrites; the treachery of the hypocrites of Medina is exposed and rebuked; Muhammad is warned to beware of trusting the hypocrites; the hypocrites are cursed and declared reprobates; the hypocrites are threatened with expulsion from Medina.

== Traits of the Munafiqun according to Hadith ==
Hadith—records of the words, actions explained by Muhammad—describe several traits of a hypocrite and these traits include both apparent actions and his/her inner Iman/faith like the following:

- Abdullah ibn Amr reported the Messenger of Allah as saying: Four characteristics constitute anyone who possesses them a sheer hypocrite (munafiq), and anyone who possesses one of them possesses a characteristic of hypocrisy till he abandons it:
1. when he talks he lies,
2. when he makes a promise he violates it,
3. when he makes a covenant he acts treacherously, and
4. when he quarrels/engages in a dispute, he explodes (فَجَرَ, fajara) (abuses/deviates from the truth/behaves very imprudently, irrationally, foolishly, evilly and insultingly)
- Narrated Abu Hurayra: The Prophet said, "The signs of a munafiq are three:
1. Whenever he speaks, he tells a lie.
2. Whenever he promises, he always breaks it (his promise).
3. If you trust him, he proves to be dishonest. (If you keep something as a trust with him, he will not return it.)" Another narration adds the words: "Even if he observes Saum (fasts), performs Salat (prayer) and claims to be a Muslim."
- Narrated Abdullah ibn Umar: Allah's Messenger said, "A believer eats in one intestine (is satisfied with a little food), and a kafir (unbeliever) or a munafiq eats in seven intestines (eats too much, or eats the food of 7 believing people—i.e—that which they are not entitled)".
- Abu Hurayra narrated that the Messenger of Allah said: "He who dies without having gone or thought of going out for jihad in the Cause of Allah, will die while being guilty of having one of the qualities of hypocrisy". Related by Imam Muslim.
- Abu Umamah al Bahili narrated that the Messenger of Allah said: "Al-Haya' (modesty) and Al-'Iy (terse, brief & not talkative) are two branches of faith, and Al-Badha (vulgar) and Al-Bayan (very talkative) are two branches of Hypocrisy."
- It was narrated that Zirr said: Ali ibn Abi Talib said: "The Unlettered Prophet (Muhammad) made a covenant with me, that none but a believer would love me, and none but a munafiq would hate me."
- Narrated Anas bin Malik: The Prophet said, "Love for the Ansar is a sign of faith and hatred for the Ansar is a sign of hypocrisy."
- It was narrated from Ibn 'Umar that: The Messenger of Allah said: "The parable of the munafiq is that of a sheep that hesitates between two flocks, sometimes following one, and sometimes following another, not knowing which to follow."
- Abu Huraira reported Allah's Messenger as saying: The Similitude of a believer is that of (a standing) crop which the air continues to toss from one side to another; in the same way a believer always (receives the strokes) of misfortune. The similitude of a munafiq is that of a cypress tree which does not move until it is uprooted.
- It was narrated that the Prophet said: "Women who seek divorce and Khul' without just cause are like the female munafiq."
- Narrated Buraydah ibn al-Hasib: The Prophet said: Do not call a Munafiq as sayyid (master), for if he is a sayyid, you will displease your Lord, Most High.

Salih Al Munajjid in his book Nifaq describes the nature and character of hypocrites as described in Quran and Hadith. These are:

1. Disordered mind
2. Seduction of pleasure
3. Show of pride
4. Mocking with the verses of Allah
5. Jokes with the believers
6. Forbidding people to spend on the way of Allah
7. Maintaining harmony with unbelievers calling believers fools
8. Waiting for believers' result
9. Deception with Allah and laziness in worship
10. Tense and wavering attitude
11. Fooling the believers
12. Submitting lawsuits to apostate rulers
13. False oaths, fear, cowardice and restlessness
14. Create havoc among the believers
15. They thirst for praise in the name of doing what they did not do
16. They consider good deeds polluting
17. Happy at the lowest position
18. The order of injustice and the prohibition of justice
19. Disliking Jihad and turning away from it
20. Inciting not to fight and spreading scaremongering rumours
21. Unwillingness for being with the believers
22. Ask permission not to participate in Jihad
23. Excuses for holding back from Jihad
24. Trying to hide from people's eyes
25. Rejoicing at the loss of the believers
26. Betraying trusts, lying in conversation, breaking promises and using bad language in arguments.
27. Delaying Salat from its due time
28. Do not participate in Salaat Jama'a.
29. Ugly words and vulgarity
30. Listening to music

== Remedy of Nifaq ==
Salih Al-Munajjid in his book Nifaq, as a remedy for Nifaq, says to do 10 things according to Quran and Sahih Hadith,

1. Attending daily congregational prayers (Salat al-jama‘ah) with Takbeer Ula (known as Takbeer Tahrima) or First Takbeer for 40 consecutive days and attending in all the congregational prayers regularly

Anas bin Malik narrated that : Allah's Messenger said: "Whoever performs Salat for Allah for forty days in congregation, catching the first Takbir, two absolutions are written for him: absolution from the Fire, and absolution from hypocrisy."

— Grade: Da'if (Darussalam)/Hasan Ligairihi, Reference : (Jami` at-Tirmidhi 241 In-book reference : Book 2, Hadith 93 English translation : Vol. 1, Book 2, Hadith 241), Sahihah 1979, Sahih At-Targhib 409, Sahih Al-Jami' 6365.

1. Doing good deeds and gaining knowledge about religion
2. Philanthropy
3. Praying at night
4. Jihad in the way of Allah
5. Remembrance of Allah more and more (Dhikr)
6. Dua
7. Love for the Ansar
8. Love for Ali Ibn Abi Talib

== What Muslims should do with hypocrites ==
Salih Al Munajjid told Muslims to deal with hypocrites as follows according to the Quran and Sahih Hadith:

1. Disobey them
2. Ignoring, intimidating and admonishing the hypocrites
3. Do not engage in debate with the hypocrites and do not favor them
4. Do not make friends with hypocrites
5. Waging jihad against the hypocrites and imposing austerity
6. Show contempt for hypocrites and do not make them leaders
7. Not participating in the funeral procession of the hypocrites

== See also ==
- Abdullah ibn Ubayy
- Apostasy in Islam
- Crypto-Islam
- Destruction of early Islamic heritage sites in Saudi Arabia
- Demolition of Masjid al-Dirar
- Glossary of Islam
- Outline of Islam
- Index of Islam-related articles
- Dönmeh
- Kafir
- Kitman
- Sabbateans
- Shabakism
- Taqiyya
- Zandaqa
