= Abu Salih as-Samman =

Tabi'un and early Islamic Scholar

- أبو صالح السمان

Personal life
- Died: 720 CE (101 AH)
- Era: Early Islamic era
- Region: Caliphate

Religious life
- Religion: Islam
- Denomination: Sunni

Abu Salih as-Samman (Arabic: أبو صالح السمان) (died AH 101, CE 720) was an early Islamic scholar of Medinah. He was a narrator of Hadith is among the Tabi'un generation of Muslims.

== Biography ==
He was born during the reign of Umar ibn Al-Khattab, and was the freed slave of Juwayriyya - the wife of Muhammad. He resided in Medina and witnessed the siege of Uthman. He died in 101 AH at the end of the reign of Umar ibn Abd al-Aziz.

== Teachers ==
He met many of the companions of Muhammad, and narrated hadith from:

- Sa'd ibn Abi Waqqas
- Aisha
- Abu Hurairah
- Abd Allah ibn Abbas
- Abd Allah ibn Umar ibn al-Khattab

== Students ==
Some of the people who narrated from him include:

- Sohail ibn Abi Saleh (son)
- Sulaiman Al-A’mash
- Zayd ibn Aslam
- Abdullah ibn Dinar
- Ibn Shihab al-Zuhri

== Reception ==
Ahmad ibn Hanbal said that he is considered Thiqa, (trustworthy in matters of hadith) and was greatly renowned and respected.
