= Al-Hashr =

59th chapter of the Qur'an

Surah 59 of the Quran
الحشر Al-Ḥashr The Exile
- Qira'ah; English text
- Classification: Medinan
- Position: Juzʼ 28
- No. of verses: 24
- No. of Rukus: 3
- No. of words: 448
- No. of letters: 1,970

Al-Ḥashr (Arabic: الحشر, "The Exile") is the 59th chapter (sūrah) of the Qur'an and has 24 Āyahs (verses). The chapter is named al-hashr because the word hashr appears in verse 2, describing the expulsion of Jewish Banu Nadir tribe from their settlements. The surah features 15 attributes of God in the last three verses. A similitude is given in verse 21. Verse 6 may be related to the controversies of the land of Fadak.

== Summary ==
- 1 Everything in the universe praiseth God
- 2-5 Passage relating to the expulsion of the Banu Nadir
- 6-7 Ruling of God concerning spoils
- 8-10 Special ruling for the benefit of the Muhajirun
- 11-17 Hypocrites in Madína reproved for treachery
- 18-20 Muslims exhorted to fear God
- 21 Had the Quran descended on a mountain, it would have split asunder
- 22-24 God hath excellent names, and He only to be worshipped

== Exegesis ==
Surah Al-Hashr opens with God proclaiming: 1 Whatsoever is in the heavens and whatsoever is on the earth glorifies God. And He is the Almighty, the All-Wise.

In Tafsir ibn kathir, Al-Hafiz ibn Kathir explained the significance of the Ayah. He wrote: “Everything glorifies God in its own way. God states that everything that exists in the heavens and on the earth praises, glorifies, reveres and prays to Him and affirms His Oneness." Further, God said in another Ayah: The seven heavens and the earth and all that is therein, glorify Him and there is not a thing but glorifies His praise. But you understand not their glorification (Q17:44)

Ali, the cousin of Muhammad, narrates about the following verse: 7 Whatever God grants to His Messenger (out of the property) of the people of the towns, belongs to God, the Messenger, the kinsfolk, the orphans, the destitute . . . saying that "We are the Ahl al-Bayt (kinsfolk) and this applies to such persons from us exclusively. It is the way God has honored His Holy Prophet and has honored us instead of providing us the unlawful things in the hands of people".

=== Verses 21-24 ===
The last four Ayahs and commentary by ibn Kathir read:

21 Had We sent down this Qur’an on a mountain, you would surely have seen it humbling itself and rent asunder by the fear of God. Such are the parables which We put forward to mankind that they may reflect.

Commenting on Ayah 21, Al-Hafiz Ibn Kathir wrote: “God the Exalted emphasizes the greatness of the Qur’an, its high status and of being worthy of making hearts humble and rent asunder upon hearing it, because of the true promises and sure threats that it contains."

22 He is God, beside Whom La ilaha illa Huwa, the All-Knower of the unseen and the seen. He is the Most Gracious, the Most Merciful.

Commenting on Ayah 22, Al-Hafiz Ibn Kathir wrote:

“God states that He Alone is worthy of worship, there is no Lord or God for the existence, except Him. All that is being worshiped instead of God are false deities. God is the All-Knower in the unseen and the seen, He knows all that pertains to the creations that we see, and those we cannot see. Nothing in heaven or on earth ever escapes His knowledge, no matter how great or insignificant, big or small, including ants in darkness.“God’s statement, ‘He is the Most Gracious, the Most Merciful’ . . . asserts that God is the Owner of the wide encompassing mercy that entails all of His creation. He is Ar-Rahman and Ar-Rahim of this life and of the Hereafter.”

23 He is God, beside Whom lā ilaha illā-llah, Al-Malik, Al-Quddus, As-Salam, Al-Mu’min, Al-Muhaymin, Al-Aziz, Al-Jabbar, Al-Mutakabbir. Glory be to God! Above all that they associate as partners with Him.

Al-Hafiz Ibn Kathir then set out the meaning of God's Names that are listed in Ayah 23. He wrote that Al Malik means "The Owner and King of all things, Who has full power over them without resistance or hindrance". He explained that Al-Quddus, means "‘The Pure’, according to Wahb bin Munabbih, while Mujahid and Qatadah said that Al-Quddus means ‘The Blessed’. Ibn Jurayj said that Al-Quddus means ‘He whom the honorable angels glorify'." As-Salam, means "Free from any defects or shortcomings that lessen or decrease His perfect attributes and actions" while Al-Mu’min means one "Who has granted safety to His servants by promising that He will never be unjust to them. According to Ad-Dahhak who reported it from Abd Allah ibn Abbas. Qatadah said that Al-Mu’min means that ‘God affirms that His statements are true’, while Ibn Zayd said that it means, ‘He attested to His faithful servants’ having faith in Him. Al-Hafiz Ibn Kathir noted that Al-Muhaymin meant, according to Ibn ‘Abbas and others, ‘The Witness for His servants actions’, that is the Ever-Watcher over them.

Al-Aziz means "He is the Almighty, Dominant over all things. Therefore, His majesty is never violated, due to His might, greatness, irresistible power and pride". Al-Jabbar, Al-Mutakabbir means "The Only One worthy of being the Compeller and Supreme. There is a Hadith in the Sahih Collection in which God said: ‘Might is my Izar and pride is My Rida; if anyone disputes any one of them with Me, then I will punish him.’”

24 He is God, Al-Khaliq, Al-Bari and Al-Musawwir. To Him belongs the Best Names. All that is in the heavens and the earth glorify Him. And He is the Almighty, the All-Wise.

Commenting on Ayah 24, Al-Hafiz Ibn Kathir wrote: "Al-Khaliq refers to measuring and proportioning, Al-Bari refers to inventing and bringing into existence What he has created and measured. Surely, none except God is able to measure, bring forth and create whatever He wills to come to existence. God’s statement, Al-Khaliq, Al-Bari, Al-Musawwir means, if God wills something, He merely says to it ‘be’ and it comes to existence in the form that He wills and the shape He chooses.”
