= Al-Jumu'ah =

62nd chapter of the Qur'an

Surah 62 of the Quran
الجمعة Al-Jumuʿah Friday
- Qira'ah; English text
- Classification: Medinan
- Other names: Friday, The Day of Congregation
- Position: Juzʼ 28
- No. of verses: 11
- No. of Rukus: 2
- No. of words: 177
- No. of letters: 772

Al-Jumu'ah
Recitation of Al-Jumu'ah in mujawwad.

Al-Jumuʿah (Arabic: الجمعة, "Friday") is the 62nd chapter (sūrah) of the Quran, with 11 verses (āyāt). The chapter is named al-jumu`ah ("Friday") because it is the day of assembly, when the community abandons trade, transactions, and other diversions in favor of assembling to seek the all-encompassing truth and most beneficent and seek the "bounty of Allah" exclusively (Verse 9). This surah is an Al-Musabbihat surah because it begins with the glorification of Allah.

== Summary ==
1-4 A wise, powerful, and holy God sent Muhammad as his apostle to the Arabians
5-8 The Jews rebuked for their opposition to Islam
9-11 Admonition concerning the observance of worship on Friday

== Hadith about Surah Al-Jumua ==
- In the Friday prayer he (Muhammad) would recite Surah Al-Jumua and Surah Al-Munafiqun (63).
- Al-Dahhak b. Qais asked al-Nu'man b. Bashir: What did the Messenger of Allah recite on Friday after reciting the Surah Al-Jumua. He replied: He used to recite, "Had the story of overwhelming event reached you?" (Al-Ghashiyah (88)).
- Ibn Abi Rafi' said: Abu Hurairah led us in the Friday prayer and recited Surah Al-Jumua and "When the hypocrites come to you" (Al-Munafiqun 63) in the last rak'ah. He said: I met Abu Hurairah when he finished the prayer and said to him: You recited the two surah that Ali ibn Abi Talib used to recite at Kufa. Abu Hurairah said: I heard the Messenger of Allah reciting them on Friday.
