= Al-Munafiqun =

63rd chapter of the Qur'an

Surah 63 of the Quran
المنافقون Al-Munāfiqūn The Hypocrites
- Qira'ah; English text
- Classification: Medinan
- Position: Juzʼ 28
- No. of verses: 11
- No. of Rukus: 2

Al-Munafiqun
Recitation of Al-Munafiqun in mujawwad.

Al-Munāfiqūn (Arabic: المنافقون, lit. 'the Hypocrites') is the 63rd chapter (surah) of the Qur'an, with 11 verses. Almost all of the chapter is preserved in the Ṣan‘ā’1 lower text.

== Summary ==
The chapter deals with the phenomenon of hypocrisy. It criticizes hypocrisy and condemns the hypocrites. It also exhorts the Believers to be sincere in their faith and make charity. According to Muslim theologian, Javed Ahmad Ghamidi, the theme of Qur'an 63 is to inform the Muslims that the Hypocrites are absolute liars. Amin Ahsan Islahi elaborates that:

This surah is a supplement to Surah Jum`ah, the previous surah. It can be divided into two sections. The first one consists of eight verses, while the last three verses constitute the second section. In the first section, the character of the hypocrites is evaluated and shown that their real ailment is their lust for worldly riches. In the second section, Muslims are warned that the love of wealth and children should not make them indifferent to the remembrance of the Almighty. If today they do not truly benefit from their wealth by not spending in the way of Allah, they will feel sorry, once their life ends and at that moment their regret will be of no use to them. In other words, in the first section the illness of hypocrisy is elaborated upon, while in the second section, Muslims are asked to guard themselves against it.

== Ayat (verses) ==
1-3 The treachery of the hypocrites of Medina exposed and rebuked
4 Muhammad warned to beware of trusting the hypocrites
5-6 Hypocrites cursed and declared reprobates
7-8 They are threatened with expulsion from Medina
9-11 The duty of almsgiving enjoined

== Asbāb al-nuzūl ==
Asbāb al-nuzūl (occasions or circumstances of revelation) is a secondary genre of Qur'anic exegesis (tafsir) directed at establishing the context in which specific verses of the Qur'an were revealed. Though of some use in reconstructing the Qur'an's historicity, asbāb is by nature an exegetical rather than a historiographical genre, and as such usually associates the verses it explicates with general situations rather than specific events. A hadith recorded by Muhammad al-Bukhari which narrates the occasion of revelation of this surah is as follows.

- Narrated Zayd ibn Arqam: While I was with my uncle, I heard Abd-Allah ibn Ubayy saying, "Do not spend on those who are with Allah's Messenger, that they may disperse and go away (from him). And if we return to Medina, surely, the more honorable will expel therefrom the meaner. "I mentioned that to my uncle who, in turn, mentioned it to the Prophet. The Prophet called me and I told him about that. Then he sent for Abd-Allah ibn Ubayy and his companions, and they swore that they did not say so. The Prophet disbelieved my statement and believed theirs. I was distressed as I have never been before, and I remained in my house. My uncle said to me, "You just wanted the Prophet to consider you a liar and hate you." Then Allah revealed:-- 'When the hypocrites come to you, they say: 'We bear witness that you are indeed the Apostle of Allah." (63.1) So the Prophet sent for me and recited it and said, "Allah has confirmed your statement."

== Hadith about Al-Munafiqun ==
- In the Friday prayer he (Muhammad) is said to have recited Surah Al-Jumua and Surah Al-Munafiqun.
- A hadith attributes Ibn Abi Rafi' as saying: Abu Hurairah led us in the Friday prayer and recited Surah Al-Jumua and "When the hypocrites come to you" (Al-Munafiqun) in the last rak'ah. He said: I met Abu Hurairah when he finished the prayer and said to him: You recited the two surah that Ali ibn Abi Talib used to recite at Kufa. Abu Hurairah said: I heard the Messenger of Allah reciting them on Friday.

== See also ==
- Munafiq — the concept of hypocrisy in Islam
- Al-Baqarah - Surah 2:8-20, concerning the hypocrites
