= Surah =

Chapter of the Quran

A surah (/ˈsʊərə/; Arabic: سُورَة, romanized: sūrah; pl. سُوَر, suwar) is an Arabic word meaning "chapter" in the Quran. There are 114 surahs in the Quran, each divided into verses (Arabic: آيات, romanized: āyāt, lit. 'signs'). The surahs are of unequal length; the shortest surah ("al-Kawthar") has only three verses, while the longest (al-Baqarah) contains 286 verses. The Quran consists of one short introductory chapter (Q1), eight very long chapters, making up one-third of the Quran (Q2‒9); 19 mid-length chapters, making up another one-third (Q10‒28); and 86 short and very short ones of the last one-third (Q29‒114).

Of the 114 surahs in the Quran, 86 are classified as Meccan (Arabic: مكي, romanized: makkī), as according to Islamic tradition they were revealed before Muhammad's migration to Medina (hijrah), while 28 are Medinan (Arabic: مدني, romanized: madanī), as they were revealed after. This classification is only approximate in regard to the location of revelation; any surah revealed after the migration is termed Medinan and any revealed before it is termed Meccan, regardless of where the surah was revealed. However, some Meccan suwar contain Medinan verses (verses revealed after the migration) and vice versa. Whether a surah is Medinan or Meccan depends on if the beginning of the surah was revealed before or after the migration.

The Meccan surahs generally deal with faith and scenes of the Hereafter while the Medinan surahs are more concerned with organizing the social life of the nascent Muslim community and leading Muslims to the ultimate goal of attaining dar al-Islam by showing strength towards the unbelievers. Except for surah "At-Tawbah", all suwar commence with "In the Name of Allah, the Beneficent, the Merciful" (Arabic: بِسْمِ ٱللَّٰهِ ٱلرَّحْمَٰنِ ٱلرَّحِيمِ, romanized: bi-smi llāhi r-raḥmāni r-raḥīm). This formula is known as the basmalah (Arabic: بَسْمَلَة) and denotes the boundaries between suwar. The suwar are arranged roughly in order of descending size; therefore the arrangement of the Quran is neither chronological nor thematic. Surahs are recited during the standing portions (Arabic: قيام, romanized: qiyām) of Muslim prayers. "Al-Fatiha", the first surah of the Quran, is recited in every unit of prayer, and some units of prayer also involve recitation of all or part of any other surah.

== Etymology ==
The word surah was used at the time of Muhammad as a term with the meaning of a portion or a set of verses of the Quran. This is evidenced by the appearance of the word surah in multiple locations in the Quran such as verse 24:1: "a sûrah which We have revealed and made ˹its rulings˺ obligatory, and revealed in it clear commandments so that you may be mindful." (see also verses 2:23, 9:64, 9:86, 9:124, 9:127, 10:38, and 47:20). It is also mentioned in plural form in the Quran: "Or do they say, “He has fabricated this ˹Quran˺!”? Say, ˹O Prophet,˺ “Produce ten fabricated sûrahs like it and seek help from whoever you can—other than Allah—if what you say is true!”"^{[Quran 11:13]}

In 1938, Arthur Jeffery suggested that the name derived from the Syriac word surṭā meaning 'writing'.

== Chronological order of chapters ==
Chapters in the Quran are not arranged in the chronological order of revelation, and the precise order has eluded scholars. According to hadith, Muhammad told his companions the traditional placement of every waḥy (Arabic: وَحْي, lit. 'revelation') as was revealed to him, and Wm Theodore de Bary, an East Asian studies expert, describes that "The final process of collection and codification of the Qur'an text was guided by one over-arching principle: God's words must not in any way be distorted or sullied by human intervention. For this reason, no attempt was made to edit the numerous revelations, organize them into thematic units, or present them in chronological order...".

A common view is that surahs of the Meccan period (i.e., pre-hijrah) are more related to themes such as resurrection, judgment, and stories from Judaism and Christianity. Surahs of the Medinian period (i.e., post-hijrah) focus more on laws for personal affairs, society, and the state.

=== Early attempts ===
A number of medieval Islamic writers attempted to compile a chronologically ordered list of the chapters, with differing results. As no transmitted reports dating back to the time of Muhammad or his companions exists, their works necessarily represent the opinions of scholars, and none originates before the first quarter of the 8th century. One version is given in a 15th-century work by Abd al-Kafi, and is included in the chronological order given by the standard Egyptian edition of the Quran (1924). Another list is mentioned by Abu Salih, while a significantly different version of Abu Salih's is preserved in the book 'Kitab Mabani'. Yet another, from the 10th century, is given by Ibn Nadim.

A number of verses are associated with particular events which helps date them. Muhammad's first revelation was Chapter 96 and in the year 609. Verses 16:41 and 47:13 refer to migration of Muslims which took place in the year 622. Verses 8:1–7 and 3:120–175 refer to battles of Badr (624) and Uhud (625) respectively. Muhammad's last pilgrimage (Arabic: حِجَّة ٱلْوَدَاع, romanized: Ḥijjat al-Wadāʿ) is mentioned in 5:3 which occurred in 632, a few months before he died. This method is of limited usefulness because the Quran narrates the life of Muhammad or the early history of the Muslim community only incidentally and not in detail. In fact, very few chapters contain clear references to events which took place in Muhammad's life.

=== Modern work ===
Theodor Nöldeke's chronology is based on the assumption that the style of the Quran changes in one direction without reversals. Nöldeke studied the style and content of the chapters and assumed that first, later (Medinan) chapters and verses and are generally longer than earlier (Meccan) ones, and second, that earlier Meccan verses have a distinct rhyming style while later verses are more prosaic (prose-like). According to Nöldeke, earlier chapters have common features: many of them open with oaths in which God swears by cosmic phenomena, they have common themes (including eschatology, creation, piety, authentication of Muhammad's mission and refutation of the charges against Muhammad), and some Meccan chapters have a clear 'tripartite' structure (for example chapters 45, 37, 26, 15, 21). Tripartite chapters open with a short warning, followed by one or more narratives about unbelievers, and finally address contemporaries of Muhammad and invite them to Islam. On the other hand, Madinan verses are longer and have a distinct style of rhyming and concern to provide legislation and guidance for the Muslim community.

Richard Bell took Nöldeke's chronology as a starting point for his research, however, Bell did not believe that Nöldeke's criteria of style were important. He saw a progressive change in Muhammad's mission from a man who preached monotheism into an independent leader of a paramount religion. For Bell this transformation in Muhammad's mission was more decisive compared with Nöldeke's criteria of style. Bell argued that passages which mentioned Islam and Muslim or implied that Muhammad's followers were a distinct community were revealed later. He classified the Quran into three main periods: the early period, the Quranic period, and the book period. Bell worked on the chronology of verses instead of chapters. Underlying Bell's method for dating revelations is the assumption that the normal unit of revelation is the short passage and the passages have been extensively edited and rearranged.

Mehdi Bazargan divided the Quran into 194 independent passages preserving some chapters intact as single blocks while dividing others into two or more blocks. He then rearranged these blocks approximately in order of increasing average verse length. This order he proposes is the chronological order. Bazargan assumed that verse length tended to increase over time and he used this assumption to rearrange the passages.

Neal Robinson, a scholar of Islamic studies, is of the opinion that there is no evidence that the style of Quran has changed in a consistent way and therefore style may not always be a reliable indicator of when and where a chapter was revealed. According to Robinson, the problem of the chronology of authorship is still far from solved.

== Names of chapters in the Quran ==
The verses and chapters in the Quran did not originally have a title attached to them. Muhammad, as we find in some reports in hadith, used to refer to shorter chapters not by name, rather by their first verse. For example: Abu Hurairah quoted Muhammad as saying, "Al-Hamdu Lillahi Rabb il-`Aalameen (Arabic: الْحَمْدُ لِلَّهِ رَبِّ الْعَالَمِينَ, lit. 'Praise be to Allah, the Lord of the worlds') is the Mother of the Qur'an, the Mother of the Book, and the seven oft-repeated verses of the Glorious Qur'an." We also find reports in which Muhammad used to refer to them by their name. For example, Abdullah bin Buraydah narrated from his father, "I was sitting with the Prophet and I heard him say, 'Learn Surat ul-Baqarah, because in learning it there is blessing, in ignoring it there is sorrow, and the sorceresses cannot memorize it."'

Arab tradition, similar to other tribal cultures of that time, was to name things according to their unique characteristics. They used this same method to name Quranic chapters. Most chapter names are found in the ahadith. Some were named according to their central theme, such as Al-Fatiha (The Opening) and Yusuf (Joseph), and some were named for the first word at the beginning of the chapter, such as Qaf, Ya-Sin, and ar-Rahman. Some surahs were also named according to a unique word that occurs in the chapter, such as al-Baqarah (The Cow), An-Nur (The Light), al-Nahl (The Bee), Az-Zukhruf (The Ornaments of Gold), Al-Hadid (The Iron), and Al-Ma'un (The Small Kindness).

Most chapter names are still used to this day. Several are known by multiple names: Surah Al-Masadd (The Palm Fibre) is also known as Surah al-Lahab (The Flame). Surah Fussilat (Explained in Detail) is also known as Ha-Meem Sajda ("...it is a chapter that begins with Ha Mim (Arabic: حم) and in which a verse requiring the performance of prostration (Arabic: سجدة, romanized: sajdah) has occurred.")

== Coherence in the Quran ==
The idea of textual relation between the verses of a chapter has been discussed under various titles such as nazm (Arabic: ﻧَﻈﻢ) and munasabah (Arabic: مناسبة) in literature of the Islamic sphere and 'Coherence', 'text relations', 'intertextuality', and 'unity' in English literature. There are two points of view regarding the coherence of the verses of the Quran. In the first viewpoint, each chapter of the Quran has a central theme and its verses are related. The second viewpoint considers some chapters of the Quran as collections of passages which are not thematically related. Chapters deal with various subjects, for instance, chapter 99, which comprises only eight verses, is devoted exclusively to eschatology and chapter 12 narrates a story, while other chapters, in the same breath, speak of theological, historical, and ethico-legal matters. Chapters are known to consist of passages, not only verses. The borders between passages are arbitrary but are possible to determine.

For example, chapter 54 may be divided into six passages:

- The Hour has drawn near...(54:1-8)
- Before them, the people of Noah denied...(54:9-17)
- ’Ȃd ˹also˺ rejected ˹the truth˺. Then how ˹dreadful˺ were My punishment and warnings!... (54:18-22)
- Thamûd rejected the warnings ˹as well˺... (54:23-32)
- The people of Lot ˹also˺ rejected the warnings... (54:33-40)
- And indeed, the warnings ˹also˺ came to the people of Pharaoh.... (54:41-55)

The study of text relations in the Quran dates back to a relatively early stage in the history of Quranic studies. The earliest Quranic interpreter (Arabic: مُفَسِّر, romanized: mufassir) known to have paid attention to this aspect of the Quran is Fakhruddin al-Razi (d.1209 ). Al-Razi believed that text relation is a meaning that links verses together or mentally associates them like cause-effect or reason-consequence. He linked to verse 1 of a chapter to verse 2, verse 2 to verse 3 and so on, and rejected traditionist interpretations if they contradicted interrelations between verses. Az-Zarkashi (d.1392), another medieval Quranic exegete, admitted that relationships of some verses to other verses in a chapter is sometimes hard to explain, in those cases he assigned stylistic and rhetorical functions to them such as parenthesis, parable, or intentional subject shift. Az-Zarkashi aimed at showing how important understanding the inter-verse relations is to understanding the Quran, however, he did not attempt to deal with one complete chapter to show its relations.

Contemporary scholars have studied the idea of coherence in the Quran more vigorously and are of widely divergent opinions. For example, Hamid Farrahi (d. 1930) and Richard Bell (d. 1952) have different opinions regarding coherence within chapters. Farrahi believed that the whole structure of the Quran is thematically coherent, which is to say, all verses of a chapter of the Quran are integrally related to each other to give rise to the major theme of the chapter and again all of the chapters are interconnected with each other to constitute the major theme of the Quran. According to Farrahi, each chapter has a central theme (umud or pillar) around which the verses revolve:

Each chapter of the Quran is a well-structured unit. It is only a lack of consideration and analysis on our part that they seem disjointed and incoherent... Each chapter imparts a specific message as its central theme. The completion of this theme marks the end of the chapter. If there were no such specific conclusion intended to be dealt with in each chapter there would be no need to divide the Quran into chapters. Rather the whole Quran would be a single chapter... We see that a set of verses has been placed together and named 'surah' the way a city is built with a wall erected round it. A single wall must contain a single city in it. What is the use of a wall encompassing different cities?....

In contrast, Richard Bell describes the Quranic style as disjointed:

Only seldom do we find in it evidence of sustained unified composition at any great length...some of the narratives especially accounts of Moses and of Abraham run to considerable length, but they tend to fall into separate incidents instead of being recounted straightforwardly...the distinctness of the separate pieces however is more obvious than their unity.

Arthur J. Arberry states that the chapters in many instances, as Muslims have been recognized from the earliest times, are of a 'composite' character, holding embedded in them fragments received by Muhammad at widely differing dates. However he disregards this 'fact' and views each chapter as an artistic whole. He believed that a repertory of familiar themes runs through the whole Quran and each chapter elaborates one of more, often many of, them.

Angelika Neuwirth is of the idea that verses in their chronological order are interrelated in a way that later verses explain earlier ones. She believes that Meccan chapters are coherent units.

Salwa El-Awa aims in her work to discuss the problem of textual relations in the Quran from a linguistic point of view and the way in which the verses of one chapter relate to each other and to the wider context of the total message of the Quran. El-Awa provides a detailed analysis in terms of coherence theory on chapters 33 and 75 and shows that these two chapters cohere and have a main contextual relationship.

Gheitury and Golfam believe that the permanent change of subject within a passage in the Quran, or what they call non-linearity, is a major linguistic feature of the Quran, a feature that puts the Quran beyond any specific 'context' and 'temporality'. According to Gheitury and Golfam for the Quran there is no preface, no introduction, no beginning, no end, a reader can start reading from anywhere in the text.

== See also ==
- Chapters and verses of the Bible
- Parashah – Section of a biblical book in the Masoretic Text
- List of chapters in the Quran
- Al-Insan 7–9
