= Violence and peace in Islam =

Violence and peace in Islam could refer to:

- Islam and violence
- Peace in Islamic philosophy
- Religion of Peace
- Jihad (warfare)
