= Afghanistan withdrawal =

Afghanistan withdrawal may refer to:

- Soviet withdrawal from Afghanistan
- Withdrawal of United States troops from Afghanistan
  - Withdrawal of United States troops from Afghanistan (2011–2016)
  - Withdrawal of United States troops from Afghanistan (2020–2021)

For earlier invasions and withdrawals from Afghanistan, see Invasions of Afghanistan
