= Nafez Assaily =

Palestinian sociologist and peace activist (born 1956)

Nafez Assaily (Arabic: نافذ العسيلي), born in 1956 in the West Bank, in the Old City of Jerusalem grew up in Hebron, and is a sociologist and Palestinian peace activist. As early as 1997 he was defined as a Palestinian who had argued for a comprehensive strategy of non-violence through 43 years of the failure to achieve anything by armed struggle.

== Life and activism ==
Though a Sufi Muslim, he received his early education at Christian schools in Jerusalem – the first a Roman Catholic primary school, the other a Coptic Orthodox secondary school, and went on then began his tertiary studies at An-Najah National University in Nablus, where he majored in English and sociology. His background thus afforded him a familiarity with three distinct religious traditions each of which would contribute to his non-violent philosophy. His views on non-violence were shaped by Islamic mysticism, by Buddhism, and Gandhi, the 1982 film.

=== Encounter with Awad ===
He obtained a master's degree in peace studies and conflict resolution. A significant moment in his awareness came when he, a teacher of English in Jerusalem at the time, heard a talk in 1983 given by Mubarak Awad, a Christian Palestinian, and began to work under him. It was this talk which convinced Nafez that the idea of non-violence was not merely a pipe dream. Lucy Nusseibeh had invited Awad to talk at Birzeit University and, at the time, such talk was dangerous. According to her husband, the philosopher Sari Nusseibeh

At the time, to put forward the image of yourself as a non-violent person was not kosher in the Palestinian community. You had to put yourself forward as a guy with a gun, with ten guns hanging around your waist and shoulders, or keep silent.

Awad had founded the Palestinian Centre for the Study of Nonviolence (PCSN). When Awad was under threat of deportation he had to cancel his month-long appointment to the Gamaliel Chair at the Metropolitan Milwaukee Lutheran Campus ministry, and Assaily took his place, received a standing ovation from representatives from 51 church representatives in Milwaukee presbytery, and delivering addresses on 40 occasions. In June 1988, Awad was expelled from Israel, and Nafez became the center's acting director.

=== Broader issues ===
As director of PCSN, Assaily pressed Israel to enable family reunifications among Palestinians who were left separated from each other in 1967. Over a 23-year period, according to a Red Cross estimate, Israel had only approved of 9,000 reunifications among the 140,000 petitions requesting such permits. Israel allowed such reunions for Ethiopian and Russian Jews, and in 1990 Assaily forwarded a specific request to have 140 women and children who had been deported returned to their families.

Interviewed on the occasion of the 1990 Temple Mount riots in which some 20 Palestinians were killed, Assaily said provocations by either side were not the point: the problem was that Israel desired all of Jerusalem as its capital, whereas the Palestinians insist that East Jerusalem, where the Haram al-Sharif/Temple Mount lies, be the capital of a future Palestinian state.

=== Books on Wheels ===
In 1986 he developed, in collaboration with the PCSN, his own project of a mobile book-loan service called "Library on Wheels for Nonviolence and Peace" (LOWNP) in Hebron in order to encourage reading among the youth of the town, and in particular the study of non-violence. Blind children in the area can borrow books on cassettes. Puppet shows are also organized in order to teach children ways towards peace. Where the terrain did not allow the Mobile Library to pass, books were loaded onto a donkey, a "library on donkeys", in order to reach outlying homes in the hills. According to a professor of Middle Eastern history, Sheila Katz

The library touched thousands of families over the next three decades, teaching traditions of nonviolence and peace in Islam to empower participation in social change.

One estimate puts the number of people which have been reached by LOWNP's work at some 50,000 people over the two decades. In 2009 alone Assaily visited 83 villages and lent some 11426 books to 1496 children in the Hebron area.

In time Assaily's work received funding from organisations like the World Health Organization, Pax Christi, Caritas Internationalis and Misereor, which enabled him in 2007 to branch out by developing a subsidiary Books Along the Divide service in order to furnish with reading materials young Palestinians, in taxis and buses, who found themselves obliged to wait for long periods to pass many of the 540 Israeli checkpoints. The material consists of texts on non-violence, biographies of Moses, Joseph and Jesus and works penned by Gandhi.

=== First Intifada ===
Assaily's research on pamphleteering in the several months following the outbreak of the First Intifada, according to which, of the 17 leaflets circulating, 163 actions were called for, and of the 17 methods advocated for resisting the occupation, 26 were non-violent, has been cited by historians such as Mark Tessler, Samuel J. Eldersveld Collegiate Professor, Philip Mattar and others in comprehensive studies of Palestinians and the Israeli-Palestinian conflict. Of that intifada, which formally endorsed recourse to means of non-violent resistance against the occupation, Assaily stated that, "In 1967 they (Israel) defeated the armies of three countries in six days, but they [could not] defeat the intifadah." The lesson he drew was that Israel had a harder time coping with non-violent opposition than with an actual war.

=== Practical techniques of non-violent resistance ===
Assaily recounts episodes of how he advises people struck by settler violence to respond:

Once Israeli soldiers razed all the trees in a community's olive grove. So I convened all of the families involved and told them that the proper response was not to react violently but to persevere. They had to replant the trees. The first time they did this, all of the seedlings were torn out once more, but on the second occasion we did things differently. To replant them again we bided our time until Israel celebrated the Earth Day festival, when everyone plants a tree. I invited everyone to set about planting trees on that day and no one could raise objections, given the occasion. In the end the soldiers let us keep our trees in exchange for an undertaking to no longer plant any more trees. This was a good result, achieved without any need to throw stones, something which would have given them a pretext for attacking the (local) population. (Note: " 'Una volta i militari israeliani hanno abbattuto tutti gli alberi di ulivo di una comunità', continua l'educatore di strada, come ama definirsi Nafez, 'allora ho radunato le famiglie coinvolte e ho detto loro che la risposta non era la violenza, ma la perseveranza. Bisognava ripiantare gli alberi. La prima volta tutte le piante sono state sradicate nuovamente, ma la seconda volta abbiamo agito diversamente. Per piantarle abbiamo aspettato la Festa della Terra in Israele, giorno in cui tutti piantano alberi. Ho invitato le persone a piantare alberi e nessuno poteva dirci nulla, perché c'era la festa. I soldati alla fine hanno accettato di lasciare gli alberi al loro posto in cambio dell'impegno a non piantarne di nuovi. Un buon risultato, ottenuto senza bisogno di lanciare pietre che avrebbero dato la scusa per attaccare la popolazione.'")

Another method is to ask children to bring to school Fanta or Coca-Cola bottles, or cans, (Note: "Dann setzt sich Nafez Assaily, Leiter der 'Bücherei auf Rädern', mit den Jungen und Mädchen in einen Kreis. Sie erzählen sich Geschichten, die sie selbst erfinden. Sehr viel lauter geht es zu, wenn gemeinsam musiziert wird. Musikinstrumente stehen dafür nicht zur Verfügung. Manchmal ist es eine Sammlung alter gebrauchter Dosen, die - mit unterschiedlich großen Steinen gefüllt - zu eindrucksvollen Rasseln werden.") and then to fill them with pebbles, customarily used in throwing stones at the Israeli soldiers. The purpose of the exercise is to show children how to make a rudimentary musical instrument, in this case a maraca. He advises them to use these musical devices in front of Israeli soldiers manning checkpoints, rather than throwing stones at them.

=== Peaceful resistance to the confiscation of his property ===
Nafez lives on the northern outskirts of Hebron. His land lay some 70 metres south of the Givat Harsina Israeli settlement, and his home 100 metres away. In response to the first Intifada, Harsina settlers built a security fence, and then, in 2000 gradually expanded, felling the olive trees and levelling the ground until the encroachment ran close up to his home. The land yielded him and his neighbours income from the grape and olive harvests, but lay under a confiscation order. In February 2004 further incursions by Harsina settlers encroached on his land: part of the vineyard was rendered inaccessible by the erection of a fence, and he coulde not obtain permission from the Israeli soldiers to cross over to the other part of his vineyard. Soldiers threatening him, he claims, with a nighttime visit to smash his head, if he persisted in pruning his vineyard on the encroached parcel of land. Two members of the Christian Peacemaker Teams stayed overnight to ensure his safety. As a result of the fencing he was forced to detour some 2 kilometres on foot every day to reach his home, passing through two Israeli checkpoints. He can no longer access his home by car. (Note: "Im Sommer lebe ich in Hebron. Mein Haus liegt etwa 100 Meter südlich der Siedlung Harsina. Früher, in den späten 80ern, während der ersten Intifada, haben sie einen Sicherheitszaun um Harsina herum gebaut. Später, seit 2000, haben sie den Sicherheitsbereich um die Siedlung langsam ausgedehnt und heute steht der Grenzzaun nur wenige Meter von meinem Haus entfernt. Das Land gehörte mir und einigen Nachbarn und wir haben dort Wein und Oliven angebaut. Sie haben uns das Land einfach weggenommen, die Bäume gefällt und das Feld planiert. Ich verstehe das Bedürfnis nach Sicherheit der Siedler. Ich verstehe auch, dass sie uns unser Land deswegen wegnehmen. Was ich aber nicht verstehe ist, dass ich jeden Tag zwei Kilometer von meinem Auto nach Hause laufen und dabei zwei israelische Checkpoints passieren muss. Östlich von meinem Haus verläuft die Straße, die Harsina und die Siedlung Kiryat Arba weiter im Süden verbindet. Das Land neben der Straße haben sie auch konfisziert, und Palästinenser können die Straße nur an den Checkpoints überqueren oder einen großen Umweg um die Siedlungen herum machen. Ich muss mein Auto jenseits der Straße parken, mit allem Gepäck durch die beiden Checkpoints und dann zwei Kilometer zu Fuß gehen. Wenn wir Material brauchen, um unsere Häuser zu reparieren, müssen wir es tragen. Es gibt keine Möglichkeit, mit dem Auto zu unseren Häusern zu gelangen.") Assaily eventually obtained a stop-work injunction from an Israeli court to block the continuation of works that aimed to fence off his property.

== Non-violence is the key to peace ==
Speaking of Palestinians generally, Assaily argues that their principle virtue is patience, but that their great defect is the slowness with which they take on fresh ideas. (Note: "Nous, les Palestiniens, on a de la patience, c'est notre principale qualité. Notre gros défaut c'est que l'on absorbe très lentement les idées nouvelles.".)

His peace-campaigning is ecumenical, in that it draws on the writings of Gandhi, the Qur'an, the Torah and the New Testament. He often works to advise Palestinians demonstrating in Jerusalem on how to devise slogans that are less generic, and more in keeping with the realities of their everyday life. Jerry Levin, CNN's former Middle East Bureau Chief before he was taken hostage by Lebanese terrorists, and now member of the Christian Peacemaker Teams in the West Bank, has singled him out as a "creative Muslim exponent of non-violent activism". His long time friend Hussein Ibrahim Issa also collaborates on the project. At the outset their fellow Palestinians suspected he and his friends must be either CIA agents or collaborators with the Israelis. Issa had his house where he had set up a kindergarten, firebombed in 1988 for organizing an encounter between Palestinian and Israeli schoolchildren.

In Assaily's view, since 1948 both Israel and the Palestinians have been unsuccessful in pursuit of their respective goals. Israel in trying to achieve peace and security through the exercise of force, the Palestinians by recourse to armed struggle, therefore, he argues, the time has come for non-violent pursuit of their respective goals.

Only the Palestinians can give them peace. The US can give them money and weapons but not peace. And the only people who can give us peace are the Israelis. The Arabs can give us money and weapons, but they can not give us peace. We must act on these two facts. More nonviolence, more effectiveness.

He continues to expound the philosophy of non-violence, and makes frequent appearances abroad as a lecturer. He was one of the five people featured in Lynn Feinerman's film, If You Make It Possible.

Pacifism has emerged from many distinct religious confessions the world over and Assaily is numbered as an influential Palestinian Sufi exponent.

== Personal life ==
He lost the use of sight in his right eye, following his participation in a protest rally at the Al Aqsa mosque compound in 1991. Assaily had, as of 2002, six children.

== See also ==
- Pacifism in Islam
- List of peace activists

== Sources ==
- Assaily, Nafez. "Library on Wheels for Non-Violence and Peace". Pax Christi International.
- Assaily, Nafez (2004). "Message de Nafez Assaily". France-Palestine Solidarity Association.
- Assaily, Nafez (2005). "Über Häuserzerstörung in Israel und den Alltag in Hebron "Warum bestraft uns die Armee?"" (in German). Netzwerk Friedenskooperative.
- Assaily, Nafez (2009). "Nafez Assaily". Mepeace org.
- Assaily, Nafez; Rigby, Andrew (1991). "The Intifada". In Anderson, Shelley; Larmore, Janet (eds.). Nonviolent Struggle and Social Defence. War Resisters' International. ISBN 978-0-903517-14-0.
- Baron, Virginia (June 1990). "If It's Time for Peace, Who Will Make It Happen?". Fellowship. Vol. 56, no. 6. pp. 11–12. ProQuest 2041863.
- Burrowes, Robert J. (1997). Strategy of Nonviolent Defense, the: A Gandhian Approach. SUNY Press. ISBN 978-0-791-49808-8.
- Clayborne, Carson; Jackson, Troy (2017). "Martin Luther King, Jr's Hope for a Better Israel". In Cannon, Mae Elise (ed.). A Land Full of God: Christian Perspectives on the Holy Land. Wipf and Stock. pp. 99–107. ISBN 978-1-498-29881-0.
- De Vries, Minke (2018). Verso una gratuità feconda. L'avventura ecumenica di Grandchamp. Lutterworth Press. ISBN 978-0-718-84760-9.
- Elia, Christian (20 April 2005). "Testardo come un mulo: La storia di Nafez Assaily, un pacifista palestinese". Peacereporter.net.
- Fazzini, Lorenzo (24 July 2010). "IL CASO. Palestina, ai check point arrivano i libri". L'avvenire.
- Fletcher, Elaine Ruth (1 January 1996). "Bay Area filmmaker's vision of Middle East". SFGate.
- Gorenberg, Gershom (6 April 2009). "The Missing Mahatma". The Weekly Standard. Archived from the original on 28 August 2018.
- Gorenberg, Gershom (1 April 2011). "New Heroes for Old". Artforum International. Archived from the original on 29 August 2018 – via HighBeam Research.
- Hertog, Katrien (June 2010). "Library on Wheels for Non-violence and Peace Association LOWNP: Study on Best Practices of Active Non-violence". Maaber.
- Katz, Sheila H. (2016). Connecting with the Enemy: A Century of Palestinian-Israeli Joint Nonviolence. University of Texas Press. ISBN 978-1-477-31062-5.
- Kaufman, Edward; Hassassian, Manuel (2015). "Understanding our Israeli Palestinian Conflict and Searching for its Resolution". In Carter, Judy; Irani, George; Volkan, Vamik D. (eds.). Regional and Ethnic Conflicts: Perspectives from the Front Lines. Routledge. pp. 97–129. ISBN 978-1-317-34466-7.
- Kuhne, Elke; Schäfer, Peter (24 December 2003). "Nafez Botschaft der Toleranz: In Palästina unterstützt Weltfriedensdienst die "Bücherei auf Rädern"". Neues Deutschland.
- Levin, Jerry (2005). West Bank Diary: Middle East Violence as Reported by a Former American Hostage. Pasadena: Hope Publishing House. ISBN 978-1-932717-03-7 – via Internet Archive.
- Mattar, Philip (2005). Encyclopedia of the Palestinians. Infobase Publishing. ISBN 978-0-816-06986-6.
- Moore, Jennifer (2012). Humanitarian Law in Action Within Africa. Oxford University Press. ISBN 978-0-199-85696-1.
- "Nafez Assaily Profile" (PDF). Caritas.
- Nicoletta, Flora (1995). Le pietre dell'Intifada (in Italian). Rubbettino. ISBN 978-88-7284-318-5.
- "Palestinian non-violence mobile library seeks funds in Europe". Ma'an News Agency. 30 October 2006.
- Robinson, Walter V. (12 October 1990). "Jerusalem echoes with bitterness, rage for many on both sides, control of the Holy City is the most intractable issue". The Boston Globe. Boston, MA. Archived from the original on 29 August 2018 – via HighBeam Research.
- Schilling, David M. (1989). "To Be Steadfast for Peace". Fellowship. 55 (3): 16–19. ProQuest 2041863.
- Schwartzbrod, Alexandra (28 August 2002). "Un 'Gandhi' palestinien à Hébron". Libération (in French).
- "Soldiers prevent access to Nafez Assaily's vineyard". Christian Peacemaker Teams. 8 March 2004.
- Sommer, Allison Kaplan (18 December 1995). "Putting a Face on Peace". The Jerusalem Post.
- Tessler, Mark (2009). A History of the Israeli-Palestinian Conflict. Indiana University Press. ISBN 978-0-253-01346-0.
- Vinthagen, Stellan (2015). A Theory of Nonviolent Action: How Civil Resistance Works. Zed Books. ISBN 978-1-780-32053-3.
- Walz, L. Humphrey (May 1988). "Awad Holding on in Jerusalem Peace Center". Washington Report on Middle East Affairs. pp. 15–16.
- Zunes, Stephen (September 1994). "Unarmed Insurrections against Authoritarian Governments in the Third World: A New Kind of Revolution". Third World Quarterly. 15 (2): 403–426. doi:10.1080/01436599408420388. JSTOR 3993292.
