= Islam and war =

Interaction between religion and warfare

From the time of Muhammad, the final prophet of Islam, many Muslim states and empires have been involved in warfare. The concept of Jihad, the religious duty to struggle, has long been associated with struggles for promoting a religion, although some observers refer to such struggle as "the lesser jihad" by comparison with inner spiritual striving. Islamic jurisprudence on war differentiates between illegitimate and legitimate warfare and prescribes proper and improper conduct by combatants. Numerous conquest wars as well as armed anti-colonial military campaigns were waged as jihads.

== Islamic concepts concerning war ==
Islamic concepts concerning war refer to what have been accepted in Sharia (Islamic law) and Fiqh (Islamic jurisprudence) by Ulama (Islamic scholars) as the correct Islamic manner which is expected to be obeyed by Muslims in times of war. Some scholars and Muslim religious figures claim that armed struggle based on Islamic principles is referred to as the Lesser jihad. Fighting is justified for legitimate self-defense, to aid other Muslims, and after a violation in the terms of a treaty; but should be stopped if these circumstances cease to exist. War should be conducted in a disciplined way, to avoid injuring non-combatants, with the minimum necessary force, without anger and with humane treatment towards prisoners of war.

== History ==
=== Early instances ===
The earliest forms of warfare by Muslims occurred after the migration (hijra) of Muhammad and his small group of followers to Medina from Mecca and the conversion of several inhabitants of the city to Islam. At this time, Muslims had been persecuted and oppressed by the Meccans. There were still Muslims who could not flee from Mecca and were still oppressed because of their faith. The Meccans also refused to let the Muslims enter Mecca and by that denied them access to the Ka'aba.

Major battles in the history of Islam arose between the Meccans and the Muslims; one of the most important to the latter was the Battle of Badr in 624 AD. Other early battles included battles in Uhud (625), Khandaq (627), Mecca (630), Khaybar (628) and Hunayn (630). These battles, especially Uhud was unsuccessful in comparison to the Battle of Badr. In relating this battle, the Qu'ran states that Allah sent an "unseen army of angels" that helped the Muslims defeat the Meccans.

=== Warfare by Islamic forces before 1918 ===
==== Islam in the Iberian Peninsula ====
The Umayyad conquest of Hispania was the initial expansion of the Umayyad Caliphate over Hispania (in the Iberian Peninsula) from 711 to 718. The conquest resulted in the destruction of the Visigothic Kingdom and the establishment of the Umayyad Wilayah of Al-Andalus. The conquest marks the westernmost expansion of both the Umayyad Caliphate and Muslim rule into Europe. The conquest was followed by a period of several hundred years during which most of the Iberian peninsula was known as Al-Andalus, dominated by Muslim rulers. Only a handful of new small Christian realms managed to reassert their authority across the faraway mountainous north of the peninsula. The medieval Iberian Peninsula was the scene of almost constant warfare between the Muslim al-Andalus (and later Taifas) and Christian kingdoms.

The Almohad Dynasty was a Berber, Muslim dynasty that was founded in the 12th century, and conquered all Northern Africa as far as Libya, together with Al-Andalus (Moorish Iberian Peninsula). The Almohads, who declared an everlasting Jihad against the Christians, far surpassed the Almoravides in fundamentalist outlook, and they treated the dhimmis harshly. Faced with the choice of either death or conversion, many Jews and Christians emigrated.

The Almohads soon embarked in a campaign to destroy the Catholic kingdoms in the Iberian Peninsula and beyond. Outnumbered, the defending army led by King Alfonso VIII of Castile, defeated Muhammad al-Nasir near Las Navas de Tolosa in 1212. Las Navas de Tolosa is sought as the turning point of the Reconquista and the end of the Muslim dominance in the Iberian Peninsula. In 1492, the Granada War marked the end of the Reconquista, resulting in the defeat of the Emirate of Granada, ending all of Islamic rule in the Iberian peninsula.

==== Crusades ====
European crusaders re-conquered much of the territory seized by the Islamic state, dividing it into four kingdoms, the most important being the Kingdom of Jerusalem. The Crusades originally had the goal of recapturing Jerusalem and the Holy Land (former Christian territory) from Muslim rule and were originally launched in response to a call from the Eastern Orthodox Byzantine Empire for help against the expansion of the Muslim Seljuk Turks into Anatolia. There was little drive to retake the lands from the crusaders, save the few attacks made by the Egyptian Fatimids. This changed, however, with the first recorded use of jihad during the Battle of Sarmada in 1119, where a united Muslim army under the Turkish warlord Ilghazi were victorious over Outremer's force, destabilising the Principality of Antioch by killing their leader, Roger. Though, the first instance where jihad was effectively used against the Crusaders to regain land was with the coming of Zangi, ruler of what is today northern Iraq. He took Edessa, which triggered the Second Crusade, which was little more than a 47-year stalemate. The stalemate was ended with the victory of Salah al-Din al-Ayyubi (known in the west as Saladin) over the forces of Jerusalem at the Horns of Hattin in 1187. It was during the course of the stalemate that a great deal of literature regarding Jihad was written. While amassing his armies in Syria, Saladin had to create a doctrine which would unite his forces and make them fight until the bitter end, which would be the only way they could re-conquer the lands taken in the First Crusade. It stated that any one who would abandon the Jihad would be committing a sin that could not be washed away by any means. It also put his amirs at the center of power, just under his rule.

==== South Asia ====
Sir Jadunath Sarkar contends that several Muslim invaders were waging a systematic Jihad against Hindus in India to the effect that "Every device short of massacre in cold blood was resorted to in order to convert heathen subjects." In particular the records kept by al-Utbi, Mahmud al-Ghazni's secretary, in the Tarikh-i-Yamini document several episodes of bloody military campaigns. In the late tenth century, a story spread that before Muhammad destroyed the idols at the Kaaba, that of Manāt was secretly sent to a Hindu temple in India; and the place was renamed as So-Manāt or Somnath. Acting on this, the Shiva idol at the Somnath temple was destroyed in a raid by Mahmud Ghazni in CE 1024; which is considered the first act of Jihad in India. In 1527, Babur ordered a Jihad against Rajputs and Meenas at the battle of Khanwa. Publicly addressing his men, he declared the forthcoming battle a Jihad. His soldiers were facing a non-Muslim army for the first time ever. This, he said, was their chance to become either a Ghazi (soldier of Islam) or a Shaheed (Martyr of Islam).

In 1567, Babur's grandson Akbar declared Jihad against the Sisodiya ruler Uday Singh and beiseged his capital in October 1567. The garrison of Chittor was slaughtered to the last men and the city was taken after a gallant resistance by the defenders. After the fort was captured, the inhabitants of Chittor numbered around 30,000 were massacred and the rest were enslaved. Akbar, proclaimed the conquest of Chittor as victory of Islam over the idolaters and issued a victory letter expressing about his victory in sentiments of Islamic inconoclasm.

Akbar's grandson emperor Aurangzeb waged a Jihad against those identified as heterodox within India's Islamic community, such as Shi'a Muslims.

==== Barbary Pirates ====
After the Spanish reconquered Granada from the Moors in 1492, many Moors exiled from the Spanish Inquisition fled to North Africa. After attacks against Spanish shipping took place from North Africa, the Spanish retaliated by seizing Oran, Algiers, and Tunis. By 1518, the pirates were serving in the navies of North African Sultans, conducting activities that included attacks on enemy (especially Christian) trade and raiding European coastlines for potential slaves. However, by 1587, their activity became much more decentralized, and more like traditional piracy.

Much of the Barbary activity was funded through the enslavement of European Christians. In the beginning of the 17th Century, there were more than 20,000 captives to be sold into slavery in Algiers alone. Although people from all over Christendom suffered Barbary attacks, the people who were the most likely victims were from Sicily. However, any Christian nation that refused to pay tribute to Islam and either the Sultanate of Morocco, Eyalet of Tripolitania, or the Regency of Algiers could have been subject to attack.

In 1800, the Eyalet of Tripolitania demanded an increase of tribute in order to "prevent" future attacks against the fledgling United States. However, the U.S. refused to pay the tribute, and this led to the First Barbary War. When the U.S. defeated the Tripolitanians in the Battle of Derne in 1805, the two nations signed a treaty that had favorable terms for the United States. However, a resurgence in Barbary attacks in 1815 led to the U.S. Navy being used again in the Second Barbary War, which also resulted in a US victory and the ceasing of all Barbary attacks on American shipping without tribute.

==== Ottoman Empire ====
Upon succeeding his father, Suleiman the Magnificent began a series of military conquests in Europe. On August 29, 1526, he defeated Louis II of Hungary (1516–26) at the battle of Mohács. In its wake, Hungarian resistance collapsed and the Ottoman Empire became the preeminent power in South-Eastern Europe. In July 1683 Sultan Mehmet IV proclaimed a Jihad and the Turkish grand vizier, Kara Mustafa Pasha, laid siege to Vienna with an army of 138,000 men.

On November 14, 1914, in Constantinople, capital of the Ottoman Empire, the religious leader Sheikh-ul-Islam declares Jihad on behalf of the Ottoman government, urging Muslims all over the world—including in the Allied countries—to take up arms against Britain, Russia, France, Serbia and Montenegro in World War I. On the other hand, Sheikh Hussein bin Ali, Sharif of Mecca, refused to accommodate Ottoman requests that he endorse this jihad, a requirement that was necessary were a jihad to become popular, due to British pressure and on the grounds that:

the Holy War was doctrinally incompatible with an aggressive war, and absurd with a Christian ally: Germany

==== Central Asia and Afghanistan ====
Ahmad Shah, founder of the Durrani Empire, declared a jihad against the Marathas, and warriors from various Pashtun tribes, as well as other tribes answered his call. The Third battle of Panipat (January 1761), fought between largely Muslim and largely Hindu armies who numbered as many as 100,000 troops each, was waged along a twelve-kilometre front, and resulted in a victory for Ahmad Shah.

In response to the Hazara uprising of 1892, the Afghan Emir Abdur Rahman Khan declared a "Jihad" against the Shiites. The large army defeated the rebellion at its center, in Oruzgan, by 1892 and the local population was severely massacred. According to S. A. Mousavi, "thousands of Hazara men, women, and children were sold as slaves in the markets of Kabul and Qandahar, while numerous towers of human heads were made from the defeated rebels as a warning to others who might challenge the rule of the Amir". Until the 20th century, some Hazaras were still kept as slaves by the Pashtuns; although Amanullah Khan banned slavery in Afghanistan during his reign, the tradition carried on unofficially for many more years.

==== Wahabbists ====
The Saudi Salafi sheiks were convinced that it was their religious mission to wage Jihad against all other forms of Islam. In 1801 or 1802, the Saudi Wahhabists under Abdul Aziz ibn Muhammad ibn Saud attacked and captured the holy Shia cities of Karbala and Najaf in Iraq, massacred the Shiites and destroyed the tombs of the Shiite Imam Husayn and Ali bin Abu Talib. In 1802 they overtook Taif. In 1803 and 1804 the Wahhabis overtook Mecca and Medina.

=== Fulani jihads (West Africa) ===
The Fula or Fulani jihads, were a series of independent but loosely connected events across West Africa between the late 17th century and European colonization, in which Muslim Fulas took control of various parts of the region. Between 1750 and 1900, one-third to two-thirds of the entire population of the Fulani jihad states consisted of slaves.

=== Anti-colonial warfare in Muslim areas ===
==== Caucasus ====
In 1784, Imam Sheikh Mansur, a Chechen warrior and Muslim mystic, led a coalition of Muslim Caucasian tribes from throughout the Caucasus in a ghazavat, or holy war, against the Russian invaders. Sheikh Mansur was captured in 1791 and died in the Schlüsselburg Fortress. Avarian Islamic scholar Ghazi Muhammad preached that Jihad would not occur until the Caucasians followed Sharia completely rather than following a mixture of Islamic laws and adat (customary traditions). By 1829, Mullah began proselytizing and claiming that obeying Sharia, giving zakat, prayer, and hajj would not be accepted by Allah if the Russians were still present in the area. He even went on to claim that marriages would become void and children bastards if any Russians were still in the Caucasus. In 1829 he was proclaimed imam in Ghimry, where he formally made the call for a holy war. In 1834, Ghazi Muhammad died at the battle of Ghimri, and Imam Shamil took his place as the premier leader of the Caucasian resistance. Imam Shamil succeeded in accomplishing what Sheik Mansur had started: to unite North Caucasian highlanders in their struggle against the Russian Empire. He was a leader of anti-Russian resistance in the Caucasian War and was the third Imam of Dagestan and Chechnya (1834–1859).

==== Mahdists in Sudan ====
During the 1870s, European initiatives against the slave trade caused an economic crisis in northern Sudan, precipitating the rise of Mahdist forces. Muhammad Ahmed Al Mahdi was a religious leader, who proclaimed himself the Mahdi—the prophesied redeemer of Islam who will appear at end times—in 1881, and declared a Jihad against Ottoman rulers. He declared all "Turks" infidels and called for their execution. The Mahdi raised an army and led a successful religious war to topple the Ottoman-Egyptian occupation of Sudan. Victory created an Islamic state, one that quickly reinstituted slavery in Sudan. In the West he is most famous for defeating and later killing British general Charles George Gordon, in the fall of Khartoum.

==== Afghanistan ====
The First Anglo-Afghan War (1838–42) was one of Britain's most ill-advised and disastrous wars. William Brydon was the sole survivor of the invading British army of 16,500 soldiers and civilians.

The Soviet invasion of Afghanistan was also a disaster and considered to be their "Vietnam". The invasion and atrocities compelled the west into providing aid to the mujaheddin. The Russian invasion was also the historical event that provoked Osama bin Laden into migrating to Afghanistan in 1979, the same year he graduated from University.

As in the earlier wars against the British and Soviets, Afghan Resistance to the American invaders took the traditional form of a Muslim holy war against the infidels.

During September 2002, the remnants of the Taliban forces began a recruitment drive in Pashtun areas in both Afghanistan and Pakistan to launch a renewed "jihad" or holy war against the pro-Western Afghan government and the US-led coalition. Pamphlets distributed in secret during the night also began to appear in many villages in the former Taliban heartland in southeastern Afghanistan that called for jihad. Small mobile training camps were established along the border with Pakistan by al-Qaeda and Taliban fugitives to train new recruits in guerrilla warfare and terrorist tactics, according to Afghan sources and a United Nations report.

Most of the new recruits were drawn from the madrassas or religious schools of the tribal areas of Pakistan, from which the Taliban had originally arisen. The insurgency continued in the form of the Taliban guerrilla war, up until its conclusion in 2021 following the withdrawal of U.S forces.

Although there is no evidence that the CIA directly supported the Taliban or Al Qaeda, some basis for military support of the Taliban was provided when, in the early 1980s, the CIA and the ISI (Pakistan's Interservices Intelligence Agency) provided arms to Afghan mujahideens resisting the Soviet invasion of Afghanistan, and the ISI assisted the process of gathering radical Muslims from around the world to fight against the Soviets. Osama bin Laden was one of the key players in organizing training camps for the foreign Muslim volunteers.

The Soviets completely withdrew from Afghanistan by 1989, ending a war which had become an embarrassment for politicians in Moscow.

==== Algeria ====
In 1830, Algeria was invaded by France; French colonial domination over Algeria supplanted what had been domination in name by the Ottoman Empire. Within two years, Abd al-Qādir was made an amir and with the loyalty of a number of tribes began a jihad against the French. He was effective at using guerrilla warfare and for a decade, up until 1842, scored many victories. He was noted for his chivalry. On December 21, 1847, Abd al-Qādir was forced to surrender.

Abd al-Qādir is recognized and venerated as the first hero of Algerian independence. Not without cause, his green and white standard was adopted by the Algerian Liberation Front during the War of Independence and became the national flag of independent Algeria.

The Algerian Civil War (1991–2002) was an armed conflict between the Algerian government and various Islamist rebel groups which began in 1991. By 1997, the organized jihad in Algeria had disintegrated into criminal thuggery and Algeria was wracked by massacres of intense brutality and unprecedented size.

=== Southeast Asia ===
In 1527, an invasion from the Demak Sultanate caused the destruction of the Hindu and Buddhist Majapahit empire. The Cham Muslims under Katip Suma declared a Jihad against the Vietnamese invasion of Champa in 1832 under Emperor Minh Mang.

=== China ===
Turkic Kokandi Uzbek Muslim forces under Yaqub Beg declared a Jihad against Chinese Muslims under T'o Ming during the Dungan revolt. Yaqub Beg enlisted non Muslim Han Chinese militia under Hsu Hsuehkung in order to fight against the Chinese Muslims. T'o Ming's forces were defeated by Yaqub, who planned to conquer Dzungharia. Yaqub intended to seize all Dungan territory.

The Boxer Rebellion was considered a Jihad by the Muslim Kansu Braves in the Chinese Imperial Army under Dong Fuxiang, fighting against the Eight-Nation Alliance.

Jihad was declared obligatory and a religious duty for all Chinese Muslims against Japan after 1937 during the Second Sino-Japanese War.

=== Axis Europe ===
Among the Nazi leadership, the greatest interest in the idea of creating Muslim units under German command was shown by Heinrich Himmler, who viewed the Islamic world as a potential ally against the British Empire. Himmler had a romantic vision of Islam as a faith ‘fostering fearless soldiers’, and this probably played a significant role in his decision to raise three Muslim divisions under German leadership in the Balkans from Bosnian Muslims and Albanians: the Waffen SS 13th Handschar ("Knife"), the 23rd Kama ("Dagger") and the 21st Skenderbeg, although only Handschar reached full division strength. The Skenderbeg was an Albanian unit of around 4,000 men, and the Kama was composed of Muslims from Bosnia, containing 3,793 men at its peak. The Handschar was the largest unit, around 20,000 Bosnian Muslim volunteers. Recruitment was aided by the Grand Mufti of Jerusalem Haj Amin al-Husseini, who fled from British-controlled Palestine in 1941 to Baghdad and then to Berlin. He participated in the German war effort "by broadcasting anti-British, jihadist propaganda to the Middle East and by recruiting Bosnian Muslims" for the German Armed Forces or Wehrmacht.

The Encyclopedia of the Holocaust states "These Muslim volunteer units, called Handschar, were put in Waffen SS units, fought Yugoslav partisans in Bosnia and carried out police and security duties in Hungary. They participated in the massacre of civilians in Bosnia and volunteered to join in the hunt for Jews in Croatia." Part of the division also escorted Hungarian Jews from the forced labor in mine in Bor on their way back to Hungary. "The division was also employed against Serbs, who as Orthodox Christians were seen by the Bosnian Muslims as enemies." Husseini asked that Muslim divisional operations to be restricted to the defense of the Moslem heartland of Bosnia and Herzegovina. The Handschar earned a repute for brutality in ridding north-eastern Bosnia of Serbs and partisans: many local Muslims, observing the violence, were driven to go over to the communist partisans. Once redeployed outside Bosnia, and as the fortunes of war turned, mass defections and desertions took place, and Volksdeutsche were drafted to replace the losses.

There were at least 70,000 Bosnian Muslims captured by the British. Some of these Muslim ex-soldiers participated in aiding Arabs in the 1948 Arab-Israeli war.

== See also ==
- Islam and violence
- Islamic Military Counter Terrorism Coalition
- Islamic terrorism
- Mujahideen
- Violence in the Quran

=== Political and military aspects ===
- Political aspects of Islam
- Islamism
- Muhammad as a general

=== Related concepts ===
- Crusade
- Holy war
- Religious wars
- List of wars and battles in pre-Islamic Arabia
