= Justice in the Quran =

Aspect of the Quran

Justice is a central theme in the Qur’an, dictating the traditions of law and how they should be put into practice. There are two ways in which justice operates: in a legal sense and in a divine sense. Regarding justice in the legal sense, the Qur’an tells Muslims not only how to conduct themselves, but is also highly important regarding relationships with other people. It states what the various punishments for certain crimes should be along with the justification behind this reasoning. Furthermore, the Qur’an brings across the idea that anyone who propagates the message of justice and acts accordingly will be justly rewarded with their place in jannah. With regard to divine justice, there has been a discourse between many commentators debating how justice will be fulfilled for different people, although all agree that Allah shall not do any injustice. The Qur’an repeatedly emphasizes that Allah does not wrong anyone even by an atom’s weight (Qur’an 4:40). While non-Muslims may receive reward for their good deeds in this worldly life, the Qur’an is explicit that ultimate salvation in the Hereafter is conditional upon faith in Allah and His final Messenger. For instance, it says: 'And We will regard what they have done of deeds and make them as dust dispersed' (Qur’an 25:23). Classical commentators such as Ibn Kathir explain that the verse (2:62) about Jews, Christians, and Sabians refers to those among them who truly followed their prophets before the advent of Prophet Muhammad ﷺ, but after his coming, faith in him became essential for acceptance in the Hereafter ...essential for acceptance in the Hereafter. 3

., and from these verses, it can be inferred directly that Creator i.e. Allah has nothing to do with religious background but the good deeds of the actor will always be rewarded both in this world and hereafter too, enshrining the justice for all by Allah.

== Justice ==
Originally the Concept of Justice within the Qur’an was a broad term that applied to the individual. Over time, Islamic thinkers thought to unify political, legal and social justice which made Justice a major interpretive theme within the Qur'an. Justice can be seen as the exercise of reason and free will or the practice of judgment and responsibility. The practices and exercises were guided by two Islamic words: Huquq (rights) or obligations one owes and Hsan (generosity beyond obligation). These words created a guideline for Muslims to abide by.

“Central to the prophetic conception of justice are three features: relationships among men and toward God are reciprocal in nature, and justice exists where this reciprocity guides all interaction; justice is both a process and a result of equating otherwise dissimilar entities; and because relationships are highly contextual, justice is to be grasped through its multifarious enactments rather than as a single abstract principle.”

The Qur'an places great emphasis on knowledge, and the pursuit thereof, as valuable (49:9), but links the intellectual well-being of people to a profound awareness of God and justice, and emphasizes the compatibility of knowledge with faith (35:28, 05:89, 58:11).

Justice assumes such prominence in the Qur˒an that it is regarded as one of the reasons why God created the earth. The demands that the Quran makes upon individuals to uphold justice and oaths is extraordinary, transcending all bonds of family and society. While justice is something that one demands for oneself, more importantly, it is something to be fulfilled for others, regardless of the cost to oneself, one's relatives or one's own community.

- And eat up not one another's property unjustly (in any illegal way e.g. stealing, robbing, deceiving, etc.), nor give bribery to the rulers (judges before presenting your cases) that you may knowingly eat up a part of the property of others sinfully. Sura Al-Baqara:188 (2:188)
- Allah will not punish you for the oaths you make accidentally, but He will punish you for the oaths you make intentionally; for the expiation of oaths made or violated accidentally feed ten Masakin (poor persons), on a scale of the average of that with which you feed your own families; or clothe them; or manumit a slave. But whosoever cannot afford (that), then he should fast for three days. That is the expiation for the oaths that you have sworn or broken accidentally. So protect your intentional oaths as Allah has made it clear to you in His Ayat so that you may be grateful. Sura Al-Ma'ida:89 (5:89).
- Verily! Allah commands that you should render back the trusts to those to whom they are due; and that when you judge between men, you judge with justice. Verily, how excellent is the teaching which He (Allâh) gives you! Truly, Allâh is Ever All-Hearer, All-Seer. Sura An-Nisa:58 (4:58)
- But no, by your Lord, they can have no Faith, until they make you (O Muhammad) judge in all disputes between them, and find in themselves no resistance against your decisions, and accept (them) with full submission. Sura An-Nisa:65 (4:65)
- It is not for a believer to kill a believer except (that it be) by mistake; and whosoever kills a believer by mistake, (it is ordained that) he must set free a believing slave and a compensation (blood-money, i.e. Diya) be given to the deceased's family unless they remit it. If the deceased belonged to a people at war with you and he was a believer, the freeing of a believing slave (is prescribed); and if he belonged to a people with whom you have a treaty of mutual alliance, compensation (blood-money - Diya) must be paid to his family, and a believing slave must be freed. And who so finds this (the penance of freeing a slave) beyond his means, he must fast for two consecutive months in order to seek repentance from Allâh. And Allâh is Ever All-Knowing, All-Wise. Sura An-Nisa:92 (4:92)
- And whoever earns a fault or a sin and then throws it on to someone innocent, he has indeed burdened himself with falsehood and a manifest sin. Sura An-Nisa:112 (4:112)
- O ye who believe! Be ye staunch in justice, witnesses for Allah, even though it be against yourselves or (your) parents or (your) kindred, whether (the case be of) a rich man or a poor man, for Allah is nearer unto both (them ye are). So follow not passion lest ye lapse (from truth) and if ye lapse or fall away, then lo! Allah is ever Informed of what ye do. Sura An-Nisa 135 (4:135)
- O you who believe! Fulfil (your) obligations. Lawful to you (for food) are all the beasts of cattle except that which will be announced to you (herein), game (also) being unlawful when you assume Ihrâm for Hajj or ‘Umrah (pilgrimage). Verily, Allâh commands that which He wills. Sura Al-Ma'ida (5:1)
- And (as for) the male thief and the female thief, cut off (from the wrist joint) their (right) hands as a recompense for that which they committed, a punishment by way of example from Allâh. And Allâh is All-Powerful, All-Wise. Sura Al-Ma'ida:38 (5:38)
- (They like to) listen to falsehood, to devour anything forbidden. So if they come to you (O Muhammad), either judge between them, or turn away from them. If you turn away from them, they cannot hurt you in the least. And if you judge, judge with justice between them. Verily, Allâh loves those who act justly. Sura Al-Ma'ida:42 (5:42)
- But how do they come to you for decision while they have the Taurât (Torah), in which is the (plain) Decision of Allâh; yet even after that, they turn away. For they are not (really) believers. Sura Al-Ma'ida:43 (5:43)
- Verily, We did send down the Taurât (Torah) [to Mûsâ (Moses)], therein was guidance and light, by which the Prophets, who submitted themselves to Allâh’s Will, judged for the Jews. And the rabbis and the priests [too judged for the Jews by the Taurât (Torah) after those Prophets], for to them was entrusted the protection of Allâh’s Book, and they were witnesses thereto. Therefore fear not men but fear Me (O Jews) and sell not My Verses for a miserable price. And whosoever does not judge by what Allâh has revealed, such are the Kâfirûn (i.e. disbelievers - of a lesser degree as they do not act on Allâh’s Laws). Sura Al-Ma'ida:44 (5:44)
- And We ordained therein for them (The Jews): "Life for life, eye for eye, nose for nose, ear for ear, tooth for tooth, and wounds equal for equal." But if anyone remits the retaliation by way of charity, it shall be for him an expiation. And whosoever does not judge by that which Allâh has revealed, such are the Zâlimûn (polytheists and wrong-doers - of a lesser degree). Sura Al-Ma'ida:45 (5:45)
- Let the people of the Injeel (Gospel) judge by what Allâh has revealed therein. And whosoever does not judge by what Allâh has revealed (then) such (people) are the Fâsiqûn [the rebellious i.e. disobedient (of a lesser degree)] to Allâh. Sura Al-Ma'ida:47 (5:47)
- And so judge (you O Muhammad) among them by what Allâh has revealed and follow not their vain desires, but beware of them lest they turn you (O Muhammad) far away from some of that which Allâh has sent down to you. And if they turn away, then know that Allâh's Will is to punish them for some sins of theirs. And truly, most of men are Fâsiqûn (rebellious and disobedient to Allâh). Sura Al-Ma'ida:49 (5:49)
- Do they then seek the judgement of (the days of) Ignorance? (pre-Islam) And who is better in judgement than Allâh for a people who have firm Faith. Sura Al-Ma'ida:50 (5:50)
- O you who believe! Kill not the game while you are in a state of Ihrâm [for Hajj or ‘Umrah (pilgrimage)], and whosoever of you kills it intentionally, the penalty is an offering, brought to the Ka‘bah, of an eatable animal (i.e. sheep, goat, cow) equivalent to the one he killed, as adjudged by two just men among you; or, for expiation, he should feed Masâkîn (poor persons), or its equivalent in Saum (fasting), that he may taste the heaviness (punishment) of his deed. Allâh has forgiven what is past, but whosoever commits it again, Allâh will take retribution from him. And Allâh is All-Mighty, All-Able of Retribution. Sura Al-Ma'ida:59 (5:59)
- Say (O Muhammad): "I am on clear proof from my Lord (Islâmic Monotheism), but you deny it (the truth that has come to me from Allâh). I have not gotten what you are asking for impatiently (the torment). The decision is only for Allâh, He declares the truth, and He is the Best of judges." Sura Al-An'am:57 (6:57)
- Then they are returned to Allâh, their True Maulâ [True Master (God), the Just Lord (to reward them)]. Surely, for Him is the judgement and He is the Swiftest in taking account. Sura Al-An'am:62 (6:62)
- [Say (O Muhammad)] "Shall I seek a judge other than Allâh while it is He Who has sent down unto you the Book (the Qur’ân), explained in detail." Those unto whom We gave the Scripture [the Taurât (Torah) and the Injeel (Gospel)] know that it is revealed from your Lord in truth. So be not you of those who doubt. Sura Al-An'am:114 (6:114)
- And if there is a party of you who believe in that with which I have been sent and a party who do not believe, so be patient until Allâh judges between us, and He is the Best of judges. Sura Al-A'raf:87 (7:87)
- And others are made to await for Allâh's Decree, whether He will punish them or will forgive them. And Allâh is All-Knowing, All-Wise. Sura At-Tawba:106 (8:106)
- Say: "Is there of your (Allâh’s so-called) partners one that guides to the truth?" Say: "It is Allâh Who guides to the truth. Is then He Who guides to the truth more worthy to be followed, or he who finds not guidance (himself) unless he is guided? Then, what is the matter with you? How judge you?" Sura Yunus (Jonah):10 (10:35)
- And (O Muhammad), follow the revelation sent unto you, and be patient till Allâh gives judgement. And He is the Best of judges. Sura Yunus (Jonah):109 (10:109)
- And thus have We sent it (the Qur’ân) down to be a judgement of authority in Arabic. Were you (O Muhammad) to follow their (vain) desires after the knowledge which has come to you, then you will not have any Walî (protector) or Wâq (defender) against Allâh. Sura Ar-Ra'd:37 (13:37)
- See they not that We gradually reduce the land (of the disbelievers, by giving it to the believers, in war victories) from its outlying borders. And Allâh judges, there is none to put back His Judgement and He is Swift at reckoning. Sura Ar-Ra'd:41 (13:41)
- He hides himself from the people because of the evil of that whereof he has been informed. Shall he keep her with dishonour or bury her in the earth(female infanticide)? Certainly, evil is their decision. Sura An-Nahl:59 (16:59)
- The Sabbath was only prescribed for those who differed concerning it, and verily, your Lord will judge between them on the Day of Resurrection about that wherein they used to differ. Sura An-Nahl:124 (16:124)
- He (Muhammad) said: "My Lord! Judge You in truth! Our Lord is the Most Gracious, Whose Help is to be sought against that which you attribute (unto Allâh that He has offspring, and unto Muhammad that he is a sorcerer, and unto the Qur’ân that it is poetry)!" Sura Al-Anbiya (21:112)
- Never did We send a Messenger or a Prophet before you but when he did recite the revelation or narrated or spoke, Shaitân (Satan) threw (some falsehood) in it. But Allâh abolishes that which Shaitân (Satan) throws in. Then Allâh establishes His Revelations. And Allâh is All-Knower, All-Wise: Sura Al-Hajj:52 (22:52)
- The sovereignty on that Day will be that of Allâh (the One Who has no partners). He will judge between them. So those who believed (in the Oneness of Allâh - Islâmic Monotheism) and did righteous good deeds will be in Gardens of delight (Paradise). Sura Al-Hajj:56 (22:56)
- Allâh will judge between you on the Day of Resurrection about that wherein you used to differ." Sura Al-Hajj:59 (22:59)
- The only saying of the faithful believers, when they are called to Allâh (His Words, the Qur’ân) and His Messenger, to judge between them, is that they say: "We hear and we obey." And such are the successful (who will live forever in Paradise). Sura An-Nur:51 (24:51)
- Verily, your Lord will decide between them (various sects) by His Judgement. And He is the All-Mighty, the All-Knowing. Sura Ash-Shu'ara:78 (27:78)
- And He is Allâh: Lâ ilâha illa Huwa (none has the right to be worshipped but He), all praises and thanks be to Him (both) in the first (i.e. in this world) and in the last (i.e. in the Hereafter). And for Him is the Decision, and to Him shall you (all) be returned. Sura Al-Qisas (28:70)
- And invoke not any other ilâh (god) along with Allâh: Lâ ilâha illa Huwa (none has the right to be worshipped but He). Everything will perish save His Face. His is the Decision, and to Him you (all) shall be returned. Sura Al-Qisas (28:88)
- When they entered in upon Dâwûd (David), he was terrified of them. They said: "Fear not! (We are) two litigants, one of whom has wronged the other, therefore judge between us with truth, and treat us not with injustice, and guide us to the Right Way. Sura Sad:22 (38:22)
- O Dâwûd (David)! Verily! We have placed you as a successor on the earth; so judge you between men in truth (and justice) and follow not your desire - for it will mislead you from the Path of Allâh. Verily, those who wander astray from the Path of Allâh (shall) have a severe torment, because they forgot the Day of Reckoning. Sura Sad (38:26)
- Say (O Muhammad): "O Allâh! Creator of the heavens and the earth! All-Knower of the Ghaib (Unseen) and the seen! You will judge between your slaves about that wherein they used to differ." Sura Az-Zumar (39:46)
- So wait patiently (O Muhammad) for the Decision of your Lord, for verily, you are under Our Eyes; and glorify the Praises of your Lord when you get up from sleep Sura At-Tur (52:48)
- O you who believe! When believing women come to you as emigrants, examine them; Allâh knows best as to their Faith, then if you ascertain that they are true believers send them not back to the disbelievers. They are not lawful (wives) for the disbelievers nor are the disbelievers lawful (husbands) for them. But give them (the disbelievers) that (amount of money) which they have spent [as their Mahr][1] to them. And there will be no sin on you to marry them if you have paid their Mahr to them. Likewise hold not the disbelieving women as wives, and ask for (the return of) that which you have spent (as Mahr ) and let them (the disbelievers) ask back for that which they have spent. That is the Judgement of Allâh, He judges between you. And Allâh is All-Knowing, All-Wise. Sura Al-Mumtahina (60:10)
- What is the matter with you? How judge you? Sura Al-Qalam (68:36)
- Or have you oaths from Us, reaching to the Day of Resurrection, that yours will be what you judge? Sura Al-Qalam (68:39)
- So wait with patience for the Decision of your Lord, and be not like the Companion of the Fish - when he cried out (to Us) while he was in deep sorrow. (See the Qur’ân, Verse 21:87). Sura Al-Qalam(68:48)
- Therefore, be patient (O Muhammad) with constancy to the Command of your Lord (Allâh, by doing your duty to Him and by conveying His Message to mankind), and obey neither a sinner nor a disbeliever among them. Sura Al-Insan:24 (76:24)
- Is not Allâh the Best of judges? Sura Al-Alaq (95:8)

=== Afterlife and Justice ===
God's justice determines ones afterlife:

One's condition in the afterlife, felicitous or painful, is determined by the degree to which one has affirmed the unity and justice of God and, because of that affirmation, has acted with justice and mercy toward one's fellows.

"The Qurʿān makes it clear that justice decrees that those who are in the fire will remain there eternally; later commentary has softened that reality by interpreting it to mean that they will remain only as long as the fire itself lasts, and that God in his mercy will at last bring all souls back into his presence in paradise".

== Hypocrisy ==
Munafiq in Islam, or nifaq for hypocrite

- Use of the term in the Quran refers to a specific group headed by Abd Allah ibn Ubaly, whose lack of commitment to Islam caused Muhammad and the early Muslim community great strain at the Battle of Uhud and the Battle of the Trench
- Describes those of weak faith or those who work against Islam
- Those guilty of hypocrisy against Islam are condemned to the fires of hell for their failure to fully support the Muslim cause financially, bodily, and morally

Relevant Quotations in the Quran

- Those (hypocrites) who wait and watch about you; if you gain a victory from Allâh, they say: "Were we not with you?" But if the disbelievers gain a success, they say (to them): "Did we not gain mastery over you and did we not protect you from the believers?" Allâh will judge between you (all) on the Day of Resurrection. And never will Allâh grant to the disbelievers a way (to triumph) over the believers. Sura An-Nisa:141 (4:141)
- Have you not seen those (hypocrites) who claim that they believe in that which has been sent down to you, and that which was sent down before you, and they wish to go for judgement (in their disputes) to the Tâghût [1] (false judges) while they have been ordered to reject them. But Shaitân (Satan) wishes to lead them far astray. Sura An-Nisa:60 (4:60)
- And when it is said to them: "Come to what Allâh has sent down and to the Messenger (Muhammad )," you (Muhammad) see the hypocrites turn away from you (Muhammad ) with aversion. Sura An-Nisa:61 (4:61)
- The building which they built will never cease to be a cause of hypocrisy and doubt in their hearts unless their hearts are cut to pieces. (i.e. till they die). And Allâh is All-Knowing, All-Wise. Sura At-Tawba:110 (9:110)

== Justice regarding non-Muslims ==
In practice, Islamic law offers differing interpretations of Qur’anic justice, but this is done largely by ensuring there is a separation between legal and divine justice. This essentially means the notion of justice regarding non-Muslims is one of how non-Muslims will be punished or rewarded in the afterlife. In common Muslim understanding, it is certain that disbelievers, including atheists and polytheists, will go to jahannam. This is seen as just, as Allah does not accept polytheism or anyone to be associated with Him. However, there are disagreements regarding how justice will work for the People of the Book as they also follow strict monotheism but do not regard Muhammad as a prophet.

It has been proposed by some scholars that Christians, Jews and other monotheistic religions will be allowed to enter jannah. They consider this as justice as it draws upon one of the main pillars of Islam, namely that everyone is judged by their intentions and their deeds. These scholars have made use of varying verses in the Qur’an to support their point. These verses appear to state that as long as there is a belief in God, the Day of Judgment and that they remain righteous, justice shall be done and these people shall find their reward in jannah. As a further basis for their arguments, other verses are drawn upon, such as ‘let there be no compulsion in religion’. Another Qur’anic interpretation that supports this claim is seen when Glassé argues that “in theory, Islam accepts Christianity as a divinely revealed religion”. This is based on verses in the Qur’an which state that the Believers are not solely Muslims, and that these people will be justly rewarded for their prayers and way of life with a place in jannah.

Alternatively, the Qur’an also offers many verses which seem to demonstrate that the only form of justice for all non-Muslims is one where they are all condemned to jahannam due to their failure to follow Muhammad as a prophet of God. However, this interpretation is partially based on verses of the Qur’an which state that Islam is the one true religion. Other scholars and Qur’anic translations have taken Islam in its literal meaning: submission to God. This would be in conjunction with other interpretations of aforementioned Qur’anic verses that promulgate the view that divine justice regarding non-Muslims is based on their deeds and intentions if they still practice monotheism. Conversely, the Qur’an also contains verses in which it is stated that People of the Book are unworthy of Allah's mercy and they shall be justly condemned to hell. This is seen when the Qur’an states “those who conceal God’s revelations in the Book, and purchase for them a miserable profit - they swallow into themselves naught but Fire”. Christians and Jews are seen as having changed the Message that was originally sent to them by Muhammad, which some commentators have interpreted as hypocrisy and linking hands with polytheists and atheists. However, in the same verse, the Qur’an also proposes to “forgive them, and overlook their misdeeds: for God loveth those who are kind.”

=== Reconciliation of double message ===
The Qur’an contains a double message with regard to justice for non-Muslims; it appears to both proclaim that the divine justice in the afterlife for People of the Book will be their place in jannah (presuming they have lived righteously), whilst simultaneously stating that these very people deserve a place in jahannam for their beliefs, no matter how righteous they may live. The Qur’an also contains verses that command Muslims to fight against non-Muslims, whilst concurrently declaring that people who practice monotheism and live righteously will have nothing to fear in the afterlife as divine justice shall reward them with a place in jannah.

There have been attempts to reconcile this by some commentators, who have explained that these contrasts are due to chronology and that verses which were later revealed to Muhammad supersede earlier verses. Alternatively, it is suggested that in Allah’s infinite justice and mercy, He will judge justly according to each individual's intentions and deeds. This line of reasoning follows the idea that we are incapable of fathoming what this decision will be as we are imperfect as humans and cannot attain Allah's perfection.

== See also ==
- Islamic ethics
- Allah
- Qur'an
- Jahannam
- Jannah
- Muhammad
- People of the Book
