= Peace in Islamic philosophy =

The Arabic word salaam (Arabic: سلام "peace") originates from the same root as the word Islam. The word silm (سِلم) also means the religion of Islam in Arabic, and the phrase "he entered as-silm (peace)" means "he entered Islam". One Islamic interpretation is that individual personal peace is attained by submitting one's will to the will of Allah.

The ideal society according to the Quran is Dar as-Salam, literally; "the house of peace" of which it intones: "And Allah invites to the 'abode of peace' and guides whom He pleases into the right path."

According to Ibn Hajar al-Haythami, there will be an era in which justice, plenty, abundance, well-being, security, peace, and brotherhood will prevail among humanity, and one in which people will experience love, self-sacrifice, tolerance, compassion, mercy, and loyalty. Muhammad is reported to have said that this blessed period will be experienced through the mediation of the Mahdi, who will come in the end times to save the world from chaos, injustice, and moral collapse. He will eradicate godless ideologies and bring an end to the prevailing injustice. Moreover, he will make religion like it was in the days of Muhammad, cause the Quran's moral teachings to prevail among humanity, and establish peace and well-being throughout the world.

== See also ==
- Al-Baqara 256
- Pacifism in Islam
- Taqwa
- Glossary of Islam
- Outline of Islam
- Index of Islam-related articles
