= Religious exclusivism =

Stance that only one spiritual belief is true

Religious exclusivism, or religious exclusivity, is the doctrine or belief that only one particular religion or belief system is true. This is in contrast to religious pluralism.

== Buddhism ==
Some attempts have been made to portray Buddhism in an exclusivistic framework by pointing out the implication that those who do not accept the teachings of the Buddha, such as the Noble Eightfold Path, are destined to repeat the cycle of suffering through endless reincarnations; while those who practice the true way can reach enlightenment. Neo-Buddhist groups sometimes consider their tradition the true path to enlightenment and engage in strong evangelical efforts to influence those they consider to be in darkness.

However, many followers of Eastern religions are not exclusivist. For example, there are millions of Buddhists who would also consider themselves to follow Confucianism or Taoism.

Perry Schmidt-Leukel pointed out that the parable about the blind, which tries to describe the elephant in Mevlana Celaleddin-i Rûmi's Mesnevi, but whose original origin is in the Buddhist Pali Canon, is more related to religious exclusivity rather than pluralism in the Buddhist context. In the Buddhist context, the elephant refers to true dharma, the blind refers to those who have views opposing Buddha, the sighted person refers to the king who was Buddha in his previous life, and the clear statement of the text is that blind people cannot enter the path of true salvation, and this is stated in the text as blind people "cannot go beyond Samsara". Only Buddhas show the path to salvation and they will provide the means to cross the Samsara river. The parable ends with a very clear analogy: The light of other teachers is like the light of a firefly, whereas the Buddha's light shines like the sun: "When that illuminator appears, the light of the firefly goes out and shines no more."

== Christianity ==
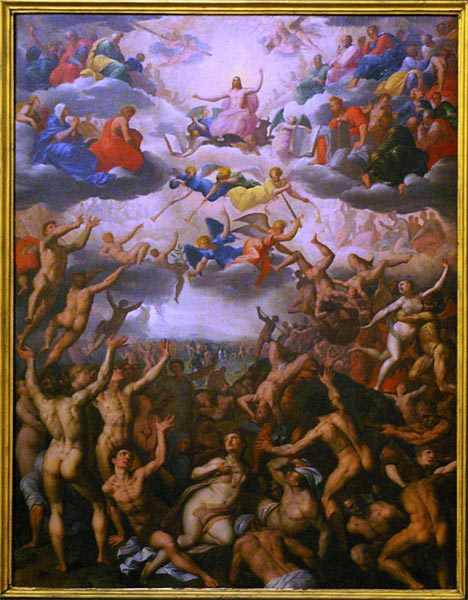
Last Judgment, a painting by Jacob de Backer, c. 1580: Believers ascend into Heaven while sinners and those who reject the faith are doomed to Hell.

Some Christians have argued that religious pluralism is an invalid or self-contradictory concept. Maximal forms of religious pluralism claim that all religions are equally true, or that one religion can be true for some and another for others. Most Christians hold this idea to be logically inconsistent with their beliefs. The two largest Christian branches, the Catholic Church and the Eastern Orthodox Church, both claim to be the "one true church" and that "outside the true Church there is no salvation"; Protestantism, however, which has many different denominations, has no consistent doctrine in this regard, and has a variety of different positions regarding religious pluralism.

A number of Christian denominations assert that they alone represent the one true church – the church to which Jesus gave his authority in the Great Commission. The Catholic Church, the Eastern Orthodox Church, the Oriental Orthodox communion and the Assyrian Church of the East each understands itself as the one and only original church. The claim to the title of the "one true church" relates to the first of the Four Marks of the Church mentioned in the Nicene Creed: "one, holy, catholic, and apostolic church". The concept of schism somewhat moderates the competing claims between some churches – one can potentially repair schism. For example, the Catholic and Eastern Orthodox Churches each regard the other as schismatic rather than heretical.

Many mainstream Protestants regard all baptized Christians as members of a "spiritual Christian Church", which is not visible or institutional; this belief is sometimes referred to by the theological term "invisible church". Some other Christians, such as Anglicans of Anglo-Catholic churchmanship, espouse a version of branch theory which teaches that the true Christian Church comprises Anglican, Eastern Orthodox, Old Catholic, Oriental Orthodox, Scandinavian Lutheran, and Roman Catholic branches.

== Islam ==
Muslims believe that Allah revealed the Qur'an to Muhammad. Other Islamic books considered to be revealed by God before the Quran, mentioned by name in the Quran are the Tawrat (Torah, Hebrew: תּוֹרָה) revealed to the prophets and messengers amongst the Children of Israel, the Zabur (Psalms) revealed to Dawud (David) and the Injil (the Gospel) revealed to Isa (Jesus). The Quran also mentions God having revealed the Scrolls of Abraham and the Scrolls of Moses. Most Muslims, however, maintain that previous messages and revelations have been partially changed or corrupted over time and consider the Quran to be the unaltered and the final revelation from Allah. Religious concepts and practices include the five pillars of Islam, which are basic concepts and obligatory acts of worship, and following Islamic law, which touches on virtually every aspect of life and society, encompassing everything from banking and welfare, to warfare and the environment.

In practice, however, neither the inclusion of Jews and Christians nor militant exclusivism toward "pagans" was always practiced. Trinitarian Christians were accused of idolatry because of their veneration of icons and were also sometimes treated as polytheists because of the doctrines of the Trinity and the Incarnation. Islam sees sincere Jews, Christians, and Sabians as people "of the Book".

Scholars of major Islamic sects have commented that the sect that achieved salvation in this hadith is the sect to which they belong. For example, Abū l-Ḥusayn al-Malaṭī, ‘Abd al-Qāhir Sunni scholars such as al-Baghdādī, Abū l-Muzaffar al-Isfarā'inī, al-Shahrastānī, Sunnis were the saved sect, according to an Ismā'īlī scholar such as Abū Tammām al-Khawārizmī, Ismailis, according to important Mu'tazili scholar Qāḍī 'Abd al-Jabbār the sect that achieved salvation was the Mu'tazilites.

== Judaism ==
Most Jews believe that the God of Abraham is the one true God. The Jews believe the God of Abraham entered into a covenant with the ancient Israelites, marking them as his Chosen People, giving them a mission to spread the concept of monotheism. Jews do not consider their chosenness to be a mark of superiority to other nations, but a responsibility to be an example of behavior for other nations to emulate.

== See also ==
- One true church
- Extra Ecclesiam nulla salus
- Spanish Inquisition
- Mleccha
- Moral absolutism
- Dalit
- 73 Sects (Hadith)
- Sectarian violence
- Supremacism#Religious
- Religious discrimination
- Religious intolerance
- Theocracy
