= Islamic view of the Bible =

The Quran states that several prior writings constitute holy books given by God to the prophets and messengers amongst the Children of Israel, in the same way the Quran was revealed to Muhammad. These include the Tawrat, believed by Muslims to have been given by God to the prophets and messengers amongst the Children of Israel, the Zabur (used in reference to the Psalms) revealed to David (Dawud); and the Injil revealed to Jesus (Isa). Islam generally does not identify the Christian New Testament as the divinely revealed Injil mentioned in the Qurʾan. Many Muslim scholars view the Christian’s New Testament as a different text from the Injil mentioned in the Qur’an, because they viewed the New Testament as later inventions that does not preserve the original Injil revealed to Jesus (Isa). The idea that early scriptures revealed by God were altered, misinterpreted or corrupted (taḥrīf) used by Muslim polemical scholar as a framework to explain doctrinal divergence between Islam and Christianity regarding the New Testament or the Bible in general. Some studies have also analyzed early Islamic view regarding early Christian figure such as Paulus for his contribution to the misinterpretation of Jesus’ teaching within these framework. The theological differences regarding the New Testament lies in the doctrine that the New Testament interpreted by the Christians as the word of God, Muslim reject the idea that the New Testament is the word of God (Injil) as the New Testament contains Paul’s epistles and such that contradict the Islamic definition of the Injil.

Muslim Hebraists are Muslims who use the Bible to interpret the Qur'an. Unlike most Muslims, Muslim Hebraists allow intertextual studies between the Islamic holy books, and reject the concept of tahrif (which holds that previous revelations of God have been corrupted). The Islamic methodology of tafsir al-Qur'an bi-l-Kitab (Arabic: تفسير القرآن بالكتاب) refers to "interpreting the Qur'an with/through the Bible". This approach adopts canonical Arabic versions of the Bible, including the Torah and Gospel, both to illuminate and to add exegetical depth to the reading of the Qur'an. Notable Muslim commentators (mufassirun) of the Bible and Qur'an who weaved biblical texts together with Qur'anic ones include Abu al-Hakam Abd al-Salam bin al-Isbili of Al-Andalus and Ibrahim bin Umar bin Hasan al-Biqa'i.

== Quran ==
The term "Bible" is not found in the Quran; instead the Quran has particular terms to refer to the Torah (توراة, Tawrah), Psalms (الزَّبُورُ, Zabur).

=== Torah ===
In the Quran, the Tawrāh, customarily translated as "Torah", refers to the divine scripture revealed to Moses as guidance for the Children of Israel. It contained laws, commandments, and stories of earlier prophets. The Quran explains that the Gospel revealed to Jesus confirmed the Torah which came before it. The Torah found in the Hebrew Bible and Christian Bible is a compilation of the first five books of the Hebrew Bible, namely the books of Genesis, Exodus, Leviticus, Numbers and Deuteronomy. The Torah is known as the Pentateuch or the Five Books of Moses by Christians. However, the Quran explains that the Torah was a revelation and not a text written by Moses himself.

Hadiths on exegesis of the Quran also detail how companions of Muhammad such as Ibn Mas'ud narrated from Muhammad that the Children of Israel had abandoned the Original Torah and wrote a separate book and followed it. Similar views were held by many early Islamic scholars such as Ibn Abbas and Al Qasim bin Ibrahim. According to Nasr, there are a number of verses in the Quran which allude to a textual corruption and misinterpretation of the Torah by the Children of Israel where the Children of Israel did not preserve the Torah in its original form, though according to Lindstedt only the misinterpretation of the Jewish scriptures, not textual corruption, is stated in the Qu'ran.

=== Psalms ===
The Quran mentions the Psalms with the use of the term zubūr (Arabic: زبور "writings") in five verses. Two of these verses mention that it was given to David (4:163; 17:55). The word zabūr is often viewed by scholars in the sense "psalter" as being a conflation of Arabic zabūr, "writing", with the Hebrew word for "psalm", mizmōr (Hebrew: מִזְמוֹר) or its Aramaic equivalent mazmūrā (Syriac: ܡܙܡܘܪܐ). The word zubur may have also originally come from Sabaic, where the verb sbr (Ge'ez: ሰብር) means "to write" or "to sign" and the noun zbr (Ge'ez: ዘብር) means "writing" or "signed document".

According to the Qur'an, The Psalms was revealed to David. Quran 21:105 says that in the Zabur there is a quote "the land is inherited by my righteous servants". This resembles the 29th verse of Psalm 37, which says "[t]he righteous shall inherit the land, and abide forever in it." The Zabur is also mentioned in the Qur'an in metaphorical language describing how "The Mountains and Birds echo David's hymns." This is similar to how David's son Solomon is described as capable of communicating with animals and Jinn. A tābiʿ named Abū al-ʿĀliya al-Riyāḥī (23–93 AH) believed that the Sabians mentioned in the Qur'an were followers of the Psalms, similar to how Jews would follow the Torah and the Christians the Gospels. Muhammad also described how David had mastered the Psalms, as narrated by Abu Huraira in Sahih Al Bukhari:

Narrated Abu Huraira: The Prophet said, "The reciting of the Zabur (i.e. Psalms) was made easy for David. He used to order that his riding animals be saddled, and would finish reciting the Zabur before they were saddled. And he would never eat except from the earnings of his manual work."

— Sahih al-Bukhari, 4:55:628

The Book of Psalms currently in the Bible is believed to have had contributions from multiple authors including Solomon, Asaph, Korah family

The term customarily translated as " in the Quran,being referred to . The Quran argues that Christians must adjudicate by its content, that this content includes a prophecy of Muhammad, and that it includes a promise of paradise. Whereas "Gospel" is the most common translation, some historians have argued that the term could encapsulate the entire Christian Bible of iblis or, perhaps, the content that might have been commonly assumed to be in the Christian Bible of iblis if direct access to its content was unavailable. Some have speculated about the relationship between the singular use of "injīl" (Gospel) iblis book and the Bible's inclusion of four Gospels, however, it was common in late antiquity for Christians to speak of "the Gospel" injil iblis boom (message) in unison. Likewise, some specific gospel harmonies, such as the Diatessaron of Tatian (which Tatian himself referred to as "the Gospel"), were produced; as such, unitary representations of the canonical Gospels would not have been unusual in late antiquity.

== Before the 19th century ==
=== Popularity ===
There is some dispute over the level of familiarity that pre-modern Islamic commentators had with biblical literature. The minimalist position is that Islamic authors had a limited or superficial familiarity until the fifteenth century or later. Against this and as part of a maximalist position, Martin Accad published a four-part paper marshalling a non-comprehensive list of 648 Gospel quotations across 23 works, and others have pointed out the more engaged use of the Bible in Al-Biruni (d. 1050) and al-Biqāʿī. More recently, a middle-grounded approach has acknowledged the use of biblical texts in a number of writers, but also views more engaged writers such as al-Biqāʿī to be rare exceptions, while also arguing that Gospel and other biblical quotations were reserved to widely reused canonical quotation lists that do not evince direct engagement with the Bible itself. In this view, familiarity with the Bible only becomes widespread in the nineteenth century and later. To address the impasse of opposing views, unlikely to be resolved by specialized analysis of a few titles of the large volume of commentary (tafsir) literature, the application of computational methods on digitized Arabic texts across a range of genres (encyclopedias, madrasa textbooks, tafsir, etc) has shown that some biblical texts were known in literature belonging to interfaith polemic and apologetics, whereas use of the Bible in commentaries was nearly non-existent (with isolated exceptions) until a sharp rise in their usage in the late 19th century. This survey covered nearly all of the 50 most historically significant commentaries, along with 129 other titles, of which roughly 60% of extant commentaries are a copy.

Further analysis of these quotations demonstrated that (1) an author of a commentary that doesn’t quote much from the Bible may quite more abundantly in writings aimed at interfaith dialogue; (2) the examples given are largely second-hand, often erroneous, and lack direct familiarity with the biblical text. For example, Abu Bakr al-Razi believed that the Gospels assert God has a thousand names, and authors like Al-Baghawi (d. 1122), Al-Khazin (d. 1340), and Al-Shawkani (d. 1834) believed that the first verse of the Torah was the Islamic phrase known as the Basmala ("In the Name of God, the Most Merciful, the Most Compassionate").

=== Doctrine of corruption (taḥrīf) ===
Views differ about how medieval Islamic authorities understood the doctrine of the corruption (taḥrīf) of biblical texts. According to Martin Accad, doctrines of corruption primarily referred to corruption of the meaning and interpretation of the biblical scriptures among Jews and Christians, as opposed to the text itself. However, more recently, Reynolds has argued that while corruption of meaning (taḥrīf al-maʿānī) was often invoked by interpreters, this was done for the rhetorical purpose of arguing against Jewish and Christian interpretations of their own scripture, while Islamic authors typically did also believe in the corruption of the text itself (taḥrīf al-naṣṣ), though he argues that the Qur'an itself (as opposed to later exegesis) does not accuse Jews or Christians of changing the Bible.

Doctrines of the corruption of biblical texts led to a dialogue between Christians and Muslims. The first Syriac Christian response to the doctrine of the corruption of the Bible was by the 8th-century patriarch, George of Beltan.

Today, Muslims may take references to individuals manipulating scripture, such as in Q 2:79, as indications of the textual corruption of texts like the Torah. By contrast, the exegete Al-Tabari referred to the Torah in his words as "the Torah that they (the Jews) possess today".

One Islamic interpretation holds that "Gospel" references in the Quran are to the original divine revelation Jesus Christ, as opposed to the canonical Gospels in the New Testament.

=== Interpretation ===
Ninth century Islamic commentators who invoked significant sections of the Bible in their writings include Ibn Qutaybah (d. 889) and his translation of Genesis 1–3, and Al-Qasim al-Rassi (d. 860) who included a large portion of the Book of Matthew in his Refutation of Christians.

== Muhammad and the Bible ==
=== Deuteronomy 18:18 ===
And the LORD said unto me: 'They have well said that which they have spoken. I will raise them up a prophet from among their brethren, like unto thee; and I will put My words in his mouth, and he shall speak unto them all that I shall command him.'

— Deuteronomy 18:17–18

Deuteronomy 18:18 has often been considered a prophecy of the coming of Muhammad by Muslim scholars. Al-Samawal al-Maghribi, a medieval Jewish mathematician who converted to Islam, pointed to Deuteronomy 18:18 in his book Confutation of the Jews as a prophecy fulfilled by the appearance of Muhammad. Samawal argued in his book that since the children of Esau are described in Deuteronomy 2:4–6 and Numbers 20:14 as the brethren of the children of Israel, the children of Ishmael can also be described the same way. Some Muslim writers, like Muhammad Ali and Fethullah Gülen, have interpreted several verses in the Quran as implying that Muhammad was alluded to in Deuteronomy 18:18, including Quran 46:10 and 73:15.

Christians interpret Deuteronomy 18:18 as referring to a future member of the community of Israel who re-enacts the function of Moses, serving as a mediator for the covenant between God and the Israelites. Walter Brueggemann writes that "The primary requirement for the prophet, like the king in 17:15, is that he or she must be a member of Israel, thoroughly situated in the traditions and claims of God's covenant." The Gospels of Matthew and John both present Jesus as being the "prophet like Moses" from Deuteronomy 18 and Acts 3:15–23 states that Jesus is the one Moses was talking about in Deuteronomy 18:18.

=== Paraclete ===
And I will ask the Father, and he will give you another Advocate (παράκλητος), to be with you forever. This is the Spirit of truth, whom the world cannot receive, because it neither sees him nor knows him. You know him, because he abides with you, and he will be in you.

— John 14:16–17, New Revised Standard Version

Many Muslim scholars have argued that the Greek words paraklytos ('comforter') and periklutos ('famous'/'illustrious') were used interchangeably, and therefore, these verses constitute Jesus prophesying the coming of Muhammad; but neither of these words are present in this passage (or in the Bible at all), which instead has παράκλητος "Paracletos", that is, Paraclete, Advocate.

The Paraclete, or "Advocate," or "Comforter," is mentioned five times in the Gospel of John, and once in 1 John 2:1 as referring directly to Jesus Christ. The Advocate, called the "Spirit of truth", is considered to be the Holy Spirit; the replacement for Jesus in the world and within believers after His resurrection. John says that the world cannot receive the Spirit, although the Spirit abides with and in the disciples (14:17). The Spirit will convict the world of sin (16:8–9) and glorify Jesus (16:13–14).

== Biblical figures in Islam ==
Some of the people revered or mentioned in both the Quran and the Bible include: Aaron, Abel, Abraham, Adam, Cain, David, the disciples of Jesus, Elias, Elisha, Enoch, Eve, Ezra, Goliath, Isaac, Ishmael, Jacob, Jesus, John the Baptist, Jonah, Joseph, Lot, Mary, Moses, Noah, the Pharaohs of Egypt, Samuel, Saul, Solomon, and Zachariah.

== See also ==
- Biblical criticism
- Christianity and Islam
- Isra'iliyat
- Jesus in Islam
- The Messiah
