= List of Islamic texts =

This is a list of Islamic texts. The religious texts of Islam include the Quran (the central text), several previous texts (considered by Muslims to be previous revelations from Allah), including the Tawrat (Torah) revealed to the prophets and messengers amongst the Children of Israel, the Zabur (Psalms) revealed to Dawud (David) and the Injil (the Gospel) revealed to Isa (Jesus), and the hadith (deeds and sayings attributed to Muhammad, which comprise the sunnah).

The Islamic holy books are a number of religious scriptures that are regarded by Muslims as having valid divine significance, in that they were authored by God (Allah) through a variety of prophets and messengers, all of which predate the Quran. Among scriptures considered to be valid revelations, three that are named in the Quran are: the Tawrat (Arabic for Torah), received by prophets and messengers amongst the Israelites; the Zabur (Psalms), received by David; and the Injīl (Arabic for the Gospel), received by Jesus. Additionally, the Quran mentions the Scrolls of Abraham and the Scrolls of Moses, as well as individual revelations and guidance to specific Messengers.

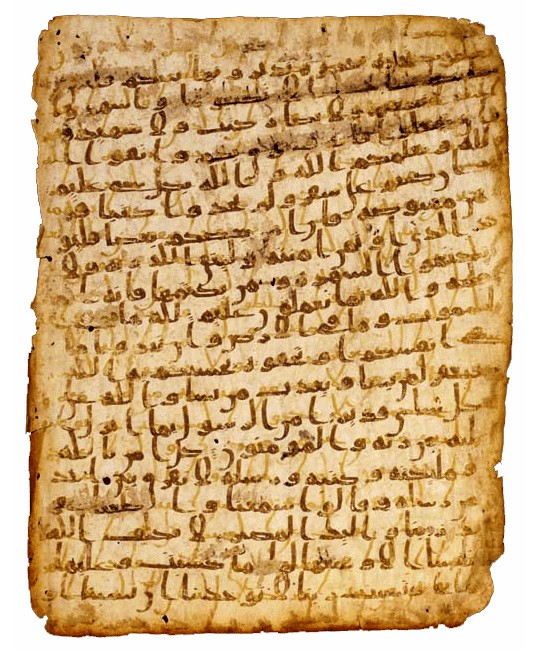
Early Quranic manuscript written on vellum (mid-late 7th century CE)

Muslims hold the Quran, as it was revealed to Muhammad, to be God's final revelation to mankind, and therefore a completion and confirmation of previous scriptures, such as the Bible. Despite the primacy that Muslims place upon the Quran in this context, belief in the validity of earlier Abrahamic scriptures is one of the six Islamic articles of faith. However, for most self-identified Muslims, the level of this belief is restricted by the concept of tahrif.

The Islamic methodology of tafsir al-Qur'an bi-l-Kitab (Arabic: تفسير القرآن بالكتاب) refers to interpreting the Quran with/through the Bible. This approach adopts canonical Arabic versions of the Bible, including the Tawrat and the Injil, both to illuminate and to add exegetical depth to the reading of the Quran. Notable Muslim mufassirun (commentators) of the Bible and Quran who weaved biblical texts together with Quranic ones include Abu al-Hakam Abd al-Salam bin al-Isbili of al-Andalus, Ibrahim bin Umar bin Hasan al-Biqa'i, Hamid al-Din al-Kirmani, and the Brethren of Purity.

== Quran ==
The Quran is the central religious text of Islam, which Muslims believe to be a revelation from God. It is widely regarded as the finest work in classical Arabic literature. The Quran comprises 114 chapters of varying lengths, known as surahs, each formed from several verses, known as ayah.

Muslims believe the Quran was verbally revealed by Allah to Muhammad through the angel Jibril (Gabriel), gradually over a period of approximately 23 years, starting in late 609, when Muhammad was 39, and concluding in 632, the year of his death. Muslims regard the Quran as the most important miracle of Muhammad, a proof of his prophethood, and the culmination of a series of divine messages that started with the messages revealed to Adam and ended with Muhammad. It is widely regarded as the finest work in classical Arabic literature.

=== Tafsīr ===
A tafsir is an exegesis or commentary on the Quran. It attempts to provide education, explanation, interpretation, context or commentary for clear understanding and conviction of God's will in Islam. The idea of the interpretation of the Quran first appears in the Quran itself, commenting on cases where it is clear and others where it is ambiguous.

Principally, a tafsir deals with the issues of linguistics, jurisprudence, and theology. In terms of perspective and approach, tafsir can be broadly divided into two main categories, namely tafsir bi-al-ma'thur (lit. received tafsir), which is transmitted from the early days of Islam through the Islamic prophet Muhammad and his companions, and tafsir bi-al-ra'y (lit. tafsir by opinion), which is arrived through personal reflection or independent rational thinking.

Reasons of revelation (asbāb al-nuzūl)

The science which describes the reason, circumstances, and events surrounding the revelation of verses.

== Previous revelations ==
Other Islamic books considered to be revealed by God before the Quran, mentioned by name in the Quran are the Tawrat (Torah) revealed to the prophets and messengers amongst the Children of Israel, the Zabur (Psalms) revealed to Dawud (David) and the Injil (the Gospel) revealed to Isa (Jesus). The Quran also mentions God having revealed the Scrolls of Abraham and the Scrolls of Moses.

The Islamic methodology of tafsir al-Qur'an bi-l-Kitab (Arabic: تفسير القرآن بالكتاب) refers to interpreting the Qur'an with/through the Bible. This approach adopts canonical Arabic versions of the Bible, including the Tawrat and the Injil, both to illuminate and to add exegetical depth to the reading of the Qur'an. Notable Muslim mufassirun (commentators) of the Bible and Qur'an who weaved biblical texts together with Qur'anic ones include Abu al-Hakam Abd al-Salam bin al-Isbili of Al-Andalus and Ibrahim bin Umar bin Hasan al-Biqa'i.

=== Tawrat (Torah) ===
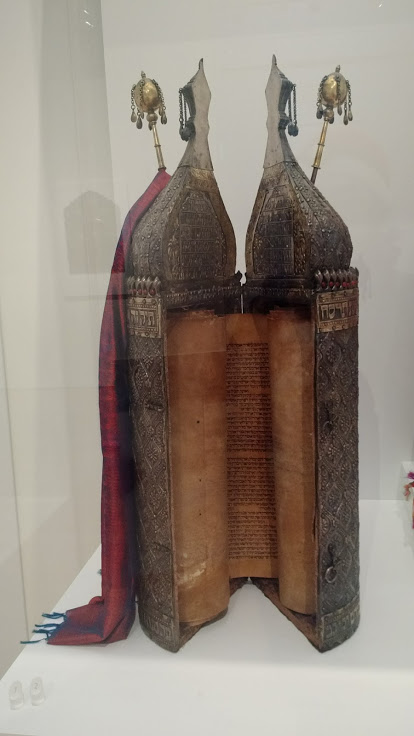
Open Torah case with scroll

The Tawrat (also Tawrah or Taurat; Arabic: توراة) is the Arabic name for the Torah within its context as an Islamic holy book believed by Muslims to have been given by God to the prophets and messengers amongst the Children of Israel. When referring to traditions from the Tawrat, Muslims have not only identified it with the Pentateuch, but also with the other books of the Hebrew Bible as well as with Talmudic and Midrashim writings.

=== Zabur (Psalms) ===
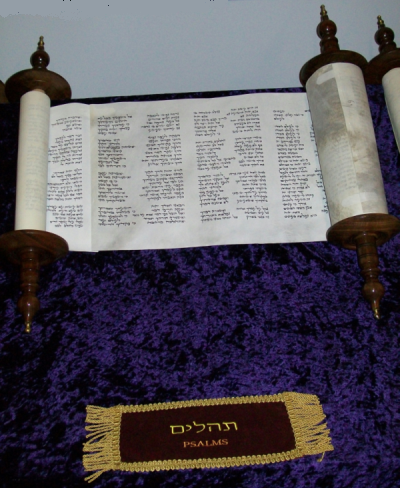
Scroll of the Psalms

The Quran mentions the Zabur, interpreted as being the Book of Psalms, as being the holy scripture revealed to Dawud (King David). Scholars have often understood the Psalms to have been holy songs of praise, and not a book administering law. The current Psalms are still praised by many Muslim scholars. Quran 21:105 and Psalm 37:29 are direct counterparts.

=== Injil (Gospel) ===
The Injil was the holy book revealed to Isa (Jesus), according to the Quran. Most scholars and Muslims believe that it refers not to the New Testament but to an original Gospel given to Jesus as the word of Allah.

=== Scrolls of Abraham ===
The Scrolls of Abraham (Arabic: صحف إبراهيم, Ṣuḥuf ʾIbrāhīm) (Note: Alternatives: Arabic: صُحُفِ إِبْرَاهِيم Ṣuḥufi ʾIbrāhīm and/or الصُّحُفِ ٱلْأُولَىٰ Aṣ-Ṣuḥufi 'l-Ūlā - "Books of the Earliest Revelation".) are believed to have been one of the earliest bodies of scripture, which were given to Abraham (Ibrāhīm). Although usually referred to as "scrolls", many translators have translated the Arabic suhuf as "books". The verse mentioning the "Scriptures" is in Quran 87:18-19 where they are referred to, alongside the Scrolls of Moses, to have been "Books of Earlier Revelation".

=== Scrolls of Moses ===
The Scrolls of Moses (Arabic: صُحُفِ مُوسَىٰ, Ṣuḥuf Mūsā) are an ancient body of scripture mentioned twice in the Quran. They are part of the religious scriptures of Islam. Jordanian scholar and professor of philosophy Ghazi bin Muhammad mentions that the "Scrolls of Moses" are identical to the Torah of Moses. Others have stated that they could possibly refer to the Book of the Wars of the Lord, a lost text spoken of in the Old Testament or Tanakh in the Book of Numbers. The verse mentioning the "Scriptures" is in Quran 87:18-19 where they are referred to, alongside the Scrolls of Abraham, to have been "Books of Earlier Revelation".

== Hadith ==
The hadith collections, compiled by traditionists, are the purported words, actions, or the silent approvals of the prophet Muhammad or his immediate circle (his companions in Sunni Islam, his family in Shia Islam).

=== Sunni collections ===
There are nine major Sunni Hadith collections, with the first six usually grouped together as the Six Books:

- Sahih al-Bukhari
- Sahih Muslim
- Sunan Abi Dawud
- Sunan al-Tirmidhi
- Sunan al-Nasa'i
- Sunan ibn Majah
- Muwatta Imam Malik
- Sunan al-Darimi
- Musnad Ahmad ibn Hanbal

=== Shia collections ===
There are four major Shia Hadith collections:

- Kitab al-Kafi
- Man La Yahduruhu al-Faqih
- Tahdhib al-Ahkam
- Al-Istibsar

=== Hadith commentaries ===
Hadith commentaries or Sharh are texts that examines the meaning, historical context, and legal implications the hadiths (sayings, actions, and silent approvals of the Prophet Muhammad), to explore the deeper spiritual and philosophical meanings, such as the intentions behind good deeds. The intention is to enable readers understand and apply the hadiths to their daily lives. The hadiths referred to events and actions in the 7th-century and were later compiled into several collections over the 8th-11th centuries CE. The commentaries explain the historical context of specific hadiths, indicating if it was meant for a specific time and person or had wider implications. This led to the sharh writers extracting Islamic rules (Fiqh) from the Hadiths, often leaning towards one or other of the legal schools (Madhhabs) in their interpretations for subjects such as worship, marriage, and ethics. Some commentators also provided analyses of difficult grammar and vocabulary.

The six most noted commentaries on Sahih al-Bukhari are:

- A'lam al-Sunan by al-Khattabi (d. 998), the earliest commentary on Sahih Bukhari.
- Sharh Ibn Battal by Ibn Battal (d. 1057)
- Al-Kawakib al-Darari by Shams al-Din al-Kirmani (d. 1384).
- Fath al-Bari by Ibn Hajar al-Asqalani (d. 1449)
- Umdat al-Qari by Badr al-Din al-Ayni (d. 1451)
- Irshad al-Sari by Al-Qastallani (d. 1517)

The two most notable commentaries on Sahih Muslim are:

- Fath al-Mulhim (1916) by Shabbir Ahmad Usmani.
- Takmilah Fath al-Mulhim (1994) by Taqi Usmani.

=== Biographical evaluation ===
Biographical evaluation (Arabic: عِلْمُ الرِّجال, romanized: ʿilm ar-rijāl; literally "Knowledge of Men") is a discipline within hadith studies, in which the credibility of hadith narrators is evaluated using both historic and religious knowledge, in order to distinguish authentic and reliable hadiths from unreliable ones.

Important books on biographical evaluation include:

- The Great History (Sunni) by Muhammad al-Bukhari.
- Ikhtiyar ma'rifat al-rijal (Shia) by Shaykh Tusi (995–1067 CE) from the Rijāl al-Kashshī by Muhammad ibn Umar al-Kashshi (c. 854–941/951).

== See also ==
- List of Sunni books
- List of Shia books
- Historiography of early Islam
- Muslim Hebraists
- Biblical and Quranic narratives
- Canonization of Islamic scripture
- Prophets and messengers in Islam
