= Muslim Hebraists =

Field of Islamic studies

Muslim Hebraists (Arabic: المسلمون العبرانييون) are Muslims who use the Bible, generally referred to in quranic studies as the Tawrat and the Injil, to interpret the Qur'an. Unlike mainstream Sunni Muslims, Muslim Hebraists allow intertextual studies between the Islamic holy books, and reject the concept of tahrif (which holds that previous revelations of God have been corrupted).

The Islamic methodology of tafsir al-Qur'an bi-l-Kitab (تفسير القرآن بالكتاب) refers to interpreting the Qur'an with/through the Bible. This approach adopts canonical Arabic versions of the Bible, including the Tawrat and the Injil, both to illuminate and to add exegetical depth to the reading of the Qur'an.

== History ==
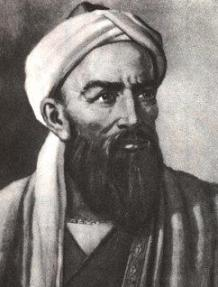
Iranian polymath Al-Biruni, described by historian Walter J. Fischel as the "greatest Muslim Hebraist"

Some Muslim scholars have opposed the concept of tahrif (which holds that previous revelations of God have been corrupted), believing that it is permissible to quote the Torah and the Gospel. These include the 15th-century Muslim Hebraist Ibrahim ibn Umar al-Biqa'i (d. 1480), who did not prohibit the use of the Gospel or the Torah in interpreting the Qur'an. This can be seen in various verses in his tafsir (commentary of the Qur'an) titled Nazm al-Durar fi Tanasub al-Ayat wa-al-Suwar (نـظـم الـدرر في تـنـاسـب الآيـات و الـسـور). For al-Biqa'i, quoting from the Torah, Gospel and other previous revelations of God is an act that is permitted by the Sharia. Al-Biqa'i drew extensively on the Hebrew Bible and the New Testament as sources to elucidate certain Qur'anic verses. Intellectual figures who impacted al-Biqa'i's work included al-Haralli and al-Asbahani. Al-Biqa'i believed that quoting from the previous revelations of God is only permitted in terms of stories and sagas of the past. Aside from this, al-Biqa'i favoured the use of rhetorical and logical coherence as the primary tool for interpretation of the Qur'an.

Al-Biqa'i also defended the use of quoting the Gospels and the Torah due to the consensus of the Muslim community. He said that the tradition of intertextual quoting between the revelations of God or more specifically quoting the Torah and the Gospel, has become commonplace in the Muslim world. He also revealed that the tradition of quoting has become ijma' sukuti (silent agreement). This was evidenced by the number of commentaries that practiced quotation, including Tafsir al-Kashshaf written by al-Zamakhshari, and Tafsir al-Kabir authored by Fakhr al-Din al-Razi. Al-Biqa'i also stated that the Shafi'i mufti of Makkah supported his views and praised his work and was eager to obtain a copy of his Qur'anic commentary.

Other notable Muslim mufassirun (commentators) or philosophers of the Bible and Qur'an who weaved biblical texts together with Qur'anic ones include Abu al-Hakam Abd al-Salam bin al-Isbili of al-Andalus (better known as Ibn Barrajan), Hamid al-Din al-Kirmani, Shams al-Din al-Daylami, and the Brethren of Purity. According to historian Walter J. Fischel, the Iranian polymath Al-Biruni was "the greatest Muslim Hebraist".

== See also ==
- Tahrif
- Intertextuality
