= Tahrif =

Alterations to holy books preceding the Quran

Taḥrīf (Arabic: تحريف, transl. 'distortion') or corruption of the Bible, is a term used by most Muslims to refer to believed alterations made to the previous revelations of God—specifically those that make up the Tawrat or Torah, the Zabur or Psalms, and the Injil or Gospel. The term can also refer to what Muslims consider to be the corrupted Jewish and Christian interpretations of the previous revelations of God, known as "Tahrif al-Mana". This concept holds that earlier revelations have been misinterpreted rather than textually altered.

== Origin ==
The origins of Tahrif are debated. A study of Muslim views of the Bible in the first four centuries observed that positive views of preservation of previous scriptures are prevalent in the Quran itself, even in the few verses expressing a negative view, and among early commentators due to the belief that Muhammad was in the previous scriptures. In the 8th century, Muqatil ibn Sulayman claimed in his tafsir on al-Baqara 2:79 of the Quran that Jews had distorted the Tawrat and removed mention of Muhammad in the Quran in his Tafsir, 2:79. Some academics doubt this as a true mention of tahrif. The 9th century Zaydi scholar al-Qasim al-Rassi claimed that Jews and Christians had misinterpreted the interpretations of the Tawrat, Zabur, and the Injil. This concept is referred to as tahrif al-mana. However, al-Qasim al-Rassi did not believe the Bible to be only misinterpreted, but instead to have an inauthentic transmission.

According to Camilla Adang, the early quranic exegete al-Tabari believed that there was a genuine Tawrat of Moses that had been lost and then restored by Ezra alongside a different Torah created by the rabbis and ignorant Jews. Tabari suspected that the Jews of his time were using this different Tawrat instead of the authentic Mosaic one, which is why Tabari made the distinction of referring to the Torah of his time as "The Torah that they possess today". Tabari says elsewhere in his Tafsir of Quran al-Baqara 2:42 that they had introduced falsehood with their own hands in the Torah.

Some companions of the Prophet, such as Uthman (Ibn Qasir rejects the authenticity of the transmission from him) and ibn Abbas, made some statements that imply he believed the scriptures of "the people of the book" were distorted. (according to Tafsir Ibn Kathir 2:79) In Sahih al-Bukhari, he is quoted saying:

Ibn ʿAbbas said, "Why do you ask the people of the scripture about anything while your Book (Qur'an) which has been revealed to Allah's Messenger (ﷺ) is newer and the latest? You read it pure, undistorted and unchanged, and Allah has told you that the people of the scripture [Jews and Christians] changed their scripture and distorted it, and wrote the scripture with their own hands and said, 'It is from Allah', to sell it for a little gain. Does not the knowledge which has come to you prevent you from asking them about anything? No, by Allah, we have never seen any man from them asking you regarding what has been revealed to you!"

— Sahih Bukhari 7363

The first the corruption of the Biblical text was elaborated more extensively by ibn Hazm in the 11th century, who popularized the concept of tahrif al-nass, 'corruption of the text'. Ibn Hazm rejected claims of Mosaic authorship and posited that Ezra was the author of the Torah. He systematically organised the arguments against the authenticity of the Biblical text in the Hebrew Bible and the New Testament of his book: chronological and geographical inaccuracies and contradictions, theological impossibilities (anthropomorphic expressions, stories of fornication and whoredom, and the attributing of sins to prophets), as well as lack of reliable transmission (tawatur) of the text.

Ibn Hazm explains how the falsification of the Torah could have taken place while only one copy of the Torah existed, kept by the Aaronic priesthood of the Temple in Jerusalem. Ibn Hazm's arguments had a major impact on Muslim literature and scholars, and the themes that he raised concerning tahrif and other polemical ideas were modified slightly by some later authors. The Twelver Shia scholar ibn Babawayh narrated a debate between Ali al-Rida and the catholicos where Ali al-Rida, the 8th Imam of the Twelvers, claimed that the existing Gospels were created and changed after the original Gospel was lost.

The concept of tahrif has also been advocated by Quranists such as Rashad Khalifa, Edip Yuksel, and Ahmed Subhy Mansour, who believed that previous revelations of God, such as the Tawrat and the Bible, contained contradictions due to human interference. They believed that the beliefs and practices of Islam should be based on the Qur'an alone.

== Types ==
Amin Ahsan Islahi writes about four types of tahrif:

1. To deliberately interpret something in a manner that is opposite to the author's intention. To distort the pronunciation of a word to such an extent that the word changes completely.
2. To add to or delete a sentence or discourse in a manner that distorts the original meaning. For example, according to Muslim tradition, Jews altered the incident of the migration of Abraham so that no one could prove that Abraham had any relationship with the Kaaba.
3. To translate a word that has two meanings in the meaning that is against the context. For example, the Aramaic word used for Jesus that is equivalent to the Arabic: ابن ibn was translated as "son" whereas it also meant "servant" and "slave".
4. To raise questions about something clear to create uncertainty or change it completely.

== Scholarly opposition ==
According to Professor Ilka Lindstedt of the University of Helsinki, nowhere is the corruption of the Jewish or Christian scriptures stated in the Qu'ran, but only its misinterpretation. Mehdy Shaddel writes that the Qur'an is 'decidedly non-supercessionist. In none of the proclamations addressed to Jews and Christians in the text does it assert that their belief systems, scriptures, or way of life are misguided or have been abrogated.'; the Quran confirms what the Jews and Christians already possess (Q 2:89), and it confirms the continued relevance of the Torah and Gospel held by Jews and Christians of the time as a binding source of law. Abdullah Saeed writes :

Even if there is textual corruption associated with interpretation, the actual scriptures can still be relied upon and considered "Books of God." For the Qur'än, the concept of the "Book of God" was appropriately used to the scriptures of Jews and Christians even though these may not be from the Muslim point of view "exactly as they were" during the time of Moses or Jesus and are, in some cases, translated from the original languages to other languages or narrated by a person other than the Prophet who received the revelation. Since the "authorized" scriptures of Jews and Christians remain very much today as they existed at the time of the Prophet, it is difficult to argue that the Qur'anic references to Tawrat and Injil were only to the "pure" Tawrat and Injil as existed at the time of Moses and Jesus, respectively. If the texts have remained more or less as they were in the seventh century CE, the reverence the Qur'än has shown them at the time should be retained even today.

Some Muslim scholars have opposed the concept of tahrif, believing that it is permissible to quote the Torah and the Gospel. These include Ibrahim ibn Umar al-Biqa'i (d. 1480), a Muslim Hebraist who did not prohibit the use of the Gospel or the Torah in interpreting the Qur’an. This can be seen in various verses in his tafsir Nazm al-Durar fi Tanasub al-Ayat wa-al-Suwar (Arabic: نـظـم الـدرر في تـنـاسـب الآيـات و الـسـور), where there are many quotations from the Gospel and the Torah used by al-Biqa'i in interpreting the Qur'an. For al-Biqa'i, quoting from the Torah, Gospel and other previous revelations of God is an act that is permitted by the Sharia. Another argument used by al-Biqa'i is a hadith attributed to the prophet Muhammad that allows his people to tell the things obtained from the Children of Israel, "Tell me whatever you learn from me, even if it is a verse, and tell me what you learn from the Children of Israel, for that does not make it a sin." Al-Biqa'i believed that quoting from the previous revelations of God is only permitted in terms of stories and sagas of the past.

Al-Biqa'i also defended the use of quoting the Gospels and the Torah due to the consensus of the Muslim community. He said that the tradition of intertextual quoting between the revelations of God or more specifically quoting the Torah and the Gospel, has become commonplace in the Muslim world. He also revealed that the tradition of quoting has become ijma' sukuti (silent agreement). This was evidenced by the number of commentaries that practiced quotation, including Tafsir al-Kashshaf written by al-Zamakhshari, and Tafsir al-Kabir authored by Fakhr al-Din al-Razi.

Other notable Muslim commentators and philosophers of the Bible and Qur'an who weaved biblical texts together with Qur'anic ones include Abu al-Hakam Abd al-Salam bin al-Isbili of Al-Andalus (better known as Ibn Barrajan), Hamid al-Din al-Kirmani, and the Brethren of Purity.

In the The Syro-Aramaic Reading of the Koran Christoph Luxenberg proposes that the Quran considers itself not to be a substitute for scripture but a lectionary (the word "quran" meaning lectionary) that references external scripture.

== See also ==
- Muslim Hebraists
- Biblical inerrancy
- Categories of New Testament manuscripts
- Criticism of the Quran
- Great and abominable church - Mormon equivalent doctrine
- Islamic holy books
- Internal consistency of the Bible
- Naskh
- Supersessionism
- Textual variants in the New Testament
