= Scrolls of Abraham =

Religious scriptures of Islam

The Scrolls of Abraham (Arabic: صحف إبراهيم, Ṣuḥuf ʾIbrāhīm) (Note: Alternatives: Arabic: صُحُفِ إِبْرَاهِيم Ṣuḥufi ʾIbrāhīm and/or الصُّحُفِ ٱلْأُولَAṣ-Ṣuḥufi 'l-Ūlā - "Books of the Earliest Revelation") are a part of the religious scriptures of Islam. These scriptures are believed to have contained the revelations of Abraham received from the God of Abrahamic religions, which were written down by him as well as his scribes and followers.

== Background ==
Although Suhuf is generally understood to mean 'Scrolls', many translators - including Abdullah Yusuf Ali and Marmaduke Pickthall - have translated the verse as "The Books of Abraham and Moses".

== Qur'anic mention ==
The Quran refers to certain Scrolls of Abraham, which have alternatively been translated as the Books of Abraham. Most Muslim scholars have agreed that no scrolls of Abraham survive today, and therefore this is a reference to a lost body of scripture. However, Jordanian scholar and professor of philosophy Ghazi bin Muhammad mentions that the message of the "Scrolls of Abraham" are self-described in the Qur'an. They include: (1) belief in One God; (2) belief in the Afterlife (and hence in judgement); (3) prayer and remembrance of God; and (4) purification of the soul from the ego and evil (and hence virtue). The Scrolls of Abraham are understood by Muslims to refer to certain revelations Abraham received, which he would have then transmitted to writing.

The 87th chapter of the Quran, surah Al-Ala, concludes saying the subject matter of the surah has been in the earlier scriptures of Abraham and Moses. It is slightly indicative of what were in the previous scriptures, according to Islam:

Therefore give admonition in case the admonition profits (the hearer).
The admonition will be received by those who fear (Allah):
But it will be avoided by those most unfortunate ones,
Who will enter the Great Fire,
In which they will then neither die nor live.
But those will prosper who purify themselves,
And glorify the name of their Guardian-Lord, and (lift their hearts) in prayer.
Nay (behold), ye prefer the life of this world;
But the Hereafter is better and more enduring.
And this is in the Books of the earliest (Revelation),-
The Books of Abraham and Moses.

— Quran 87:9-19

Chapter 53 of the Quran, surah An-Najm mentions some more subject matters of the earlier scriptures of Abraham and Moses.

Nay, is he not acquainted with what is in the Books of Moses-
And of Abraham who fulfilled his engagements?-
Namely, that no bearer of burdens can bear the burden of another;
That man can have nothing but what he strives for;
That (the fruit of) his striving will soon come in sight:
Then will he be rewarded with a reward complete;
That to thy Lord is the final Goal;
That it is He Who granteth Laughter and Tears;
That it is He Who granteth Death and Life;
That He did create in pairs,- male and female,
From a seed when lodged (in its place);
That He hath promised a Second Creation (Raising of the Dead);
That it is He Who giveth wealth and satisfaction;
That He is the Lord of Sirius (the Mighty Star);
And that it is He Who destroyed the (powerful) ancient 'Ad (people),
And the Thamud nor gave them a lease of perpetual life.
And before them, the people of Noah, for that they were (all) most unjust and most insolent transgressors,
And He destroyed the Overthrown Cities (of Sodom and Gomorrah).
So that (ruins unknown) have covered them up.
Then which of the gifts of thy Lord, (O man,) wilt thou dispute about?
This is a Warner, of the (series of) Warners of old!
The (Judgment) ever approaching draws nigh:
No (soul) but Allah can lay it bare.
Do ye then wonder at this recital?
And will ye laugh and not weep,-
Wasting your time in vanities?
But fall ye down in prostration to Allah, and adore (Him)!

— Quran 53:36-62

== Identification ==
According to J. M. Rodwell, the Scrolls of Abraham are mentioned in the Fihrist as the scriptures that the Sabians received. Rodwell suggests that the text mentioned the destruction of 'Ad and Thamud.

Some scholars suggest the Scrolls of Abraham to be a reference to the Sefer Yetzirah, as its appendix (vi. 15) and Jewish tradition generally ascribe the reception of its revelation to Abraham. Other scholars, however, suggest it refers to the Testament of Abraham, which was also available at the time of Muhammad (Muḥammad ibn ʿAbdullāh).

The Quran contains numerous references to Abraham, his life, prayers and traditions and has a dedicated chapter named Ibrahim (14). On a relevant note, surah Al-Kahf (18) was revealed as an answer from God to the Jews who asked Muhammad about past events. Here God directly instructed Muhammad in surah Al-Kahf (18:22), not to consult the Jews for verifying the three stories about which they inquired.

...Enter not, therefore, into controversies concerning them, except on a matter that is clear, nor consult any of them about (the affair of) the Sleepers.

— Quran, surah 18 (Al-Kahf), ayah 22

The reason being God declaring He Himself is relating what needs to be verified in another verse of surah Al-Kahf (18:13)

We relate to thee their story in truth: they were youths who believed in their Lord, and We advanced them in guidance:

— Quran, surah 18 (Al-Kahf), ayah 13

Regarding consultation with the People of the Book, it is also narrated by Abu Hureyrah in hadith literature:

The people of the Scripture (Jews) used to recite the Torah in Hebrew and they used to explain it in Arabic to the Muslims. On that Allah's Apostle said, "Do not believe the people of the Scripture or disbelieve them, but say: 'We believe in Allah and what is revealed to us'."

— Sahih al-Bukhari, Volume 6, Book 60, Hadith 12

Therefore, in this view, Muslims would not be required to ascribe to the Sefer Yetzirah, even were it to be identified as the Scrolls of Abraham. Furthermore, Muslim theology accepts the original Torah (Tawrat) as revealed to Moses (Musa) or the original Psalms (Zabur) as revealed to David (Dawud), as well as the original Gospel (Injeel) as revealed to Jesus (Isa).

== See also ==
- Book of Abraham, a sacred text in Mormonism
