= List of Christian terms in Arabic =

The following list consists of concepts that are derived from both Christian and Arab tradition, which are expressed as words and phrases in the Arabic language. These terms are included as transliterations, often accompanied by the original Arabic-alphabet orthography. Although Islam is the dominant religion among Arabs, there are a significant number of Arab Christians in regions that were formerly Christian, such as much of the Byzantine empire's lands in the Middle East, so that there are over twenty million Arab Christians living around the world. (Significant populations in Egypt, Lebanon, Brazil, Mexico, Jordan, Syria, Palestine, Sudan, Iraq, USA, Canada, UK and Australia.) Christianity has existed in the Arab world since the 1st century. Arabic is written with the Arabic alphabet, and different individuals and Christian groups may transliterate certain Arabic words into the Latin alphabet in various ways.

== A ==
ʔAʕmālu r-Rusul (أَعْمَالُ الرُّسُل)
The Acts of the Apostles, the fifth book of the Christian New Testament
al-Āb (الآبُ)
God the Father
al-ʿAhd al-Qadīm (اَلْعَهْد اَلْقَدِيم)
Old Testament
al-ʿAhd al-Jadīd (اَلْعَهْد اَلْجَدِيد)
New Testament
Allāh (الله)
literally "God"; is also used as a religious term by Arab Muslims and Arab Jews (Jews who speak Arabic use it mostly within their daily discussions, but not within their religious services, which are said in Hebrew).
Roman Catholics in Malta call God Alla in the Maltese language. The word Allah is also used by Christians in predominantly Islamic countries and countries where both faiths exist side by side regularly such as Indonesia, Malaysia, Lebanon, Turkey, Syria, Egypt, Iraq, etc.
Aiqūna (أَيْقونة)
Icon
As-salamu alaykum (السَلامُ عَلَيكُم)
is a greeting in Arabic that means "Peace be upon you". The salam is a religious salutation among Muslims and is also used by Arab Christians in place of Shalom in the Hebrew language.

== B ==
Bābā (بَابَا)
Pope
Bābā Nuwayl (بَابَا نُوِيل)
Santa Claus (from French "Papa Noël")
Bismi l-Ābi wa l-Ibni wa r-Rūḥi l-Qudus (بِاسْمِ الآبِ وَالاِبْنِ وَالرُّوحِ الْقُدُسِ, also spelled بِسْمِ الآبِ وَالاِبْنِ وَالرُّوحِ الْقُدُسِ)
"In the name of the Father, the Son and the Holy Spirit" (See also: Trinitarian formula, Basmala). Sometimes followed by ألإلهِ الْوَاحِد al-Ilāhi l-Wāḥid "The One God", to emphasize monotheism.
Brūtistāntī (بْرُوتِسْتَانْتِي)
Protestant (a more foreign-imitating pronunciation is Prōtistāntī)

== I ==
‘Īdu Jamī‘il-Qiddīsīn (عِيدُ جَمِيعِ الْقِدِّيسِين)
All Saints' Day
‘Īdu l-‘Anṣarah (عِيدُ الْعَنْصَرَة)
Pentecost
‘Īd al-Burbāra (عيد البربارة)
Literally "the Feast of Barbara". It is the equivalent of Halloween for the Middle Eastern Christians (who generally do not celebrate said holiday), although it is held on 4 December.
‘Īdu l-Fiṣḥ (عِيدُ الْفِصْح) or ‘Īdu l-Qiyāmah (عِيدُ الْقِيامَة)
literally "the Feast of Pesach/Passover" or "Feast of the Resurrection" - Easter
‘Īdu l-Jasad (عِيدُ ْالجَسَد)
The Catholic feast of Corpus Christi
‘Īdu l-Mīlād (عِيدُ الْمِيلاد)
literally "Feast of the Nativity" - Christmas
‘Īdu ṣ-Ṣu‘ūd (‘Īdu Ṣu‘ūdil-Masīḥ) (عِيدُ الصُّعُود)
Feast of the Ascension
Sabtu l-Amwāt (سَبْتُ الأَمْوَات)
literally "Sabbath of the Dead" - All Soul's Day
Injīl (إنجيل)
One of the four gospels (from Greek Ευαγγελια "Good News"); Muslims use it in the original sense as the message of Jesus, either only orally transmitted or recorded in a hypothetical scripture, like the Torah and the Quran, containing God's revelations to Jesus. According to them, the gospels partially contain the revealed words or are corrupted copies of the hypothetical original.
Intiqāl al-ʿAḏrā (انتقال العذراء)
Assumption of Mary (literally: "Assumption of the Virgin")

== K ==
Kanīsa (كَنِيسة)
Church, similar to the Hebrew Knesset literally "Assembly". See Alcañiz for a Spanish cognate through Mozarabic.
Kārdināl (كاردينال)
Cardinal
Kathūlīkī (كَاثُولِيكِيّ)
Catholic
Kātidrā'iyyah (كَاتِدْرَائِيَّة)
Cathedral
al-Kitāb al-Muqaddas (اَلْكِتَاب اَلْمُقَدَّس)
Bible (literally "the Holy Scripture")

== M ==
Maryamu l-‘Adhra' (مَرْيَمُ الْعَذْرَاء)
Virgin Mary
al-Masīḥ (اَلْمَسِيح)
Christ or Messiah
al-Masīḥiyyah (اَلْمَسِيحِيَّة)
Christianity
Masīḥī (مَسِيحِيّ)
Christian (literally "Messianic")
al-Mazmur (اَلْمَزْمُوْر)
Psalms
Mubaššir (مُبَشِّر)
Christian missionary (positive sense, literally means "carrier of good news")
Munaṣṣir (مُنَصِّر )
Christian missionary (neutral sense, literally "Christianizer")

== N ==
an-Naṣīra (اَلنَّاصِرَة)
Nazareth
Naṣrānī (نَصْرَانِيّ)
A traditional Islamic term for Christians (literally "Nazarene"). Arab Christians prefer Masīḥī (مَسِيحِيّ).
Nāṣirī (نَاصِرِيّ)
Person from Nazareth (also a follower of Gamal Abdel Nasser)

== O ==
Orthodhoksiyya (أُرْثُوذُكْسِيّة)
Orthodox Christianity

Orthodhoksī (أُرْثُوذُكْسِيّ)
Orthodox Christian

== Q ==
Qibti, Qubti (قُبْطِيّ)
Coptic

Qiddīs, Muqaddas (قديس - مقدس )
Saint, holy, sacred

Quddās (قداس)
Mass

al-Quddās al-ʔilāhī القداس الإلهي
the Divine Liturgy, the term used predominantly among Orthodox and most Eastern Catholic Christians for the Eucharistic liturgy, corresponding to the Holy Mass of Christians practicing Western or Latin Christian Rites.

== R ==
ar-Rūḥu l-Qudus (اَلرُّوحُ اَلْقُدُسُ)
The Holy Spirit

Ruqād as-Sayyida al-ʿAḏrāʾ (رقاد السيّدة العذراء)
the Dormition of the Mother of God

Rusūl (رسول), pl. Rusul (رسل)
Apostle

== S ==
Ṣalīb (صليب)
Cross
Šahīd (شهيد)
Martyr (The same term is used in Islamic terminology for the "martyrs of Islam", but the meaning is different) literal meaning of the word shahid is "witness" i.e. witness of god/believer in God.
Sim‘ānu l-Ghayūr (سِمْعَانُ الْغَيُور)
Simon the Zealot
Sim‘ānu Butrus (سِمْعَانُ بطرس)
Simon Peter

== T ==
Tabšīr (تَبْشِير)
literally "the Spreading of Good News" - Christian missionary work
Talāmīḏ al-Masīḥ (تلاميذ المسيح)
The Twelve Apostles (literally "Disciples of the Messiah")
Tanṣīr or Ta‘mīd (تَنْصِير or تَعْمِيد)
literally "making someone Naṣrānī i.e. Christian, or baptizing him/her" - To confer the Christian Sacrament(or Mystery) of Baptism سر العماد أو المعمودية Sirr al-‘imād or al-ma‘mūdiyyah.
Tajassud (تَجَسُّد)
Incarnation (of Jesus Christ)
ath-Thālūth (اَلثَّالُوث)
The Holy Trinity
Tawbah (تَوْبَة)
Repentance

== U ==
Ūrasalīm (أُورَسلِيم)
Arabic transliteration from Hebrew of Jerusalem (as opposed to the Islamic Arabic term al-Quds أَلْقُدْس). Also the official Arabic name for Jerusalem used by the Israeli government.

Ūsquf (أُسْقُف)
Bishop (pl. أَسَاقِفَة), Archbishop (رَئِيسُ الْأَسَاقِفَة)

== W ==
Wālidatu l-ʔilāhi (والدة الإله)
the Theotokos, lit. 'the Birthgiver of God,' the epithet with which Orthodox and most Eastern Catholic Christians use to refer to Mary, the Mother of God.

== Y ==
Yasū‘ (يَسُوعَ)
Christian Arabic version of the name of Jesus (as opposed to the Islamic Arabic term Isa عيسى)
Yasū‘u l-Masīḥ (يَسُوعُ المسيح)
Jesus Christ (literally "Jesus the Messiah")
al-Jum‘atu l-Ḥazīna (أَلْجُمْعَةُ الْحَزيِنَة)
Good Friday Popular usage (literally "Sad Friday")
al-Jum‘atu l-‘Aẓīma (أَلْجُمْعَةُ الْعَظِيمَة)
Good Friday Official usage (literally "Great Friday")
Yahūḏā al-Isḫaryūṭī (يهوذا الإسخريوطي)
Judas Iscariot
Yuḥanna (يُوحَنَّا)
Christian Arabic version of the name of John (as opposed to the Islamic Arabic term Yaḥya يَحْيَى)

== Z ==
Zabūr (زَبُور)
The Psalms, in Islam referred to as Zabur, a holy book revealed by God to David. The Christian term is Mazāmīr مزامير; singular mazmūr مزمور.

== See also ==
- Glossary of Islam
- Bible translations into Arabic
