= Gospel in Islam =

Christian Gospel from an Islamic perspective

Injeel (Arabic: إِنْجِيل, romanized: ʾInjīl, pl. أَنَاجِيل ʾanājīl) is the Arabic name for the Gospel of Jesus (ʿĪsā). This Injil is described by the Quran as one of the four Islamic holy books which was revealed by Allah, the others being the Zabur (traditionally understood as being the Psalms), the Tawrat (the Torah), and the Quran itself. The word Injil is also used in the Quran, the hadith and early Muslim documents to refer to both a book and revelations made by God to Jesus.

The Injil corresponds to the revelation or text given to Jesus or even to the New Testament or the entire Christian Bible or canon. Many Muslim scholars view the Christian New Testament as a different text from the Injil mentioned in the Qur’an, because they viewed the New Testament as later inventions that does not preserve the original Injil revealed to Jesus (Isa). However, on the idea that early scriptures revealed by God were altered, misinterpreted or corrupted; (taḥrīf) is used by Muslim scholars as a framework to explain doctrinal divergence between Islam and Christianity, regarding the New Testament or the Bible in general. Some studies have also analyzed early Islamic view regarding Paul’s contribution to the misinterpretation of Jesus’ teaching within these framework. Other studies have analyzed the Muslim views of the Injil and other scriptures in the first four centuries of Islam.

== Etymology ==
The Arabic word Injīl (إنجيل) as found in Islamic texts and now used also by non-Arab Muslims and non-Muslim Arabs is popularly believed to come from the Classical Syriac: ܐܘܢܓܠܝܘܢ, romanized: ewangellīōn found in the Peshitta, the Syriac translation of the Bible. This, in turn, derives from Koine Greek: Εὐαγγέλιον of the New Testament, where it means “good news” (compare Old English gōdspel; Modern English gospel, or evangel as an archaism; cf. e.g. Spanish evangelio).

Some scholars believe that Injīl comes from Koinē Greek Euangélion (Εύαγγέλιον) via Ethiopic Wangēl (ወንጌል).

The word Injīl occurs twelve times in the Qurʾān.

== Identification ==
Although both the Qur'an and its earliest interpreters assume that the Biblical text is broadly authentic, teachings about its corruption appeared later in history. According to Ilka Lindstedt of the University of Helsinki, nowhere is the corruption of the Jewish or Christian scriptures stated in the Qu'ran, but only its misinterpretation. Mehdy Shaddel writes that the Qur'an is 'decidedly non-supercessionist. In none of the proclamations addressed to Jews and Christians in the text does it assert that their belief systems, scriptures, or way of life are misguided or have been abrogated.'; the Quran confirms what the Jews and Christians already possess (Q 2:89), and it confirms the continued relevance of the Torah and Gospel held by Jews and Christians of the time as a binding source of law.

According to mainstream Sunni Islam, the Injīl is the divinely revealed physical scripture granted to Jesus (ʿĪsā) by God, referenced in several Qurʾānic passages, notably in 5:46–47. It is described as a guidance-filled and light-bearing scripture that confirms the Torah. Mainstream Islamic theology holds that the original Injīl was not preserved in its revealed form but was subjected to taḥrīf—a process of textual and doctrinal alteration over time. For example, Abdullah Yusuf Ali wrote:

The Injil (Greek, Evangel equals Gospel) spoken of by the Qur'an is not the New Testament. It is not the four Gospels now received as canonical. It is the single Gospel which, Islam teaches, was revealed to Jesus, and which he taught. Fragments of it survive in the received canonical Gospels and in some others, of which traces survive (e.g., the Gospel of Childhood or the Nativity, the Gospel of St. Barnabas, etc.)."

Most Muslims do not identify the Injīl with the four canonical Gospels of the New Testament. Rather, they view those texts as later, human-authored biographies composed decades after Jesus’s lifetime. Islamic theology maintains that the original revelation may have already been lost or obscured before these texts were written, but they agree that the Injil/Gospel was a physical scripture. While the Gospels may preserve indirect echoes of the original message, they are not considered divinely revealed scripture.

From a textual standpoint, Christian scholars generally assert that the New Testament Gospels have been reliably preserved through a large and early manuscript tradition.

While most Muslims do not believe that the Injeel of the Qur'an refers to the gospels written by the New Testament Apostles, some Muslims identify the Gospel of Thomas as being the Injeel of Jesus.

Scholars state that the Quran shows deep reverence for these scriptures as preserved both essentially as we have them today and at the time of the prophet; and that many major interpreters of the Quran (tafsir) did as well, with any issues being over interpretation instead of textual corruption. A study of Muslim views of the Bible in the first four centuries observed that positive views of preservation of previous scriptures is prevalent in the Quran itself, even in the few verses expressing a negative view, and the view of positive preservation is also found among early commentators due to the belief that Muhammad was in the previous scriptures. Analysis of early commentaries (tafsir) on the Quranic understanding of tampering of previous scriptures indicate that at the beginning even the words commentators used to describe tampering did not imply or mean textual corruption, as Muhammad was understood to be in the Torah, at least. Biblical scholars note that the manuscript evidence of the New Testament verifies that it was the same as in the time of Muhammad and before, so a dilemma between the revelations by the same deity emerges.

== In Qur'anic exegesis ==
The Islamic methodology of tafsīr al-Qurʾān bi’l-kitāb (Arabic: تفسير القرآن بالكتاب, "Interpreting the Quran with the Bible") involves interpreting the Qurʾān in light of earlier scriptures such as the Torah and the Gospel. This method was notably employed by scholars like Ibrahim ibn Umar al-Biqa'i (d. 1480), who quoted Arabic translations of the Bible in his Qurʾānic commentary to draw literary and theological parallels. Other notable Muslim mufassirun (commentators) or philosophers of the Bible and Qur'an who weaved biblical texts together with Qur'anic ones include Abu al-Hakam Abd al-Salam bin al-Isbili of Al-Andalus, Hamid al-Din al-Kirmani, and the Brethren of Purity.

However, this approach remained controversial and limited in scope. Mainstream Sunni scholarship has traditionally discouraged affirming or denying Biblical narratives unless supported by the Qurʾān or authentic hadith. As Griffith notes, Muslim exegetes were aware of the Prophet's reported counsel not to confirm or reject reports from the People of the Book, instead affirming belief in the revelation sent to both communities.

== See also ==
- Biblical and Quranic narratives
- Christianity and Islam
- Islamic view of the Christian Bible
- List of Christian terms in Arabic
- Scrolls of Abraham
