= David in Islam =

Islamic view of David

Prophet Dāwūd Alayhi as-Salam
- دَاوُود; David
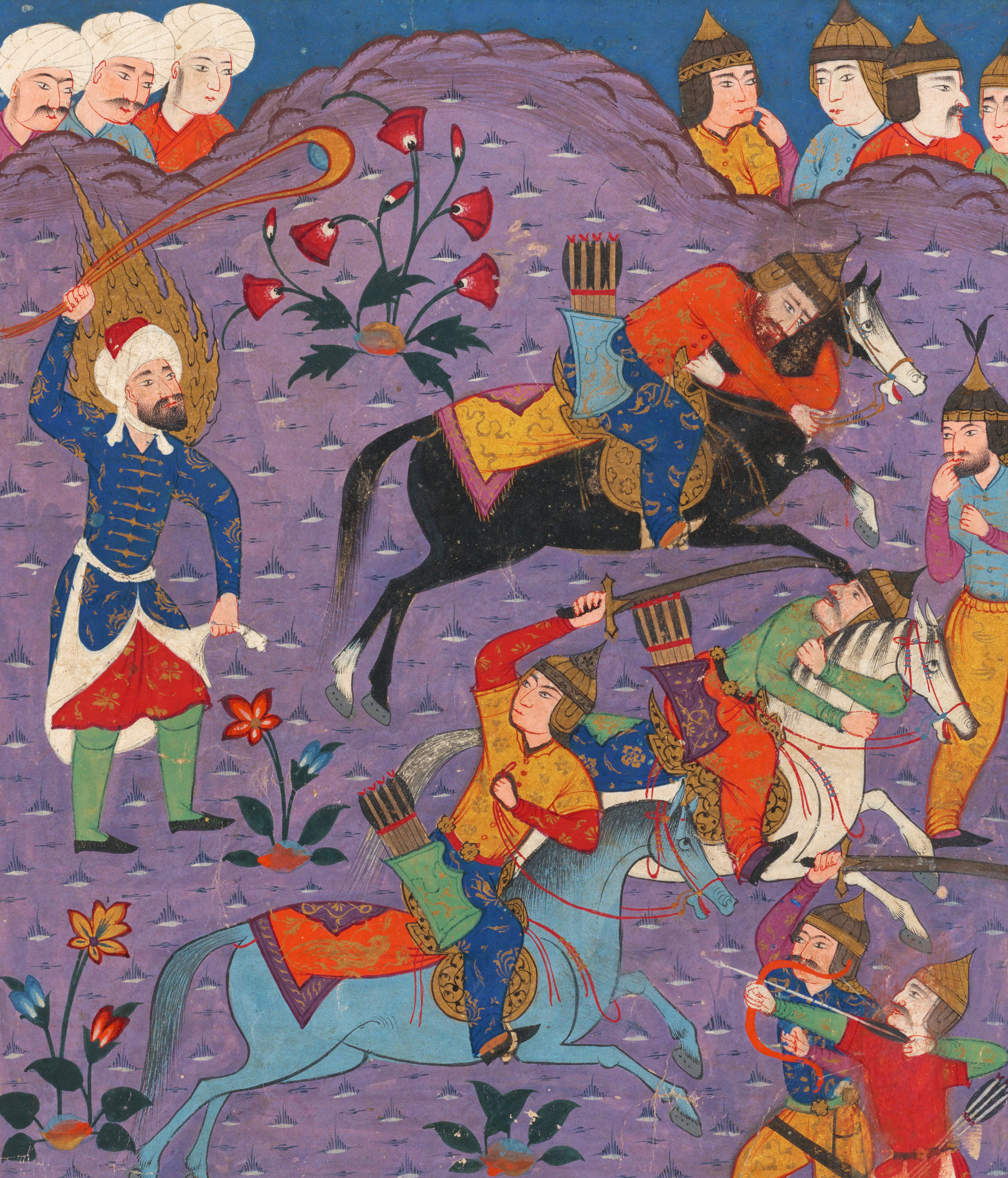
- Dawud defeating the army of Jalut with his slingshot

Prophet of Islam
- Preceded by: Ṣamūʾīl
- Succeeded by: Sulaymān

Khalifa (Note: Viceroy or viceregent; see Caliphate#Qur'an) of Earth King of the Israelites
- Preceded by: Talut
- Succeeded by: Sulaymān

Personal life
- Born: 10th century BCE; Jerusalem, Kingdom of Israel
- Died: 9th century BCE; Jerusalem, Kingdom of Israel
- Spouse: Unknown
- Children: Sulaymān
- Known for: Defeating Jalut; Being the Khalifa (Viceroy) on Earth and the Wise King of Banī Isrāʾīl; Receiving the Zabur; Prophesying to and warning Israel; Being highly gifted musically and vocally

Religious life
- Religion: Islam
- Profession: Ironsmith

Dāwūd, or David (Note: Hebrew: דָּוִד, romanized: Dāwīḏ, Syriac: ܕܘܝܕ, romanized: Dawīd, Koine Greek: Δαυίδ, romanized: Dauíd), is considered a prophet and messenger of Allah (God) in Islam, as well as a righteous, divinely anointed king of the United Kingdom of Israel. Additionally, Muslims also revere David for receiving the divine revelation of the Zabur.

Dawud is considered one of the most important people in Islam. Mentioned sixteen times in the Quran, David appears in the Islamic scripture as a link in the chain of prophets who preceded Muhammad. Although he is not usually considered one of the "law-giving" prophets (ulū al-ʿazm), "he is far from a marginal figure" in Islamic thought. In later Islamic traditions, he is praised for his rigor in prayer and fasting. He is also presented as the prototypical just ruler and as a symbol of God's authority on earth, having been at once a king and a prophet.

David is particularly important to the religious architecture of Islamic Jerusalem. Dawud is known as biblical David who was, according to the Hebrew Bible, the second king of the United Kingdom of Israel and Judah, reigning c. 1010–970 BCE.

== Name ==
The Quranic Arabic form of David is Dāwud or Dāwūd, differing from Koine Greek: Δαυίδ and Syriac: ܕܘܝܕ, romanized: Dawīd (which follow Hebrew: דָּוִד, romanized: Dāwīd). These forms appear in the Quran sixteen times.

== Narrative in the Quran ==
David's narrative in the Quran, in many respects, parallels that given in the Bible. He is named a prophet (nabī) and also a messenger (rasūl), David is included in lists of those who received revelation (waḥy; Q4:163) or guidance (hudā; 6:84) from God. In both lists his name appears next to that of his son Solomon. Elsewhere, the Quran explains that God gave to both of them the gifts of "sound judgment" (ḥukm; 21:78) and "knowledge" (ʿilm; 21:79; 27:15). Yet the Quran also ascribes to David merits that distinguish him from Solomon: David killed Goliath (2:251) and received a divine revelation named "the Psalms" (Quran 17:55 uses an indefinite form, while 21:105 uses the definite form al-Zabūr), presumably a reference to the Psalms or the Psalter (the term Zabūr is perhaps related to the Hebrew term mizmōr or Syriac mazmūrā, "psalm"). The mountains and the birds praised God along with David (21:79; in 34:10 God commands them to do so; cfr. Psalm 148:7–10). God made David a "vicegerent" (khalīfa; 38:26), a title that the Quran otherwise gives only to Adam (2:30). This title suggests that, according to the Quran, David was something more than a messenger: he was a divinely guided leader who established God's rule on Earth. This role is also suggested by 2:251: "God gave him authority (mulk) and wisdom (ḥikmah) and taught him what He willed. If God did not drive back some people by others, the earth would become corrupt."

Among the things taught to David was the ability to make armour (21:80, 34:10–11), a suggestion that David's military exploits were the act of God. It is also important that the Quranic reference to David's "wisdom" was sometimes explained by the classical exegetes as the gift of prophecy. The Quran also connects David and Jesus, by insisting that both cursed Jews against their prophecy who did not believe (5:78). Moreover, according to the Quran, David was given the ability to distinguish between truth and falsehood when dispensing justice (faṣl al-khiṭāb, 38:20). Furthermore, there is the allusion to a test David was put through, wherein he prayed and repented and God forgave him (38:24-5). Surat Sad (the 38th chapter of the Quran) is also called "the sūra of David" Exegetes explain that since David prostrated when asking God to forgive him, Muhammad was ordered to imitate him and to perform a prostration when reading this chapter.

== Religious significance ==
David is one of the few Islamic Prophets who received Kingship as well. While other prophets preached during the reign of kings, David, in his time, was the king. Thus, he received an extremely large task, of making sure that the people of Israel were not only held in check spiritually but that the country itself remained strong as well. His place as both leader and prophet is revered by all Muslims as one of extremely high rank. The figure of David, together with that of his prophetic son, Solomon, are iconic of people who ruled justly over their land. God frequently mentions David's high rank as a prophet and messenger in the Quran. He is often mentioned alongside other prophets to emphasize how great he was. For example, God says:

And We gave him Isaac and Jacob and guided them, as We had guided Noah before them, and of his descendants, David and Solomon and Job and Joseph and Moses and Aaron. Thus We reward those who are upright and do good.

— Quran 6:84

When the Caliph 'Umar visited Jerusalem, the Patriarch Sophronius accompanied him on the Temple Mount, while he searched for the Mihrab Dawud (David's prayer-niche) to perform a prayer. Later commentators identified this site with the Tower of David. In a hadith, the prayer and fasting of David is mentioned to be dear to God.

Narrated Abdullah bin 'Amr bin Al-'As: The Apostle of Allah told me, "The most beloved prayer to Allah is that of David and the most beloved fasts to Allah are those of David. He used to sleep for half of the night and then pray for one third of the night and again sleep for its sixth part and used to fast on alternate days."

— Muhammad al-Bukhari, Sahih al-Bukhari

=== The Book of David ===
The Zabur is the holy book attributed to David by God, just as Musa (Moses) received the Tawrat (Torah), Isa (Jesus) received the Injil (Gospel) and Muhammad received the Quran. In the Bible, the Zabur is known as the Psalms.

Your Lord knows whoever is in the heavens and the earth. We exalted some of the prophets over the others; and to David We gave the Book of Psalms.

— Quran 17:55

== Bibliography ==
=== Qur'an references ===
- David killed Goliath and received divine authority and wisdom: 2:251
- Among the people receiving revelation or guidance: 4:163, 6:84
- Jews cursed by David and Jesus for disbelieving in their prophecies: 5:78
- Received Psalms: 17:55
- David and Solomon are gifted with sound judgement, wisdom and knowledge. Mountains and birds praised God along with David; the praise is commanded by God elsewhere: 21:78-79, 34:10-11
- God orders family of David to work gratefully: 34:13
- God highlights David, his strength, devotion, divinely supported kingship, a moral trial that led to repentance, and his appointment as a just ruler whose legacy continued through Solomon: 38:17-30

=== Primary ===
- ʿAbdallāh b. al-Mubārak, Kitāb al-Zuhd, ed. Ḥ.R. al-Aʿẓamī, Beirut n.d., 161-4
- Aḥmad b. Ḥanbal, al-Zuhd, Cairo 1987, 111–2, 114, 134
- R.G. Khoury, Wahb b. Munabbih (Codices arabici antiqui i), Wiesbaden 1972 (with bibliography)
- id., Les légendes prophétiques dans l'Islam depuis le Ier jusqu'au IIIe siècle de l'hégire (Codices arabici antiqui iii), Wiesbaden 1978, 157-74
- Hibat Allāh b. Salāma, al-Nāsikh wa-l-mansūkh (in the margin of Wāḥidī, Asbāb), Cairo 1316/1898-9, 262
- Ibn Qudāma al-Maqdisī, Kitāb al-Tawwābīn, ed. ʿA.Q. Arnāʾūṭ, Beirut 1974
- Majlisī, Biḥār al-anwār, Beirut 1983, xiv, 1-64; lxxiv, 39-44
- Muqātil, Tafsīr, i, 423; ii, 87–8, 639–43; iii, 87–8, 298–9, 525-6
- Sibṭ Ibn al-Jawzī, Mirʾāt, i, 472-92
- Suyūṭī, Durr, vii, 148-76
- Ṭabarī, Tafsīr, v, 360-76
- Ṭabarsī, Majmaʿ

=== Secondary ===
- A. Geiger, Judaism and Islam, Madras 1898, 144-5
- E. Margoliouth, The convicted in the Bible, cleared from guilt in the Talmud and Midrash (Hebrew), London 1949, 60-7
- F.A. Mojtabāʾī, Dāwūd, in Encyclopædia Iranica, vii, 161-2
- R. Paret, Dāwūd, in ei2, ii, 182
- Y. Zakovitch, David. From shepherd to Messiah (Hebrew), Jerusalem 1995 (see especially Annex A by A. Shinʾan, 181–99)

== See also ==
- Al-Arḍ Al-Muqaddasah ("The Holy Land")
- Biblical and Quranic narratives
- Legends and the Quran
- Qisas Al-Anbiyaʾ ("Stories of The Prophets")
- Liwa Dawud, Syrian rebel group named after David
