= Scrolls of Moses =

Document mentioned in the Quran

The Scrolls of Moses (Arabic: صحف موسى Ṣuḥuf Mūsā) are an ancient body of scripture mentioned in the Quran, once each in Surah Al-Aʻlā and Surah An-Najm. They are part of the religious scriptures of Islam.

== Background ==
In two Chapters, which are dated from the first Meccan period, there is a reference to the 'Leaves, Scrolls, Journals' (Suhuf) of Abraham (and of Moses), by which certain divinely inspired texts handwritten by the patriarchs are meant. These passages refer to the fact that the truth of God's message was present in the earliest revelations, Given to Abraham and Moses. Although Suhuf is generally understood to mean 'Scrolls', some translators - including Abdullah Yusuf Ali and Marmaduke Pickthall - have translated the verse as "The Books of Abraham and Moses".

== Qur'anic mention ==
Moses, being a prophet of God, received a number of revelations over his lifetime - the contents of which could be contained in this Book of Moses.

- Most surely this is in the earlier scriptures. The Books of Abraham and Moses.
  — Qur'an, Surah 87 (Al-Ala), ayat 18-19
- "Or, has he not been informed of what is in the scriptures of Moses? And (of) Abraham who fulfilled (the commandments)
  — Qur'an, Surah 53 (Al-Najm) ayat 36-37

== Identification ==
Jordanian scholar and professor of philosophy Ghazi bin Muhammad mentions that the "Scrolls of Moses" are identical to the Torah of Moses.

Some scholars have speculated whether the "Books of Moses" refer to the Torah or other scriptures of Moses. But the Islamic belief that the Torah was, in its original form, a single scripture of Law, the plural emphasis on Books and not Book leads some to believe that these Books are different. Qur'anic commentator Abdullah Yusuf Ali mentions that it could be a possible reference to a lost book of the Israelites, suggesting the Book of the Wars of the Lord, an apocryphal book referred to in the Bible, in Numbers 21:14.

However, it is well known that the Jews usually refer to the Torah as The Five Books of Torah. Most notably, Deuteronomy, the fifth book, is distinct in a number of ways, and is referred to as 'Mishneh Torah' - a review of the Torah. There's also an ancient guideline requiring religious scribes to leave four blank lines between each of the books. This custom (recorded in Babylonian Talmud, bava batra pg.13) predated Muhammad by hundreds of years. For this reason it is plausible to assume that the Quran is referring to the five scrolls of Moses as they were known.

== See also ==
- Islamic holy books
- Sixth and Seventh Books of Moses
