= Book of the Wars of the Lord =

Lost book mentioned in Numbers 21:13–14

The Book of the Wars of the LORD (Hebrew: ספר מלחמת יהוה, romanized: sêp̄er milḥămōṯ Yahweh) is one of the non-canonical books referenced in the Bible that have been lost. It is mentioned in Numbers 21:13–14, which reads:

From there they set out and camped on the other side of the Arnon, which is in the desert and bounding the Amorite territory. For Arnon is the border of Moab, between Moab and the Amorites. That is why the Book of the Wars of the LORD says: '...Waheb in Suphah and the ravines of Arnon, and at the stream of the ravines that lead to the dwelling of Ar, which lies along the border of Moab.'

— Numbers 21:13–14

David Rosenberg suggests in The Book of David that it was written circa 1100 BC. Theologian Joseph Barber Lightfoot suggested it was another title for the biblical Book of Jasher.

The medieval Book of Jasher calls The Book of the Wars of the LORD a collaborative record Moses, Joshua, and the children of Israel wrote. It was likely a collection of victory songs about Israel's military conquest of Canaan.

In Exodus 17:14, God tells Moses to inscribe an Israelite military victory over the Amalekites in an unnamed book and recount it later before his successor Joshua. Some Torah scholars such as Moses ibn Ezra have suggested this book may refer to the Book of the Wars of the LORD.

== See also ==
- Bible
- Lost work
- Books of the Bible
- Milhamoth ha-Shem (the title of several Hebrew polemical texts)
- War of the Sons of Light Against the Sons of Darkness
