= Gospel =

Books on the life and teachings of Jesus Christ

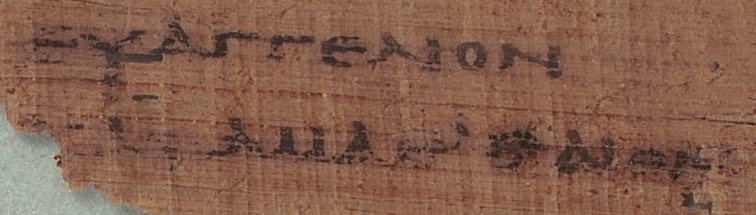
Fragment of a flyleaf with the title of the Gospel of Matthew, ευανγελιον κ̣ατ̣α μαθ᾽θαιον (Euangelion kata Maththaion). From Papyrus 4 (c. AD 200), it is the earliest manuscript title for Matthew and one of the earliest manuscript titles for any gospel.

A gospel is a loose-knit, episodic narrative of the words and deeds of Jesus Christ, culminating in his trial and death, and concluding with various reports of his post-resurrection appearances. It originally meant the Christian message ("the gospel"), but in the second century AD, the term euangélion (Koine Greek: εὐαγγέλιον, lit. 'good news') came to be used also for the books in which the message was reported, through which the English word "gospel" originated as a calque.

The canonical gospels represent a variation of Greco-Roman biography. Ancient biographies were typically written shortly after the subject's death and included substantial historical material. They are meant to convince people that Jesus was a miracle-working holy man and provide examples to emulate. As such, they present the Christian message of the second half of the first century AD. Biblical scholars are therefore cautious of relying on the gospels uncritically as historical documents, and although they afford a good idea of Jesus' public career, critical study has largely failed to distinguish his original ideas from those of the later Christian authors, and the focus of research has therefore shifted to Jesus as remembered by his followers, (Note: In "Jesus Remembered (2003), Dunn asesses "what 'goes back to Jesus'." Dunn (2003, p. 329): "I emphasize again that I do not envisage 'getting back to Jesus' himself. All we have are the impressions which Jesus made, the remembered Jesus.") and understanding the Gospels themselves.

The canonical gospels are the four which appear in the New Testament. They were written between AD 70 and 100. Like many ancient biographers such as Plutarch, they do not name their authors. They were attributed to the apostles very early and their authorship is debated in scholarship. Mark was the first to be written, followed by Matthew and Luke, which forms a two-volume work with the Acts of the Apostles. (Note: In the two-source hypothesis Matthew and Luke used Mark and a hypothetical source Q, though alternative hypotheses that posit the direct use of Matthew by Luke or vice versa without Q are rising.) Scholars increasingly favor the author of John’s knowledge of the synoptic gospels. Scholars differ on the reliability of the traditions found in the gospels. The synoptic gospels are the primary sources for reconstructing Christ's ministry, while John is used less since it differs from the synoptics. (Note: Sanders (2010): "John, however, is so different that it cannot be reconciled with the Synoptics except in very general ways [...] Scholars have unanimously chosen the Synoptic Gospels' version of Jesus' teaching [...] The Synoptic Gospels, then, are the primary sources for knowledge of the historical Jesus. They are not, however, the equivalent of an academic biography of a recent historical figure. Instead, the Synoptic Gospels are theological documents that provide information the authors regarded as necessary for the religious development of the Christian communities in which they worked.") Current research emphasizes the gospels as the works of creative authors with their own agendas while recognizing their preservation of the memory of Jesus.

Many non-canonical gospels were also written after the four canonical gospels, and like them advocate for the theological views of their authors. Important examples include the gospels of Thomas, Peter, Judas, and Mary; infancy gospels such as that of James (the first to introduce the perpetual virginity of Mary); and gospel harmonies such as the Diatessaron.

== Etymology ==
Gospel is the Old English translation of the Hellenistic Greek term εὐαγγέλιον (evangélion), meaning "good news"; this may be seen from analysis of ευαγγέλιον (evangélion) (εὖ (ef) "good" + ἄγγελος (ángelos) "messenger" + -ιον (ion) diminutive suffix). The Greek term was Latinized as evangelium in the Vulgate, and translated into Latin as bona annuntiatio. In Old English, it was translated as gōdspel (gōd "good" + spel "news"). The Old English term was retained as gospel in Middle English Bible translations and hence remains in use also in Modern English.

Encyclopaedia Britannica defines gospel as stemming from gōdspel "good story/news," a calque translating Latin evangelium from Greek εὐαγγέλιον "good news."

== Canonical gospels: Matthew, Mark, Luke and John ==
Canonical Gospels
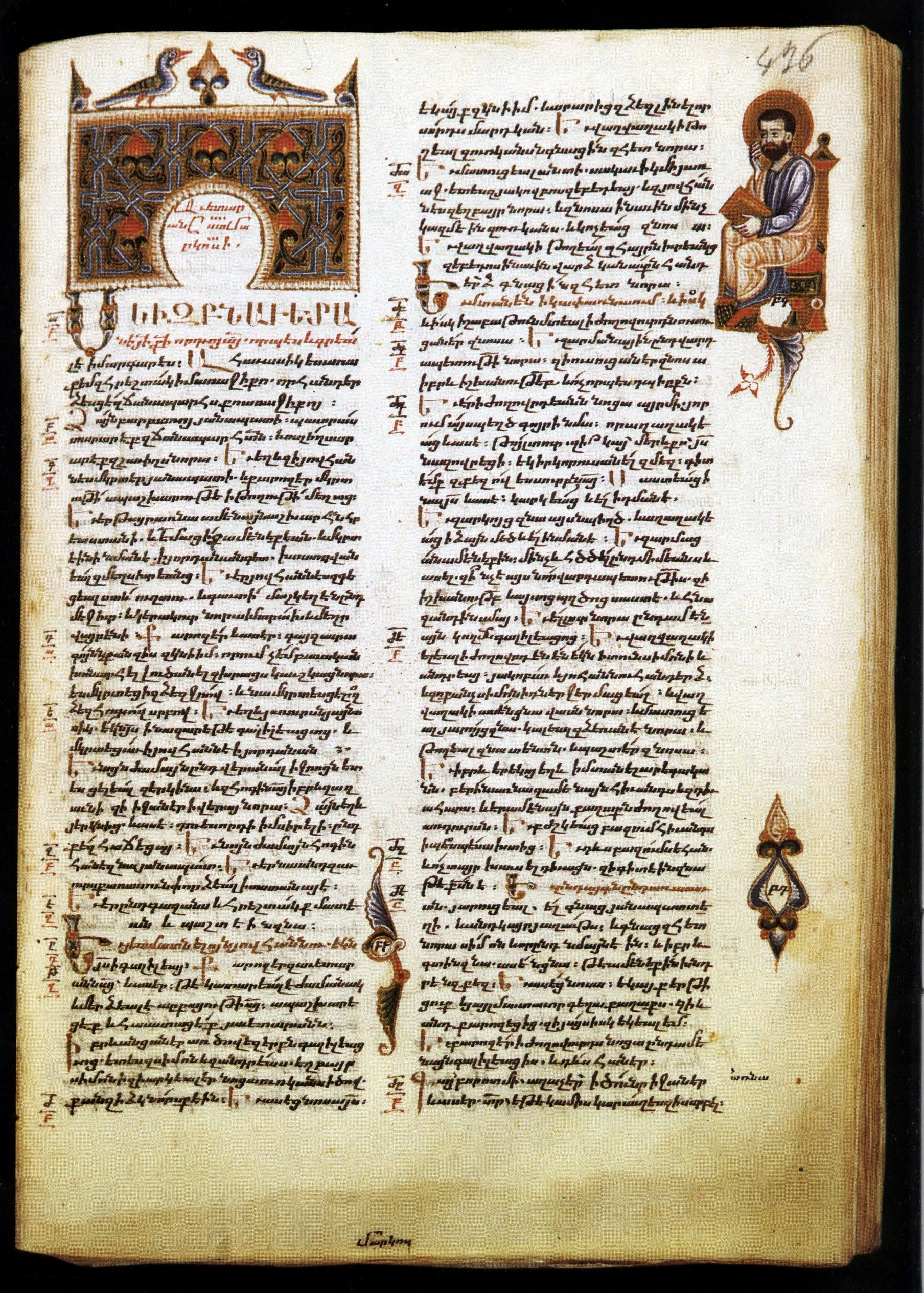
- The first page of the Gospel of Mark in Armenian, by Sargis Pitsak, 14th century

Information
- Religion: Christianity
- Language: Koine Greek
- Period: Apostolic Age
- Chapters: 89
- Verses: 3,779

=== Contents ===
The four canonical gospels share the same basic outline of the life of Jesus: he begins his public ministry in conjunction with that of John the Baptist, calls disciples, teaches and heals and confronts the Pharisees, dies on the cross, and is raised from the dead. Each has its own distinctive understanding of him and his divine role and modern scholars recognize their differences over attempts at harmonization. The patterns of parallels and differences found in the gospels are typical of ancient biographies about actual people and history, and are thus unproblematic if not read anachronistically. According to the manuscript evidence and citation frequency by the early Church Fathers, Matthew and John were the most popular gospels while Luke and Mark were less popular in the early centuries of the Church.

The gospels according to Matthew, Mark and Luke are termed the "synoptic gospels" (from Ancient Greek: σύνοψις, romanized: synopsis, "seeing all together") because they present very similar accounts of the life of Jesus. Mark begins with the baptism of the adult Jesus and the heavenly declaration that he is the son of God; he gathers followers and begins his ministry, and tells his disciples that he must die in Jerusalem but that he will rise from the dead; in Jerusalem, he is at first acclaimed but then rejected, betrayed, and crucified, and when the women who have followed him come to his tomb, they find it empty. Whilst not as overt as John's Gospel (the fourth and non-synoptic gospel) scholars have found that the synoptic gospels portray Jesus as divine in various ways. Mark apparently believes that he had a normal human parentage and birth, and makes no attempt to trace his ancestry back to King David or Adam; it originally ended at Mark 16:8 and had no post-resurrection appearances, although Mark 16:7, in which the young man discovered in the tomb instructs the women to tell "the disciples and Peter" that Jesus will see them again in Galilee, hints that the author knew of the tradition.

The authors of Matthew and Luke added different infancy and resurrection narratives to the story they found in Mark. Luke forms a two-volume work with its sequel, the Acts of the Apostles. Barker suggests that Luke supplemented Matthew's nativity by adding Mary's perspective to Matthew's Joseph. Recent scholarship focuses on explaining the gospels' relationship in terms of ancient compositional practices and comparisons with other ancient historical biographers. Each also makes subtle theological changes to Mark, though James Barker argues this is exaggerated, with ancient rhetorical practices explaining many differences in the gospels instead. The Markan miracle stories, for example, confirm Jesus' status as an emissary of God (which was Mark's understanding of the Messiah), but in Matthew they demonstrate his divinity, and the "young man" who appears at Jesus' tomb in Mark becomes a radiant angel in Matthew. Luke is not especially critical of the content of Mark but mainly corrects his source's grammatical syntax, lection, and style instead.

John, the most overtly theological, is the first to make Christological judgements outside the context of the narrative of Jesus's life. He presents a significantly different picture of Jesus's career, omitting any mention of his early life, baptism, and temptation. John knows and presupposes synoptic stories and thusly emphasizes other narratives rather than recounting every passage. The chronology is also different, describing the passage of three years in Jesus's ministry in contrast to the single year of the synoptics, placing the cleansing of the Temple at the beginning, and the Last Supper on the day before Passover. However, there are also verses such as Mark 14:49 and Matthew 23:37 viewed as hints of a longer ministry in the synoptic gospels. Ancient writing practices involved such chronological displacement and changes, with even reliable biographers including Plutarch displaying them. According to Delbert Burkett, the Gospel of John is the only gospel to call Jesus God, though other scholars including Larry Hurtado and Michael Barber view a possible divine Christology in the synoptics. In contrast to Mark, where Jesus hides his identity as messiah, in John he openly proclaims it.

=== Composition ===
Like the rest of the New Testament, the four canonical gospels were written in Koine Greek. The Gospel of Mark probably dates from around AD 70, Matthew and Luke around AD 80–90, and John AD 90–100, which puts their composition likely within the lifetimes of various eyewitnesses, including Jesus's own family. Despite the traditional ascriptions, all four are anonymous, as was common for bios of the time; biographies by Plutarch and Suetonius were also originally anonymous as well. They are generally agreed not to represent eyewitness accounts, though this may partly be the result of dubious form-critical assumptions. Most scholars view the author of Luke–Acts as an eyewitness to Paul. However, Paul never met Jesus, he was still a contemporary of Jesus and personally knew eyewitnesses of Jesus such as his closest disciples (Peter and John) and brother James since the mid 30s AD, within a few years of the crucifixion (c. 30–33 AD). He had knowledge of the life of Jesus and his teachings. (Note: Some examples of Paul's knowledge of the life and teachings of Jesus : born of a woman (Gal 4:4), from David's lineage (Rom 1:3); upbringing as Jew under the Law (Gal 4:4); had 12 apostles (1 Cor 15:5) and siblings (Gal 1:19, 1 Cor 9:5); the Last Supper and was betrayed (1 Cor 11:23–25); was crucified (1 Cor 2:2, Gal 3:1); Jewish involvement in his death (1 Thess 2:14–15); burial, resurrection, appearances to others (1 Cor 15:4–8); Sermon on the Mount allusions, also drawing on the Hebrew Bible (Rom 12:17–19, Prov 25:21–22, Deut 32:35); paying taxes message echoes "Render to Caesar," although, not direct quote (Rom 13:7); divorce and marriage (1 Cor 7:10)) Before the gospels were written, he claimed to have had a vision of Jesus after his death, and later met his brother James. The form-critics largely viewed the gospels as compilers of transmitted traditions, but the gospels are now seen as biographers engaging in literarily creative and imaginative form of art (which did involve claiming consulting eyewitnesses). Though the texts are anonymous, many scholars such as Simon J. Gathercole have defended the attributions to Luke and John, though many others have abandoned this view, though even they continue to maintain the beloved disciple in the last supper as the source of much of John's content

The form critics of the 20th century viewed the gospels as compilers of tradition analogous to other collections of folktales by primitive communities steeped in eschatology, but today scholars recognize the gospels as Greco-Roman biographies by conscious authors with their own theological agendas. (Note: Reddish argues expectations of Jesus's return slowed writing for future generations, though Bond notes apocalypticism was no barrier to the production of written texts, as seen by the number of Jewish apocalypses composed during the period. According to Allison and Hays, the gospels present the timing of the Parousia as imminent but not fixed, being dependent on the repentance of Israel.) Burkett argues the emergence of the gospels can be summarized by oral traditions passed on as unordered units, written collections of miracle stories and sayings, and proto-gospels preceding and serving as sources for the gospels, which combined proto-gospels, written collections, and oral tradition. The dedicatory preface of Luke testifies to the existence of previous accounts of the life of Jesus. According to Chris Keith, there is no incontrovertible evidence the gospel traditions circulated as written narratives, testimonia, or notes prior to Mark.

Mark is generally agreed to be the first gospel. Source criticism has largely fallen out of favor in recent gospels scholarship, though some elements remain. Although most scholars believe Matthew and Luke independently used Mark and a hypothesized Q source, alternative hypotheses that posit the direct use of Matthew by Luke or vice versa without Q are increasing in popularity within scholarship. (Note: The priority of Mark is accepted by most scholars, but there are important dissenting opinions: see the article Synoptic problem.) Modern scholarship emphasizes the evangelists' authorial activity over positing hypothetical sources. Honore offers a statistical classification of the number of words in the single, double, and triple traditions. The synoptic gospels adapt their sources more conservatively than other ancient historians, though the parallels and variations of the Synoptic gospels are typical of ancient historical biographies. The canonical gospels represent a Jesus tradition and were enveloped by oral storytelling and performances during the early years of Christianity, rather than being redactions or literary responses to each other. Mark, Matthew, and Luke are called the "synoptic gospels" because of their close similarities of content, arrangement, and language. Alan Kirk praises Matthew in particular for his "scribal memory competence" and "his high esteem for and careful handling of both Mark and Q", which makes claims the latter two works are significantly theologically or historically different dubious. Scholars in the 21st century increasingly favor the author of John’s knowledge and usage of the Synoptic gospels. The increase in support for or the view that the author of the Gospel of John knew the synoptic gospels is correlated with the decline of the signs source hypothesis, and there is currently considerable debate over the gospel's social, religious and historical context.

All four also use the Jewish scriptures, by quoting or referencing passages, interpreting texts, or alluding to or echoing biblical themes. Such use can be extensive: Mark's description of the Parousia (second coming) is made up almost entirely of quotations from scripture. Matthew is full of quotations and allusions, and although John uses scripture in a far less explicit manner, its influence is still pervasive. According to Wesley Allen, their source was the Greek version of the scriptures, called the Septuagint and they do not seem familiar with the original Hebrew, though other scholars point out that Matthew in particular has quotations closer to the Masoretic and could understand Hebrew. (Note: Ferda: "I have no doubt that the First Evangelist could read Hebrew, and here I stand with a host of other interpreters.")

=== Genre and historical reliability ===
Richard Burridge's comparison of the Gospels with writings from the Graeco-Roman world has led to a broad scholarly consensus that the Gospels are a subset of the genre of ancient biography (bios), changing how researchers view their literary form and historical intent. Ancient biographies were typically written shortly after the subject's death and included substantial historical material. Burridge demonstrated this through detailed comparison that the Gospels share features, such as focus on one central person, anecdotes, and accounts of deeds and death, which made them recognizable as serious life narratives to people in the first and second centuries. Ancient biographies were concerned with providing examples for readers to emulate while preserving and promoting the subject's reputation and memory; the gospels were propaganda and preaching meant to convince that Jesus was a miracle-working holy man. As such, they present the Christian message of the second half of the first century, and biblical scholars are cautious of relying on the gospels uncritically as historical documents, (Note: The Gospels are a-historical documents: Schoeps (1968, pp. 261–262): "The Gospels cannot be equated with [...] biographies [...] [Their] primary purpose was not to present a detailed historical picture of the life of Jesus. And the non-Christian materials [...] provide us with no essential new knowledge beyond the accounts of the Gospels [...] [Thus] the situation in regard to sources is highly unsatisfactory; legendary and historical accounts are hopelessly intertwined. The historian must recognize that the materials available to us do not enable us to reconstruct Jesus as he really was. [They have] only the Jesus the early disciples saw, the Christ who has survived in the beliefs of the Christian community.; Sanders (2010): "John, however, is so different that it cannot be reconciled with the Synoptics except in very general ways [...] Scholars have unanimously chosen the Synoptic Gospels' version of Jesus' teaching [...] The Synoptic Gospels, then, are the primary sources for knowledge of the historical Jesus. They are not, however, the equivalent of an academic biography of a recent historical figure. Instead, the Synoptic Gospels are theological documents that provide information the authors regarded as necessary for the religious development of the Christian communities in which they worked."; Ehrman (1999, p. 53): "... early Christians who passed along the traditions sometimes found it legitimate and necessary to change a historical fact in order to make a historical point [...] since the Gospels preserve traditions that have been modified over time in their retelling, it is impossible simply to take these stories at face value and uncritically assume that they represent historically accurate information.") (Note: As Luke's attempt to link the birth of Jesus to the census of Quirinius demonstrates, there is no guarantee that the gospels are historically accurate. (Reddish 2011, p. 22) Indeed, most critical scholars view the nativity of Jesus as a theological, rather than historical, narrative.See: W. D. Davies and E. P. Sanders, "Jesus from the Jewish point of view", in William Horbury (ed.), The Cambridge History of Judaism, vol 3: the Early Roman Period, 1984; The New Interpreter's Dictionary of the Bible: Volume 3 Abingdon Press, 2008. pp. 42, 269–70.) though they provide a good idea of the career of Jesus. (Note: Sanders (1995, p. 5): "The main sources for our knowledge about Jesus himself, the gospels in the New Testament, are, from the point of view of the historian, tainted by the fact that they were written by people who intended to glorify their hero [...] Despite this [...] we have a good idea of the external course of his life, especially his public career.") Bond states that many chreia found in the gospels are literary creations rather than reservoirs of oral tradition; while many are rooted in actual history, they have been reshaped to emphasize aspects of Jesus.

There is a scholarly consensus that the Historical Jesus was viewed as a miracle-worker during his lifetime.

Scholars since the 19th century have viewed the gospel of John as less reliable than the Synoptic gospels. Since the third quest, however, John's gospel is seen as having more reliability than previously thought or sometimes even more reliable than the synoptics. The John, Jesus, and History Seminar has contributed to the overthrow of the previous consensus that John was of no historical value, and many scholars now see it as a source for the Historical Jesus. While there are numerous variants present in Biblical manuscripts and changes by scribes, there is a "macrolevel stability", and scholars study the relations between the gospels with the view that the texts published in the late first and second centuries did not significantly differ from 21st century reconstructions. (Note: Origen complained in the 3rd century that "the differences among manuscripts have become great [...] [because copyists] either neglect to check over what they have transcribed, or, in the process of checking, they make additions or deletions as they please.") Some of these are considered significant, an example being Matthew 1:18, altered to imply the pre-existence of Jesus. For these reasons, modern scholars are cautious of relying on the gospels uncritically, and critical study can attempt to distinguish the original ideas of Jesus from those of later authors.

Scholars generally agree that John has historical value. Mark Allan Powell has observed that scholars now recognize primitive material in the Gospel of John that can contribute authentic historical information alongside the Synoptic Gospels, thereby supporting the overall reliability of the canonical Gospel accounts. John provides additional support for various facts about the Historical Jesus also found in the Synoptics, such as his association with John the Baptist, choosing of twelve disciples, conflicts with religious authorities, emphasis on love, a high self-conception, and usage of aphoristic formulations. John's claims that Jesus visited Bethany and Ephraim, had a follower named Nathaniel, and that Peter was from Bethsaida may also be historical. The narrator is presented as a witness in 1:14, and the gospel gradually identifies its narrator as the beloved disciple, notably in chapter 19. Commentators debate whether the beloved disciple is presented as the author or an authority behind the gospel. Scholars tend to reject the attribution to John the Apostle, though they view the beloved disciple as the source of much of John's content. The Synoptic Gospels are the primary sources for Christ's ministry.

Assessments of the reliability of the Gospels involve not just the texts but also the long oral and written transmission behind them, using methods such as memory studies and form criticism, with scholars reaching different conclusions. There have been different views on the transmission of material that led to the Synoptic Gospels, with various scholars arguing that memory and/or orality reliably preserved traditions ultimately traceable to the historical Jesus. Other scholars have been more skeptical and see more changes in the traditions prior to the written Gospels. Jeffrey Tripp observes a scholarly trend advocating for the reliability of memory and the oral gospel traditions.

James Dunn believed:

the earliest tradents within the Christian churches [were] preservers more than innovators [...] seeking to transmit, retell, explain, interpret, elaborate, but not create de novo [...] Through the main body of the Synoptic tradition [...] we have in most cases direct access to the teaching and ministry of Jesus as it was remembered from the beginning of the transmission process [...] and so fairly direct access to the ministry and teaching of Jesus through the eyes and ears of those who went about with him.

Anthony Le Donne, a leading memory researcher in Jesus studies, elaborated on Dunn's thesis, basing "his historiography squarely on Dunn's thesis that the historical Jesus is the memory of Jesus recalled by the earliest disciples." According to Le Donne, as explained by his reviewer, Benjamin Simpson, memories are fractured and not exact recalls of the past. Le Donne further argues that the remembrance of events is facilitated by relating them to a common story, or "type." This means the Jesus-tradition is not a theological invention of the early Church, but rather a tradition shaped and refracted through such memory "type." Le Donne too supports a conservative view on typology compared to some other scholars, transmissions involving eyewitnesses, and ultimately a stable tradition resulting in little invention in the Gospels. Le Donne expressed himself thusly vis-à-vis more skeptical scholars,

He (Dale Allison) does not read the gospels as fiction, but even if these early stories derive from memory, memory can be frail and often misleading. While I do not share Allison's point of departure (i.e. I am more optimistic), I am compelled by the method that came from it."

Dale Allison emphasizes the weakness of human memory, noting its 'many sins' and how it frequently misleads people. He expresses skepticism at other scholars' endeavors to identify authentic sayings of Jesus. Instead of isolating and authenticating individual pericopae, Allison advocates for a methodology focused on identifying patterns and finding what he calls 'recurrent attestation'. Allison argues that the general impressions left by the Gospels should be trusted, though he is more skeptical on the details; if they are broadly unreliable, then our sources almost certainly cannot have preserved any of the particulars. Opposing the preceding approaches, which treat the Gospels as historically questionable and require rigorous sifting by competent scholars for nuggets of information, Allison argues that the Gospels are generally accurate and often 'got Jesus right'. Dale Allison finds apocalypticism to be recurrently attested, among various other themes. Reviewing his work, Rafael Rodriguez largely agrees with Allison's methodology and conclusions while arguing that Allison's discussion on memory is too one-sided, noting that memory "is nevertheless sufficiently stable to authentically bring the past to bear on the present" and that people are beholden to memory's successes in everyday life.

Craig S. Keener, drawing on previous studies by Dunn, Alan Kirk, Kenneth E. Bailey, and Robert McIver, among many others, uses memory theory and oral tradition to argue that the Gospels are, in many ways, historically accurate. His work has been endorsed by Markus Bockmuehl, James H. Charlesworth, and David Aune, among others. According to Bruce Chilton and Craig A. Evans,

[T]he Judaism of the period treated such traditions very carefully, and the New Testament writers in numerous passages applied to apostolic traditions the same technical terminology found elsewhere in Judaism [...] In this way they both identified their traditions as 'holy word' and showed their concern for a careful and ordered transmission of it."

N. T. Wright also argued for a stable oral tradition:

Communities that live in an oral culture tend to be story-telling communities [...] Such stories [...] acquire a fairly fixed form, down to precise phraseology [...] they retain that form, and phraseology, as long as they are told [...] The storyteller in such a culture has no license to invent or adapt at will. The less important the story, the more the entire community, in a process that is informal but very effective, will keep a close watch on the precise form and wording with which the story is told.

Other scholars are less sanguine about oral tradition, and Valantasis, Bleyle, and Hough argue that the early traditions were fluid and subject to alteration, sometimes transmitted by those who had known Jesus personally, but more often by wandering prophets and teachers like the Paul the Apostle, who did not know him personally. Ehrman explains how the tradition developed as it was transmitted:

You are probably familiar with the old birthday party game "telephone." A group of kids sits in a circle, the first tells a brief story to the one sitting next to her, who tells it to the next, and to the next, and so on, until it comes back full circle to the one who started it. Invariably, the story has changed so much in the process of retelling that everyone gets a good laugh. Imagine this same activity taking place, not in a solitary living room with ten kids on one afternoon, but over the expanse of the Roman Empire (some 2,500 miles across), with thousands of participants—from different backgrounds, with different concerns, and in different contexts—some of whom have to translate the stories into different languages.

While multiple quests have been undertaken to reconstruct the historical Jesus, since the late 1990s, concerns have been growing about the possibility of reconstructing a historical Jesus from the Gospel texts. According to Dunn,

What we actually have in the earliest retellings of what is now the Synoptic tradition...are the memories of the first disciples-not Jesus himself, but the remembered Jesus. The idea that we can get back to an objective historical reality, which we can wholly separate and disentangle from the disciples' memories...is simply unrealistic."

These memories can contradict one another and are not always historically accurate, as the Gospels show. Chris Keith argues that the Historical Jesus was the one who could create these memories, both true or not. For instance, Mark and Luke disagree on how Jesus came back to the synagogue, with the likely more accurate Mark arguing he was rejected for being an artisan, while Luke portrays Jesus as literate and his refusal to heal in Nazareth as the cause of his dismissal. Keith does not view Luke's account as a fabrication since different eyewitnesses would have perceived and remembered differently. According to Chris Keith, a historical Jesus is "ultimately unattainable, but can be hypothesized on the basis of the interpretations of the early Christians, and as part of a larger process of accounting for how and why early Christians came to view Jesus in the ways that they did." According to Keith, "these two models are methodologically and epistemologically incompatible," calling into question the methods and aim of the first model. Keith argues that criticism of the criteria of authenticity does not mean scholars cannot research the Historical Jesus, but rather that scholarship should seek to understand the Gospels rather than trying to sift through them for nuggets of history. Regardless of the methodological challenges historical Jesus studies have flourished in recent years; Dale Allison laments, "The publication of academic books about the historical Jesus continues apace, so much so that no one can any longer keep up; we are all overwhelmed."

Robert H. Stein has written that the correct approach to Gospel traditions is to treat them as reliable until proven otherwise, because multiple lines of evidence (such as eyewitness presence, careful community transmission, and the preservation of difficult sayings) support their overall authenticity.

=== Textual history and canonisation ===
The oldest known gospel text is 𝔓^{52}, a fragment of John dating to the first half of the second century. The creation of a Christian canon was probably a response to the career of the heretic Marcion of Sinope (c. 85–160), who established a canon of his own with just one gospel, the Gospel of Marcion, similar to the Gospel of Luke. The Muratorian fragment, the earliest surviving list of books considered (by its own author at least) to form Christian scripture, included Matthew, Mark, Luke, and John.

Irenaeus went further, stating that there must be four gospels and only four because there were four corners of the world and thus the Church should have four pillars. He referred to the four collectively as the "fourfold gospel" (euangelion tetramorphon).

== Non-canonical (apocryphal) gospels ==
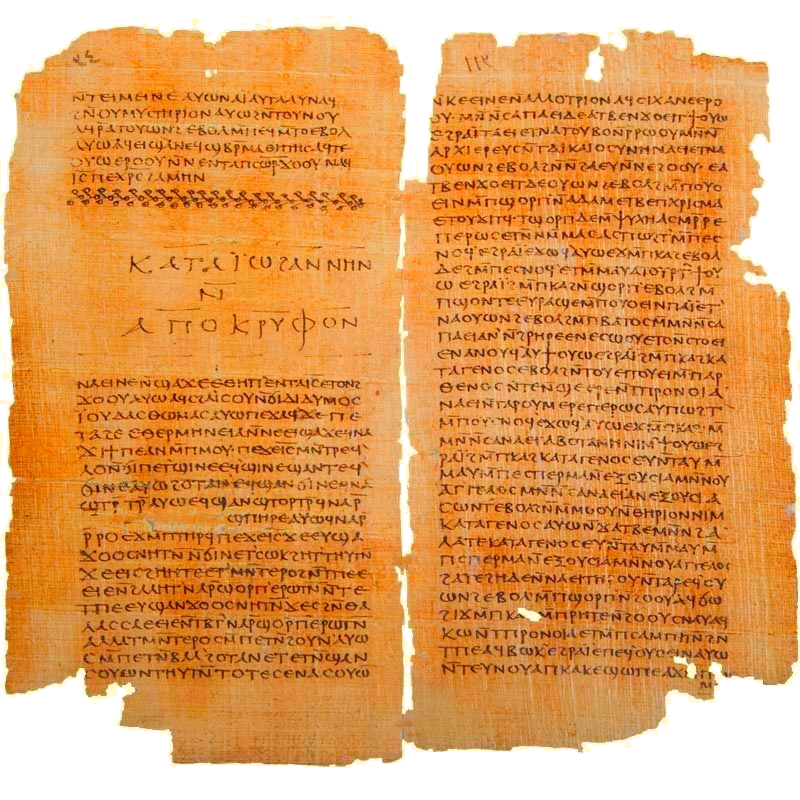
The Gospel of Thomas

The many apocryphal gospels arose from the first century onward, frequently under assumed names to enhance their credibility and authority, and often from within branches of Christianity that were eventually branded heretical. They can be broadly organised into the following categories:

- Infancy gospels: arose in the second century, including the Gospel of James, also called the Protoevangelium, which was the first to introduce the concept of the perpetual virginity of Mary, and the Infancy Gospel of Thomas (not to be confused with the unrelated Coptic Gospel of Thomas), both of which related many miraculous incidents from the life of Mary and the childhood of Jesus that are not included in the canonical gospels.
- Ministry gospels
- 'Sayings gospels' and agrapha
- Passion, resurrection and post-resurrection gospels
- Gospel harmonies: in which the four canonical gospels are combined into a single narrative, either to present a consistent text or to produce a more accessible account of Jesus' life.

The apocryphal gospels can also be seen in terms of the communities which produced them:

- The Jewish Christian gospels are the products of Christians who had not given up a Jewish identity: they regarded Jesus as the messiah of scripture, but did not agree that he was God, an idea which, although central to Christianity as it eventually developed, is contrary to Jewish belief.
- Gnostic gospels uphold the idea that the universe is the product of a hierarchy of gods, of whom the Jewish god is a rather low-ranking member. Gnosticism holds that Jesus was entirely "spirit", and that his earthly life and death were therefore only an appearance, not a reality. Many Gnostic texts deal not in concepts of sin and repentance, but with illusion and divine illumination.

The major apocryphal gospels (after Bart Ehrman, "Lost Christianities" – comments on content are by Ehrman unless otherwise noted)
Title	Probable date	Content
Epistula Apostolorum	Mid 2nd c.	Anti-gnostic dialogue between Jesus and the disciples after the resurrection, emphasising the reality of the flesh and of Jesus' fleshly resurrection
Gospel of the Hebrews	Early 2nd c.	Events in the life of Jesus; Jewish-Christian, with possible gnostic overtones
Gospel of the Ebionites	Early 2nd c.	Jewish-Christian, embodying anti-sacrificial concerns
Gospel of the Egyptians	Early 2nd c.	"Salome" figures prominently; Jewish-Christian stressing asceticism
Gospel of Mary	2nd c.	Dialogue of Mary Magdalene with the apostles, and her vision of Jesus' secret teachings. It was originally written in Greek and is often interpreted as a Gnostic text. It is typically not considered a gospel by scholars since it does not focus on the life of Jesus.
Gospel of the Nazareans	Early 2nd c.	Aramaic version of Matthew, possibly lacking the first two chapters; Jewish-Christian
Gospel of Nicodemus	5th c.	Jesus' trial, crucifixion and descent into Hell
Gospel of Peter	Early 2nd c.	Fragmentary narrative of Jesus' trial, death and emergence from the tomb. It seems to be hostile toward Jews and includes docetic elements. It is a narrative gospel and is notable for asserting that Herod, not Pontius Pilate, ordered the crucifixion of Jesus. It had been lost but was rediscovered in the 19th century.
Gospel of Philip	3rd c.	Mystical reflections of the disciple Philip
Gospel of the Saviour	Late 2nd c.	Fragmentary account of Jesus' last hours
Coptic Gospel of Thomas	Early 2nd c.	The Oxford Dictionary of the Christian Church says that the original may date from c. 150. Some scholars believe that it may represent a tradition independent from the canonical gospels, but that developed over a long time and was influenced by Matthew and Luke; other scholars believe it is a later text, dependent from the canonical gospels. While it can be understood in Gnostic terms, it lacks the characteristic features of Gnostic doctrine. It includes two unique parables, the parable of the empty jar and the parable of the assassin. It had been lost but was discovered, in a Coptic version dating from c. 350, at Nag Hammadi in 1945–46, and three papyri, dated to c. 200, which contain fragments of a Greek text similar to but not identical with that in the Coptic language, have also been found.
Infancy Gospel of Thomas	Early 2nd c.	Miraculous deeds of Jesus between the ages of five and twelve
Gospel of Truth	Mid 2nd c.	Joys of Salvation
Egerton Gospel (𝔓^{2})	Early 2nd c.	Fragmentary, four episodes from the life of Jesus
Diatessaron	Late 2nd c.	Gospel harmony (and the first such gospel harmony) composed by Tatian; may have been intended to replace the separate gospels as an authoritative text. It was accepted for liturgical purposes for up to two centuries in Roman Syria, but was eventually suppressed.
Gospel of James	Mid 2nd c.	Birth and early life of Mary, and birth of Jesus
Gospel of Marcion	Mid 2nd c.	Marcion of Sinope, c. 150, had a much shorter version of the gospel of Luke, differing substantially from what has now become the standard text of the gospel and far less oriented towards the Jewish scriptures. Marcion's critics said that he had edited out the portions of Luke he did not like, though Marcion argued that his was the more genuinely original text. He is said to have rejected all other gospels, including those of Matthew, Mark and especially John.
Secret Gospel of Mark	Uncertain	Allegedly a longer version of Mark written for an elect audience
Gospel of Judas	Late 2nd c.	Purports to tell the story of the gospel from the perspective of Judas, the disciple who is usually said to have betrayed Jesus. It paints an unusual picture of the relationship between Jesus and Judas, in that it appears to interpret Judas's act not as betrayal but as obedience to Jesus's instructions. The text was recovered from a cave in Egypt by a thief and was subsequently sold on the black market until it was finally discovered by a collector, who, with the help of academics from Yale and Princeton, verified its authenticity. The document itself does not claim to have been authored by Judas (it is, rather, a gospel about Judas), and is known to date to at least 180.
Gospel of Barnabas	14th–16th c.	Contradicts the ministry of Jesus in the canonical New Testament and strongly denies Pauline doctrine, but has clear parallels with Islam, mentioning Muhammad as Messenger of God. Jesus identifies himself as a prophet, not the son of God.

Paul N. Anderson has shown that the four canonical Gospels draw on independent historical traditions rooted in eyewitness memories, in contrast to later non-canonical writings, making the canonical accounts especially valuable for the historical study of Jesus.

== In Islam ==
In Islam, the Injil (Arabic: الإنجيل) is considered one of the four major divine scriptures revealed by God, alongside the Tawrat (Torah), Zabur (Psalms), and the Quran. The term Injīl is derived from the Syriac ܐܘܢܓܠܝܘܢ (awongelion), ultimately from the Greek εὐαγγέλιον (euangelion; lit. good news or glad tidings).

According to the Quran, the Injil was a divine revelation given to ʿĪsā (Jesus), whom Islam regards as a prophet and messenger, not the Son of God. Although al-injil is customarily translated as 'the gospel', Nicolai Sinai proposes the Quranic Injil is more likely a reference to the unitary Christian scriptural canon, that is believed by the Qu'ran to have been given to Isa, and was seen as a divinely mandated re-edition of the Torah and available in the Quran's own time. It is described as containing guidance and light for the Children of Israel and as confirming the scriptures that came before it.

Although both the Qur'an and its earliest interpreters assume that the Biblical text is broadly authentic, teachings about its corruption appeared later in history. Subsequent Islamic belief has since held that the original Injil has been altered (taḥrīf) and that the canonical Gospels do not represent this original text, although they may contain elements of Jesus's authentic teachings. Some classical and contemporary scholars argue that the Injil was primarily an oral revelation given to Jesus, similar to the Qur'an revealed to Muhammad, rather than a written text authored by him.

=== Criticism ===
The Islamic view of the Injil has been criticized as historically and textually problematic, arguing that there is no manuscript evidence for a distinct, lost Gospel that matches the Qur'anic description. Others contend that the charge of tahrif ('[Biblical] corruption') is a later theological development rather than a contemporaneous claim from the time of Jesus.

According to Professor Ilka Lindstedt of the University of Helsinki, nowhere is the corruption of the Jewish or Christian scriptures stated in the Qu'ran, but only its misinterpretation. Mehdy Shaddel writes that the Qur'an is 'decidedly non-supercessionist. In none of the proclamations addressed to Jews and Christians in the text does it assert that their belief systems, scriptures, or way of life are misguided or have been abrogated.'; the Quran confirms what the Jews and Christians already possess (Q 2:89), and it confirms the continued relevance of the Torah and Gospel held by Jews and Christians of the time as a binding source of law. Abdullah Saeed writes :

Even if there is textual corruption associated with interpretation, the actual scriptures can still be relied upon and considered "Books of God." For the Qur'än, the concept of the "Book of God" was appropriately used to the scriptures of Jews and Christians even though these may not be from the Muslim point of view "exactly as they were" during the time of Moses or Jesus and are, in some cases, translated from the original languages to other languages or narrated by a person other than the Prophet who received the revelation. Since the "authorized" scriptures of Jews and Christians remain very much today as they existed at the time of the Prophet, it is difficult to argue that the Qur'anic references to Tawrat and Injil were only to the "pure" Tawrat and Injil as existed at the time of Moses and Jesus, respectively. If the texts have remained more or less as they were in the seventh century CE, the reverence the Qur'än has shown them at the time should be retained even today.

Muslim scholars generally defend by responding that the Qur'an does not require the original Injil to survive in full form, only that its essential message was revealed to Jesus and has since been superseded by the Qur'an.

== See also ==
- Agrapha
- Apocalyptic literature
- Catena (biblical commentary)
- The Aquarian Gospel of Jesus the Christ
- Authorship of the Bible
- Dishna Papers
- Dating the Bible
- Fifth gospel (genre)
- The gospel
- Gospel (liturgy)
- L'Évangile du serpent
- Gospel harmony
- Gospel in Islam
- Gospel of Marcion
- Jesuism
- Jewish–Christian gospels

== Sources ==
- Alexander, Loveday (2006). "What is a Gospel?". In Barton, Stephen C. (ed.). The Cambridge Companion to the Gospels. Cambridge University Press. ISBN 9780521807661.
- Allen, O. Wesley (2013). Reading the Synoptic Gospels. Chalice Press. ISBN 978-0827232273.
- Anderson, Paul N. (2011). The Riddles of the Fourth Gospel: An Introduction to John. Fortress Press. ISBN 978-1451415551.
- Aune, David E. (1987). The New Testament in its literary environment. Westminster John Knox Press. ISBN 978-0-664-25018-8.
- Aune, David E. (2003). The Westminster Dictionary of New Testament and Early Christian Literature and Rhetoric. Westminster John Knox Press. ISBN 978-0-664-25018-8.
- Beaton, Richard C. (2005). "How Matthew Writes". In Bockmuehl, Markus; Hagner, Donald A. (eds.). The Written Gospel. Oxford University Press. ISBN 978-0-521-83285-4.
- Bernhard, Andrew E. (2006). Other Early Christian Gospels: A Critical Edition of the Surviving Greek Manuscripts. Library of New Testament Studies. Vol. 315. London; New York: T & T Clark. ISBN 0-567-04204-9.
- Boring, M. Eugene (2006). Mark: A Commentary. Presbyterian Publishing Corp. ISBN 978-0-664-22107-2.
- Burge, Gary M. (2014). "Gospel of John". In Evans, Craig A. (ed.). Routledge Encyclopedia of the Historical Jesus. Routledge. ISBN 978-1317722243.
- Burkett, Delbert (2002). An introduction to the New Testament and the origins of Christianity. Cambridge University Press. ISBN 978-0-521-00720-7.
- Bynum, Wm. Randolph (2012). The Fourth Gospel and the Scriptures: Illuminating the Form and Meaning of Scriptural Citation in John 19:37. Brill. ISBN 978-90-04-22843-6.
- Casey, Maurice (2010). Jesus of Nazareth: An Independent Historian's Account of His Life and Teaching. T&T Clark. ISBN 978-0-567-64517-3.
- Cross, Frank Leslie; Livingstone, Elizabeth A. (2005). The Oxford Dictionary of the Christian Church. Oxford University Press. ISBN 978-0192802903.
- Culpepper, R. Alan (1999). "The Christology of the Johannine Writings". In Kingsbury, Jack Dean; Powell, Mark Allan Powell; Bauer, David R. (eds.). Who Do You Say that I Am?: Essays on Christology. Westminster John Knox Press. ISBN 9780664257521.
- Dunn, James D.G. (1995). "Messianic Ideas and Their Influence on the Jesus of History". In Charlesworth, James H. (ed.). The Messiah.
- Dunn, James D.G (2003). Christianity in the making Volume 1. Jesus Remembered. William B. Eerdmans.
- Dunn, James D.G. (2005). "The Tradition". In Dunn, James D.G.; McKnight, Scot (eds.). The Historical Jesus in Recent Research. Eisenbrauns. ISBN 978-1575061009.
- Edwards, James R. (2002). The Gospel according to Mark. Wm. B. Eerdmans Publishing. ISBN 978-0851117782.
- Ehrman, Bart D. (1996). The Orthodox Corruption of Scripture: The Effect of Early Christological Controversies on the Text of the New Testament. Oxford University Press. ISBN 978-0-19-976357-3.
- Ehrman, Bart D. (1997). The New Testament. A Historical Introduction to the Early Christian Writings. Oxford University Press.
- Ehrman, Bart D. (1999). Jesus: Apocalyptic Prophet of the New Millennium. Oxford University Press. ISBN 978-0199839438.
- Ehrman, Bart D. (2005a). Misquoting Jesus. Harper Collins.
- Ehrman, Bart D. (2005b). Lost Christianities. Oxford University Press. ISBN 978-0195182491.
- Ehrman, Bart (2006). The Lost Gospel of Judas Iscariot. Oxford University Press. ISBN 9780199831289.
- Ehrman, Bart; Plese, Zlatko (2011). The Apocryphal Gospels: Texts and Translations. Oxford University Press. ISBN 9780199831289.
- Eve, Eric (2021). Solving the Synoptic Puzzle: Introducing the Case for the Farrer Hypothesis. Wipf and Stock. ISBN 9781725283886.
- Fant, Clyde E.; Reddish, Mitchell E. (2008). Lost Treasures of the Bible. Eerdmans. ISBN 9780802828811.
- Funk, Robert W.; Hoover, Roy W.; Jesus Seminar (1993). "The Gospel of Thomas". The five gospels. HarperSanFrancisco. pp. 471–532.
- Gamble, Harry (1985). The New Testament Canon: Its Making and Meaning. Fortress Press. ISBN 978-0-8006-0470-7.
- Goodacre, Mark (2001). The Synoptic Problem: A Way Through the Maze. A&C Black. ISBN 978-0567080561.
- Honoré, A.M. (1986). "A statistical study of the synoptic problem". Novum Testamentum. 10 (2/3): 95–147. doi:10.2307/1560364. JSTOR 1560364.
- Johnson, Luke Timothy (2010a). The Writings of the New Testament – An Interpretation (3rd ed.). Fortress Press. ISBN 978-1451413281.
- Keith, Chris (2012). "The Indebtedness of the criteria Approach to Form Criticism and Recent Attempts to Rehabilitate the Search for an Authentic Jesus", in Jesus, Criteria, and the Demise of Authenticity. T&T Clark. pp. 25–48 at 39–40. ISBN 978-0567377234.
- Keith, Chris (2016). "The Narratives of the Gospels and the Historical Jesus: Current Debates, Prior Debates and the Goal of Historical Jesus Research". Journal for the Study of the New Testament. 38 (4): 426–455. doi:10.1177/0142064X16637777.
- Keith, Chris; Le Donne, Anthony, eds. (2012). Jesus, Criteria, and the Demise of Authenticity. T&T Clark. ISBN 9780567691200.
- Levine, Amy-Jill (2009). "Introduction". In Levine, Amy-Jill; Allison, Dale C. Jr.; Crossan, John Dominic (eds.). The Historical Jesus in Context. Princeton University Press. ISBN 978-1400827374.
- Lieu, Judith (2005). "How John Writes". In Bockmuehl, Markus; Hagner, Donald A. (eds.). The Written Gospel. Oxford University Press. ISBN 978-0-521-83285-4.
- Lincoln, Andrew (2004). "Reading John". In Porter, Stanley E. (ed.). Reading the Gospels Today. Eerdmans. ISBN 978-0802805171.
- Lincoln, Andrew (2005). Gospel According to St John. Bloomsbury Publishing. ISBN 978-1441188229.
- Lindars, Barnabas; Edwards, Ruth; Court, John M. (2000). The Johannine Literature. A&C Black. ISBN 978-1-84127-081-4.
- Martens, Allan (2004). "Salvation Today: Reading Luke's Message for a Gentile Audience". In Porter, Stanley E. (ed.). Reading the Gospels Today. Eerdmans. ISBN 978-0802805171.
- Meier, John P. (1991). A Marginal Jew. Volume 1: The roots of the problem and the person. Doubleday. ISBN 978-0-385-26425-9.
- Metzger, Bruce (2003). The New Testament: Its Background, Growth, and Content. Abingdon. ISBN 978-068-705-2639.
- Morris, Leon (1986). New Testament Theology. Zondervan. ISBN 978-0-310-45571-4.
- Nolland, John (2005). The Gospel of Matthew: A Commentary on the Greek Text. Eerdmans.
- Pagels, Elaine (1989). The Gnostic Gospels (PDF). Random House.
- Parker, D.C. (1997). The Living Text of the Gospels. Cambridge University Press. ISBN 978-0521599511.
- Perkins, Pheme (1998). "The Synoptic Gospels and the Acts of the Apostles: Telling the Christian Story". In Barton, John (ed.). The Cambridge companion to biblical interpretation. Westminster John Knox Press. ISBN 978-0-521-48593-7.
- Perkins, Pheme (2012). Reading the New Testament: An Introduction. Paulist Press. ISBN 978-0809147861.
- Petersen, William L. (2010). "The Diatessaron and the Fourfold Gospel". In Horton, Charles (ed.). The Earliest Gospels. Bloomsbury. ISBN 9780567000972.
- Porter, Stanley E. (2006). "Language and Translation of the New Testament". In Rogerson, J.W.; Lieu, Judith M. (eds.). The Oxford Handbook of Biblical Studies. Oxford University Press. ISBN 978-0199254255.
- Reddish, Mitchell (2011). An Introduction to The Gospels. Abingdon Press. ISBN 978-1426750083.
- Sanders, E. P. (1995). The Historical Figure of Jesus. Penguin. ISBN 9780141928227.
- Sanders, E. P. (1995b). The Historical Figure of Jesus. Penguin. ISBN 978-0140144994.
- Sanders, E. P. (2010). "Jesus Christ". Encyclopædia Britannica. Archived from the original on 3 May 2015.
- Schoeps, Hans-Joachim (1968) [1961]. The Religions of Mankind. Translated by Winston, Richard; Winston, Clara. Garden City, NY: Anchor Books. ISBN 978-0-385-04080-8.
- Scholz, Daniel J. (2009). Jesus in the Gospels and Acts: Introducing the New Testament. Saint Mary's Press. ISBN 9780884899556.
- Telford, W.R. (1999). The Theology of the Gospel of Mark. Cambridge University Press. ISBN 978-0521439770.
- Theissen, Gerd; Merz, Annette (1998) [1996]. The Historical Jesus: A Comprehensive Guide. Fortress Press. ISBN 978-1-4514-0863-8.
- Thompson, Marianne (2006). "Gospel of John". In Barton, Stephen C. (ed.). The Cambridge Companion to the Gospels. Cambridge University Press. ISBN 9780521807661.
- Tuckett, Christopher (2000). "Gospel, Gospels". In Freedman, David Noel; Myers, Allen C. (eds.). Eerdmans Dictionary of the Bible. Eerdmans. ISBN 978-9053565032.
- Valantasis, Richard; Bleyle, Douglas K.; Haugh, Dennis C. (2009). The Gospels and Christian Life in History and Practice. Rowman & Littlefield. ISBN 978-0-7425-7069-6.
- Vermes, Geza (2013) [2012]. Christian Beginnings. Penguin.
- Watson, Francis (2016). The Fourfold Gospel: A Theological Reading of the New Testament Portraits of Jesus. Baker Academic. ISBN 9780801095450.
- Wiegers, G. (1995). "Muhammad as the Messiah: A comparison of the polemical works of Juan Alonso with the Gospel of Barnabas". Biblitheca Orientalis: 245–291.
- Woodhead, Linda (2004). Christianity: A Very Short Introduction. Oxford University Press. ISBN 978-0199687749.
