= Hamid al-Din al-Kirmani =

11th century Persian Isma'ili scholar

- Title: Chief (ḥujja) of the Two Iraqs (Arab Iraq and Persian Iraq), "Hujjat al-'Iraqayn"

Personal life
- Born: Kerman Province, Iran
- Era: Fatimid period; During Imam al-Hakim's Period
- Main interests: Islamic theology; philosophy; Neoplatonism; Metaphysics
- Notable works: Rahat al-'aql; Kitab al-riyad; Majmūʿa-yi rasāʾil-i al-Kirmānī; Al-Maṣābīḥ fī Ithbāt al-Imāma; Al-Aqwal al-dhahabiya; Al-Majālis al-Baṣriyyah; Al-Majālis al-Baghdādiyyah
- Occupation: Theologian; Philosopher; Missionary; Writer

Religious life
- Religion: Isma'ilism Shia Islam

Hamid al-Din Abu'l-Hasan Ahmad ibn Abdallah al-Kirmani (Arabic: حميد الدين الكرماني; fl. 996–1021 CE) was an Isma'ili scholar. He was of Persian origin and was probably born in the province of Kirman. He seems to have spent the greater part of his life as a Fatimid da'i (missionary) in Baghdad and Basra. He was a theologian and philosopher who rose to prominence during the Fatimid caliph-imam al-Hakim bi Amr Allah.

A prominent Ismaili da'i or missionary, he was considered by the central headquarters of the Fatimid da'wa in Cairo as one of the most learned Ismaili theologians and philosophers of the Fatimid period. It was in that capacity that al-Kirmani played an important role in refuting the extremist ideas of some of the dissident da'is, who by proclaiming al-Hakim's divinity had initiated the Druze movement. Al-Kirmani was summoned in 1014 or shortly earlier to Cairo where he produced several works to disclaim these extremist doctrines. Al-Kirmani's writings, which were widely circulated, were to some extent successful in checking the spread of the extremist doctrines.

== Works ==
Of his corpus of nearly thirty works, only eighteen seem to have survived. His major philosophical treatise, the Rahat al-Aql (Peace of Mind), was finished in 1020. In this work, Al-Kirmani intended to provide the reader an opportunity to understand how to obtain the eternal life of the mind, the paradise of reason, in a constantly changing world.

Some of his prominent works are:

- Rahat al-'Aql (Peace of Mind, or Comfort of Reason), completed in 1020 and considered his magnum opus.
- Al-Aqwal al-Dhahabiya, refuting al-Razi's argument against the necessity of revelation.
- Kitab al-Riyad, a book that propounds the early Isma'ili cosmology.
- Kitab al-Masabih, an Islamic treatise on the necessity of immamate.

== Sources ==
- Daftary, Farhad (2001). "Intellectual Life among the Ismailis: An Overview". In Daftary, Farhad (ed.). Intellectual Traditions in Islam. I.B.Tauris. pp. 87–111.
- Daftary, Farhad (2003). "Ḥamid-al-din Kermani". In Yarshater, Ehsan (ed.). Encyclopædia Iranica. Vol. XI: Giōni–Harem I. London and New York: Routledge & Kegan Paul. pp. 639–641. ISBN 978-0-933273-71-9.
