= Psalms in Islam =

Holy book of the prophet Dawud

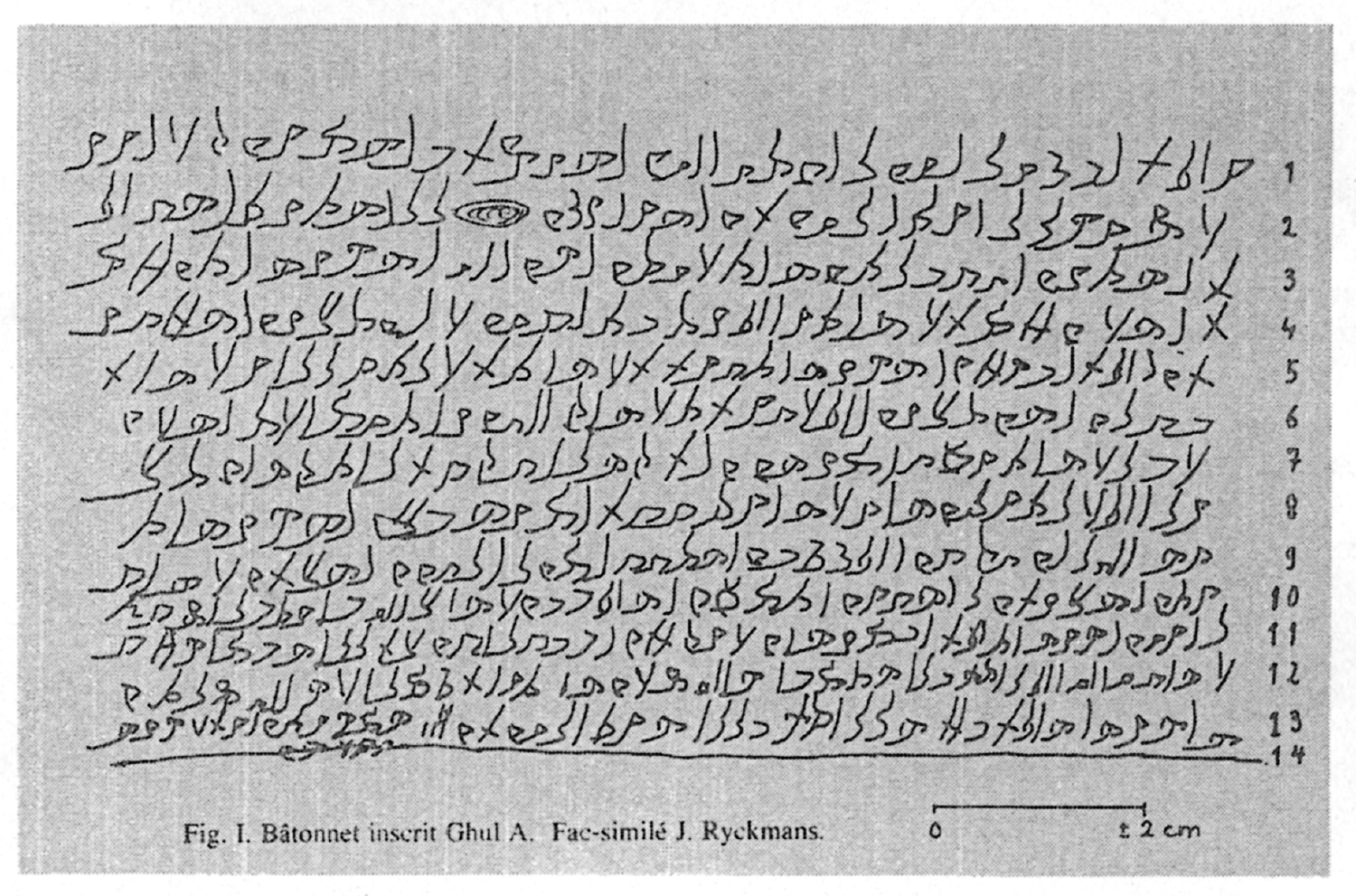
South Arabian Mazmuur inscription

Zabur (Arabic: ٱلزَّبُورِ, romanized: az-zabūr) is, according to Islam, the holy book of David, one of the holy books revealed by Allah before the Quran, alongside others such as the Tawrāh (Torah) and the Injīl (Gospel). Muslim tradition maintains that the Zabur mentioned in the Quran is the Psalms of Dawud (David in Islam).

The Christian monks and ascetics of pre-Islamic Arabia may be associated in pre-Islamic Arabic poetry with texts called mazmour, which in other contexts may refer to palm leaf documents. This has been interpreted by some as referring to psalters.

Among many Christians in the Middle East and in South Asia, the word mazmour (Hindustani مزمور (Nastaʿlīq), मज़्मूर (Devanagari)) is used for the Psalms of David in the Hebrew Bible. The Hebrew term is mizmor מזמור.

== Etymology ==
The Arabic word zabūr means "book", "inscription", or "writing." In early sources it may refer to Ancient South Arabian writing on palm leaves.

Much of Western scholarship sees the word zabūr in the sense "psalter" as being a conflation of Arabic zabūr, "writing", with the Hebrew word for "psalm", mizmōr (Hebrew: מִזְמוֹר) or its Aramaic equivalent mazmūrā (Syriac: ܡܙܡܘܪܐ).

An alternate, less accepted origin for the title zabūr in this sense is that it is a corruption of the Hebrew zimrah (Hebrew: זִמְרָה) meaning "song, music" or sippūr (Hebrew: סִפּוּר), meaning "story."

== Mention in the Quran ==
In the Qur'an, the Zabur is mentioned by name three times. The Qur'an itself says nothing about the Zabur specifically, except that it was revealed to Dawud and that in the Zabur is written "My servants the righteous, shall inherit the earth".

Indeed, We have revealed to you, [O Muhammad], as We revealed to Noah and the prophets after him. And we revealed to Abraham, Ishmael, Isaac, Jacob, the Descendants, Jesus, Job, Jonah, Aaron, and Solomon, and to David We gave the book [of Psalms].

— Qur'an 4:163, Sahih International Translation

And your Lord is most knowing of whoever is in the heavens and the earth. And We have made some of the prophets exceed others [in various ways], and to David We gave the book [of Psalms].

— Qur'an 17:55, Sahih International Translation

And We have already written in the book [of Psalms] after the [previous] mention that the land [of Paradise] is inherited by My righteous servants.

— Qur'an 21:105, Sahih International Translation

== Connection to the Psalms ==
In the Quran and Urdu translation of the Bible, the Zabur refers to the Psalms. The Quran 21:105 says that in the Zabur there is a quote "the land is inherited by my righteous servants". This resembles the 29th verse of Psalm 37, which says "[t]he righteous shall inherit the land, and abide forever in it."

Ahrens supports the view that al-Anbiya 105 is quoting from the Psalms (1930). He says that the verse in the Qur'an reads, "We have written in the Zabur after the reminder that My righteous servants shall inherit the earth." His conclusion is that this verse represents a close and rare linguistic parallel with the Hebrew Bible and, more pointedly, with Psalm 37 ascribed specifically to David (see wording in verses 9,11,29).

== In Hadith ==
One hadith, considered valid by Muhammad al-Bukhari, says:

Narrated Abu Huraira: The Prophet said, "The reciting of the Zabur (i.e. Psalms) was made easy for David. He used to order that his riding animals be saddled, and would finish reciting the Zabur before they were saddled. And he would never eat except from the earnings of his manual work."

— Sahih al-Bukhari, 4:55:628

== Ketuvim ==
Christian apologist Karl Gottlieb Pfander suggested that the Qur'an's reference to Zabur actually refers to the third division of the Hebrew Scriptures, known as the Writings or Ketuvim, a broader grouping of Jewish holy books encompassing the Psalms and other collections of Hebrew literature and poetry.

== See also ==
- Scrolls of Abraham
- Sabians
- Sheba
- Book of Psalms
