= Ibrahim ibn Umar al-Biqa'i =

Muslim exegete (1406–1480)

Personal life
- Born: 809 AH, (1406 CE) Khirbet Rouha, Damascus Sanjak
- Died: 885 AH, (1480 CE) Baghdad, Iraq
- Main interest(s): Tafsir, Sufism

Religious life
- Religion: Islam
- School: Shafi'i
- Creed: Ash'ari

Muslim leader
- Influenced by: Ibn Hajar al-Asqalani
- Influenced: Sayf al-Din Jaqmaq

Burhan al-Din Ibrahim ibn 'Umar al-Biqa'i (Arabic: برهان الدين إبراهيم بن عمر البقاعي) (d. 1480) was a 15th-century Muslim commentator, polemicist, historian, and Muslim Hebraist. He was an exegete as well as a prominent critic of the Andalusian philosopher, Ibn Arabi. He is remembered most for his approach to Tafsir (exegesis) involving quoting from biblical sources such as the Hebrew Bible.

== Life ==
Ibrahim ibn Umar al-Biqa'i was born in 1406 in the Beqaa as stated in his epithet al-Biqa'i (from Beqaa). He moved to Damascus and Cairo for his studies. Since Damascus was occupied by the Crusaders at that time, al-Biqa'i was among the scholars who participated in jihad against them. In Cairo, he was a student of Ibn Hajar al-Asqalani. Through Ibn Hajar's recommendation, the ruling Burji Mamluk sultan, Sayf al-Din Jaqmaq accepted al-Biqa'i as a personal tutor. He was also promoted to a role as a teacher at the Mosque of al-Zahir Baybars in Cairo.

During his time in Cairo, he faced harsh criticism from contemporary scholars for his approach to Quranic exegesis.

He died in 1480 and was buried in the cemetery at Bab al-Saghir.

== Views ==
=== Ibn Arabi ===
He was very critical of Ibn Arabi and his ideas. He wrote a treatise titled Tanbih al-Ghabi ila Takfir Ibn 'Arabi (The Warning To An Ignorant Regarding Ibn Arabi's Apostasy). The book listed several of Ibn Arabi's sayings which he considered as blasphemous. He also quoted evidences from other scholars contemporary to and before him, like Zain al-Din al-'Iraqi, to support his evidence that Ibn Arabi was a disbeliever.

The contemporary Muslim scholar, Jalal al-Din al-Suyuti wrote a booklet, Tanbih al-Ghabi bi-Tabri'at Ibn 'Arabi as a refutation of the book and a defence of Ibn Arabi in general.

=== Quranic exegesis ===
In his tafsir (commentary of the Qur'an) titled Nazm al-Durar fi Tanasub al-Ayat wa-al-Suwar (Arabic: نـظـم الـدرر في تـنـاسـب الآيـات و الـسـور), he drew extensively on the Hebrew Bible and the New Testament as sources to elucidate certain Qur'anic verses. Intellectual figures who impacted al-Biqa'i's work included al-Haralli and al-Asbahani. This hermeneutical decision met with great resistance and criticism from al-Sakhawi, one of Cairo's leading scholars, who wrote a scathing response in support of the traditional legal prohibition against the religious use of the Bible, a text believed to have existed only in corrupt form. Aside from this, al-Biqa'i favoured the use of rhetorical and logical coherence as the primary tool for interpretation of the Qur'an.

== Works ==
- Nazm al-Durar fi Tanasub al-Ayat wa-al-Suwar: His commentary on the Qur'an, which displays Ash'arite influence.
- Tanbih al-Ghabi ila Takfir Ibn 'Arabi (A Warning to the Fool Regarding the Heresy of Ibn 'Arabi): A criticism of Ibn Arabi and Ibn al-Farid. This work was heavily criticized by the polymath Jalal al-Din al-Suyuti, who wrote a refutation booklet titled Tanbih al-Ghabi bi-Tabri'at Ibn 'Arabi.
- Al-Nukat wa al-Fawa'id 'ala Sharh al-'Aqa'id (Gems and Annotations on the Explanation of Islamic Beliefs), commentary on al-Taftazani’s commentary on al-'Aqa'id al-Nasafiyya. This work demonstrates his profound grasp of kalām (speculative theology).

== See also ==
- List of Ash'aris
