= Torah in Islam =

Islamic views of the Torah

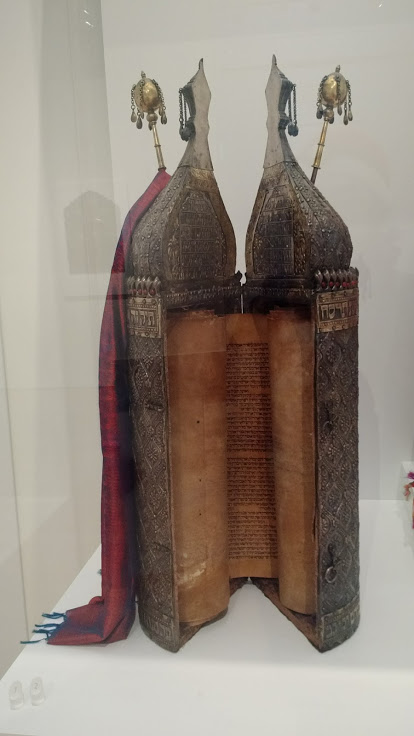
A Torah scroll in an opened case at the North Carolina Museum of Art, 2019

In Islam, the Torah, or Tawrat, (Arabic: التَّوْرَاة, romanized: at-tawrāh, [tæwˈrɑː]) is recognized as a sacred scripture bestowed by God upon Musa on Mount Sinai to govern and guide the Children of Israel. It is seen as a revelatory text as it is for other prophets in Islam. The Tawrat is considered an essential article of faith in Islam.

== Etymology and context ==
The Arabic term Tawrah (Tawrāh) is akin to the Hebrew Torah, meaning "instruction," "teaching,", or "law."

Academic analysis of Islamic literature places the term Tawrat in three distinct contexts:

1. Divine scripture revealed specifically to Moses.
2. Broader canonical scripture utilized by prophets, priests, and rabbis.
3. Broadly refers to the entire Jewish canon as encountered by Muslim scholars in translation or polemical debates.

Islamic tradition distinguishes between the Torah and Scrolls of Moses. However, some view them as synonymous.

== Relationship with the Quran ==
In Islam theology, the Torah is recognized as a sacred scriptural revelation bestowed by God upon Moses on Mount Sinai to govern and guide the Children of Israel.

The analysis of the relationship between the Quran and the Torah is conducted through intertextuality, literary dependence, and late-antique scriptural reception instead of historical sequencing.

The Quran does not merely retell the stories from the Torah but interpretation of the Torah's legal and narrative themes.

Within the Quran, the text references the Torah and the Gospel (Injil), establishing its own authority alongside the other scriptures.

=== Self-referentiality ===
Academic analysis highlights how the Quran selectively affirms certain components of Mosaic law as well as relaxing others, such as dietary laws. These adjustments may appear as corrections to Israelite practices rather than a contradiction of God's original law.

=== Literary allusions ===
The Quran rarely quotes the Torah verbatim. Instead, it uses allusions, typological figures, and summaries to contextualize its own messages while indirectly referencing other texts.

=== Comparative legal framework ===
Quranic framework of the Torah acknowledges the Tawrat primarily as the legal code designed for community governance (ahkam). The Quran references legal statutes present in the Torah with the addition of a distinct theological principle of divine mercy, repentance, and spiritual mitigation over strict judicial exactness.

== Exegesis ==
Early and medieval Muslim scholars regularly made use of the Jewish traditions and biblical passages in exegesis (tafsir). In the medieval period, the Islamic methodology of tafsir al-Qur'an bi-l-Kitab (Arabic: تفسير القرآن بالكتاب), interpreting the Qur'an through the Bible, was developed by Muslim scholars. This approach adopts canonical Arabic versions of the Bible, including the Tawrat and the Injil, both to illuminate and to add exegetical depth to the reading of the Qur'an.

During the early centuries of Islam, traditionalists incorporated narrative material from Jewish converts and local Jewish communities, known as Isra'iliyyat, to elaborate on the prophetic stories in commentaries.

Notable Muslim commentators of the Bible and Qur'an who weaved biblical texts together with Qur'anic ones include Abu al-Hakam Abd al-Salam ibn al-Ishbili of al-Andalus and Ibrahim ibn Umar ibn Hasan al-Biqa'i.
