= Ibn Barrajan =

Arab Andalusian Sufi and philosopher

Ibn Barrajān ابن برجان
- Born: Taifa of Seville
- Died: 1141; Marrakesh, Almoravid dynasty

Abū al-Ḥakam ʿAbd al-Salām b. ʿAbd al Raḥmān b. Abī al-Rijāl Muḥammad b. ʿAbd al-Raḥmān al-Lakhmī al-Ifrīqī al-Ishbīlī (Arabic: عبد السلام بن عبد الرحمن بن محمد بن برجان اللخمي; died 1141) was an Andalusian Sufi master and hadith scholar. He spread his teachings in the first half of the 12th century.

== Works ==
Ibn Barrajan wrote a two-volume commentary on the names of God in Islam and two famous tafsirs, ʾīḍāḥ al-ḥikma "Wisdom Deciphered the Unseen Discovered", which exists in a critical edition. and Tanbih al-Afham Ila Tadabbur al-Kitab al-Hakim wa Ta'arruf al-Ayat wa-l-Naba al-'Athim, which is currently in print in three editions.

Ibn Barrajan is most famous for his prediction of the conquest of Jerusalem from the Crusaders by Saladin, only being a few days off.

His writings had a great influence on Ibn 'Arabi, who was quite sceptical of ibn Barrajan's methods of prognostication of the Jerusalem conquest, calling them ʿIlm al-Hurūf.

== Death ==
He died in prison in Marrakesh, when he was summoned to that city by the Almoravid sultan Ali ibn Yusuf, who feared his influence. Against the wishes of the sultan he received an official burial on the initiative of Ali ibn Harzihim.

== See also ==
- List of Ash'aris and Maturidis
