= St John the Baptist Church, Newcastle upon Tyne =

St John the Baptist
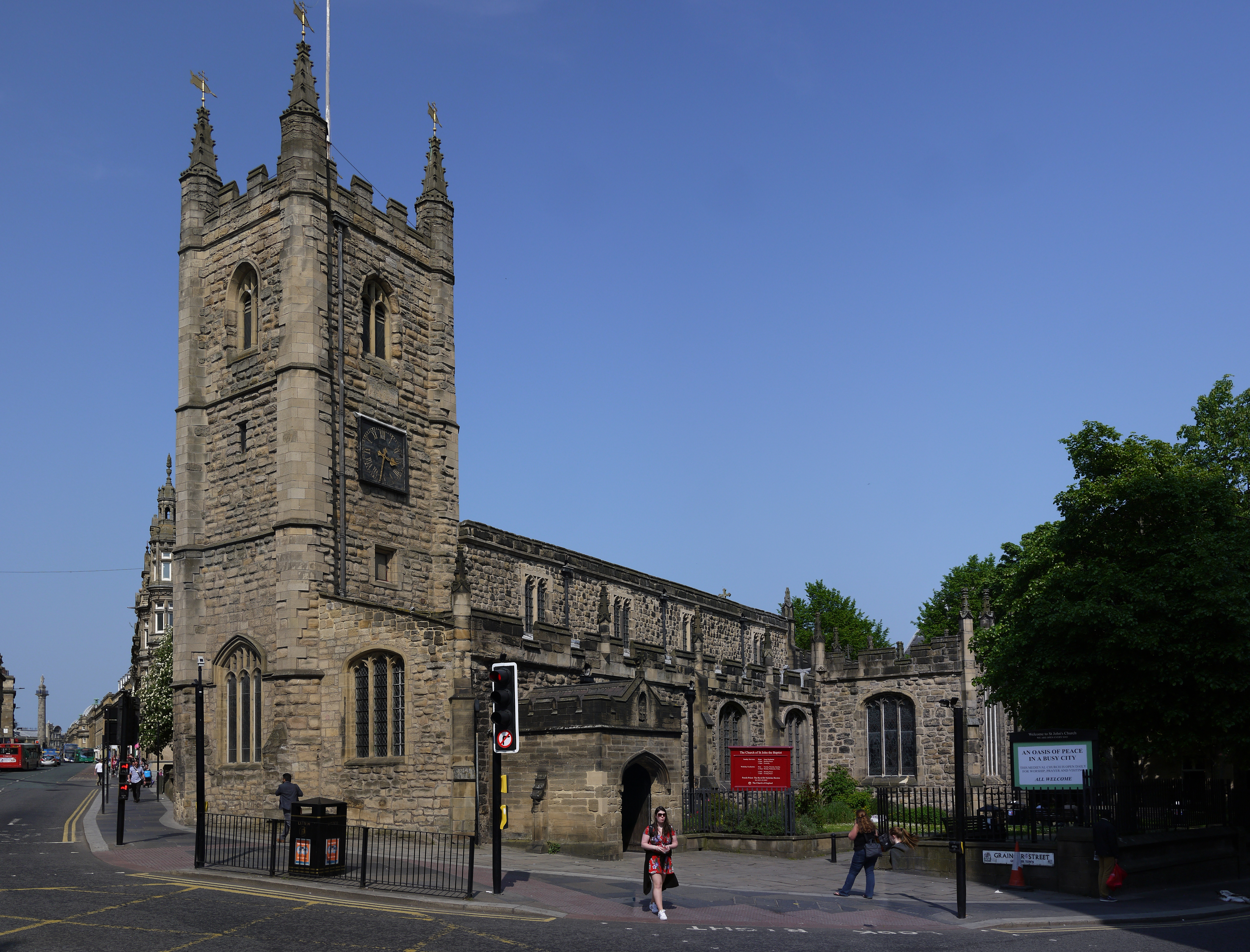

- St John the Baptist shown within Tyne and Wear
- 54.9701°N 1.6155°W
- OS grid reference: NZ245639
- Location: Grainger Street, Newcastle upon Tyne NE1 5JG
- Country: England
- Denomination: Anglican
- Churchmanship: Traditional Catholic
- Website: St John the Baptist Church

History
- Status: Parish church

Architecture
- Functional status: Active

St John's Church is a 13th-century church on the corner of Grainger Street and Westgate Road in Newcastle upon Tyne, England, dedicated to St John the Baptist. It is a Grade I listed building.

== History and building description ==
The old church of St John is believed to date from c.1130. William Gray, a 16th-century topographer and burgess of Newcastle, called it "a pretty little church, commended by an arch-prelate of this kingdom because it resembled much a cross".

The church, surrounded by modern buildings on three sides, is modest, with a low square tower featuring small pinnacles and windows with flattened arched tops. A stone in the south transept window commemorates Robert Rhodes, the builder of St Nicholas' Cathedral's steeple in Newcastle, and a benefactor to the town's churches. The current stone is a copy of the original, removed around 1861 during repairs, and now housed in the castle.

=== Interior ===
The 15th-century font cover and the Jacobean pulpit are examples of local woodwork. The chancel, now the Lady Chapel, contains a window including the fragments of medieval glass with the earliest known representation of the arms of Newcastle. Further along the wall is a cruciform opening which enabled the anchorite, whose cell was above the present sacristy, to see the altar. The rood and reredos are both the work of Sir Charles Nicholson.

=== Present day ===
As a traditionalist Anglo-Catholic church that rejects the ordination of women as priests and bishops, it receives alternative episcopal oversight from the Bishop of Beverley (currently Stephen Race).

== Graveyard ==
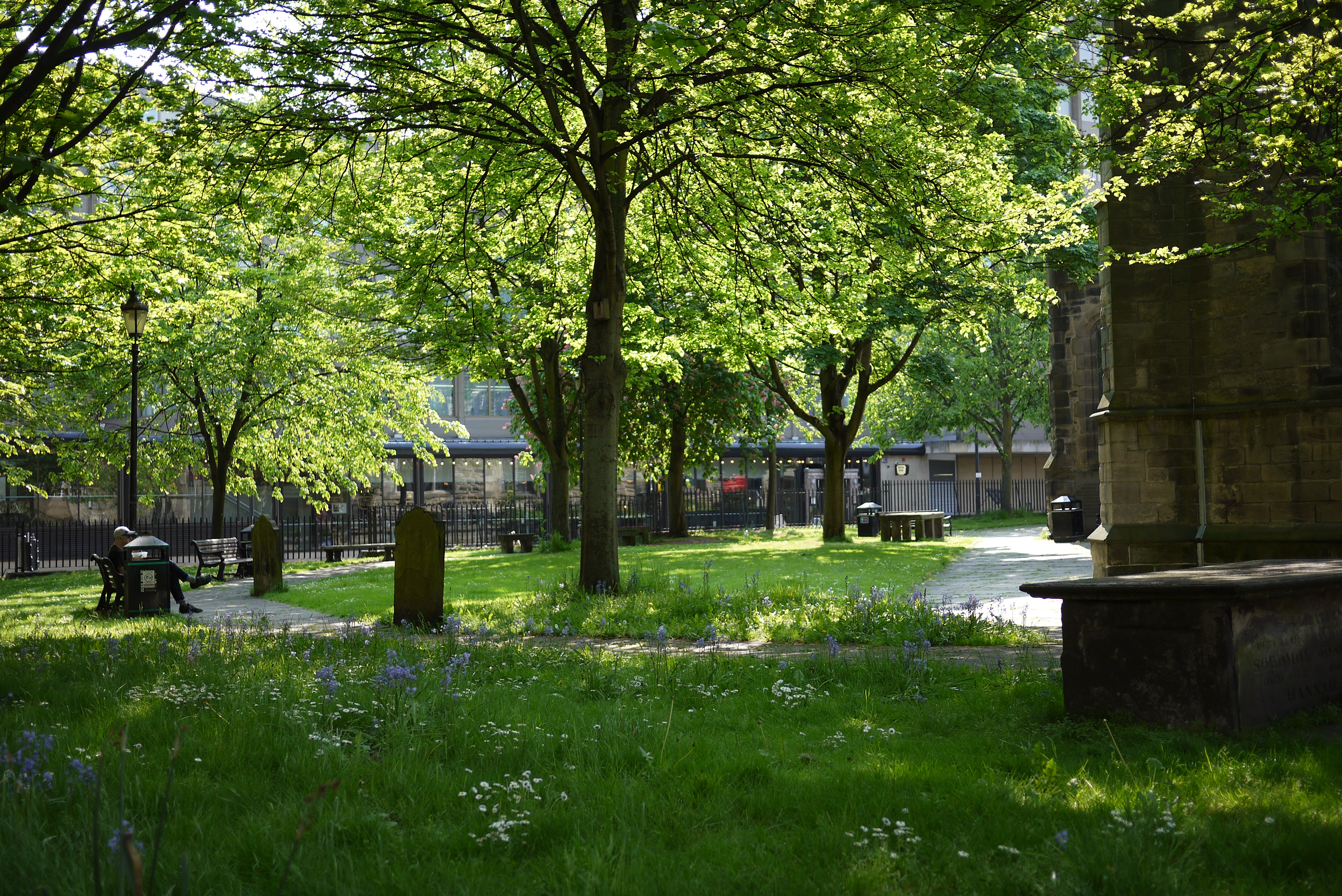
The remains of the graveyard

Part of the graveyard was built over in the 1960s for meeting rooms and a hall. As of 2010, there remained about ten gravestones. Two of these, that to Solomon Hodgson (died 1800) and Sarah Hodgson, owners of the Newcastle Chronicle, and that to the artist Ralph Waters are listed Grade II.

The Dublin-born actor and poet John Cunningham is buried in the graveyard. Not far from the east window lies a stone slab, part of a table monument, its four supporting pillars lying half buried in the soil beneath it. The inscription on it reads as follows:

Here lie the Remains of
JOHN CUNNINGHAM
Of his excellence
As a Pastoral Poet
His works will remain a monument
for ages
After this temporary Tribute of Esteem
Is in dust forgotten.
He died in Newcastle Sep. 18, 1773,
Aged 44.

== See also ==
- St John the Baptist’s Church web site
- Photographs here
