= Ann Fisher (grammarian) =

English grammarian (1719–1778)

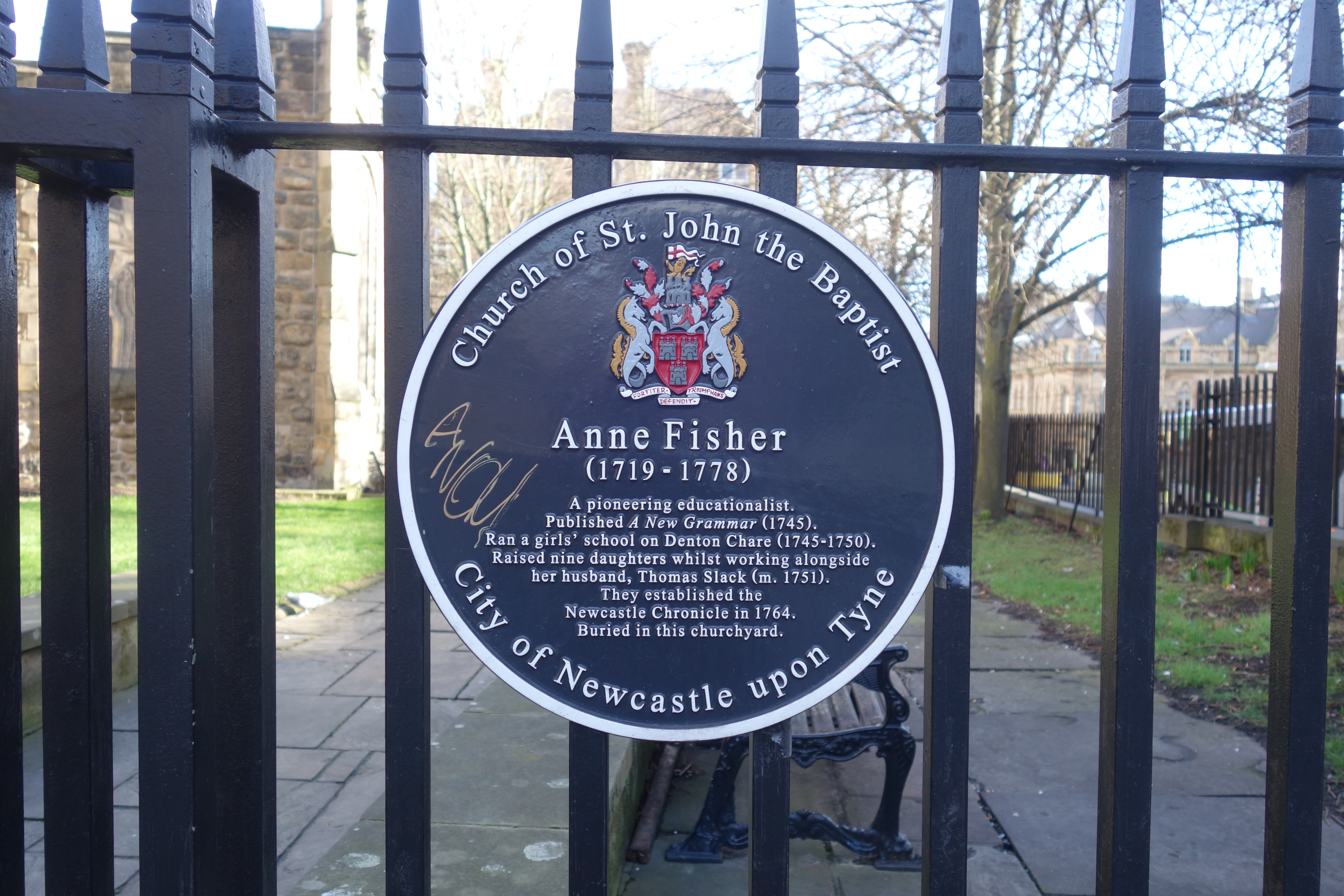
- Plaque for Ann Fisher at St John the Baptist's Church, Newcastle upon Tyne
- Born: Lorton, Cumberland
- Baptised: 9 December 1719
- Died: 2 May 1778 (aged 58); Newcastle upon Tyne
- Burial place: St. John’s Church, Newcastle upon Tyne
- Other names: Anne Fisher; Ann Slack; A. Fisher; Ann Fisher Slack
- Occupation: Grammarian
- Years active: c. 1745-1778
- Known for: first woman to publish modern English grammar; first woman to publish English dictionary
- Notable work: A Practical New Grammar (1750); An Accurate New Spelling Dictionary (1773)
- Movement: Reformation of English grammar
- Spouse: Thomas Slack (m. 1751)
- Children: Mary (1752-1825), Ann (1754-1784), Jane (1755-1776), Elizabeth (1758-1789), Sarah (Hodgson) (1760-1822), Frances (1762-1765), Hanah (1764-1855), Margaret (1766-1768), Margaret (1768)

Ann Fisher (later Slack; c. 9 December 1719 – 2 May 1778) was an English grammarian and successful author of several books. With A New Grammar (1745), she became the first woman to publish on modern English grammar, although Elizabeth Elstob had published a grammar of Anglo-Saxon (Old English) in 1715. She was also the first woman to publish an English dictionary, and the first grammarian to suggest that masculine pronouns (i.e. “he”, etc.) be used generically. Her daughter Sarah inherited and ran The Newcastle Chronicle, which Fisher and her husband had co-founded.

== Life ==
Fisher was born in Lorton, Cumberland, England, the daughter of Henry Fisher, yeoman, of Oldscale (in Wythop). She ran a school for girls for five years. Not much else is known of her life until her marriage, in December 1751, to Thomas Slack (1723-1784), a publisher and bookseller from Newcastle upon Tyne. Together they had nine daughters, one of whom died in infancy. Two others died in early childhood; only five of the nine outlived their mother. Together the couple conducted a number of businesses, including the press and the newspaper they founded, The Newcastle Chronicle. She was part of a cultured circle of friends which included James Robertson, poet Robert Carr, engraver Thomas Bewick, local newspaper-owner Gilbert Gray, poet John Cunningham, and salonnière Elizabeth Montagu.

She died in 1778, from asthma, at the age of 58. The newspaper stayed within the family, and her daughter Sarah Hodgson was left the business by her husband.

== Writing ==
Fisher may have published one or more works when she was younger, as the title page of her first known work, A New Grammar, states that it is "By the author of The child's Christian education, and others." The child's Christian education is attributed to a Daniel Fisher, which may have been a pseudonym used by Ann Fisher. What is known is that although when Fisher began publishing she did so anonymously, by 1754 she was signing her works "A. Fisher" and she maintained that practice for the rest of her professional career.

=== A Practical New Grammar (1750) ===
The earliest example extant of A New Grammar: Being the Most Easy Guide to Speaking and Writing the English Language Properly and Correctly is a copy of the second, 1750 edition, published in Newcastle. This was followed by at least thirty other editions by 1800, and the text continued to be published into the nineteenth century. It was entitled A Practical New Grammar... from 1759 onwards. In the text, Fisher uses examples of non-standard English as a way to teach grammar. She criticizes grammarians' traditional application of Latinate rules to the English vernacular, and was the first to suggest the pronoun he might be used for both sexes. Her work was often plagiarized and borrowed outright by subsequent authors. Among those it influenced by Fisher's innovations were the language reformers Thomas Sheridan and Thomas Spence.

=== The Pleasing Instructor or Entertaining Moralist (1756) ===
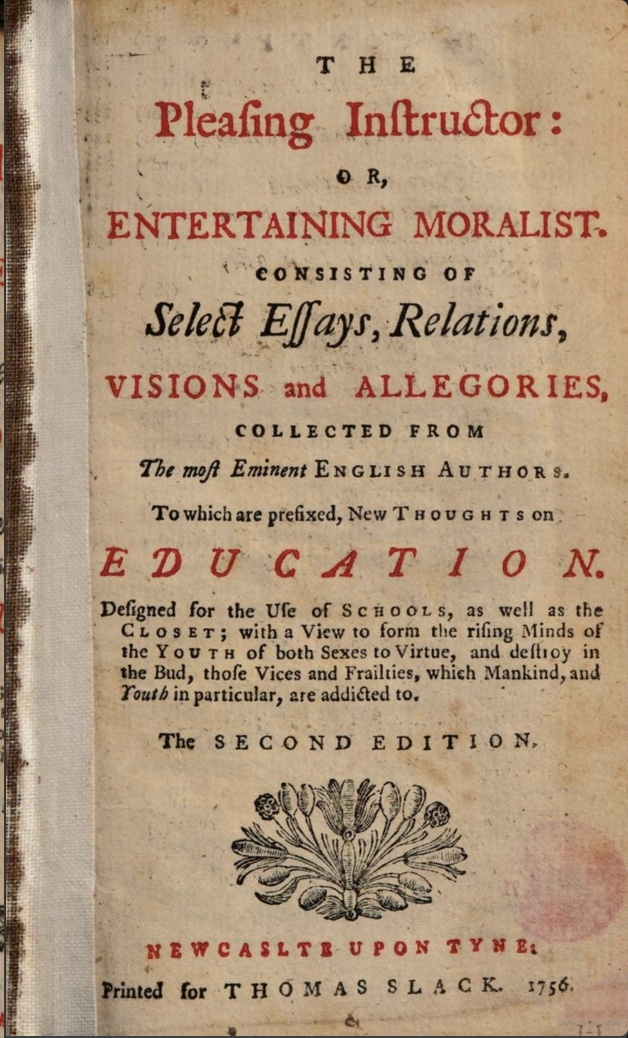
Title page of Ann Fisher's The Pleasing Instructor or Entertaining Moralist 2nd ed. Newcastle upon Tyne: Thomas Slack (1756)

After A Practical New Grammar, The Pleasing Instructor was Fisher's most popular publication with twenty-nine editions. In contrast to the more weighty Grammar, The Pleasing Instructor is an anthology of short pieces from contemporary journals such as The Spectator, and well-known writers such as Elizabeth Carter. In her introduction, Fisher argues for better education for girls and women, though she does not, she writes, "mean to recommend reading at the expense of sewing."

=== An Accurate New Spelling Dictionary, and Expositor of the English Language (1773) ===
Fisher was the first woman to produce a dictionary of English, but the path was not easy. She prepared to add a student's dictionary to her catalogue of school books in 1771 with the publication of An Accurate New Spelling Dictionary, and Expositor of the English Language, but the Dilly Brothers, publishers of John Entick's New Spelling Dictionary, entered a lawsuit for piracy against her London publisher, G. Robinson, in what one commentator has described as "a commercial manoeuvre." As a consequence, Fisher's dictionary was initially suppressed although the case was ultimately settled in her favour. In 1773, she reissued the first edition as, according to the title page, the second edition of that work. Copies of the edition of 1773, the 3rd edition of 1777, and a 6th edition in 1788 are still extant. Alston notes a 4th edition in 1781, but copies of this edition, like the original, withdrawn first edition, may be lost forever.

== Works ==
- A Practical New Grammar (1745): more than 40 editions
- The Pleasing Instructor or Entertaining Moralist (1756): 29 editions
- The New English Exercise Book (1770)
- An Accurate New Spelling Dictionary, and Expositor of the English Language (1773)
- The New English Tutor (1774): 13 editions
- The Young Scholar’s Delight (1802)

== See also ==
- Evening Chronicle
- History of English grammars

== Etexts ==
- Fisher, Ann. A Practical New Grammar (Orig. pub. 1750; 18th ed. 1790)
- Fisher, Ann. The Pleasing Instructor (Orig. pub. 1756; 2nd ed. 1756)
- Fisher, Ann. An Accurate New Spelling Dictionary, and Expositor of the English Language (Orig. pub. 1773; 3rd ed. 1777)

== External resources ==
- Gil, María Esther Rodríguez. "Ann Fisher: first female grammarian." Historical Sociolinguistics and Sociohistorical Linguistics 2 (Nov. 2002). Accessed 2023-02-10.
- O'Conner, Patricia T. "Sex symbols." Grammarphobia. 7 Oct. 20. Accessed 12. Feb. 2023.
- "Ann Fisher." Orlando: Women’s Writing in the British Isles from the Beginnings to the Present. Cambridge UP. Accessed 2023-02-10.
- Ostade, Ingrid Tieken-Boon van. "Female Grammarians of the Eighteenth Century." Historical Sociolinguistics and Sociohistorical Linguistics 1 (Aug. 2000). Accessed 2023-02-10.
- "Fisher, Ann." The Women's Print History Project, 2019, Person ID 1092. Accessed 2023-02-10.
