= Bible translations into Arabic =

Arabic translations of the Bible (Arabic: الكتاب المقدس, "The holy book") constitute one of the richest traditions of Bible transmission. Translations of the Bible into Arabic were produced by Arabic-speaking Jews (Rabbanite and Karaite), Christians, and Samaritans. Even though Arabic was spoken by Jews and Christians before the emergence of Islam, running Arabic translations of the Bible are attested in manuscripts only from the 9th century onwards. Quotations from the Bible in Arabic (so-called testimonia) are attested from earlier centuries, especially among Christians.

The Bible was translated into Arabic from a variety of source languages. These include Coptic, Greek, Hebrew, Latin, and Syriac. Judeo-Arabic translations can also exhibit influence of the Aramaic Targums. Especially in the 19th century, Arabic Bible translations start to express regional colloquial dialects. The different communities that produced Arabic translations of the Bible also used different alphabets to write Arabic. Accordingly, Arabic translations of the Bible are found in Greek, Hebrew, Samaritan, and Syriac (Garshuni) script. Arabic versions of biblical books were not confined to their original communities. Especially Coptic Christians displayed considerable interest in Christian and non-Christian versions, which were based on different source languages. Already at an early stage, bilingual or multilingual manuscripts were produced. New translations are still made in the 21st century. The transmission of the Bible in Arabic, hence, spans a history of almost one and a half millennia.

There is no general agreement regarding the text-critical value of early Arabic translations of the Bible, but it is often deemed to be small. They might have some importance for secondary translations like the Peshitta or the Septuagint. However, under the influence of New Philology scholarship has recently begun to value Arabic Bible translations in their own right. Importantly, digitization has increasingly made available manuscript sources, especially those from Saint Catherine’s Monastery, the Cairo Genizah, and the Firkovitch collections. Another important resources is the large-scale digitization project of the Hill Museum & Manuscript Library. Still, there is only a small number of critical editions of Arabic versions of the Bible.

== Old translations ==
Part of what appears to be the oldest Arabic Bible or New Testament in existence was discovered in the 19th century at Saint Catherine's Monastery. The manuscript called Mt. Sinai Arabic Codex 151, was created in AD 867 in Damascus by someone named Bishr Ibn Al Sirri. Although it is a large, bound book, it only contains the Book of Acts and the Epistles, translated from Aramaic (Syriac). It includes the biblical text, marginal comments, lectionary notes, and glosses.

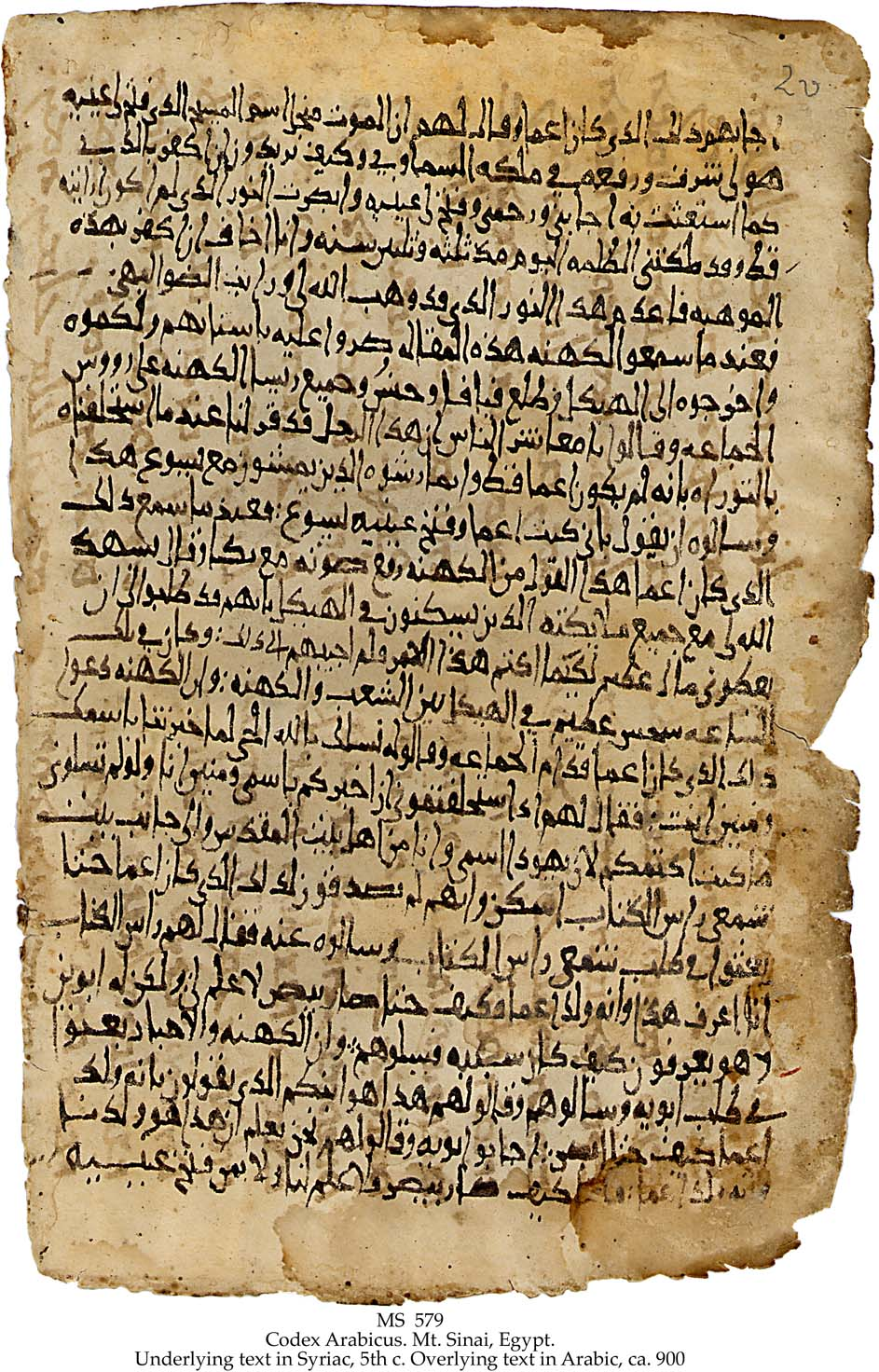
Codex Arabicus

The Codex Arabicus from Saint Catherine's Monastery is a palimpsest containing (among other texts) John 9:16-38 in Arabic, from around AD 900.

The earliest fragment of the Old Testament in Arabic is a text of Psalm 77, found in the Umayyad Mosque. Initially it was dated to the end of the 8th century by Bruno Violet, the scholar who discovered the fragments in 1901. However recent research has paleographically dated this manuscript to late 9th- and early 10th century on the basis of analysis of newly rediscovered photographs of the text.

== Translating the tetragrammaton and "Lord" ==
Most Arabic translations have translated Yahweh (יהוה), the Hebrew name of God (LORD or Jehovah in English / Kyrios in Greek), as Allāh or al-Rabb (الله or الرب, respectively). These are similar to the appellations utilized by Muslims in Classical Arabic, but the term Ar-rabb is quite distinct from Muslim usage, which normally does not use the definite article, instead predominantly making use of a vocative without an article (with or without an affixed possessive pronoun). The Aramaic Mār / Mōr (teacher or lord) is translated as Rabb or Sayyid (رب or سيِّد, respectively). There are many cases where an etymological connection exists between an Arabic word and the original Hebrew or Aramaic text, yet it is translated into a colloquial or a commonly used word instead.

== Mozarabic ==
The Bible texts produced by the Mozarabs which have survived to the present day are the translations of the Gospels, the Psalms and the Canons. It is assumed that the Bible was also translated in its entirety by the Christians of Al-Andalus. Most of the translations date to the twelfth century or later, although a few are as early as the tenth century. One of these manuscripts is still kept at the Qarawiyyin Library in Fez, Morocco. It is a 12th-century Mozarab parchment containing the gospels of John. Ishaq ibn Balask of Cordoba translated the gospels into Arabic in 946. Hafs ibn Albar made a translation of the Psalms in 889.

== Jewish ==
In the 10th century AD Saadia Gaon wrote a Tafsir, an Arabic translation of the Torah and some other Biblical books with a commentary. These were written in Hebrew characters (Judaeo-Arabic). Much of the commentary is lost, but the translation of the Torah and several other books has survived intact, and even serves as part of the liturgy of Yemenite Jews, who read the Torah in the synagogue with each Hebrew verse translated twice: first to the Aramaic targum and then to Saadia's Tafsir.

As the language of Saadia Gaon's translation became archaic and remote from common speech, most Jewish communities of the Arab world evolved their own translations of the Torah into their local dialects of Judaeo-Arabic. A traditional translation of this kind is known as a sharḥ (plural shurūḥ), from the Arabic word for "explanation". These translations were generally used for teaching purposes rather than in the synagogue, and many of them were printed in the late 19th and early 20th centuries.

== Later Christian translations ==
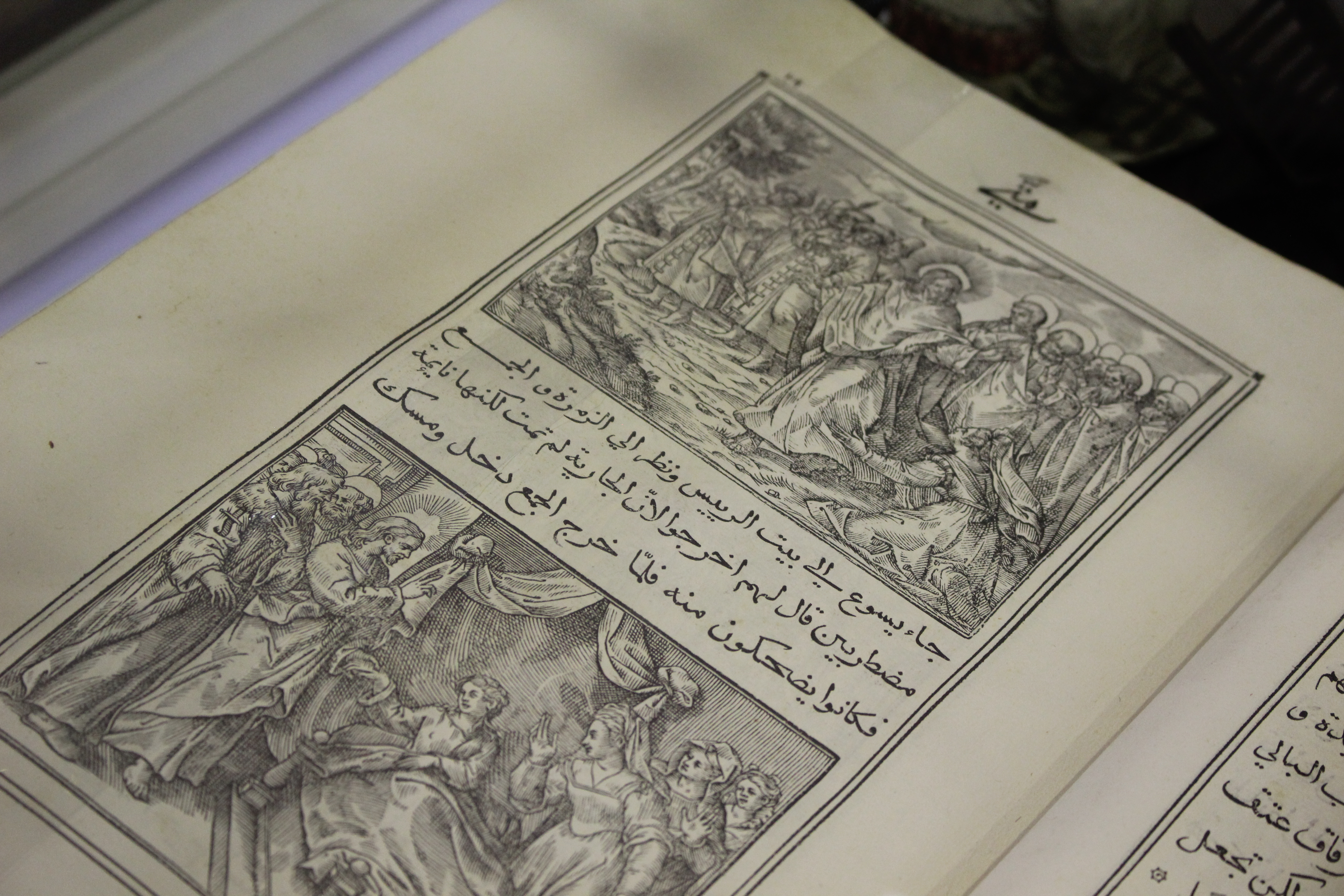
Biblia Arabica, 1590-1591

=== 17th century ===
In 1671 the Catholic Church published the whole Bible in Arabic at Rome. The translation was done under the direction of Sergius Risi, the Catholic Archbishop of Damascus, as well as of Dominican Vincenzo Candido, professor of theology at the Roman College of Saint Thomas. Francis Britius aided the translation.

=== 19th century ===
In 1811 Sarah Hodgson published "The holy bible, containing the old and new testaments, in the Arabic language" in Newcastle.

A later modern translations to Arabic was at the initiative of the Society for Promoting Christian Knowledge. Around 1846, the Society commanded this work to the Orientalist Samuel Lee (1783–1852). Rev. Dr. Lee invited to Cambridge the Lebanese scholar Ahmad Faris Shidyaq to participate in the translation. The translation of the Bible was published in 1857, after the death of Samuel Lee, thanks to his pupil and friend Professor Thomas Jarrett. This translation is still considered one of the best Arabic translations of the Bible.

The most popular translation is the Van Dyck Version, funded by the Syrian Mission and the American Bible Society. The project was the brainchild of Eli Smith, and started around 1847, centered in Beirut. After Eli Smith's death it was completed under the direction of Cornelius Van Alen Van Dyck. Others involved included Nasif al-Yaziji, Boutros al Bustani, and Yusuf al-Asir. The New Testament was completed on March 9, 1860, followed by the Old Testament on March 10, 1865. The original manuscript is preserved in the Near East School of Theology Library in Beirut. About 10 million copies of this version have been distributed since 1865. It has been accepted by the Coptic Church, the Syriac Orthodox Church and the Protestant churches. This translation was based mostly on the same Textus Receptus as the English King James Version of the Bible, and follows a more literal style of translation. Most printings of the Van Dyck version use the same basic printing plates which have been employed for years (possibly the same plates that were made when the translation was first adopted). These plates are typeset in a manner consistent with calligraphic Arabic conventions, in which, for example, letters that precede other specified letters, such as jīm, are written vertical to rather than horizontal to that letter. Due to the proliferation of simplified Arabic typography because of the challenges of early digital typesetting, this style of Arabic has become less common and may be difficult to read for non-native students of Arabic. More recently, newer printings of the Van Dyck have been made which employ simplified Arabic typesetting without vertical variation.

The Van Dyck translation was done at the beginning of the revival of Modern Standard Arabic as a literary language, and consequently many of the terms coined did not enter into common use. One indication of this is a recent edition of the Van Dyck printed by the Bible Society in Egypt, which includes a glossary of little-understood vocabulary, with around 3000 entries. In addition to obsolete or archaic terms, this translation uses religious terminology that Muslim or other non-Christian readers may not understand (e.g. إصحاح ișḥāḥ, a Syriac borrowing meaning a chapter of the Bible; تجديف tajdīf, the word for blasphemy.) It should also be noted that an Arab Muslim reading the Bible in Arabic (especially if reading the New Testament) will find the style quite different from the style that is used in the Qur'an (this is more or less true of all Arabic translations of the Bible). Also of note is the fact that religious terminology familiar to Muslims was not very much used in this version of the Bible, as is the case in most Arabic versions of the Bible.

As a counter-reaction to Van Dyck's Protestant translation, the Jesuits of Beirut started to prepare their own Catholic translation of the Bible soon after. The first volume of this work was published in 1876, with the whole New Testament in 1878, and the complete Bible already in 1880. The main contributors in the translator team were Father Augustin Rodet and Sheikh Ibrahim al-Yaziji.

=== 20th century ===
In 1973 the Living Bibles International launched a new translation of the Arabic Bible under the direction of Georges Houssney, a Lebanese Christian based in Beirut. Houssney employed two key translators, Said Baz for the New Testament completed in 1982, and Dr. Samuel Shahid for the Old Testament completed in 1988. Rev. Menes Abdul Noor contributed significantly. Initially, the project was vehemently opposed by the proponents of the Smith & Van Dyck translation. Mr. Houssney made a tactical decision to model the translation after the popular NIV and named it "Book of Life, an interpretive translation" (in Arabic, كتاب الحياة ترجمة تفسيرية kitāb al-ḥayāh tarjamah tafsīriyyah). The result was wide acceptance throughout the Arab world. In 1992 it was dubbed the New Arabic Version (NAV) after Living Bibles International merged with International Bible Society, now Biblica. The nearest English translation to the New Arabic Version is the New International Version. Translators consulted various English and Arabic translations and checked thoroughly against the Greek and Hebrew original texts with the aid of a team of scholars. Among the scholars who advised on the original languages are Dr. Kenneth Bailey, Dr. David King, Dr. Ghassan Khalaf, and Dr. Maurice Seale. This version is the most widely distributed with several million copies in circulation. However a more significant fact about this project is that Christians in the Arab world began to accept the idea of new translations after seeing the importance of a clear and contemporary Arabic style.

In 1988 the Jesuit publishing company Dar el-Machreq published a revised version of the 1880 Catholic translation, which has sold more than 60,000 copies between 1988 and 2000.

In 1992 the Bible Society, released Today's Arabic Version, a dynamic equivalence translation designed to be as easy to understand as possible. It is also known as the Good News Arabic (GNA) or the Ecumenical Version (الترجمة المشتركة at-tarjamah al-mushtarakah), in that it was produced by an interdenominational team of scholars and church leaders. It was conceived as the Arabic equivalent of the English Good News Bible (also known as the Today's English Version), but is in reality more like the English New International Version.

In the 1980s an Egyptian Christian found that his Muslim friends could not understand the Bible. He began with a translation of the Gospel of Mark, and their enthusiasm led him to translate the entire New Testament, completed in 1990. This translation was titled "The Noble Gospel" al-injīl ash-sharīf (الإنجيل الشريف). The language is quite simple, with vocabulary deliberately chosen to be common with vernacular Arabic. It is much clearer in many passages than other translations, but it is not very elegant. It uses Arabic proper names and religious terminology understood by most Arabic speakers, rather than foreign names and ecclesiastical terminology found in older translations. The full Bible was published in 2000, and titled "The Noble Book" al-ketab ash-sharif (الكتاب الشريف), also known as the "Sharif Bible".

=== 21st Century ===
In 2000, Jehovah's Witnesses released their New World Translation of the Christian Greek Scriptures (New Testament) in Arabic. The Hebrew Scriptures (Old Testament) was translated and released along the Greek Scriptures as a complete Bible in 2004.

In 2005, Syrian Arab author Mazhar Mallouhi brought together Christians and Muslims to produce a new translation of the Gospels and Acts in Arabic. The result of their collective efforts was published in Beirut in March 2008 under the title The True Meaning of the Gospel of Christ (المعنى الصحيح لإنجيل المسيح al-ma‘nā aṣ-ṣaḥīḥ li’injīl al-masīḥ). The goal of the project was a translation of the gospel message that would speak clearly to Arabic speakers unfamiliar with church terminology and traditions. The volume, published by Al-Kalima and printed by the Dar al-Farabi publishing house, features a culturally sensitive translation of the four Gospels and the Book of Acts in modern literary Arabic, with footnotes providing cultural background information essential to understanding the text. There is also a collection of 26 articles on related topics of particular interest to Arab readers, as well as introductions to each of the Gospels and Acts, illustrations and maps. The 2nd edition of the Gospels and Acts was published in 2016, with terms for Father and Son following recommended renderings from a committee of experts, and the New Testament Epistles were also published in 2016 under the title "The Bold Proclamation of the Apostles of Christ" (البيان الصريح لحواريي المسيح al-bayān aṣ-ṣarīḥ li’ḥawāriyyī al-masīḥ). A selection of 46 selected Psalms was published in 2017, stylized and presented by the celebrated poet and scholar Dr. Moncef Ouheibi, under the title "Psalms of Passion for God" (مزامير العشق الإلهي mazāmīr al-'ishq al-ilāhi). In 2019 a collection of stories of the prophets taken from the Old Testament was published with the title Light on the Stories of the Prophets: The Ancient Prophets (أضواء على سِيَر الأنبياء: الأنبياء الأولون aḑwa' ‘ala siyar al-anbiya': al-anbiya' al-awwalūn).

== Comparison ==
Translation	Genesis 1:1–3 (التكوين)	John 3:16 (يوحنا)
Saadia Gaon سعيد بن يوسف	אול מא כׄלק אללה אלסמאואת ואלארץׄ׃ ואלארץׄ כאנת גאמרה̈ ומסתבחרה̈ וטׄלאם עלי וגׄה אלגמר וריח אללה תהבّ עלי וגׄה אלמא׃ ושא אללה אן יכון נור פכאן נור׃ اول ما خلق الله السماوات والارض. والارض كانت غامرة ومستبحرة وظلام على وجه الغمر وريح الله تهبّ على وجه الما. وشا الله ان يكون نور فكان نور.	N.A.
Van Dyck (or Van Dyke) فانديك	في البدء خلق الله السماوات والأرض. وكانت الأرض خربة وخالية وعلى وجه الغمر ظلمة وروح الله يرف على وجه المياه. وقال الله: «ليكن نور» فكان نور.	لأنه هكذا أحب الله العالم حتى بذل ابنه الوحيد لكي لا يهلك كل من يؤمن به بل تكون له الحياة الأبدية.
Book of Life كتاب الحياة	في البدء خلق الله السماوات والأرض، وإذ كانت الأرض مشوشة ومقفرة وتكتنف الظلمة وجه المياه، وإذ كان روح الله يرفرف على سطح المياه، أمر الله: «ليكن نور» فصار نور.	لأنه هكذا أحب الله العالم حتى بذل ابنه الوحيد لكي لا يهلك كل من يؤمن به بل تكون له الحياة الأبدية.
Revised Catholic الترجمة الكاثوليكية المجددة	في البدء خلق الله السموات والأرض وكانت الأرض خاوية خالية وعلى وجه الغمر ظلام وروح الله يرف على وجه المياه. وقال الله: «ليكن نور»، فكان نور.	فإن الله أحب العالم حتى إنه جاد بابنه الوحيد لكي لا يهلك كل من يؤمن به بل تكون له الحياة الأبدية.
Good News الترجمة المشتركة	في البدء خلق الله السماوات والأرض، وكانت الأرض خاوية خالية، وعلى وجه الغمر ظلام، وروح الله يرف على وجه المياه. وقال الله: «ليكن نور» فكان نور.	هكذا أحب الله العالم حتى وهب ابنه الأوحد، فلا يهلك كل من يؤمن به، بل تكون له الحياة الأبدية.
Sharif Bible الكتاب الشريف	في البداية خلق الله السماوات والأرض. وكانت الأرض بلا شكل وخالية، والظلام يغطي المياه العميقة، وروح الله يرفرف على سطح المياه. وقال الله: «ليكن نور.» فصار نور.	أحب الله كل الناس لدرجة أنه بذل ابنه الوحيد لكي لا يهلك كل من يؤمن به، بل ينال حياة الخلود.
Easy-to-read Version النسخة سهل للقراءة	في البدء خلق الله السماوات والأرض. كانت اﻷرض قاحلة وفارغة. وكان الظلام يلفّ المحيط، وروح الله تحوّم فوق المياه. في ذلك الوقت، قال الله: «ليكن نور.» فصار النور.	فقد أحبّ الله العالم كثيرا، حتى إنه قدّم ابنه الوحيد، لكي لا يهلك كل من يؤمن به، بل تكون له الحياة الأبدية.
True Meaning Arabic المعنى الصحيح لإنجيل المسيح	في البدء، عندما خلق الله السّماوات والأرض، كانت الأرض بلا شكل تعمّها الفوضى، ويهيمن عليها الظلام وتغطّي المياه أعماقها. وسرت نفحات روح الله على وجه المياه. وبكلمة من الله تعالى أمر النّور "كن" فيكون.	لقد أحبّ الله كلّ البشر حتّى إنّه ضحّى بالابن الرّوحيّ الفريد له تعالى فداءً لهم، فلا خوف على المؤمنين به من الهلاك، لأنّ مصيرهم دار الخلد.

Abbreviations used for these Bibles include AVD AVDDV FAOV KEH MAT SAB TMA.

- Al mushtaraka المشتركة
- T K E ت.ك.ع

== See also ==
- Arab Christians
- List of Bible translations by language
- List of Christian terms in Arabic
