= Lectionary 232 =

Lectionary ℓ 232
- New Testament manuscript
- Text: Evangelistarium †
- Date: 14th century
- Script: Greek
- Now at: British Library
- Size: 33.2 cm by 25 cm

Lectionary 232, designated by siglum ℓ 232 (in the Gregory-Aland numbering) is a Greek manuscript of the New Testament, on parchment. Palaeographically it has been assigned to the 14th century. Scrivener labelled it by 226^{evl}. Some leaves of the codex were lost.

== Description ==
The codex contains lessons from the Gospels of John, Matthew, Luke lectionary (Evangelistarium), on 295 parchment leaves (size 33.2 cm by 25 cm), with some lacunae at the end. The leaves 1-14 were supplied by a later hand (according to Gregory in the 14th century).

The text is written in Greek minuscule letters, in two columns per page, 25 lines per page. The initial letters in red, it contains musical notes (in red).

There are weekday Gospel lessons.

== History ==
Bloomfield dated the manuscript to the 9th century, Todd to the 13th century, Gregory to the 12th century. Scrivener even did not try to assign the manuscript to any century, he only quoted opinions of Bloomfield and Todd. It has been assigned by the INTF to the 14th century.

The manuscript once belonged to Joseph Dacre Carlyle, Orientalist, who brought the manuscript from Syria. After his death it was presented to the Lambeth Palace Library (shelf number 1193), by his wife, along with major part of his manuscript collection, in 1806. The codex now is housed at the British Library (Add MS 29713) in London.

The manuscript was examined and described by S. T. Bloomfield, H. J. Todd, Scrivener, and Gregory. It was added to the list of New Testament manuscripts by Scrivener (number 226) and Gregory (number 232). Gregory saw it in 1883.

The manuscript is not cited in the critical editions of the Greek New Testament (UBS3).

== See also ==
- List of New Testament lectionaries
- Biblical manuscript
- Textual criticism

== Bibliography ==
- S. T. Bloomfield, Critical Annotations: Additional and Supplementary on the New Testament (1860)
- H. J. Todd, An Account of Greek Manuscripts, chiefly biblical, which had been in the possession of the late Professor Carlyle, the greater part of which are now deposited in the Archiepiscopal Library at Lambeth Palace (London 1823), p. 51 [description uses some abbreviations explained in introduction, e.g. S = Syria]
