= Wilhelm Creizenach =

19th/20th-century German historian

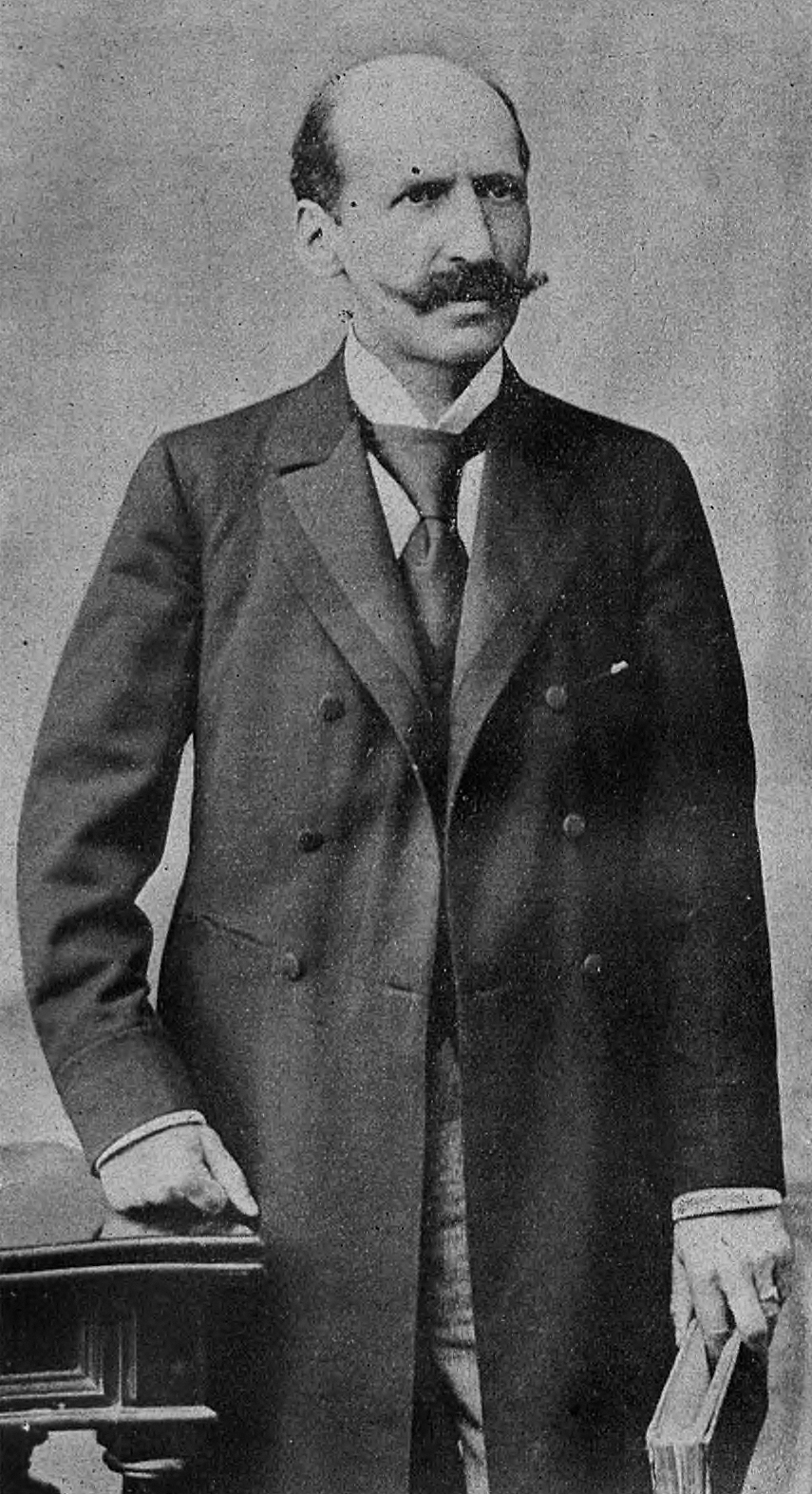
- Born: Wilhelm Michael Anton Creizenach; 4 June 1851; Frankfurt
- Died: 13 May 1919 (aged 67); Dresden
- Occupation: Historian
- Writing career
- Genre: Non-fiction

Wilhelm Michael Anton Creizenach (4 June 1851 – 13 May 1919) was a German historian and librarian.

== Early life ==
Creizenach was the son of Theodore (1818–1877), poet, Hebraist, a prominent expert on work of Goethe, and Luise Flerscheim. He was educated at the local school in Frankfurt, then studied history and Germanic Philology at the University of Göttingen (1870–1872), New Philology at the University of Leipzig (1872–1874), and Indo-European comparative syntax and Sanskrit at the University of Jena (1875–1876).

== Career ==
In 1873, Creizenach received his doctorate in Leipzig for work on Judas Iscariot in Sage und Legende des Mittelalters. During his studies at Jena while working in the university library in the years 1876–1878, he was an assistant in the library of the University of Wroclaw.

In 1879, after the presentation of work titled zur Entstehungsgeschichte des deutschen neueren Lustspiels, Creizenach was an assistant professor in the Department of General History of Literature at the University of Leipzig. He taught modern literature and for a time worked as an assistant at the National Library in Paris.

In 1883, Creizenach became a professor at Jagiellonian University. He was head of the German Department. Creizenach contributed to the creation of the Department of Romance Philology at Jagiellonian in 1890 and founded the seminary library Germanistycznego. He created a center in Poland on New Philology. He lectured on various topics in German history, such as Middle Ages to Romantic German literature, the history of the German language, and the art of Shakespeare. He was a member of the Examination Committee for candidates for secondary school teachers.

In 1913, he finished his career in Kraków. He died 6 years later in Dresden in poverty and solitude.
