= New Philology =

New Philology can refer to:

- The nineteenth-century intellectual movement in philology known in German as Neuphilologie
- New Philology (Latin America), a branch of Mexican ethnohistory and philology
- New Philology (medieval studies), an intellectual movement beginning around the late 1980s
