= Minuscule 471 =

- New Testament manuscript
- Text: Gospels †
- Date: 12th century
- Script: Greek
- Now at: Lambeth Palace
- Size: 19.4 cm by 14.6 cm
- Type: Byzantine text-type
- Category: V
- Hand: very elegant

Minuscule 471 (in the Gregory-Aland numbering), α 136 (in the Soden numbering), is a Greek minuscule manuscript of the New Testament, on a parchment. Palaeographically it has been assigned to the 12th century. Scrivener labelled it by number 510. The manuscript has no complex contents.

== Description ==
The codex contains the text of the Gospels on 240 parchment leaves (size 19.4 cm by 14.6 cm), with only one lacunae (Matthew 1:1-13). The text is written in one column per page, 23-24 lines per page.

The text is divided according to the κεφαλαια (chapters), whose numbers are given at the margin, and their τιτλοι (titles of chapters) at the top of the pages. There is also another division according to the smaller Ammonian Sections (in Mark 240 sections - 16:9), but without references to the Eusebian Canons.

It contains liturgical books with hagiographies: Synaxarion and Menologion. It contains the Epistula ad Carpianum, Eusebian Canon tables (later hand), lists of the κεφαλαια (lists of contents) before each Gospel (on paper), lectionary markings at the margin (for liturgical use), and pictures (of poor quality). After the Synaxarion on paper is a curious list of appearances of the Lord to His Apostles from the time of Stephen down to St. Peter's martyrdom.

According to Scrivener it is written in a very minute but graceful hand. Directions for the Church lessons are perpetually found in the margin, and occasionally introduced into the text (e.g. John 3:17; 13:17). The accents and breathings are pretty constant, but not very correct; we have in John 1 οπισω vv. 15.27; εστηκεν v. 26. Scrivener observed iota adscriptum only twice (Luke 8:40; John 1:39), iota subscriptum never. It has usual errors of itacism ε for αι, ι or ει for η, υ for οι, ο for ω and vice versa are found in great abundance. The initial letters of the lessons and lesser sections are inserted in red ink (secunda manu) even where they had been previously given in black ink by the scribe who wrote the manuscript.

It has some grammatical or orthographical peculiarities. It reads εισελθατε (Matthew 7:13), προσεπεσαν (Matthew 7:25), ανεπεσαν (Mark 6:40; John 6:10), εμπροσθε (Matthew 10:32), δραγμη (Luke 15:8.9).

== Text ==
The Greek text of the codex is a representative of the Byzantine text-type. Hermann von Soden classified it as Byzantine commentated text. Aland placed it in Category V. According to the Claremont Profile Method it represents the textual family K^{x} in Luke, Luke 10, and Luke 20.

There are some connections with some important readings from the codices Vaticanus, Ephraemi and the elder uncials described by Wettstein (e.g. Matthew 8:28).

It does not contain the pericope John 7:53-8:11, though the manuscript sometimes agrees with the common text where comparatively few others do (e.g. Matthew 3:8.27). The folios 1-7 on a paper. It has many corrections made by later hand.

== History ==
Currently it is dated by the INTF to the 12th century.

According to Scrivener the manuscript was written by careful and competent scribe. The manuscript was once in Constantinople, but brought from the East to England by Carlyle (1759-1804), professor of Arabic, together with the manuscripts 470, 472, 473, 474, 475, 488, 642.

The manuscript was examined by J. Farrer in 1804, F. H. A. Scrivener, and C. R. Gregory (1883). Scrivener collated and published its text in 1852.

It was added to the list of New Testament manuscript by Scrivener (510) and Gregory (471).

It is currently housed at the Lambeth Palace (1176) in London.

== See also ==
- List of New Testament minuscules
- Biblical manuscript
- Textual criticism
