= Henry Todd (priest) =

English Anglican cleric, librarian and scholar

Henry John Todd (1763 – 1845) was an English Anglican cleric, librarian, and scholar, known as an editor of John Milton.

He was librarian at Lambeth Palace (1803), and examined and described manuscripts, chiefly biblical, which formerly belonged to the orientalist Joseph Dacre Carlyle, and after his death were transferred to the Lambeth Palace. Todd was rector of Settrington (1820).

He was awarded an annual pension by George IV.

== Life ==
He was baptised at Britford or Burtford, near Salisbury, on 13 February 1763, the son of the Rev. Henry Todd, curate of that parish from 1758 to 1765, and of Mary his wife. He was admitted a chorister of Magdalen College, Oxford, on 20 July 1771, and was educated in the college school. On 15 October 1779 he matriculated from Magdalen and graduated B.A. there on 20 February 1784. Soon afterwards he became fellow-tutor and lecturer at Hertford College, where he proceeded M.A. on 4 May 1786. In 1785 he was ordained deacon as curate at East Lockinge, Berkshire, and in 1787 he took priest's orders.

Todd was presented in 1787 by his aunts, the Misses Todd, to the perpetual curacy of St. John and St. Bridget, Beckermet, in Cumberland. Through the interest of his father's friend George Horne, he was appointed to a minor canonry in Canterbury Cathedral, and was exempted from the necessity of residing on his living. The position afforded him opportunities for study and the patronage of Archbishop John Moore.

Through the influence of the archbishop, Todd held during 1791 and 1792, on the gift of the dean and chapter of Canterbury, the sinecure rectory of Orgarswick, and, on the nomination of the same patrons, he was vicar from 1792 to 1801 of Milton, near Canterbury. By 1792 he had become chaplain to Robert Needham, 11th Viscount Kilmorey, and James Duff, 2nd Earl Fife. He was inducted on 9 November 1801 to the rectory of All Hallows, Lombard Street (in the gift of the dean and chapter of Canterbury), which he retained until 1810. He took up residence in London, was elected F.S.A. on 27 May 1802, and became domestic chaplain to John William Egerton, 7th Earl of Bridgewater, on 5 April 1803.

The favour of the Earl secured for Todd the living of Ivinghoe, Buckinghamshire, in December 1803, when he resigned his curacy of Beckermet. He became, on the nomination of the bishop of Rochester, rector (1803–05) of Woolwich. Lord Bridgewater then bestowed on him the vicarage of Edlesbrough, Buckinghamshire, which he kept until 1807, and he is said to have been, on the same nomination, rector of Little Gaddesden in Hertfordshire for a short period in 1805. Todd had been for some time keeper of the manuscripts and records at Lambeth Palace, and by 1807 he was appointed chaplain and librarian to Archbishop Charles Manners-Sutton, who in that year gave him the rectory of Coulsdon, and in 1812 appointed him to the vicarage of Addington, both in Surrey. In December 1812 Todd was created royal chaplain in ordinary (a position which he retained until his death), and in July 1818 he was appointed one of the Six Preachers in Canterbury Cathedral.

Todd vacated all these preferments, except the crown chaplaincy, on his appointment, in November 1820, by the Earl of Bridgewater to the rectory of Settrington in Yorkshire, where he took up his residence. He was appointed by the archbishop, on 9 January 1830, to the prebendal stall of Husthwaite in York Cathedral, and was installed, on the archbishop's gift, on 2 November 1832 as archdeacon of Cleveland. He must by this time have been fairly well off, for Isaac Reed made him a legacy and Charles Dilly the publisher left him £500. In May 1824 he became a member of the Royal Society of Literature; but a pension offered to him by Lord Melbourne was declined. He retained his three Yorkshire preferments until his death at Settrington rectory on 24 December 1845. He was buried in the chancel of his church where a monument of plain white marble commemorates him; a stained-glass window was put by the clergy in the tower at the west end of the church. The epitaph also commemorates his wife, Anne Dixon, who died at Settrington rectory on 14 April 1844, aged 78. They left several daughters.

A miniature of the archdeacon was stealthily painted by a lady. From a sketch of him, taken in 1822, a painting was made by Joseph Smith and placed in Magdalen College school. A few years before his death he presented to the college his collection of books relating to Milton. A selection of books, 'including several scarce tracts and early printed books', was offered by auction in London by King & Lochee long before his death, on 21 March 1814; a copy of the catalogue is held at Cambridge University Library (shelfmark Munby.c.162(10)).

== Works ==
Todd edited in 1798 Comus: a Mask by John Milton, dedicated to Rev. F. H. Egerton. It led to Todd's edition of Poetical Works of Milton, 1801, 6 vols.; reprinted in 1809, 1826, 1842, and 1852. Incorporating the notes of Thomas Warton and others, it became the standard edition. The first volume was issued separately as Account of the Life and Writings of John Milton, and it was republished, modified with new information, in 1809 and 1826; it was superseded by David Masson's monumental Life. Charles Dexter Cleveland based his 'Complete Concordance' to Milton's poems on Todd's verbal index, which he found full of mistakes. For the first edition the publishers paid Todd the sum of £200.

Todd's edition of The Works of Edmund Spenser (1805, 8 vols.; reproduced in 1852 and 1866) was severely reviewed by Sir Walter Scott in the Edinburgh Review, October 1805, pp. 203–17, and did not add to Todd's reputation. He also edited Johnson's Dictionary of the English Language, with "numerous corrections and the addition of several thousand words", 1818, 4 vols. This edition was often reissued, and Robert Gordon Latham's edition of Johnson's Dictionary was based on it.

Todd's original published works included:

- Some Account of the Deans of Canterbury; with a catalogue of the MSS. in the Church Library, 1793; the author afterwards printed an additional page of corrections.
- Catalogue of Books, both manuscript and printed, in the Library of Christ Church, Canterbury [anon.], 1802; 160 copies printed not for sale.
- Poetical works, with notes of various authors. To which are added illus., and some account of the life and writings of Milton (1809)
- Illustrations of Lives and Writings of Gower and Chaucer, 1810.
- 'Accomplishment of Prophecy in Jesus Christ: a Treatise by Dean Abbadie’ (edited by Todd), 1810.
- Catalogue of Manuscripts at Lambeth Palace, 1812, one hundred copies for private circulation.
- History of the College of Bonhommes at Ashridge, 1812; 2nd ed. 1823; privately printed by the Earl of Bridgewater.
- Original Sin, Free-will, and other Doctrines, as maintained by our Reformers, 1818.
- Vindication of our Authorised Translation and Translators of the Bible, 1819; 2nd ed. 1834.
- Observations on the Metrical Versions of the Psalms by Sternhold, Hopkins, and others 1822.
- Memoirs of the life and writings of the Right Rev. Brian Walton (F. C. & J. Rivington, 1821), 2 vols.
- An Account of Greek Manuscripts, chiefly biblical, which had been in the possession of the late Professor Carlyle, the greater part of which are now deposited in the Archiepiscopal Library at Lambeth Palace (1823), privately printed.
- Hints to Medical Students on a Future Life [anon.], York, 1823.
- Prayers for Family Worship, Malton (1825).
- Cranmer's Defence of the True and Catholick Doctrine of the Sacrament, with introduction vindicating his character from Lingard and others, 1825. The vindication was published separately in 1826.
- Some Account of the Life and Writings of John Milton (1826)
- Reply to Lingard's Vindication of his History of England concerning Cranmer, 1827.
- Letter to Archbishop of Canterbury on the authorship of the Icon Basilike, 1824; in reply to Christopher Wordsworth's treatise 'Who wrote Icon Basilike?' 1824. Wordsworth retorted to this pamphlet by Todd, and then came:
- Bishop Gauden, the author of the Icon Basilike, further shown in answer to Dr. Wordsworth, 1829.
- Of Confession, and Absolution, and the Secrecy of Confession, 1828.
- Life of Archbishop Cranmer, 1831, 2 vols.
- Collections relating to Benefices in the Archdeaconry of Cleveland, 1833.
- On Proposals for reviving Convocation, 2nd ed. 1837.
- Selections from Metrical Paraphrases on the Psalms, with Memoir, 1839.

Todd was also the author of sermons and charges. He contributed substantially to Edward Hasted's Kent (1798 ed. vi. 192) and the Gentleman's Magazine, and wrote a preface to Bibliotheca Reediana, 1807, the sale catalogue of Isaac Reed's library.
