= Minuscule 488 =

- New Testament manuscript
- Text: Gospels
- Date: 14th-century
- Script: Greek
- Now at: British Library
- Size: 29 cm by 21 cm
- Type: Byzantine text-type
- Category: none

Minuscule 488 (in the Gregory-Aland numbering), ε 4006 (in the Soden numbering), is a Greek minuscule manuscript of the New Testament, on paper. Palaeographically it has been assigned to the 14th century. Scrivener labeled it by number 514. Gregory it labeled twice, as 488 and number 1326 (Soden ε 488). The manuscript has complex contents with full marginalia.

== Description ==
The codex contains a complete text of the four Gospels on 124 paper leaves (29 cm by 21 cm). The text is written in one column per page, 34 lines per page (size of text 21.5 cm by 15 cm).

It contains tables of the κεφαλαια (tables of contents) before each Gospel, numbers of the κεφαλαια (chapters) at the margin, the Ammonian Sections, references to the Eusebian Canons, and lectionary markings at the margin.

Errors of itacism are very frequent and instances of ν εφελκυστικον.

== Text ==
The Greek text of the codex is a mixture of text-types with predominant the Byzantine element. Hermann von Soden classified it to the textual family K^{x}.

Aland did not place it in any Category. It was not examined by Claremont Profile Method.

== History ==
The manuscript was brought from the monastery in the Greek Archipelago to England by Carlyle (1759–1804), professor of Arabic, together with the manuscripts 470, 471, 472, 473, 474, 475, and became part of his collection. After his death in 1804 it belonged to the Lambeth Palace (1180). Charles Burney made a collation only for Mark 1:1-4:16; John 7:53-8:11, it was held in the Lambeth Palace (1223). In 1817 it returned to the Patriarch of Jerusalem.

The manuscript was added to the list of New Testament manuscripts by Scrivener, who it examined and collated. Scrivener described and collated its text in 1852.

It is currently housed at the Library of Patriarch (139) in Jerusalem.

== See also ==
- List of New Testament minuscules
- Biblical manuscript
- Textual criticism
