= Chronicle Extra =

English newspaper

- Type: Free Weekly regional newspaper
- Format: Tabloid
- Owner: Reach plc
- Headquarters: Groat Market, Newcastle upon Tyne
- Website: Chronicle Extra Live

Chronicle Extra (formerly known as The Herald and Post) is a free newspaper delivered weekly to residents in the Tyne and Wear and Northumberland area. The paper includes general news and information about that area within the last week; it also covers sports . It includes advertisements.

== Name change ==
In 2007, the owners of the paper (Trinity Mirror, now known as Reach plc) decided to rebrand The Herald and Post, as Chronicle Extra to become the sister paper of the Evening Chronicle.
