= Minuscule 473 =

- New Testament manuscript
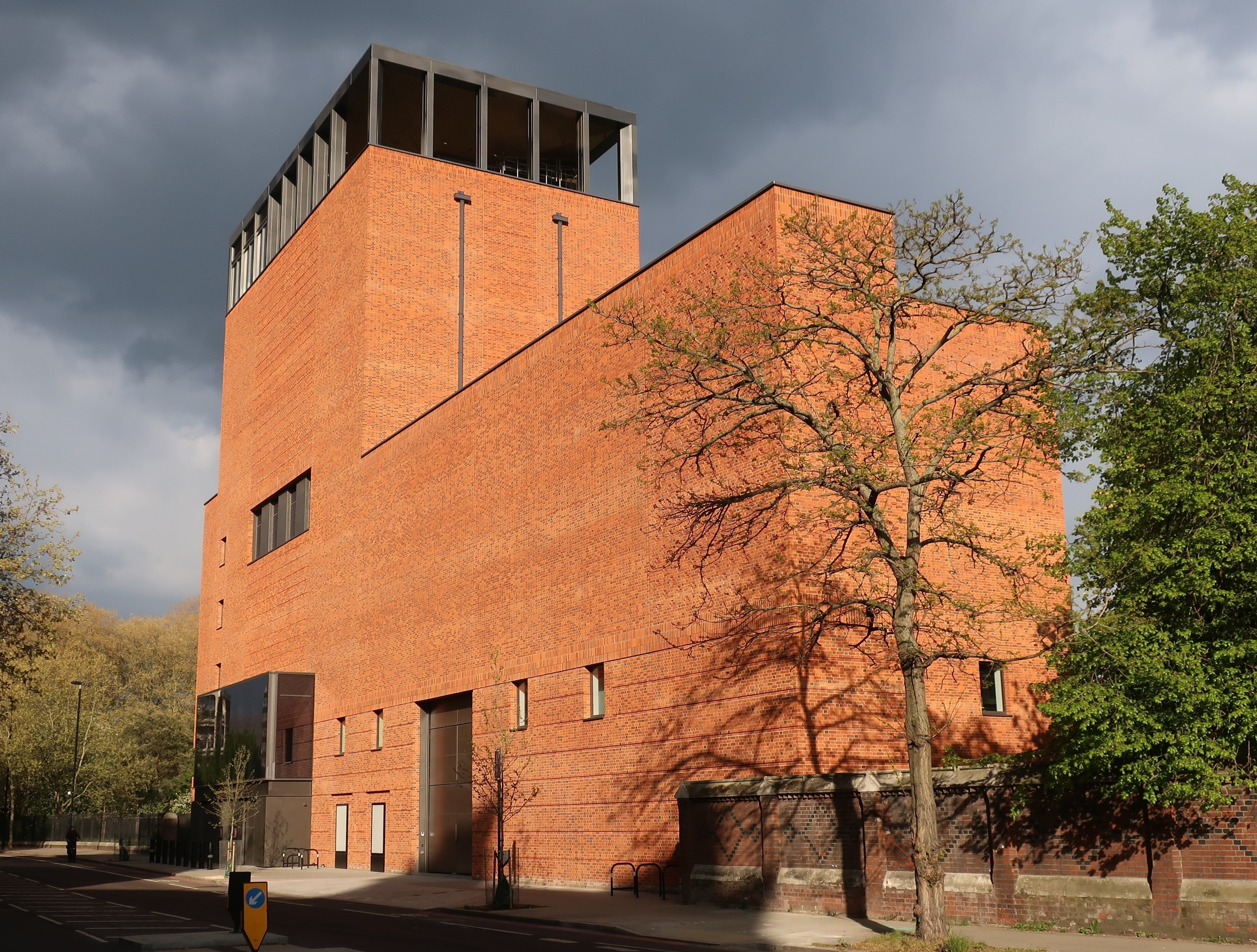
- Lambeth Palace Library, where this manuscript is housed
- Text: Gospels
- Date: 11th century
- Script: Greek
- Now at: Lambeth Palace
- Size: 28.7 cm by 23.5 cm
- Type: Byzantine text-type
- Category: V
- Note: splendidly illuminated

Minuscule 473 (in the Gregory-Aland numbering of New Testament manuscripts), α1390 (in the von Soden numbering of New Testament manuscripts), is a Greek minuscule manuscript of the New Testament, made from parchment. Using the study of comparative writing styles (palaeography), it has been assigned to the 11th century. Biblical scholar Frederick H. A. Scrivener described it as "one of the most splendid manuscripts extant" which contained "many remarkable variations" (variant readings), and labelled it by the number 512. It has liturgical books and full marginal notes.

The manuscript was originally located in the city of Constantinople, but was brought to England in the 18th century along with several other manuscripts, all of which are now in Lambeth Palace Library.

== Description ==
The manuscript is a codex (precursor to the modern book), containing the text of the four Gospels on 309 parchment leaves (size 28.7 cm by 23.5 cm), with only one gap (Matthew 1:1-8). The text is written in two columns per page, 22-24 lines per page. Illuminations are present before the Gospels of Mark, Luke, and John, in purple, red, and gold ink.

The text is divided according to the chapters (known as κεφαλαια / kephalaia), whose numbers are given in the margin, and their titles (known as τιτλοι / titloi) at the top of the pages. The text is also divided according to the smaller Ammonian Sections (240 sections in the Gospel of Mark, the last at 16:9), with references to the Eusebian Canons written below the Ammonian section numbers (both early system of dividing the four Gospels into different sections).

It contains an introduction, the tables of contents (also known as κεφαλαια) are placed before each Gospel (except for Matthew as the initial leaves of the manuscript are missing), lectionary markings in the margin (for liturgical use), the Menologion (liturgical book), and subscriptions at the end of each Gospel. The Synaxarion, another liturgical book, was added by a later hand at the end of the manuscript. According to Scrivener it is "splendidly illuminated".

== Text ==
The Greek text of the codex is considered to be a representative of the Byzantine text-type. Biblical scholar Kurt Aland placed it in Category V of his New Testament manuscript classification system.

It was classified by textual critic Hermann von Soden as I^{kc}, as a part of the third group of Family Π witnesses, along with such manuscripts as 229, 280, 482, and 1354. According to the Claremont Profile Method (a specific analysis method of textual data), it belongs to the group Π 473 in Luke 1, Luke 10, and Luke 20.

Next to the verses Luke 22:43–44 are several asterisks (this passage has been contested as to its authenticity, though asterisks needn't indicate the copyist thought so), and obeli accompany John 5:4 (another contested verse as to its authenticity).

== History ==
The manuscript was once in Constantinople, but brought from the East to England by orientalist Joseph Dacre Carlyle, professor of Arabic, together with the manuscripts 470, 471, 472, 474, 475, and 488.

The manuscript was examined by J. Farrer in 1804, Scrivener in 1852-3, and biblical scholar Caspar René Gregory saw it in 1883. Scrivener described and collated its text in 1852. The manuscript was added to the list of New Testament manuscripts by Scrivener (as 512), and in the list produced by Gregory (as 473), which is still in use.

Scrivener dated it to around the 10th or 11th century. It is currently dated by the Institute for New Testament Textual Research (INTF) to the 11th century.

It is currently housed at the Lambeth Palace (shelf number MS 1178) in London.

== See also ==
- List of New Testament minuscules
- Biblical manuscript
- Textual criticism
