= Duke Gordon =

Scottish librarian

Duke Gordon (1739–1800) was a Scottish librarian.

== Life ==
Gordon was born on 20 May 1739, the son of William Gordon, a weaver in the Potterrow, Edinburgh. His father gave him his baptismal name from a clannish feeling for the Duke of Gordon. He was educated at a school in the Cowgate, under Andrew Waddel, translator of George Buchanan's paraphrase of the Psalms. On 13 March 1753 he entered the Greek class in the University of Edinburgh under Robert Hunter, and became a good scholar.

During 1754 he was substitute teacher of the parish school of Tranent, Haddingtonshire, returning to the University on 4 March 1755. After completing his course he was tutor in the families of Captain John Dalrymple, and of Alexander Boswell, Lord Auchinleck. James Robertson DD, professor of oriental languages, on being made University Librarian (12 January 1763), appointed Gordon his assistant. This office he retained under Andrew Dalzel, Robertson's successor. His salary until 1783 was £15, and never exceeded £35; he supported himself mainly by tuition.

According to his biographer, he was a patient, sensitive scholar, not without sarcastic humour. He detected three of the six errors in the ‘immaculate’ edition of the Latin poet Horace of 1744 (see Robert Foulis). On his retirement from duty he received (12 April 1800) the degree of MA. He died unmarried on 30 December 1800, and was buried in St Cuthbert's churchyard, where a monument to his memory bears a long Latin inscription by Dalzel. He left £500 to the Edinburgh Infirmary, and the reversion of house property of nearly the same value to the poor of St Cuthbert's.
