= Minuscule 474 =

- New Testament manuscript
- Text: Gospels
- Date: 11th century
- Script: Greek
- Now at: Lambeth Palace
- Size: 22.2 cm by 17.3 cm
- Type: Byzantine text-type
- Category: V
- Hand: neatly written
- Note: bad condition

Minuscule 474 (in the Gregory-Aland numbering), α 137 (in the Soden numbering), is a Greek minuscule manuscript of the New Testament, on parchment. Palaeographically it has been assigned to the 11th century. Scrivener labeled it by number 513.

== Description ==
The codex contains the text of the four Gospels on 351 parchment leaves (size 22.2 cm by 17.3 cm), with some lacunae (Matthew 1:1-13:53; 16:28-17:18; 24:39-25:9; 26:71-27:14; Mark 8:32-9:9; John 11:9-29; 13:8-21:25). It is written in two columns per page, 24 lines per page. There is a pagination with Armenian numbers.

The text is divided according to the κεφαλαια (chapters), whose numbers are given at the margin, and the τιτλοι (titles of chapters) at the top of the pages. There is also a division according to the Ammonian Sections (in Mark 241 Sections, the last in 16:20), with references to the Eusebian Canons (written below Ammonian Section numbers).

It contains subscriptions at the end of each Gospel, and lectionary markings at the margin (for liturgical reading). It is neatly written but survived in wretched condition.

== Text ==
The Greek text of the codex is a representative of the Byzantine text-type. Aland placed it in Category V.

According to the Claremont Profile Method it represents textual family K^{x} in Luke 1, Luke 10, and Luke 20.

In Matthew 2:11 it reads ευρον for ειδον.

== History ==
F. H. A. Scrivener dated manuscript to the 10th century, C. R. Gregory to the 11th century. Currently it is dated by the INTF it to the 11th century.

The manuscript was once in the Trinity monastery at Chalke. It was brought from the East to England by Carlyle (1759–1804), professor of Arabic, together with the manuscripts 470, 471, 472, 473, 475, 488.

The manuscript was examined by J. Farrer in 1804, Scrivener, who gave the first description of it. Scrivener collated its text in 1852. The manuscript was added to the list of New Testament manuscripts by Scrivener (513) and Gregory (474). Gregory saw it in 1883.

It is currently housed at the Lambeth Palace (1179) in London.

== See also ==
- List of New Testament minuscules
- Biblical manuscript
- Textual criticism
