= Minuscule 470 =

- New Testament manuscript
- Text: Gospels
- Date: 11th century
- Script: Greek
- Now at: Lambeth Palace
- Size: 30.2 cm by 24.7 cm
- Type: Byzantine text-type
- Category: V
- Hand: beautifully written
- Note: marginalia

Minuscule 470 (in the Gregory-Aland numbering), ε 136 (in the Soden numbering), is a Greek minuscule manuscript of the New Testament, on parchment. Palaeographically it has been assigned to the 11th century. Scrivener labelled it number 509. It has marginalia.

== Description ==
The codex contains the text of the Gospels on 215 parchment leaves (size 30.2 cm by 24.7 cm), with only one lacuna (Matthew 1:1-13). The text is written in two columns per page, 23-24 lines per page.

The text is divided according to the κεφαλαια (chapters), whose numbers are given at the margin, and the τιτλοι (titles of chapters) at the top of the pages. There is also a division according to the smaller Ammonian Sections (in Mark 234 sections – the last section in 16:9), with references to the Eusebian Canons (written below Ammonian section numbers).

It contains lists of the κεφαλαια (lists of contents) before each of the Gospels, lectionary markings at the margin (for liturgical service), and subscriptions at the end of each of the Gospels.

It was beautifully written in a clear bold hand. It has breathings and accents, tolerably but not uniformly correct. The manuscript is remarkable free from the errors of itacism, or interchange of vowels (hiatus).

The nomina sacra are contracted. N ephelkystikon is not frequent. Iota adscriptum is found twice, Iota subscriptum never.

The liturgical apparatus has the larger κεφαλαια prefixed to the last three Gospels, capital letters at the commencement of the Church lessons in gold, the Ammonian Sections in the margin in red ink, and references to the Eusebian Canons in blue.

== Text ==
The Greek text of the codex is a representative of the Byzantine text-type. According to Hermann von Soden it represents the Byzantine commentated text. Aland placed it in Category V.

In the whole manuscript very few rare or noticeable readings will be found. According to Scrivener "it approaches as nearly to the received text as many of a much lower date".

Hermann von Soden included it to the textual group A^{k} (subgroup of K^{x}). According to the Claremont Profile Method it belongs to the same textual cluster as the codex 490 in Luke 1; 10; 20.

The text of the Pericope Adulterae (John 7:53-8:11) was omitted by original scribe, but was added by later hand at the end of the Gospel of John.

== History ==
Currently it is dated by the INTF to the 11th century.

According to the inscription at the end (apparently in the same hand as John 7:53-8:11), it was once at Constantinople:

επακουσον ημων ο θ̅ς̅ η ελπις παντων των περατων της γης και των εν θαλασση μακραν και ρυσαι ο θ̅ς̅ ημων την πολιν ταυτην και χωραν των χριστιανων απο λιμου λιμου [λοιμου] σισμου καταποντισμου πυρος μαχαιρας επιστιανων αλλοφιλον πολεων δαιμων (?) ημων επακουσον και ελαιησον.

The manuscript was brought from the monastery in the Greek Archipelago to England by Carlyle (1759-1804), professor of Arabic, along with the manuscripts: 206, 471, 472, 473, 474, 475, 488, 642.

It was added to the list of New Testament manuscripts by Scrivener (509) and Gregory (470).

The manuscript was examined and collated by J. Farrer of Carlisle in 1804, Scrivener, and C. R. Gregory (1883). Scrivener collated and edited its text in 1852.

It is currently housed at the Lambeth Palace (1175) in London.

== See also ==
- List of New Testament minuscules
- Biblical manuscript
- Textual criticism
