= Joseph Kinghorn =

English baptist minister (1766–1832)

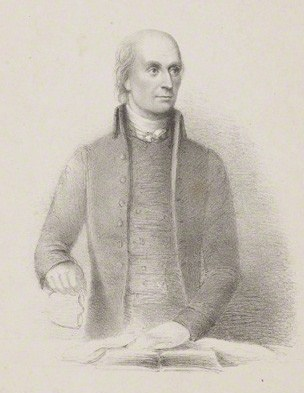
- Baptist preacher and theologian
- Born: 17 January 1766; Gateshead-on-Tyne, England
- Died: 1 September 1832 (aged 66); Norwich, England
- Education: Bristol Baptist Academy (20 August 1784–c. 1788)
- Honours: M.A., Brown University (1828)

Joseph Kinghorn (1766–1832) was an English particular Baptist and a life-long minister of St. Mary's Baptist Church in Norwich.

== Life ==
Kinghorn was born at Gateshead-on-Tyne, County Durham, on 17 January 1766. His father, David Kinghorn (3 October 1737 – 18 February 1822) was a shoemaker and Baptist preacher at Newcastle-on-Tyne, who was ordained on 1 May 1771 as minister of a Baptist congregation at Burton-Bishop, East Riding of Yorkshire, where he remained till July 1799, when he retired to Norwich. Joseph was his eldest son by his second wife, Elizabeth (d. 25 January 1810, aged 72), second daughter of Joseph Jopling of Satley.

After four years' schooling, Kinghorn was taken on trial as apprentice to watch- and clock-making at Hull in 1779, but in March 1781 became a clerk in the white-lead works at Elswick, Northumberland of Walker Fishwick & Co. On 20 April 1783 he was baptised by his father at Burton-Bishop, and considered entering the ministry. He made the acquaintance of Robert Hall, and had thoughts of joining him at the University of Aberdeen, but on 20 August 1784 he entered Bristol Baptist Academy, under Caleb Evans. At Bristol, Kinghorn developed friendships with James Hinton (1761–1823), Anthony Robinson (Unitarian) (1762–1827, his roommate), and Samuel Pearce.

On leaving the academy, Kinghorn ministered for some months (from May 1788) at Fairford, Gloucestershire. He received an invitation to Norwich, because of a business connection between Richard Fishwick who worked at his old firm, and Thomas Hawkins, both Baptists, Hawkins belonging to the congregation at St. Mary's Chapel, Norwich. On 27 March 1789 he settled in Norwich, and was ordained on 20 May 1790.

Kinghorn was famed for his preaching, which was noticed by Edward Irving. On the liberal side in his politics, though a moderate, he did not bring them into his public discourses. William Wilkin Wilkin (1762–1799) of his congregation was a personal friend, as well as a radical. When Wilkin died in 1799, Kinghorn brought up and educated his son Simon Wilkin.

From 1790 Kinghorn was a member of the Norwich Speculative Society, entering the intellectual life of the city, of which William Taylor was the effective leader. He defended Christianity at the Tusculan School, another debating club, in 1794, where he was strongly opposed by Charles Marsh.

In 1804 Kinghorn was invited to become head of the Northern Baptist Academy, then being set up in Bradford, but he preferred pastoral work. His old chapel was replaced in 1811 by a new structure on the same site. In a controversy with Robert Hall, which began in 1816, Kinghorn took the side of close communion, requiring adult baptism a condition of participation in the Lord's Supper. He made mission journeys to Scotland in 1818 and 1822.

In later life Kinghorn devoted much time to Hebrew and rabbinical studies. He died unmarried on 1 September 1832, and was buried on 7 September in the vestibule of St. Mary's Chapel. Joseph John Gurney spoke at his funeral, where the sermon was preached by John Alexander, minister of Prince's Street congregational church.

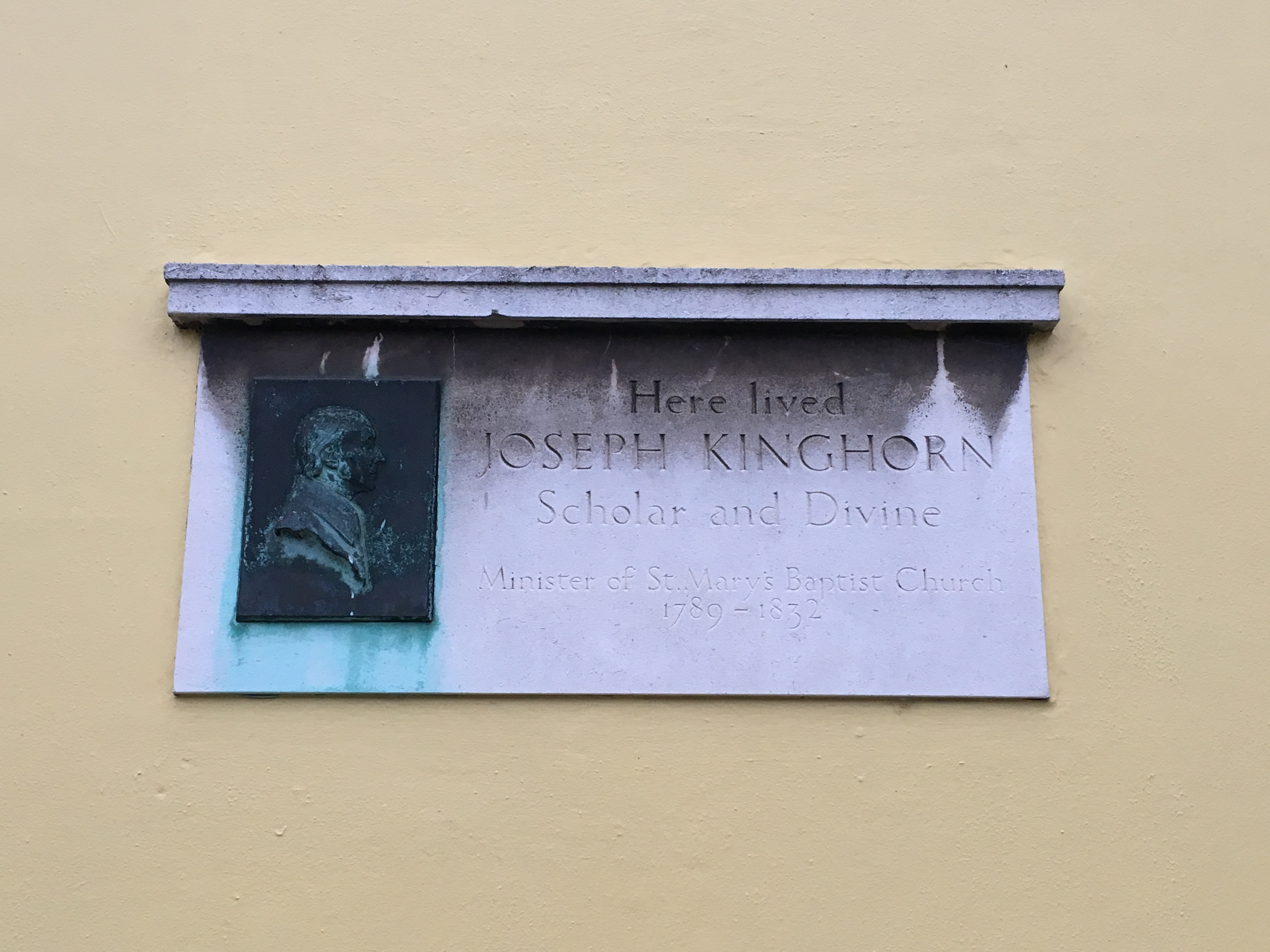
A profile bust-length portrait of Joseph Kinghorn, in his late forties, is set to the left of the panel with the inscription. Image probably based on three-quarter portrait by A. Robertson, engraved by W. Bond used as frontispiece of M.H. Wilkin, Joseph Kinghorn, a Memoir, Norwich, 1855, by where he is shown in his mid to late twenties. Roundel signed: H.A. Miller 1930 (bottom left) . This plaque is found at Pottergate Street, Norwich.

== Works ==
A list of 20 of Kinghorn's publications was given by Martin Hood Wilkin, including:

- Address to a friend, who intends entering into church communion. Norwich, 1803 (1st ed.), 1813 (2nd ed.).
- An Address to a Friend, on Church Communion: With An Appendix, Containing a Brief Statement of the Sentiments of the Baptists on the Ordinance of Baptism. Norwich, 1824 (3rd ed.).
- Advice and Encouragement to Young Ministers. Two Sermons addressed principally to the students of the two Baptist academies at Stepheny and at Bristol. The First Preached June 23, 1814, at the Rev. Dr. Rippon’s Meeting, Carter-lane, Southwark; The Second, August 3, 1814, at the Rev. Dr. Ryland’s, Broad Mead, Bristol. Norwich, 1814.
- Arguments Against the Practice of Mixed Communion, and in Support of Communion on the Plan of the Apostolic Church; With Preliminary Observations on Rev. R. Hall’s Reasons for Christian, in Opposition to Party Communion. London, 1827.
- Arguments, Chiefly from Scripture, Against the Roman Catholic Doctrine. In a Dialogue. Norwich, [1804].
- The Arguments in Support of Infant Baptism, from the Covenant of Circumcision, Examined, and Shewn to Be Invalid. London, [1823].
- Baptism, a Term of Communion at the Lord’s Supper. 1st ed., Norwich, [1816]; 2nd ed., Norwich, 1816.
- A Brief Statement of the Sentiments of the Baptists on the Ordinance of Baptism. Norwich; London, 1824.
- A Defence of “Baptism a Term of Communion.” In Answer to the Rev. Robert Hall’s Reply. Norwich, 1820.
- A Defence of Infant Baptism, Its Best Confutation: Being A Reply to Mr. Peter Edwards’s Candid Reasons for Renouncing the Principles of Anti-paedo-baptism, on his own ground. Norwich, 1795.
- Fifth Report of the Committee of the Norfolk and Norwich Auxiliary Bible Society. 1 September 1816. Norwich, 1816.
- The Miracles of Jesus not Performed by the Power of the Shem-Hamphorash. The Substance of a Sermon Preached at the Jews’ Chapel, August 18, 1811, Being the Seventh Demonstration Sermon… With an Appendix on Jewish Traditions and the Perpetuity of the Law of Moses. London: The London Society for Promoting Christianity Among the Jews, 1812.
- Practical Cautions to Students and Young Ministers. The Substance of a Sermon Preached at Bradford, in the County of York; At the Annual Meeting of the Northern Baptist Education Society, August 27, 1817. Norwich, 1817.
- Public Worship Considered and Enforced. Norwich, 1800.
- Remarks on a “Country Clergyman’s Attempt to Explain the Nature of the Visible Church, the Divine Commission of the Clergy, &c.” Being a Defence of Dissenters in General, and of Baptists in Particular; on New Testament Principles. Norwich, 1829.
- "The Separate State [1831]". In The British Preacher, Under the Sanction of the Ministers Whose Discourses Appear in Its Pages, I: 217–230. London: Frederick Westley and A. H. Davis, 1831.
- Scriptural Arguments for the Divinity of Christ, Addressed to the Serious Professors of Christianity. Norwich, 1813. Second Edition. With an Appendix, Containing Observations on the Rev. I. Perry’s Letters to the Author. Norwich, [1814].
- Serious Considerations Addressed to the House of Israel. The Substance of a Sermon, Delivered at the Jews’ Chapel, December 16, 1810. London: The London Society for Promoting Christianity Among the Jews, 1811.
- Sketch of the Life of the Rev. Isaac Slee; With an Extract from His Farewell Sermon, on His Resigning the Perpetual Curacy of Plumpton, in Cumberland, in Consequence of Becoming a Baptist. London: Wightman and Cramp, 1827.
- James Robertson. Clavis Pentateuchi: Sive Analysis Omnium Vocum Hebraicarum suo ordine in Pentateucho Moseos occurrentium, una cum versione Latina et Anglica; Notis Criticis et Philologicis Adjectis, in quibus, ex lingua Arabica, Judæorum Moribus, et Doctorum Itinerariis, plurium locorum S. S. Sensus Eruitur, novaque versione illustrator. In usum Juventutis Academicæ Edinburgenæ. Cui Præmittuntur Dissertationes Duæ; I. De antiquitate linguæ Arabicæ, ejusque conventientia cu, lingua Hebræa. II. De genuina punctorum vocalium antiquitate. Edited by Joseph Kinghorn. Norwich, 1824.

Kinghorn also edited the 9th (1814) and 10th (1827) editions of John Ash and Caleb Evans's Collection of Hymns (1769). A catalogue of his library was published at Norwich, 1833.

== Notes ==
Attribution

This article incorporates text from a publication now in the public domain: Lee, Sidney, ed. (1892). "Kinghorn, Joseph". Dictionary of National Biography. Vol. 31. London: Smith, Elder & Co.
