= Minuscule 475 =

- New Testament manuscript
- Text: Gospels
- Date: 11th century
- Script: Greek
- Now at: Lambeth Palace
- Size: 20.4 cm by 15.5 cm
- Type: Byzantine text-type
- Category: V
- Hand: beautifully written
- Note: marginalia

Minuscule 475 (in the Gregory-Aland numbering), α 138 (in the Soden numbering), is a Greek minuscule manuscript of the New Testament, on parchment. Palaeographically it has been assigned to the 11th century. Scrivener labelled it number 515. It has full marginalia.

== Description ==
The codex contains the text of the Gospels on 272 parchment leaves (size 20.4 cm by 15.5 cm), with some lacunae (John 16:8-22). Other lacunae (Mark 3:6-21; Luke 12:48-12:2; John 18:27-21:25) were supplied on coarse cotton paper by a rude and later hand, perhaps from 14th or 15th century. According to Scrivener the supplied texts were very carelessly written. The text is written in one column per page, 21-24 lines per page.

The text is divided according to the κεφαλαια (chapters), whose numbers are given at the margin, and the τιτλοι (titles of chapters) at the margin. There is also a division according to the Ammonian Sections (in Mark 233 Sections – the last section 16:8), with references to the Eusebian Canons (written below Ammonian section numbers).

The capital letters and Ammonian Section numbers are in red, references to the Eusebian Canons in blue or green.

It contains tables of the κεφαλαια (tables of contents) before three of the Gospels (those of Matthew were lost), lectionary markings at the margin (for liturgical use), versification, and pictures. It is beautifully written but tampered by a later hand.

There is no iota subscriptum, but iota adscriptum occurs 21 times. In Luke 19:39 and Luke 22:70 occurs grammar form ειπαν. Fragments supplied by a later hand contain more itacisms than the manuscript itself. It has N ephelkystikon.

== Text ==
The Greek text of the codex is a representative of the Byzantine text-type. Hermann von Soden classified it to the textual family K^{x}. Aland placed it in Category V.

According to the Claremont Profile Method it represents textual family K^{x} in Luke 1. In Luke 10 and Luke 20 it belongs to the textual cluster 475.

In Luke 19-20 it has very good text, very close to the codex Sangallensis, and other old Uncials.

It has some rare readings in Matthew 1:20; 27:33; Mark 10:17; 15:7; Luke 1:34; 14:12.22.27; 15:7; 16:2; 18:6.39; 19:2.46; 20:3.4.12.24.25.28.31.38.47; 21:22.27; 22:17.46.47.56.68; 23:27.38.53; John 6:58.70; 10:23.

== History ==
F. H. A. Scrivener dated the manuscript to the 13th century, C. R. Gregory dated it to the 11th century. Currently it is dated by the INTF to the 11th century.

The manuscript was once in Constantinople. It was brought from the East to England by Carlyle (1759-1804), professor of Arabic, from Syria, along with the manuscripts 470, 471, 472, 473, 474, 488.

The manuscript was examined by J. Farrer in 1804, Bloomfield, Scrivener, and Gregory. Scrivener collated and published its text in 1852. The manuscript was added to the list of New Testament manuscripts by Scrivener (515) and Gregory (475). Gregory saw it in 1883.

It is currently housed at the Lambeth Palace (1192) in London.

== See also ==
- List of New Testament minuscules
- Biblical manuscript
- Textual criticism
