= Sunday Sun =

British newspaper

The Sunday Sun
- Type: Weekly newspaper
- Format: Tabloid
- Owner(s): Reach plc
- Editor: None specified
- Founded: 1919
- Political alignment: Apolitical
- Headquarters: Groat Market, Newcastle upon Tyne
- Circulation: 4,454 (as of 2024)
- Website: sundaysun.co.uk

The Sunday Sun is a regional Sunday newspaper on sale in North East England, Cumbria and the Scottish Borders, published in Newcastle Upon Tyne by Reach plc. First published on 31 August 1919 as The Sunday Sun, the name was changed to the Sunday Sun between 1954 and 1967.

It is the sister paper of the weekday newspapers the Evening Chronicle and The Journal. It is unconnected to national newspaper The Sun, whose Sunday edition is The Sun on Sunday, launched in 2012.

In 2002, owners NCJ were successfully sued by Jimmy Nail for publishing allegations relating to the actor's behaviour during the filming of the third series of Auf Wiedersehen, Pet.

Since October 2013, the Chronicle, Journal and Sunday Sun have been banned from Newcastle United F.C. due to the papers' coverage of a fans' protest march.

Until 2018 the title was edited by Matt McKenzie.
