= John Cunningham (poet and dramatist) =

Dublin-born playwright, poet and actor

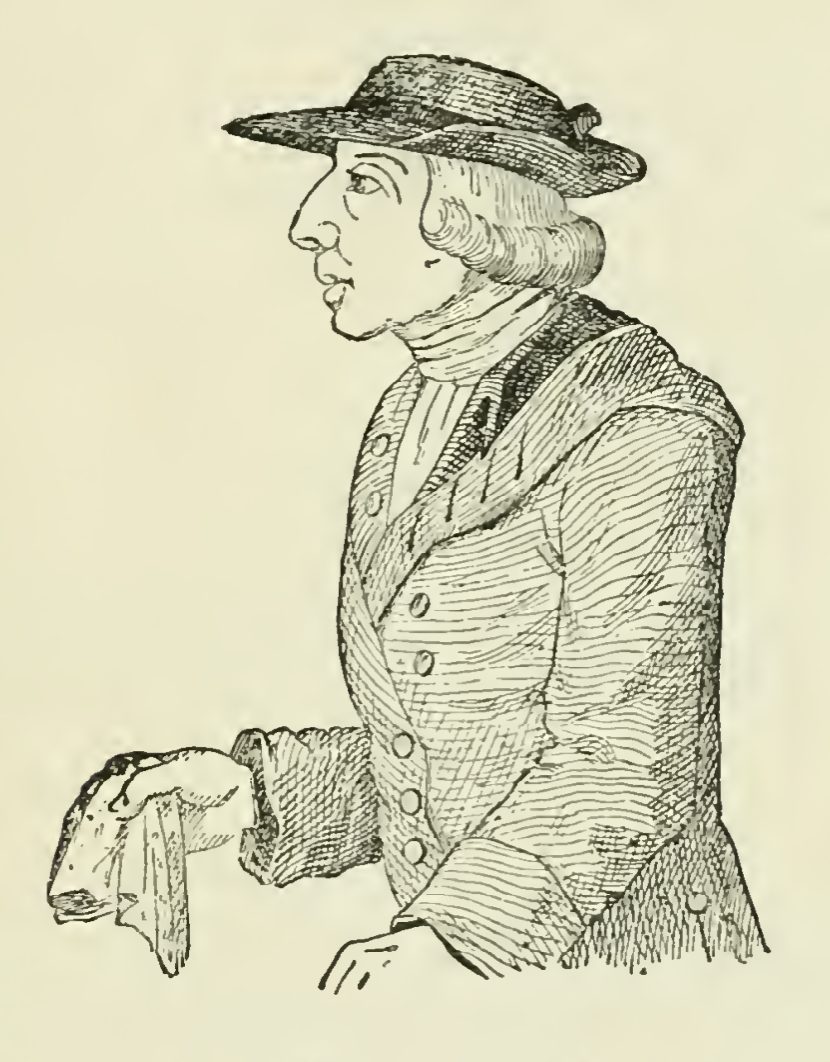
John Cunningham

John Cunningham (1729–1773) was a Dublin-born playwright, poet and actor, who spent much of his life in, and according to Thomas Allan, "whose name and fame will for ever be identified with Newcastle."

== Life ==
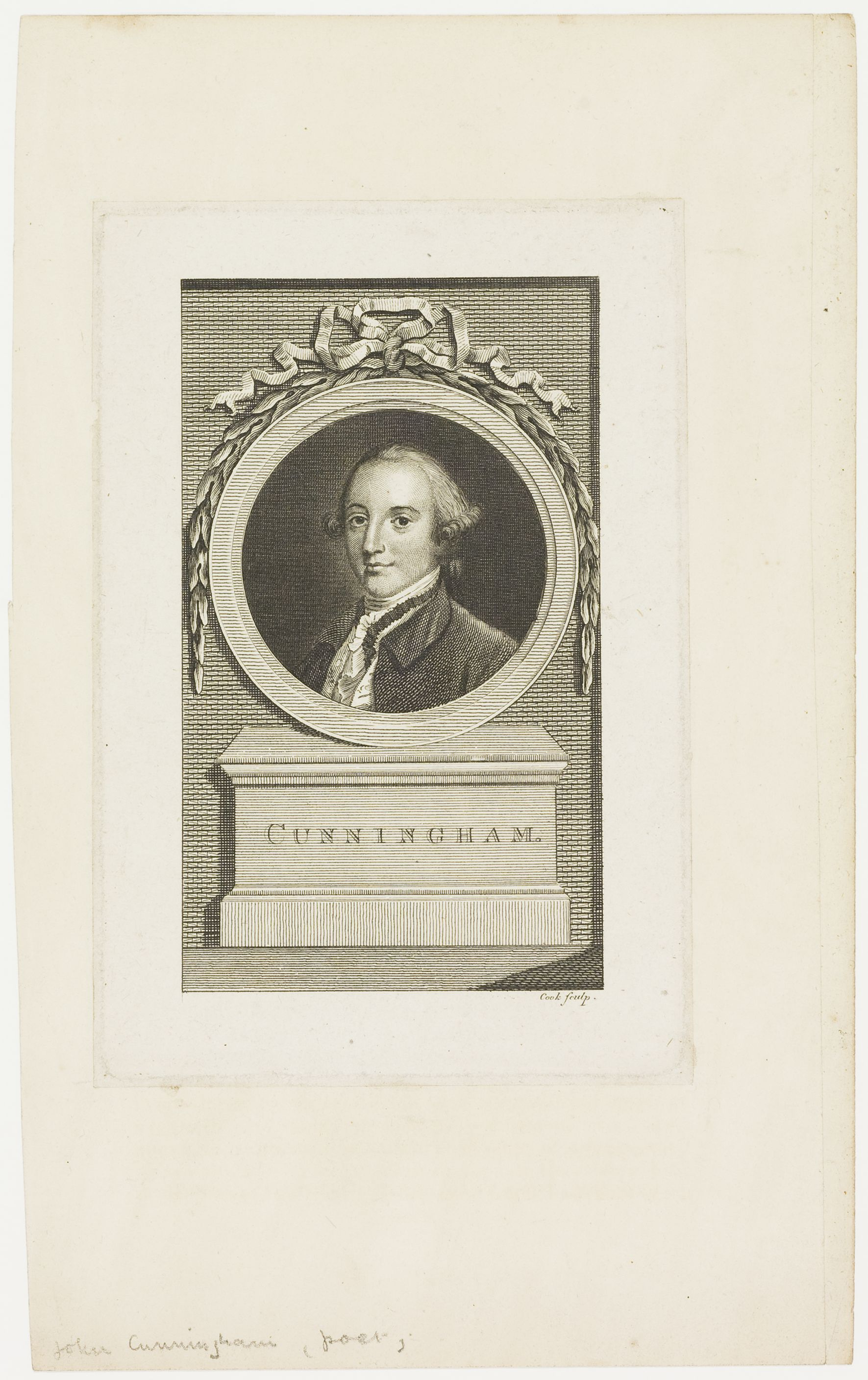
Cunningham

John Cunningham was born in 1729 in Dublin, Ireland. His parents, who were of Scottish descent, had won a lottery, risen up the social ladder, become bankrupt, and moved back down the social ladder. His brother was the sculptor, Patrick Cunningham.

John went to Drogheda Grammar School, Drogheda, but had to leave when his father's wealth disappeared. Early in life he was attracted to the stage and the acting profession. As an actor, he never achieved any distinction, for in figure, voice, and temperament he was quite unfitted for such a profession.

He started to write in the age of twelve and at the age of 17 wrote his first drama, Love in a Mist, which was performed in Dublin. Afterwards he performed at various places, with but indifferent success, amongst others, at York, Newcastle, Alnwick, Sunderland and Edinburgh. While gaining his living, as an actor, he still continued to write poetry. It was at Edinburgh that he first came to notice as a poet, and on leaving it he returned to Newcastle, where he had previously made his headquarters while playing in the North of England.

He lived for the remainder of his life, writing poems, and playing wherever he could get an engagement in the vicinity. His earnings were scanty, but his wants were few, and his amiable, simple character, and poetic talent, made him many friends. The best and truest were Mr and Mrs Thomas Slack. Slack was a bookseller, and publisher of the Newcastle Chronicle. Cunningham supplemented his income by writing articles for publication.

After befriending the poor poet in many ways, Slack at length took him home to his house. Cunningham was then almost worn out, but his benefactor paid him every attention that his state required. Writing to a friend, the poet says of Slack:

"His Bounty proceeds from his heart,
Tis principle prompts the supply;
His friendship exceeds my desert,
And often suppresses a sigh."

== Death ==
John Cunningham gave his last performance as an actor in Darlington on 20 June 1773. He returned to Newcastle upon Tyne, was taken ill, and died on 18 September 1773 at the age of 44, at his lodgings in Union Street, Newcastle.

He was buried in the churchyard of St John the Baptist Church, Newcastle upon Tyne, a table monument being placed at his grave by Mr Slack, of the Newcastle Chronicle. This monument was restored in 1887 by public subscription, after falling into decay. The inscription on it reads:

Here lie the Remains of
JOHN CUNNINGHAM
Of his excellence
As a Pastoral Poet
His works will remain a monument
for ages
After this temporary Tribute of Esteem
Is in dust forgotten.
He died in Newcastle Sep. 18, 1773,
Aged 44.

In 1891 Joseph Cowen, proprietor of The Chronicle, placed a window in St John's Church in his memory.

== Works ==
The poetry of Cunningham is all written in a quiet, lifted strain. Some of his descriptions of natural scenery are very true and very pleasing in their simplicity; there is much tenderness and grace in his pastorals, but he never rises into passion, or allows himself to be carried away by poetic enthusiasm. There is more fire, perhaps, in his eulogy of "Newcastle Beer" than in most of his other compositions. The theme may, to some, appear unworthy of a poet's efforts, but it must be remembered that in Cunningham's days Newcastle beer was a great institution, and the great ones of the town did not disdain on occasions to indulge in the local nectar. Often were their servants sent round to see where the beer was in best condition (each house brewed its own then), and acting on their reports, the masters would patronise mine host who had the best on tap.

His works include the following :-
The play – Love in a mist
A book of Poems – published 1766

Extract from an Elegy on a pile of Ruins
Search where Ambition raged with rigour steeled
Where Slaughter like the rapid lightning ran
And say, while memory weeps the blood-stained field
Where lies the chief? And where the common man?
Newcastle Beer – A lyrical poem with classical illusions, aimed at the moneyed class
Holiday Gown
