= The Journal (Newcastle upon Tyne) =

British daily newspaper

- Type: Daily newspaper
- Owner(s): Reach plc
- Editor: Darren Thwaites
- Founded: 1832
- Headquarters: Groat Market, Newcastle upon Tyne
- Circulation: 2,273 (as of 2024)
- ISSN: 0307-3645
- Website: chroniclelive.co.uk

The Journal is a daily newspaper produced in Newcastle upon Tyne. Published by ncjMedia, a division of Reach plc, The Journal is produced every weekday and Saturday morning and is complemented by its sister publications the Evening Chronicle and the Sunday Sun.

The newspaper mainly has a middle-class and professional readership throughout North East England, covering a mixture of regional, national and international news. It also has a daily business section and sports page as well as the monthly Culture magazine and weekly property supplement Homemaker.

News coverage about farming is also an important part of the paper with a high readership in rural Northumberland.

It was the named sponsor of Tyne Theatre on Westgate Road during the 2000s, until January 2012.

The first edition of the Newcastle Journal was printed on 12 May 1832, and subsequent Saturdays, by Hernaman and Perring, 69 Pilgrim Street, Newcastle. On 12 May 2007, The Journal celebrated its 175th anniversary and 49,584th issue.

The Journal was named North East Newspaper of the Year in 2007 and 2008 at the Tom Cordner North East Press Awards and Newspaper of the Year nationally in its category in 2013 and 2014.

== Newcastle United FC ban ==
In October 2013, the Chronicle, Journal and Sunday Sun were banned from Newcastle United F.C. for over a year due to the papers' coverage of a fans' protest march.

== Former journalists ==
- Brian McNally (1948-2024), sports reporter known as 'The Beast'
