= Minuscule 472 =

- New Testament manuscript
- Text: Gospels
- Date: 13th century
- Script: Greek
- Now at: Lambeth Palace
- Size: 19.4 cm by 14.5 cm
- Type: mixed
- Category: none
- Hand: ill written

Minuscule 472 is a Greek minuscule manuscript of the New Testament Gospels, written on parchment. It is designated by the siglum 472 in the Gregory-Aland numbering of New Testament manuscripts, and as α 1386 in the Soden numbering of New Testament manuscripts. Using the study of comparative writing styles (palaeography), it has been assigned to the 13th century. Biblical scholar and textual critic Frederick H. A. Scrivener labelled it by number 511.

== Description ==
The manuscript is a codex (the precursor to the modern book), containing the text of the four Gospels on 210 parchment leaves (sized 19.4 cm by 14.5 cm), with numerous gaps. It is missing Matthew 4:1-7:6; 20:21-21:12; Luke 4:29-5:1; 5:17-33; 16:24-17:13; 20:19-41; John 6:51-8:2; 12:20-40; 14:27-15:13; 17:6-18:2; 18:37-19:14). The text is written in one column per page, 17-25 lines per page.

The text is divided according to the chapters (known as κεφαλαια / kephalaia), whose numbers are given in the margin, and the chapter titles (known as τιτλοι / titloi) at the top of the pages. There is also a division according to the Ammonian Sections (there are 235 in Mark, with the last section in 16:14), with references to the Eusebian Canons (an early system of dividing the four Gospels into different sections) which are written below the Ammonian Section numbers.

It contains the tables of contents (also known as κεφαλαια) before Luke and John, lectionary markings at the margin, the liturgical book known as the Synaxarion (a list of saint's days), however due to what appears to be several missing leaves at the end, the Menologion (a list of readings to be read each calendar month) is not extant. There are subscriptions at the end of each Gospel which contain the number of lines (known as στιχοι / stichoi). Some disputed passages are marked by an obelus in the margin.

Several copyists were used in the writing of the manuscript. According to Scrivener it was "shamefully ill written, torn and much mutilated", but it has "valuable readings by far the most important at Lambeth". According to him the handwriting is a "miserable scrawl" written on "the coarsest parchment".

== Text ==
The Greek text of the codex is mixed. Textual critic Kurt Aland did not place it in any of his categories of New Testament manuscripts.

According to the Claremont Profile Method (a specific analysis method of textual data), it has a mixed text in Luke 1 and Luke 20 (fragmentary). It has a mixture of Byzantine families in Luke 10. It also belongs to the textual cluster 1009.

The passages of Luke 23:39-41 and John 6:4 are marked as doubtful.

== History ==
The earliest history of the manuscript is unkknown. It was once in Constantinople, but was brought from the East to England by Joseph Dacre Carlyle (1759-1804), professor of Arabic, together with the manuscripts minuscule 470, 471, 473, 474, 475, and 488.

The manuscript was examined by J. Farrer in 1804, along with scholars Burney, Scrivener, and biblical scholar Caspar René Gregory in later years. Scrivener collated and published its text in 1853. The manuscript was added to the list of New Testament manuscripts by Scrivener. Burney noticed: "Mendis erratisque ita scatet, ut scriptorum imperitiae et oscitantiae luculentissimum fiat argumentum" (Mistakes and errors abound in such a way that it becomes the clearest evidence of the writers' incompetence and sloppiness). This opinion was supported by Scrivener: "I certainly never met with a copy of the Gospels written with such irreverent and scandalous negligence, but this is only one instance out of a thousand of the danger of judging hastily from first appearances".

Scrivener dated the manuscript to the 12th century. Gregory dated it to the 13th-15th century. It is currently dated by the INTF to the 13th century. It is currently housed at the Lambeth Palace (shelf mark 1177) in London.

== See also ==
- List of New Testament minuscules
- Biblical manuscript
- Textual criticism
