= Joseph Dacre Carlyle =

English orientalist, 1758–1804

Rev Joseph Dacre Carlyle FRSE (4 June 1758 – 12 April 1804) was an English orientalist. He gained church preferment and travelled widely. Carlyle worked with Sarah Hodgson to create a version of the Old Testament printed in Arabic.

== Life ==
Joseph Dacre Carlyle was born in Carlisle, Cumberland, where his father George Carlyle served as a physician. He was educated at Carlisle grammar school, then Kirkby Lonsdale School, before being accepted by Christ's College, Cambridge. He moved shortly to Queens' College. He proceeded B.A. in 1779, and was elected a fellow of Queens', took his M.A, degree in 1783, and B.D. in 1793. During his residence at Cambridge he studied with David Zamio (Europeanised name) from Baghdad. He was appointed Sir Thomas Adams's Professor of Arabic when William Craven resigned in 1796.

Meanwhile he had obtained some church preferment at Carlisle, becoming chancellor of the diocese in 1793. In 1792 he published Rerum Ægyptiacarum Annales, translated from the Arabic of Ibn Taghribirdi, and in 1796 Specimens of Arabian Poetry, translations with some details of the authors selected.

In 1799, Carlyle was appointed chaplain to Lord Elgin's mission to Constantinople, with the special scholarly duties of learned referee. He made a tour through Asia Minor, Palestine, Greece, and Italy, collecting Greek and Syriac manuscripts for a proposed new version of the New Testament.

Returning to England in September 1801, Carlyle was presented the living of Newcastle-on-Tyne. Carlisle worked with Sarah Hodgson to create a printed version of the Old Testament in Arabic. Carlyle's health was poor, and he died after an illness on 13 April 1804.

== Works ==
Carlyle's Poems suggested chiefly by Scenes in Asia Minor, Syria and Greece, together with some translations from the Arabic, were published after his death, 1805, with extracts from his journal and a preface after them. Meanwhile he had almost completed an account of his tour through the Troad, which was never published. His complete Arabic Bible, revised from Walton's text, was published by Sarah Hodgson at Newcastle, edited by Henry Ford, professor of Arabic at Oxford, in 1811.

== Some manuscripts from Carlyle's collection ==
- Minuscule 470
- Minuscule 471
- Minuscule 472
- Minuscule 473
- Minuscule 474
- Minuscule 475
- Minuscule 488
- Lectionary 232
