= James Robertson (orientalist) =

James Robertson FRSE (1714–1795) was a Scottish orientalist. In 1783 he was a founding Fellow of the Royal Society of Edinburgh.

== Life ==
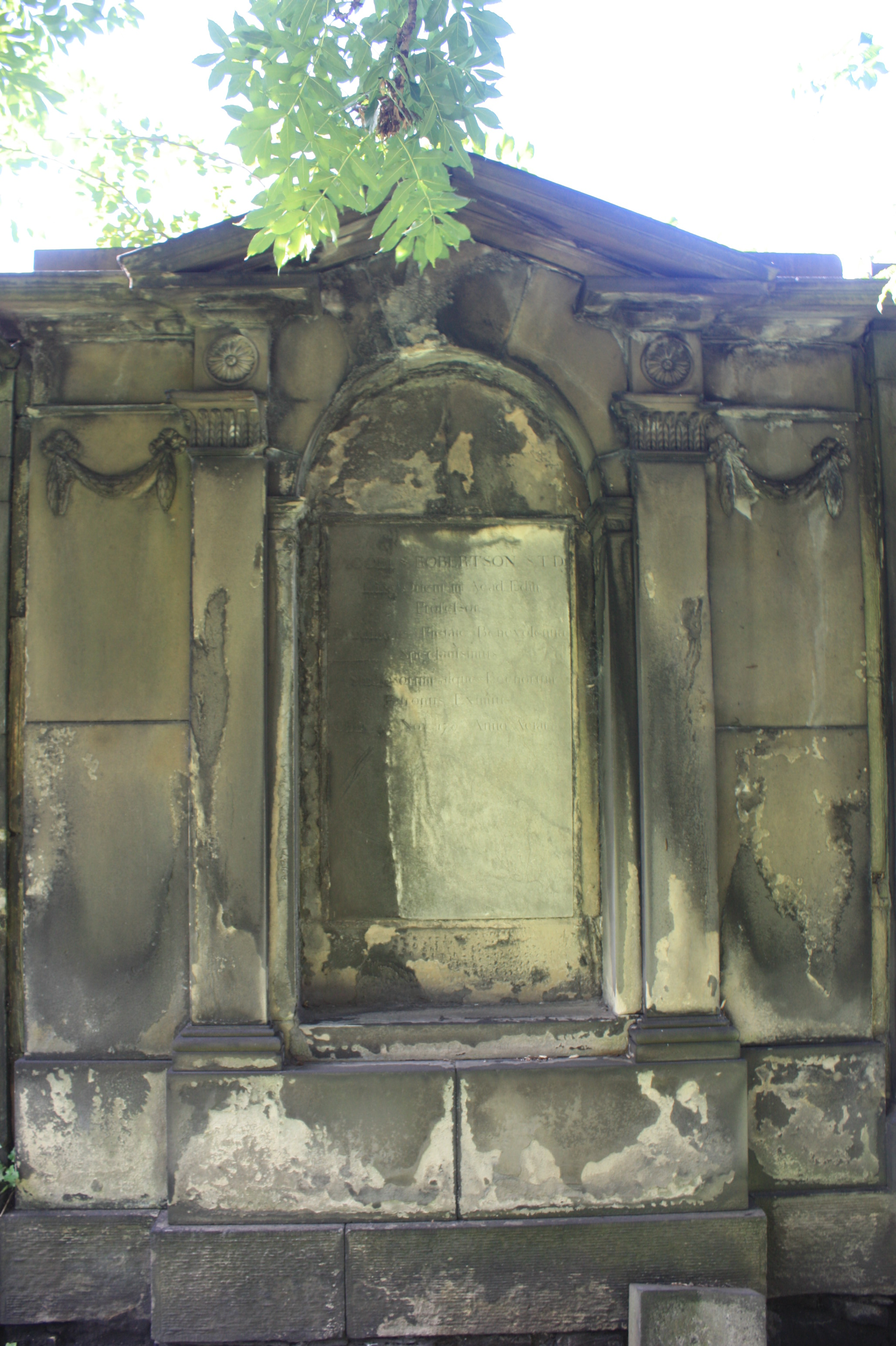
The grave of Prof James Robertson, St Cuthbert's Churchyard, Edinburgh

Born in the parish of Cromarty, Robertson studied for many years at Leyden University under Jan Jacob Schultens then at Oxford University under Prof Hunt. He was called to his native parish as minister, having been licensed by the Presbytery of Edinburgh as a Church of Scotland minister on 28 November 1744. He did not remain at Cromarty, but, after graduating at Leyden on 20 January 1749, proceeded to Oxford to study under Thomas Hunt.

Robertson was offered an post in Philip Doddridge's Northampton Academy; but the town council of Edinburgh, in response to its divinity students, elected him on 26 June 1751 as Professor of Hebrew and Semitic Languages in the University of Edinburgh. He received the fees of students only, his predecessor William Dawson retaining the salary for life. Robertson became librarian in 1763, appointing Duke Gordon as assistant. His colleagues and students nicknamed him "The Rabbi". Dr Samuel Johnson visited him in August 1773 and was "much pleased with his conversation".

He retired in 1785. Infirm during the last few years of his life, Robertson died at Middlefield, Leith Walk, on 26 November 1795. He is buried in St Cuthberts Churchyard at the west end of Princes Street. The grave lies on the main dividing wall immediately north of the church.

== Works ==
Robertson wrote:

- The Resemblance of Jesus to Moses considered, Edinburgh, 1765.
- Poems, Consisting of Tales, Fables, Epigrams, &c. &c. (as "Nobody") (1770) - subsequent editions under his own name [this should be deleted from this page - these poems were by the actor-manager James Robertson, born in Dublin 1714, died York 1795].
- Clavis Pentateuchi, Edinburgh, 1770. This is a learned analysis of the Torah, printed in Latin and English. Two dissertations are prefixed: on the Arabic language and on the vowel points. A second edition, by Joseph Kinghorn, was published at Norwich in 1824.
- Grammatica Linguæ Hebrææ, Edinburgh, 1758; Second edition Edinburgh, 1783.

== Notes ==
Attribution

This article incorporates text from a publication now in the public domain: Lee, Sidney, ed. (1896). "Robertson, James (1714-1795)". Dictionary of National Biography. Vol. 48. London: Smith, Elder & Co.
