= Francis Britius =

Francis Britius was a seventeenth-century orientalist and a monk at Rennes in Brittany. The precise dates of his birth and death are unknown.

Britius entered the Capuchin Order and spent the early years of his religious life in missionary work in the Levant, where he devoted himself with special zeal to the study of Oriental languages. His proficiency in these languages soon came to the notice of his superiors, and, being summoned to Rome, he was employed by the Congregation of the Propagation of the Faith in the translation of several important works into Arabic. The first great fruit of his labors in this field was an abridged translation of Baronius' Annales ecclesiastici. The work was published at Rome in three volumes quarto, the first of which appeared in 1653, the second in 1655, and the third in 1671. Britius had also much to do with a translation of the Bible into Arabic, giving the Vulgate text in parallel columns, which was published by Mazari, at Rome, in 1671 (3 vols. fol.)

Practically the entire edition of both translations was sent to the East for use in the work of missions.
