= Sarah Hodgson =

English newspaper proprietor (c.1760–1822)

- Born: bapt. 1760
- Died: 10 September 1822; Newcastle upon Tyne
- Spouse: Solomon Hodgson

Sarah Hodgson (bapt. 1760 – 10 September 1822) was an English printer and newspaper proprietor. Her parents started the Newcastle Chronicle and it was left to her. She is credited with reinvigorating her newspaper and her printing business in Newcastle upon Tyne. She published The Holy Bible in Arabic in 1811.

== Life ==
She was baptised in 1760. Her parents were the writer and grammarian Ann Fisher and the publisher Thomas Slack.

The Newcastle Chronicle was founded in 1764 as a weekly newspaper by her parents Thomas Slack and Ann Fisher. The paper was left to her in 1785. Her husband Solomon Hodgson sold the book printing part of the business to his brother-in-law. In 1800 her husband died and Hodgson committed herself to reestablishing ownership. She bought back the part of the business that had been sold and infused the business with new vigour.

Around 1803 Hodgson began printing an Arabic version of the Old Testament. The text had been made by Joseph Dacre Carlyle who had moved to Newcastle. The type had been created by Charles Wilkins and George Nicol. Carlyle died in the following year, but in 1811 she published "The Holy Bible, containing the Old and New Testaments, in the Arabic language".

Hodgson died in Newcastle of cholera. Her funeral was at the Hanover Square Chapel conducted by Reverend William Turner.

== Associated publications ==
- Ladies' Own Memorandum-Book (created by her mother) published annually in London
- The Holy Bible, containing the Old and new testaments, in the Arabic language

Select Fables; With Cuts, Designed And Engraved By Thomas And John Bewick, And Others, Previous To The Year 1784: Together With A Memoir; and a descriptive Catalogue Of The Works Of Messrs. Bewick. - Newcastle:: [1820]
