= Evening Chronicle =

Daily newspaper produced in Newcastle upon Tyne

- Type: Daily newspaper
- Format: Tabloid
- Owner: Reach plc
- Editor: Helen Dalby
- Founded: 1858
- Headquarters: Eldon Court; Percy Street; Newcastle upon Tyne
- Circulation: 4,762 (as of 2026)
- Website: chroniclelive.co.uk

The Evening Chronicle, now referred to in print as The Chronicle, is a daily newspaper produced in Newcastle upon Tyne covering North regional news, but primarily focused on Newcastle upon Tyne and surrounding area. The Evening Chronicle is published by njcMedia, a division of Reach plc.

== History ==
The Chronicle originated as the Newcastle Chronicle, founded in 1764 as a weekly newspaper by Thomas Stack and Ann Fisher. The paper was left to their daughter, Sarah Hodgson, in 1785. In 1794 her husband, Solomon Hodgson, sold a part of the business to his brother-in-law. In 1800 Solomon died and Sarah Hodgson re-established ownership and "enthused the business with new vigour."

The business was sold to a consortium led by Mark William Lambert, a local businessman. The repeal of the taxes on newspapers in 1855, along with the hiring of new journalists and the installation of a new printing press, created an opportunity to expand the newspaper.

On 1 May 1858 the paper was re-launched as the Daily Chronicle and Northern Counties Advertiser. The editor, businessman and social reformer Joseph Cowen, became its sole owner at the end of 1859. He soon turned the Newcastle Daily Chronicle (as it was titled from 1867) into the most successful newspaper in the area and one of the most successful provincial newspapers of the 19th century.

In April 2013, the Evening Chronicle became known as The Chronicle or Chronicle Live.

== Present day ==
The Chronicle was a broadsheet from its inception until 8 October 1997, when it switched to become a tabloid. Prior to 2007 the paper was published twice daily, with an evening edition on sale from the late afternoon.

It concentrates on local news, human interest stories and sport, with a particular emphasis on Newcastle United F.C. A jobs supplement increases the paper's circulation every Thursday. In October 2013, the Chronicle and its sister publications The Journal and Sunday Sun were banned from Newcastle United F.C. due to the papers' coverage of a fans' protest march. The ban was later withdrawn.

The Chronicle's political coverage is focused towards the region and local politics: being a predominantly Labour supporting region, this feeds into the coverage of current affairs. However, the Chronicle has never made an official endorsement unlike contemporary regional papers such as the Evening Standard or the Liverpool Echo.

== Sister papers ==
Owned by Reach plc, the Chronicle is the sister publication of another North East newspaper The Journal. The two papers once complemented each other, with The Journal being published in the morning and the Chronicle in the afternoon, though both titles are now printed overnight and are on newsstands along with national titles.

In 2007, a local free paper The Herald and Post was rebranded under the Chronicle banner, as Chronicle Extra.

The Chronicle focuses on news and sport in the North East and in particular the Newcastle United. North East sport was covered by The Pink (a Chronicle supplement) from 1895 to 2005. The "Pink" paper was usually issued after the days football had concluded on a Saturday. The last edition was published on 17 December 2005.

== See also ==
- Sunday Sun
