= New philology (medieval studies) =

Intellectual movement in medieval studies

In medieval studies, new philology is an intellectual movement which seeks to move beyond the text-critical method associated with Karl Lachmann, which sought to gather manuscripts of a given text and use them to reconstruct a version of that text as close as possible to the earliest written version (or "archetype"). In contrast, New Philology seeks to edit and study texts in the form in which they are attested. Some of the key Anglophone proponents of the movement have also referred to it as New Medievalism.

== History ==
A key moment for the start of the movement was the 1989 publication of Bernard Cerquiglini's Éloge de la variante (In Praise of the Variant), which was critical of modernist positivist editorial practices for medieval texts. In the Anglophone world, the movement is particularly associated with a special issue of the Medieval Studies journal Speculum in 1990 edited by Stephen G. Nichols (who continued to promote the idea of New Philology thereafter). A prominent step for the movement in the German-speaking world came in 1994 with the Deutsche Forschungsgemeinschaft symposium entitled "Der unfeste Text" ("the variable text"), where, for example, Joachim Bumke considered the history of transmission and textual criticism of courtly epics in the thirteenth century, while an influential statement of the movement's principles was offered in the context of Old Norse literature by Matthew Driscoll in 2010.

The movement has been read as characteristic of postmodern approaches to history and authorship, and as part of a postmodern reaction to nineteenth-century nationalist thought. Despite the continued popularity of this philological approach, it has received important criticisms that stress the movement's sweeping rejections of emendations.
