= Biblical narratives in the Quran =

The Quran contains references to more than fifty people and events also found in the Bible. While the stories told in each book are sometimes comparable, there is usually some notable differences, as well as considerable difference as to what the Qur'an focuses on with each prophet's life and stories compared to the Bible. Biblical stories come from diverse sources and authors, so their attention to detail varies individually.

The Quran does not directly copy the Bible or the Apocrypha in any of its narratives; this is presented as the basic sign of orally transmitted Biblical knowledge. Accordingly, it is stated that "'the author’ of the Qurʾān would have heard only descriptions or paraphrases of such texts rendered into Arabic orally, most likely from some form of the Semitic language known as Aramaic." Islamic writers, however, attribute this to the purpose of the Quran, because according to them, the primary purpose of the Quran is to give religious and moral guidance to its audience.

The Islamic methodology of tafsir al-Quran bi-l-Kitab (Arabic: تفسير القرآن بالكتاب) refers to interpreting the Quran with/through the Bible. This approach adopts canonical Arabic versions of the Bible, including the Tawrat (Torah) and the Injil (Gospel), both to illuminate and to add exegetical depth to the reading of the Quran. Notable Muslim mufassirun (commentators) of the Bible and Quran who weaved biblical texts together with Quranic ones include Abu al-Hakam Abd al-Salam bin al-Isbili of Al-Andalus and Ibrahim ibn Umar al-Biqa'i.

== Torah narratives ==
=== Adam and Eve ===
The Quran usually mentions God creating Adam from "earth" or "clay" (ṭīn, although one verse suggests "dust" or "dirt" (turāb)). God is said to breathe his spirit into Adam as in the Genesis creation narrative, and also to have created him simply by saying "Be". The Quran then depicts the angels as doubting the creation of Adam, a detail not found in the Genesis accounts:^{[Quran 2:30]}

When your Lord said to the angels, "I am indeed going to set a viceroy on the earth," they said, "Will You set in it someone who will cause corruption in it and shed blood, while we celebrate Your praise and proclaim Your sanctity?" He said, "Indeed, I know what you do not know."

While not found in Genesis, the Quranic account is linked to a Jewish exegesis of Psalm 8, which wonders why God cares for human beings despite their cosmic insignificance. Some Jewish interpreters have understood the question as one being asked by the angels when God created Adam. This led to a tradition in the Babylonian Talmud in which the angels object to the evils that humans will commit in the future, which may be the source of the Quranic narrative.

The Quranic narrative continues that God "taught Adam the Names, all of them," and that Adam presented the names to the angels,^{[Quran 2:31]} whereas Genesis has Adam himself naming the animals. The difference highlights the Quranic emphasis on both God's absolute knowledge, and the superiority of humanity to the angels implied earlier.

God then commands the angels to bow down to Adam, but Iblis refuses, saying that he is better than Adam because he was created from fire and Adam from clay. The submission of the angels to Adam is another detail not mentioned in Genesis but important in Syriac Christian texts such as the Cave of Treasures, where it reflects a Christian notion of Adam as being a primordial analogue of Jesus. In the Cave of Treasures, Satan refuses God's order to bow before Adam "since I am fire and spirit, not that I worship something that is made of dirt", using almost the same words as in the Quran.

The creation of Eve is not specified in the Quran, but several verses imply the traditional Genesis account by stating that God "created you [humanity] from a single soul, and created its mate from it".^{[Quran 4:1]}

In the Quran, God then tells Adam and his unnamed wife to live in paradise but not to approach a certain tree, which Satan calls the "tree of immortality", whereas Genesis refers to two trees, a tree of the knowledge of good and evil which Adam and Eve must not eat from, and another tree of life. This appears to reflect Syrian Christian exegesis, in which the two trees were considered identical.

In the Quran it is Satan himself tricking Adam and Eve into approaching the tree, a progression of the Christian notion in which the Serpent becomes an incarnation of Satan, a link not traditionally made in Judaism.

In contrast to Christianity, Satan promises immortality or to "become like angel" by approaching the tree. The reference to "angels" might be an interpretation of the Biblical ʾĔlōhīm. Whereas ʾĔlōhīm are considered a reference to God in the Christian tradition, Islam adopted this term as a reference to angels.

When they are tempted by Satan, "their nakedness [becomes] apparent to them."^{[Quran 7:22]} All three are then expelled from Paradise. There is no mention in the Quran of Eve tempting Adam. While Genesis states that Adam and Eve "realized" that they were naked, the Quran is more ambiguous, referring to Satan's desire to "expose to them what was hidden from them of their nakedness".^{[Quran 7:20]} This may reflect Syriac Christian traditions in which Adam and Eve were thought to be clothed with "glory" before eating from the tree, at which point they became naked instead of merely realizing their prior nakedness.

According to the Quranic narrative, Adam is then forgiven by God after "receiving certain words from his Lord".^{[Quran 2:37]} While this is another detail not explicitly mentioned in Genesis, the Quranic episode again has a parallel in the Cave of Treasures, in which God comforts Adam and says that he has "preserved him from the curse" of the land, and from the pre-Islamic apocrypha Life of Adam and Eve, in which God promises Adam that he will eventually return to paradise.

=== Sons of Adam ===
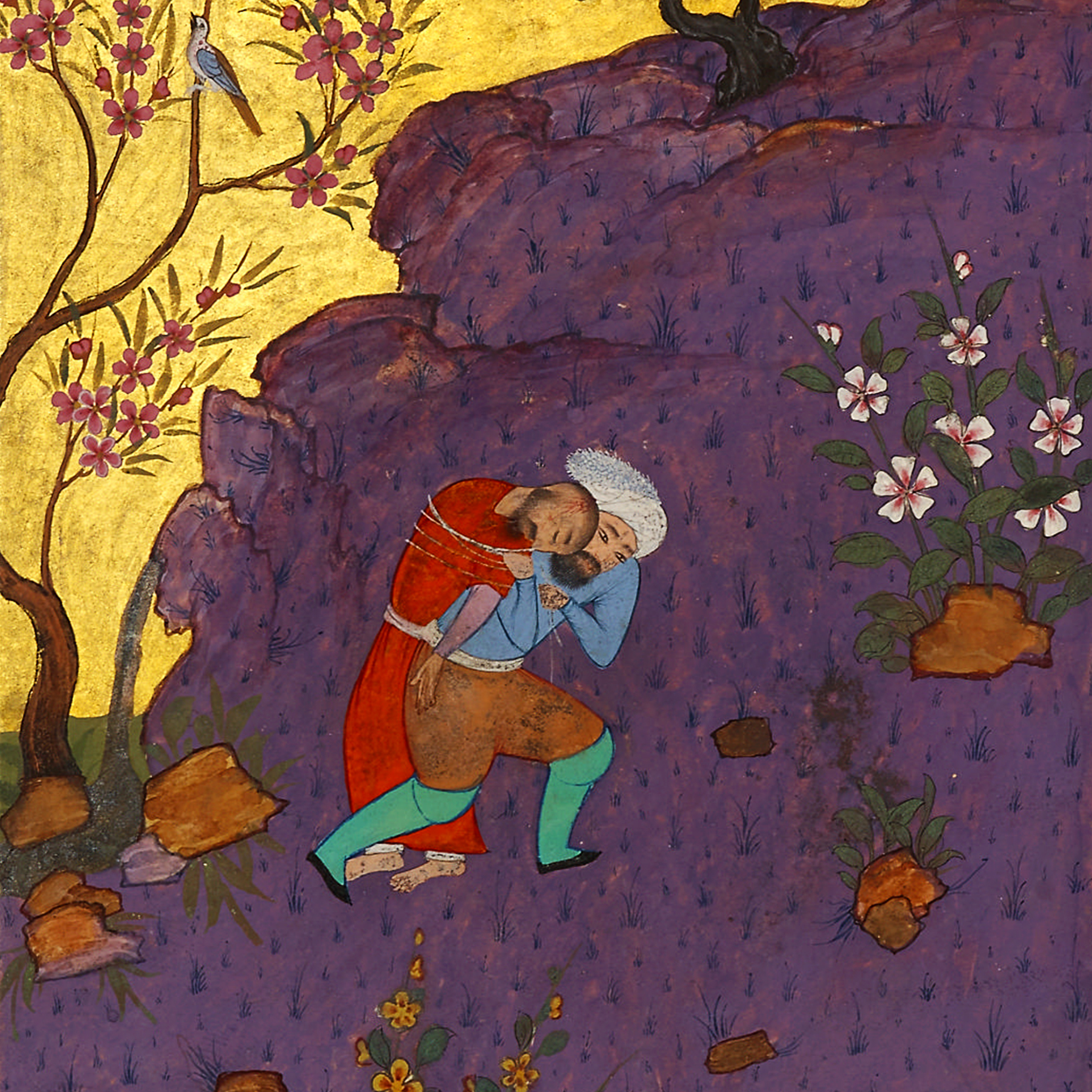
Islamic miniature of Cain carrying his murdered brother, Abel, to hide his corpse from God from an illuminated manuscript version of Stories of the Prophets.

In the Bible, Adam and Eve have two sons: the elder Cain, who is a farmer, and the younger Abel, a shepherd. When both make sacrifices to God, God only accepts Abel's offerings. Angered, Cain kills his brother despite God's warning. He is condemned to a lifetime of wandering and fruitless toil. The Quran narrates a similar story relating to the sons of Adam, although the brothers are not named.

However, a significant difference between the two versions is that while God speaks to Cain in the Bible, the brother who is accepted by God speaks to the rejected one in the Quran, saying:

God accepts only from the God-wary. Even if you extend your hand toward me to kill me, I will not extend my hand toward you to kill you. Indeed, I fear God, the Lord of all the worlds. I desire that you earn [the burden of] my sin and your sin, to become one of the inmates of the Fire, and such is the requital of the wrongdoers.^{[Quran 5:27–29]}

A conversation between Cain and Abel is attested in one Syriac source, although this version differs significantly from the Quran in that Abel begs his brother not to kill him. A conversation between the brothers before the murder is also found in the Targum Neofiti, an Aramaic-language Jewish annotation of the Torah.

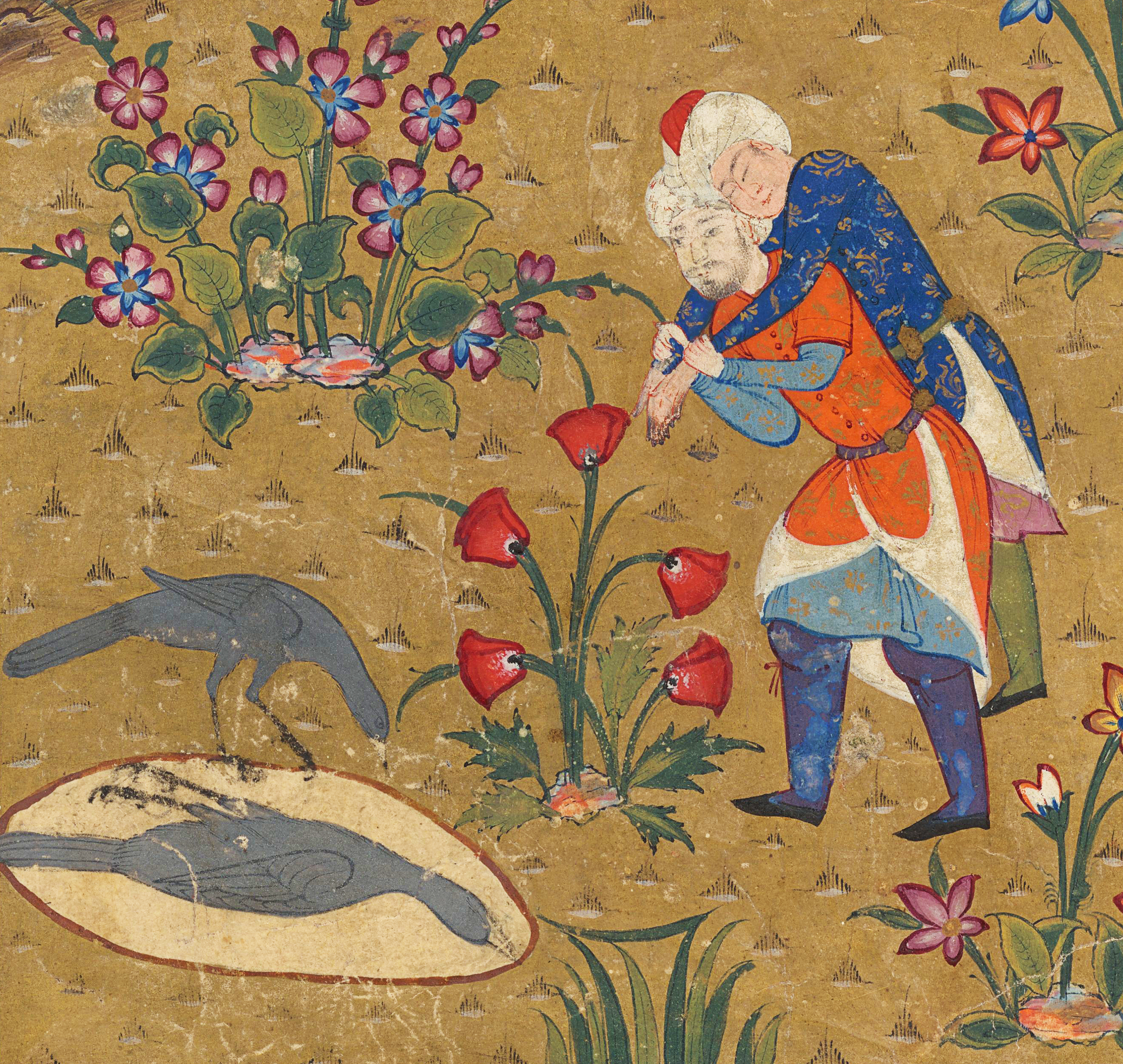
Islamic illustration of the crow showing Cain bury the body

The rejected brother then kills the younger brother, as Cain does to Abel. In the Quran, God then sends a crow to dig the earth in which to bury the murdered brother, and the murderer regrets his deed as he looks upon the crow. While a bird digging the earth for Abel is a motif that appears in certain late extra-biblical Christian and Jewish sources, such as the Tanhuma, the Quran is the earliest known version of the episode and may be the source of the other attestations.

The Quran then draws a lesson from the murder, not found in the text of the Torah:

That is why We decreed for the Children of Israel that whoever kills a soul, without [its being guilty of] manslaughter or corruption on the earth, is as though he had killed all mankind, and whoever saves a life is as though he had saved all mankind.^{[Quran 5:32]}

This verse is nearly identical to a passage in the Mishnah Sanhedrin tractate, part of the Jewish Oral Torah, which also concludes that the lesson of the murder of Abel is that "whosoever destroys a single soul is regarded as though he destroyed a complete world, and whosoever saves a single soul is regarded as though he saved a complete world".

=== Noah (Nūḥ) ===
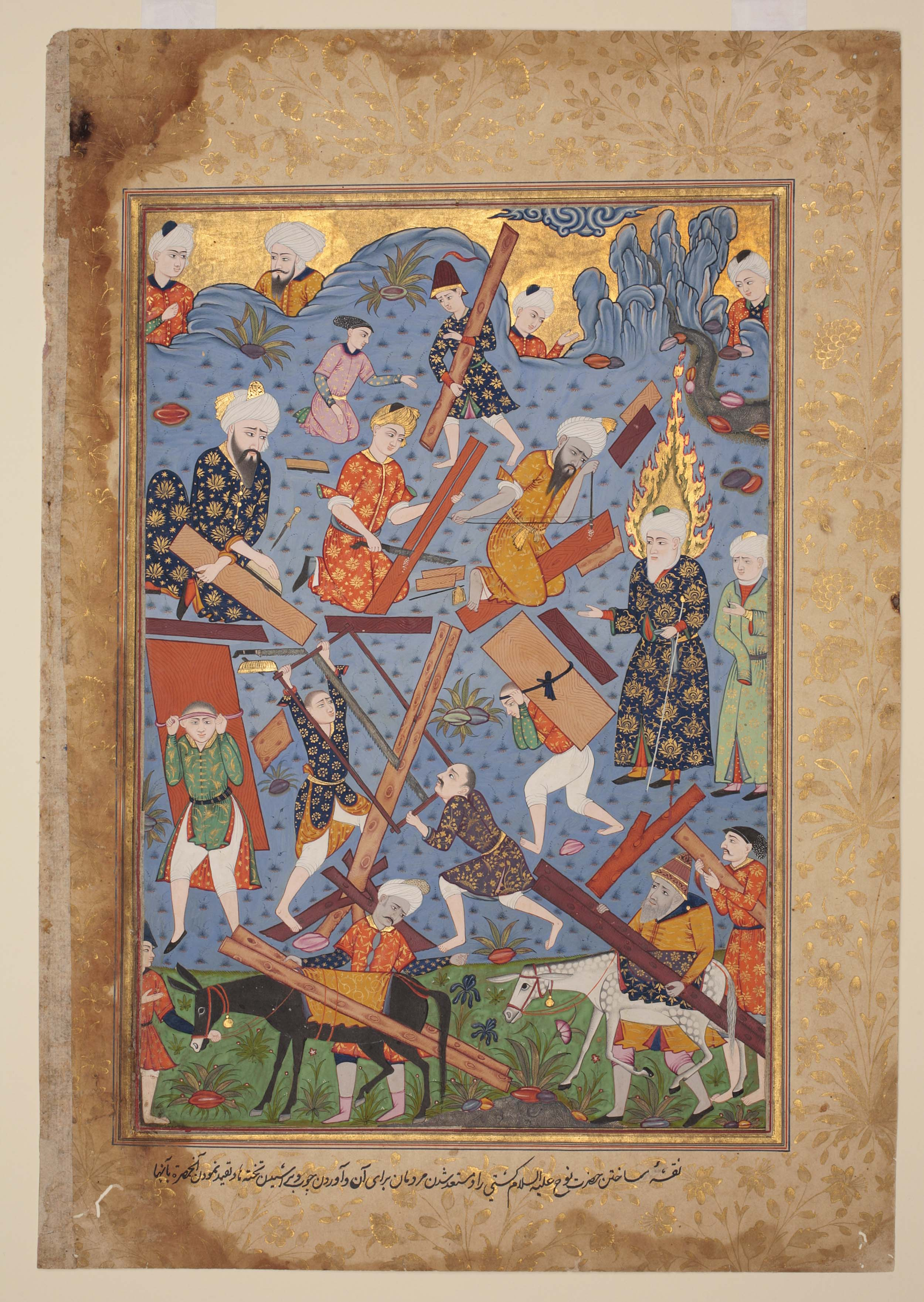
The building of Noah's ark, in a 17th-century Falnama (Islamic book of divination)

In both the Bible and the Quran, Noah is described as a righteous man who lived among a sinful people who God destroyed with a flood while saving Noah, his family, and the animals by commanding him to build an Ark and store the animals in them. In both sacred books, he is said to have lived for 950 years. But unlike in Genesis, which records not a single word from Noah before he leaves the Ark, the Quranic story of the prophet focuses less on the details of the flood and more on Noah's unsuccessful attempts to warn his people, directly quoting his attempts to persuade his wicked countrymen to turn to righteousness. This emphasis on Noah as a preacher vainly attempting to save others, while not found in the Torah itself, appears in Christian sources as early as the Second Epistle of Peter and was present in Jewish and Christian sources of Late Antiquity, including the Talmud. In the context of the Quran, it emphasizes the crucial notion that Noah and other biblical figures were prototypes of the Islamic prophet Muhammad, all preaching righteousness to save their people from doom.

The Bible and the Quran also diverge on the fate of Noah's family. In the Bible, all of Noah's immediate family is saved, including his three sons. But the Quran mentions a son of Noah who rejects the Ark, instead choosing to take refuge on a mountain where he is drowned. Noah asks God to save his son, but God refuses. This buttresses the recurrent Quranic emphasis on the importance of faith and righteous conduct over ties of family. The episode may also be connected to a passage in the Book of Ezekiel, which similarly stresses righteousness over blood ties by stating that "even if Noah and Daniel and Job were living there [in a sinful country]... they would be able to save neither son nor daughter, only themselves by their uprightness". But while the son of Noah who would not be saved is only hypothetical in Ezekiel, he is a real son in the Quran, traditionally identified (though not by the Quran itself) with Yam. The Quran also cites Noah's wife as "an example of the faithless" who was doomed to hellfire without further elaboration,^{[Quran 66:10]} although some Islamic exegetical traditions hold that she would call Noah a madman and was subsequently drowned in the flood. No similar reference exists in the Bible, although certain Gnostic legends entailed a hostile portrayal of Noah's wife. The Bible also records Noah being drunk on wine, and fell asleep naked, and after being found naked by his son Ham, he cursed Canaan, Ham's son. The Quranic narrative does not mention such an incident, so Muslims reject this biblical narrative.

In the Quran, the Ark is said to rest on the hills of Mount Judi (Hud 11:44); in the Bible, it is said to rest on the mountains of Ararat (Gen. 8:4) The Al-Djoudi (Judi) is apparently a mountain in the biblical mountain range of Ararat. The Quran cites a particular mount in the Ararat Range, whereas the Bible just mentions the Ararat Range by name. There is a Mount Al-Djoudi in the present-day Ararat mountain range in Turkey.

=== Abraham (Ibrāhīm) ===
==== Promised a son ====
See Genesis 18:1–15, 22:1–20 and Q11:69-74, Q15:51-89, Q37:102-109, and Q51:24-30. Several messengers come to Abraham on their way to destroy the people of Sodom and Gomorrah. Abraham welcomes them into his tent and provides them with food. They then promise their host that Isaac (ʾIsḥāq إسحٰق) will soon be born to Abraham's wife, Sarah (Sārah سارة). Sarah laughs at the idea because she is far too old to bear children. The Hebrew name יצחק means 'he laughs" and is one of the literary tropes in the biblical story. This is also reflected in the Quranic version.

Hud {[11:71 ^{(Yusuf Ali)}. "" And his wife was standing (there), and she laughed: But we gave her glad tidings of Isaac, and after him, of Jacob.""

Genesis 18:12 "After I am waxed old shall I have pleasure, my lord being old also?"

Hud 11:72 ^{(Yusuf Ali)}. "She said: "Alas for me! shall I bear a child, seeing I am an old woman, and my husband here is an old man? That would indeed be a wonderful thing!""

The angels rebuke her, telling her that by God's will she can bear a son. A conversation ensues in which Abraham admits that he wished God to have mercy on the people of Sodom and Gomorrah.

==== Sacrifices his son ====
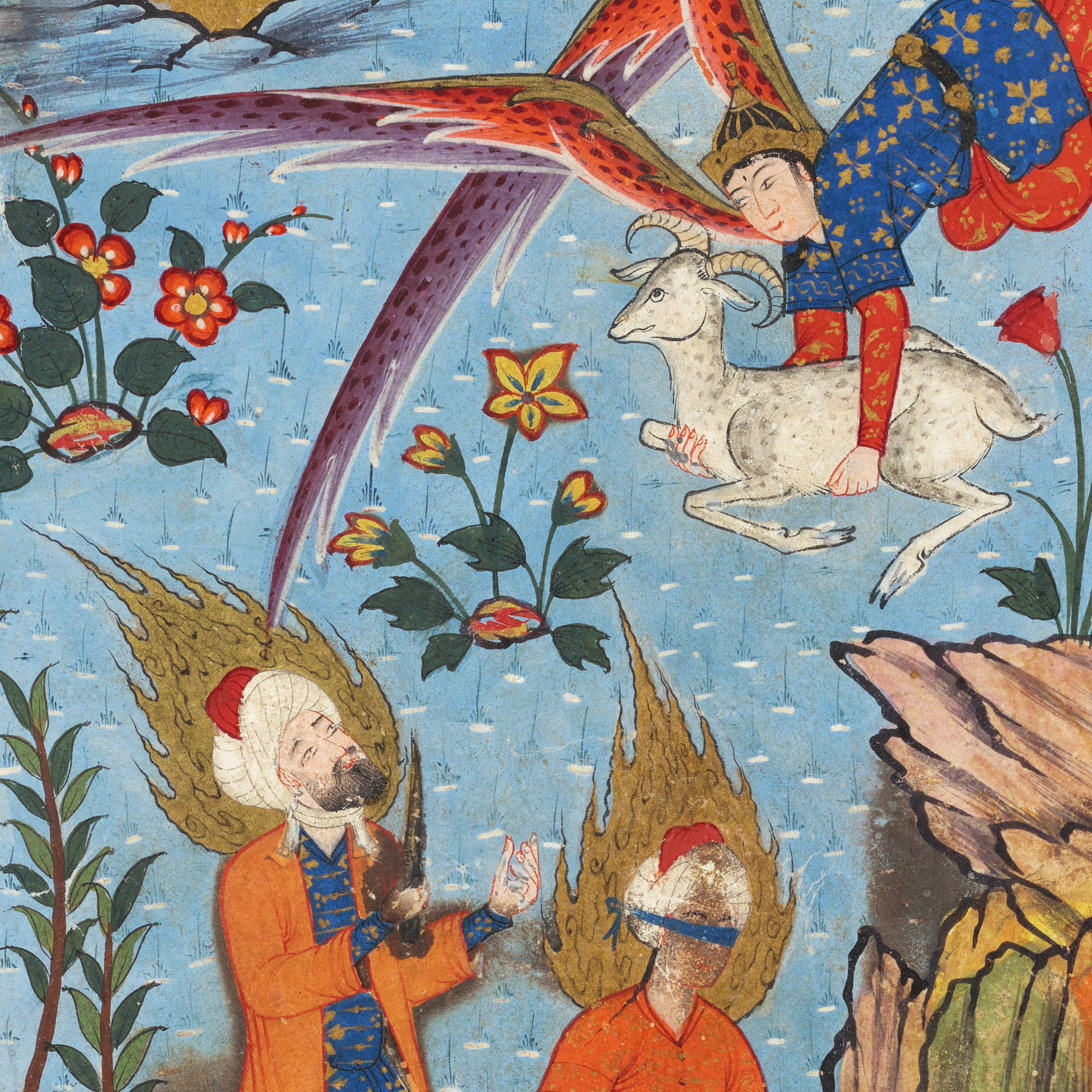
Islamic depiction of Ibrahim's sacrifice being stopped by divine intervention

In another narrative, Abraham receives a command (in his dream) from God to sacrifice his son. Abraham agrees to this and prepares to carry out the sacrifice. Before he can do so, however, God tells him to stop and gives him a replacement sacrifice. Abraham is subsequently honoured for his faithfulness to God. (As-Saaffat 37:102–108; Genesis 22:2–18)

=== Abraham's journeys in the Bible and Quran ===
The Bible describes Abraham as in Iraq-Syria, then in Canaan, Paran, and Egypt, with his final days in Canaan and Hebron. Both Isaac and Ishmael attend Abraham's funeral.

The Quran mentions that Abraham left his wife and Ishmael (as an infant) in the land where present-day Mecca is, while he returned to Canaan.

=== Lot and Sodom and Gomorrah (Lūṭ and "The People of Lot") ===
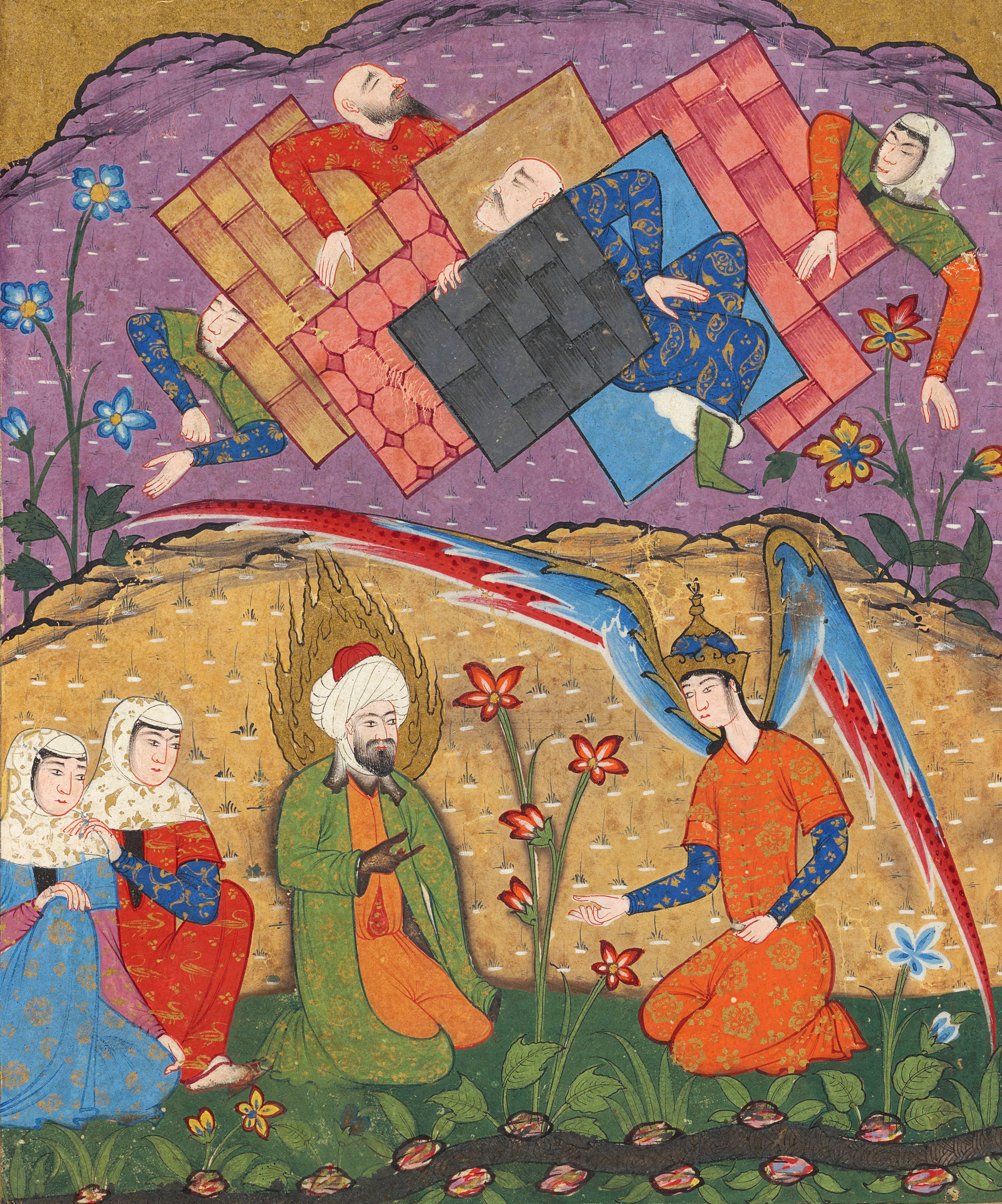
Lut and his daughters talk with Jibril, while the background is littered with the ruins of the towns and corpses of their inhabitants.

According to the Bible in the Book of Genesis, after visiting Abraham, two angels go to the city of Sodom in which Abraham's nephew Lot is a foreigner. They tell him God will soon destroy the city because of the wickedness of the people. The men of the city, upon hearing that Lot is entertaining male visitors, converge upon his house and demand that the men be brought out so that they can have sex with them. Lot offers his daughters in their place, but the men insist upon raping the angels instead. After blinding the city's inhabitants, the angels tell Lot and his family to flee by night and to not look back. The following morning, God destroys Sodom and Gomorrah with a shower of fiery stones from the sky. Lot's wife looks back to see the burning city and is turned into a pillar of salt.

The story continues further after the destruction of the twin cities, with Lot leaving Zoar (where he had fled for refuge) with his two daughters to live in a cave. Fearing that all the men were dead, the daughters decided that in order to 'preserve the seed of their father' and procreate, they must have sexual intercourse with him; they decide to get him into a drunken stupor so as to be able to 'lie with him' and obtain his seed. And so they each sleep with their father (one each on successive nights), having intoxicated him to a point wherein he could 'perceive not', and thus get impregnated by him. The Bible then continues:

"And the firstborn bare a son, and called his name Moab: the same is the father of the Moabites unto this day. And the younger, she also bare a son, and called his name Ben-ammi: the same is the father of the children of Ammon unto this day".

The biblical story of Lot ends here.

According to the Quran, Lot (or Lut, as he is called in the Quran) was a Prophet. A group of angels visited Ibrahim (Abraham) as guests and gave him glad tidings of a son "endowed with wisdom"; they told him that they had been sent by God to the "guilty people" of Sodom, to destroy them with "a shower of stones of clay (brimstone)". Several exegeses interpret the story of Lot as a condemnation of homosexuality and thus a justification for hate crimes.

Once again, the people of Sodom come asking Lot for his guests, and he offers his daughters instead. Islamic scholars have interpreted this as a marriage proposal, in order to justify why Lot, as a Prophet, would let his own daughters be raped.

The angels reassure Lot, but warn him that his wife will not be spared - "she is of those who lag behind". The story of them leaving the city proceeds much as in the Bible and ends with the destruction of the city.

There are several differences between the Quran and the Bible:

- In the Quran, Lot is described as a prophet, like his uncle Abraham. In Genesis (Genesis 19:1–29), Lot is not described as a prophet. In the New Testament, (2 Peter 2:7,8) Peter the Apostle describes Lot as a righteous man who was daily tormented by the lawless deeds he saw in Sodom.
- In both the Bible and in the Quran, Abraham pleads for God to have mercy (Quran 11:75; Gen. 18:24–33).
- In Genesis, Lot's wife leaves with Lot but turns around briefly and God turns her into a pillar of salt (Genesis 19:26). In the Quran, there is no mention of her leaving; rather Lot and his followers were commanded by the angels not to turn, but Lot is informed that his wife will turn and look behind (Quran Hud 11:123), and thus be destroyed with the rest of the two cities. (Q11:81).
- Following the destruction of Sodom, the Bible describes an incestuous event between Lot and his two daughters, at his daughters' behest, in Genesis 19:30–38. The Quran does not describe any such event.

(See Also: Bible: Genesis 19:1–26. Quran 15: 57–77, Q11:74–83, Q7:80–84, Q26:160–174, Q27:54–58, Q29:28–35, Q37:133–138, Q51:31–37, and Q54:36–39.)

=== Joseph (Yūsuf) ===
The narratives of Joseph can be found in Genesis 37–45 and in the first 102 verses of Surah Yusuf (Joseph) (Quran 12:1-102)

In both the Bible and the Quran, Joseph has a vision of eleven stars and the sun and the moon all bowing to him which he shares with his family (with his father in the Quran, who forbids Joseph from telling his brothers, and to his brothers in the Bible).

(Genesis 37:9) And he dreamed yet another dream, and told it his brothers, and said, "Behold, I have dreamed a dream more; and, behold, the sun and the moon and the eleven stars made obeisance to me."

(Yusuf 12:4) Behold! Joseph said to his father: "O my father! I did see eleven stars and the sun and the moon: I saw them prostrate themselves to me!"

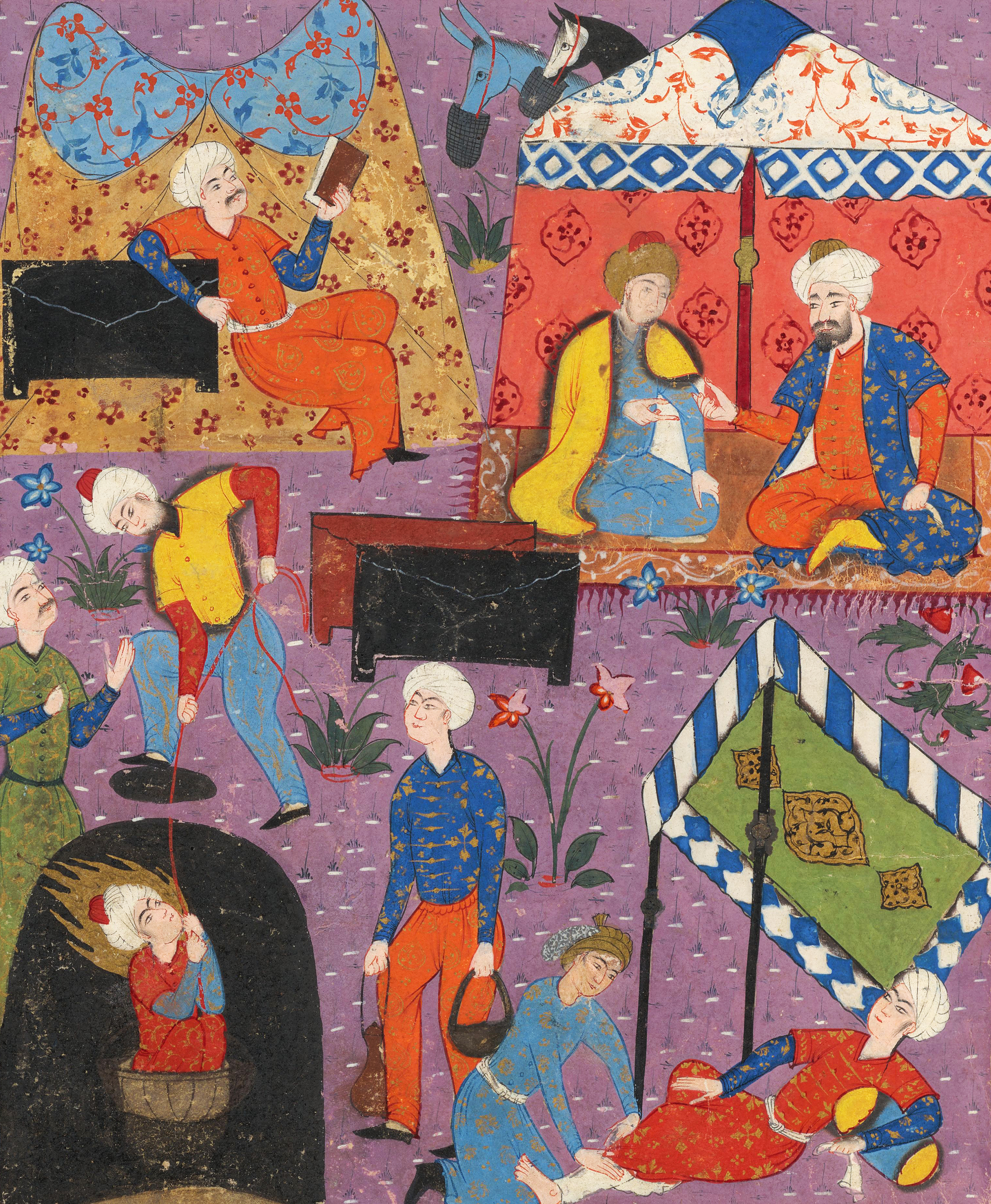
Islamic illustration of Yusuf in the well, while his brothers seek to sell him into slavery

Joseph's brothers became jealous that their father preferred Joseph over them, and so they form a plot to kill Joseph. However, one brother convinces them not to kill him but throw him down a well while they are alone. The brothers come to the father asking his permission to take Joseph out with them to enjoy and play with them. Jacob expresses his reservations against letting him go with them and expressing fear about a wild animal killing him while they were not careful about him. The sons assure the father of their being a mighty group against any threats to Joseph. The father eventually agrees to send Yusuf with them (in the Quran), while in the Bible, Jacob sends Joseph out of his own accord without sons trying to persuade him to let him go with them. (Yusuf 12:8–10; Genesis 37:20–22) They agree. They subsequently lie to their father as to Joseph's whereabouts, covering his clothing in blood and asserting that a wild animal had attacked him. A caravan passing the well inspires the brothers to pull Joseph out of the well and to sell him as a slave to traders in the caravan. Later the traders sell him to a wealthy Egyptian. (Genesis 37:27–36; Yusuf 12:20-22)

Joseph grows up in the house of the Egyptian. When Joseph is a grown man, his master's wife tries to seduce him. Joseph resists and runs away, but is caught by other servants and reported to his master. The wife lies to her husband, saying that Joseph tried to rape her. (Yusuf 12:25; Genesis 39:12); At this point, the two stories differ.

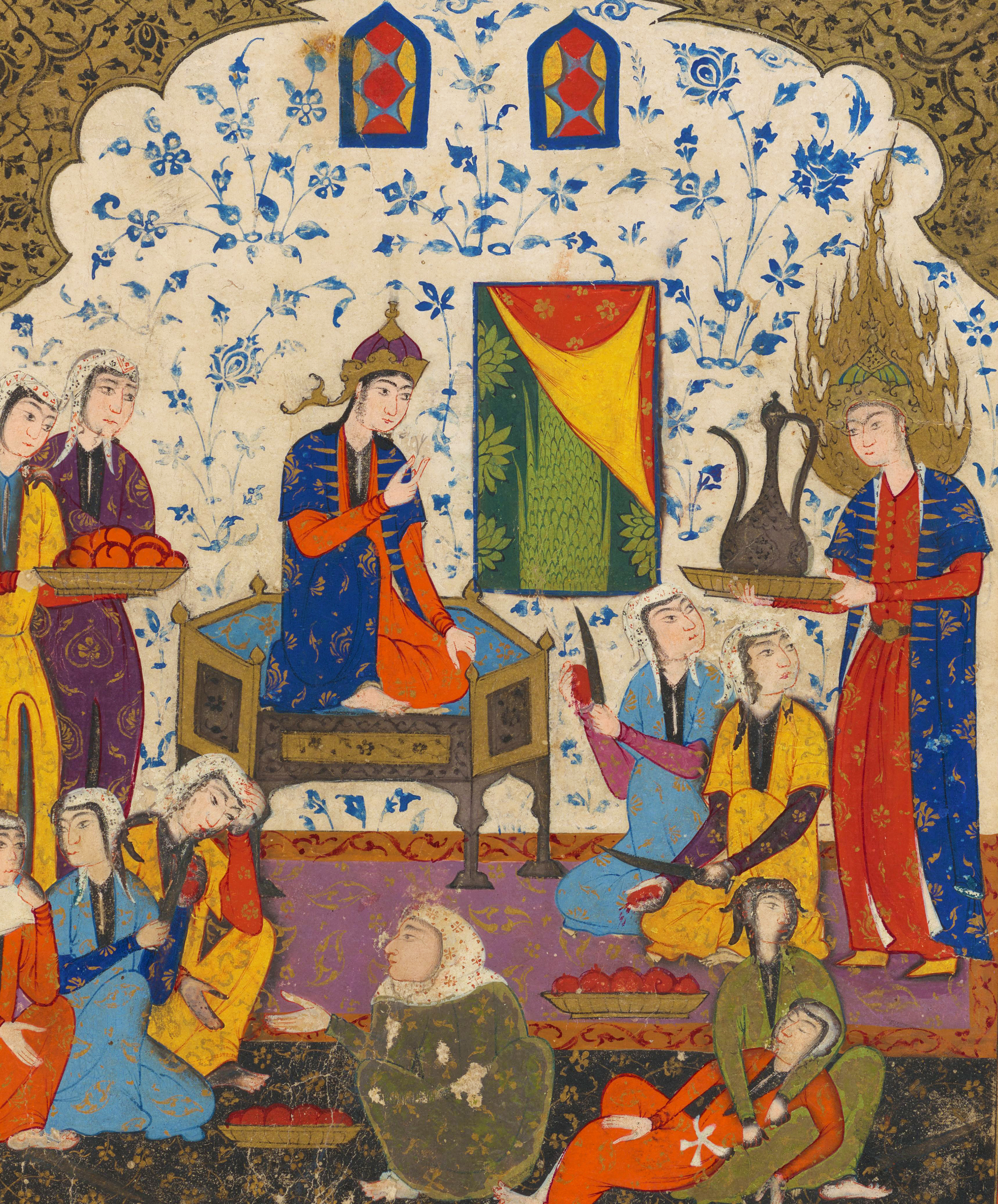
Islamic illustration of the manservant, Yusuf, carrying wine to the banquet. His prophetic beauty distracts women, making them cut into their flesh and it causes others to faint

In the Bible, Joseph's master (named as Potiphar) refuses to believe Joseph's denial and imprisons him. In the Quran, Joseph's master (who is only identified as "the Vizier") accepts the suggestion of another wise person to check Joseph's tunic. If it is torn from the front, the wise person asserts, it will prove Joseph a liar; but if it is torn from the back (as proves to be the case), Joseph will be vindicated and the master's wife proven a liar and an adulteress. The Vizier reprimands his wife and permits Joseph to remain in his household. The Vizier's wife hosts a banquet for women who had been gossiping about her and Joseph providing them with knives; Joseph is commanded to appear before the wife and her ladyfriends; they cut their hands with knives. (The Bible does not mention the banquet, and the Quran does not explain why the guests cut themselves, but a "post-Biblical Jewish tradition" describes Potiphar serving fruit to the gossips who, distracted by the handsome Joseph, cut themselves inadvertently while slicing it up.) Although the Vizier again recognizes Joseph's innocence, he orders him imprisoned nevertheless. In prison, Joseph meets two men. One has a dream of making wine and the other dreams of carrying a stack of bread that birds are eating. Joseph tells the first that he will serve the King again and the second will be executed. Both things happen, precisely as Joseph foretold. Although Joseph asks the first man to bring his name and unjust imprisonment to the attention of the King, (referred to in the Quran as only the King, not a Pharaoh) the first man quickly forgets about him once restored to the royal favour.

Sometime thereafter, Pharaoh/the King had a dream:

(Genesis 41:17–24) "17. Then Pharaoh said to Joseph, "In my dream, I was standing on the bank of the Nile, 18.when out of the river there came up seven cows, fat and sleek, and they grazed among the reeds. 19. After them, seven other cows came up – scrawny and very ugly and lean. I had never seen such ugly cows in all the Land of Egypt. 20. The lean, ugly cows ate up the seven fat cows that came up first. 21. But even after they ate them, no one could tell that they had done so; they looked just as ugly as before. Then I woke up." 22." In my dreams I also saw seven heads of grain, full and good, growing on a single stalk. 23. After them, seven other heads sprouted – withered and thin and scorched by the east wind. 24. The thin heads of grain swallowed up the seven good heads. I told this to the magicians, but none could explain it to me."

(Yusuf 12:43) The king (of Egypt) said: "I do see (in a vision) seven fat kine, whom seven lean ones devour, and seven green ears of corn and seven (others) withered. O ye chiefs! Expound to me my vision if it be that ye can interpret visions."

Pharaoh's/the King's cupbearer, who had been previously imprisoned with Joseph, suddenly remembers his promise and tells Pharaoh/the King about the man who foretold his own restoration to favour. Pharaoh/the King sent to the prison, asking Joseph to interpret his dream.

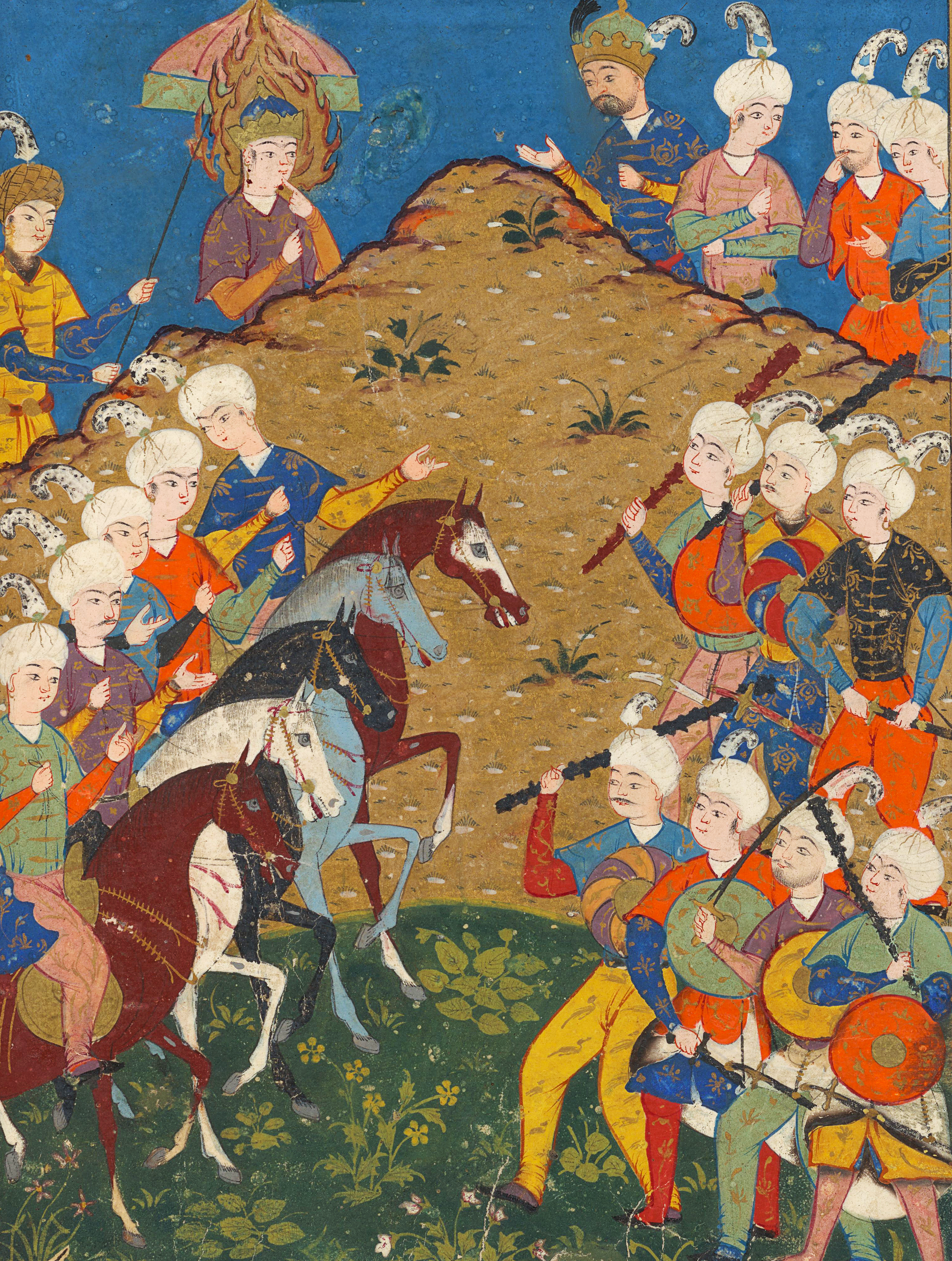
Islamic illustration of Yusuf defending Egypt's grain stores against the famine-struck armies of Rayyan of Hit

In the Quranic account, Joseph insists that the Vizier's wife vindicate him before the king after Joseph agrees to do interpret his dream (this is not mentioned in the Bible); Pharaoh summons the Vizier's wife, who admits her lies about Joseph and proclaims his innocence. The Quran rejoins the biblical narrative, where Joseph reveals the meaning of the king's dream: Egypt will have seven years of good crops followed by seven years of famine and the famine will be worse than the abundance. The king rewarded Joseph by giving him charge over the storehouses and the entire land of Egypt.

During the famine, Joseph's brothers came to Egypt to buy food, but the youngest was left with their father. While Joseph recognized them, they did not recognize him. He demanded that they return with the missing brother. The brothers return home and find that Joseph had hidden in their packs more than they paid for. They asked their father if they might return with the youngest brother. Reluctantly, their father allows this. They return, and after some further incidents, Joseph ultimately reveals himself to his brothers. (Genesis 45:1; Yusuf 12:90).

In both the Quran and the Bible, the missing brother is Benjamin, (Arabic: بن يامين) Joseph's only full blood brother. The others are half-brothers.

The Quran only refers to the ruler of Egypt during Joseph's time as "King" and never "Pharaoh".

=== Moses (Mūsā) ===
In the Bible, the narratives of Moses are in Exodus, Leviticus, Numbers, and Deuteronomy. The narratives here are mostly in Exodus 1–14 and 32. In the Quran, the Moses narratives are in the following passages: 2.49–61, 7.103–160, 10.75–93, 17.101–104, 20.9–97, 26.10–66, 27.7–14, 28.3–46, 40.23–30, 43.46–55, 44.17–31, and 79.15–25.

Pharaoh slew the young male children of the Israelites (Exodus 1:46), and to avoid this fate, Moses' mother cast Moses as an infant into a small ark, where God protected him. Moses was found by the household of the Pharaoh, who adopted him. Moses' sister, Miriam, had followed Moses, and she recommended that his own mother serves as a nurse to him. When Moses became an adult, he saw an Egyptian fighting with an Israelite, and he interceded and killed the Egyptian. The next day, the Israelite asked whether Moses intended to kill him as well. The Pharaoh tried to have Moses killed and Moses fled to a watering place in Midian. He met some sisters and watered their herd. When the women's father, Jethro, learned of Moses, he invited him to stay and gave him a daughter, Zipporah, to marry.

In Midian, Moses saw a fire and approached it. God spoke to him and told him to remove his shoes. God said that he had chosen Moses. God said to throw down his staff and to stretch out his arm as signs. His staff turned into a serpent and then returned to the form of a staff. His arm became white although he was not sick. God commanded him to go to Pharaoh to deliver a message. Moses said that he could not speak well. So God provided Aaron, his brother, to help Moses speak.

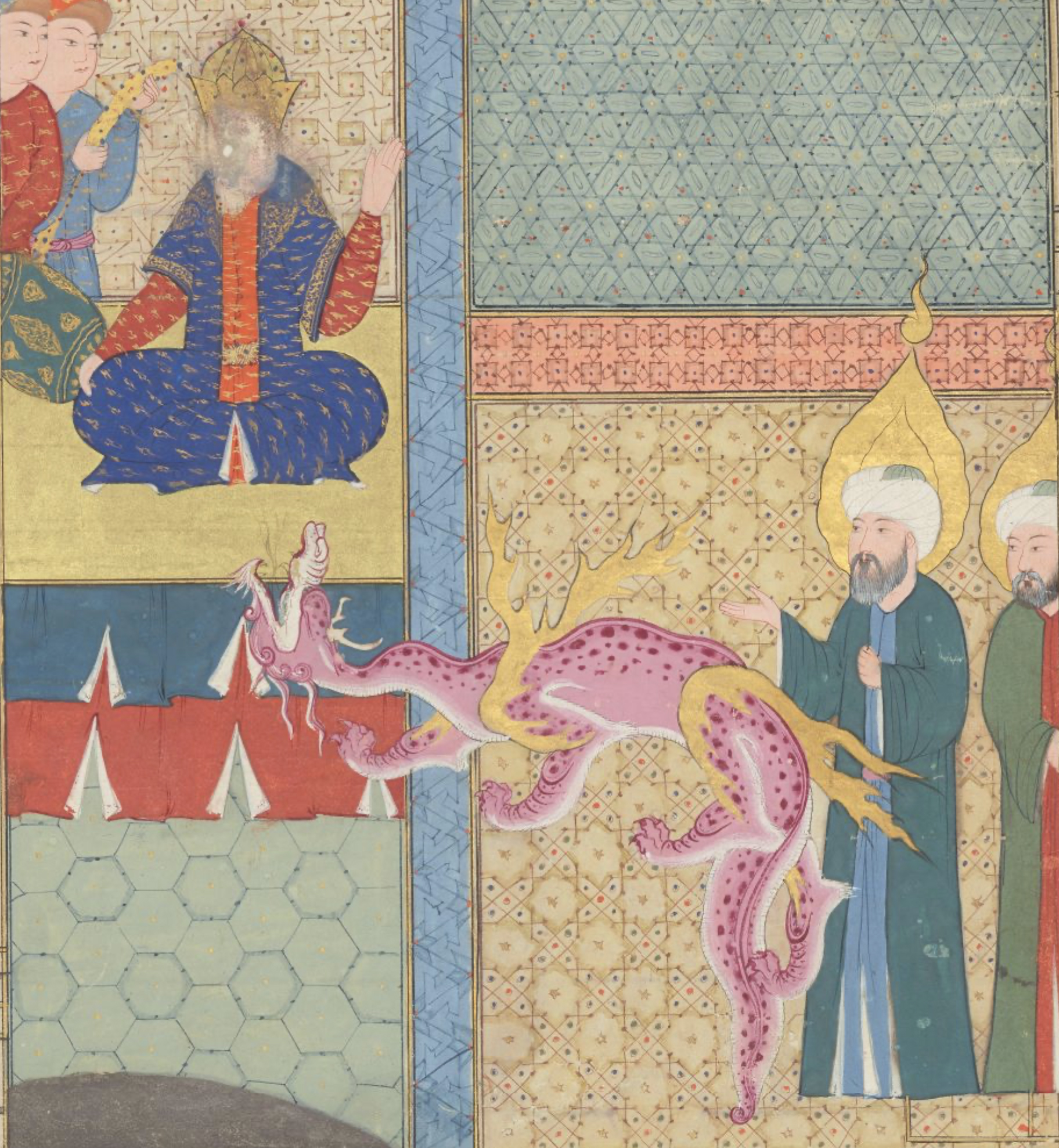
Islamic illustration of Musa (left) and Harun (right) transforming the staff to attack Pharaoh and his sorcerers

God sent Moses and Aaron to the court of Pharaoh. Pharaoh refused to listen to them. In response, Aaron threw down his staff and it became a serpent. This prompted Pharaoh's magicians also threw down their staffs, which also turned into snakes. But the snakes of Pharaoh's magicians were swallowed by Moses' serpent.

God caused a famine. God sent plagues of locusts, frogs, blood, and destruction. God sent at least nine signs to Pharaoh, but Pharaoh ignored these signs. When he could ignore them no longer, he agreed to let the Israelites go. However, after God had allowed tranquility, Pharaoh went back on his word and refused to let the Israelites go. As punishment, God made every first-born Egyptian son die and spared every Israelite (the first Passover). Pharaoh became hysterical and demanded that Moses and the Israelites leave at once- only to pursue them with his army after their exit. Then God helped Moses lead the Israelites into a desert and across a sea. Moses struck the sea with his staff and the sea split in half exposing dry land (while creating a wall of water on each side) for the Israelites to walk through. Pharaoh and his army were catching up to the Israelites but the water returned to its original state. Pharaoh's army drowned, but the biblical narrative is unclear whether or not Pharaoh himself drowned. (Exodus 14:28)

Moses left the Hebrews for forty nights. He put his brother Aaron in charge of the people (Al-Baqara 2:48) On a mountain, God gave Moses a revelation of precepts for Israel to follow. God made tablets with writing on them which Moses carried back to Israel.

Moses asked to see God. The people saw the fire and lightning and the mountain and were afraid. While Moses was gone, the Israelites demanded to worship an idol. They used the gold from their ornaments to construct a golden calf who they said was the god who rescued them from Egypt. Aaron does not stop them. Then Moses returned and chastised them and Aaron. Many were killed for their actions. God sent down manna and quail to eat but the Hebrews still rebelled against God, and complained about the food. Moses asked God for water and God answered him. Moses struck a stone with his staff and water came forth. The Israelites were divided into twelve tribes.

God gave the Israelites a bountiful land, but this occurred at different times in the two scriptures. Besides that and the many additional details in the Torah, there are other differences:

- The biblical Moses is reluctant to become a prophet and makes excuses. He eventually agrees and Aaron speaks and performs miracles at first until Moses is ready and takes over. In the Quran, Aaron was made God's messenger on Moses' request to back him up in the difficult task. Moses asked God to give him human support from his family, then asks for Aaron (his brother) praising Aaron by saying that he (Aaron) is a better speaker than him (Moses).
- The sorcerers, in the Quranic story, repent after seeing Moses' signs and submit to God at the anger of Pharaoh.
- In the Bible, Moses first goes to Pharaoh without showing any signs.
- In Exodus, Aaron helps make the golden calf. In the Quran, Aaron himself was a messenger of God and was representing Moses in his absences. He opposed that idea with all his might and warned the Israelites that God will be angry with them. In the Quran, a person named Samiri (not to be confused with Samaritans) leads the Israelites to worship the golden calf.
- In the Quran, Pharaoh drowned, but God said in the Quran that he preserved the pharaoh's body as an example for generations to come (or made an example for coming generations)

See also Aaron, Islamic view of Aaron, and Pharaoh in Islam.

=== Destruction of Korah ===
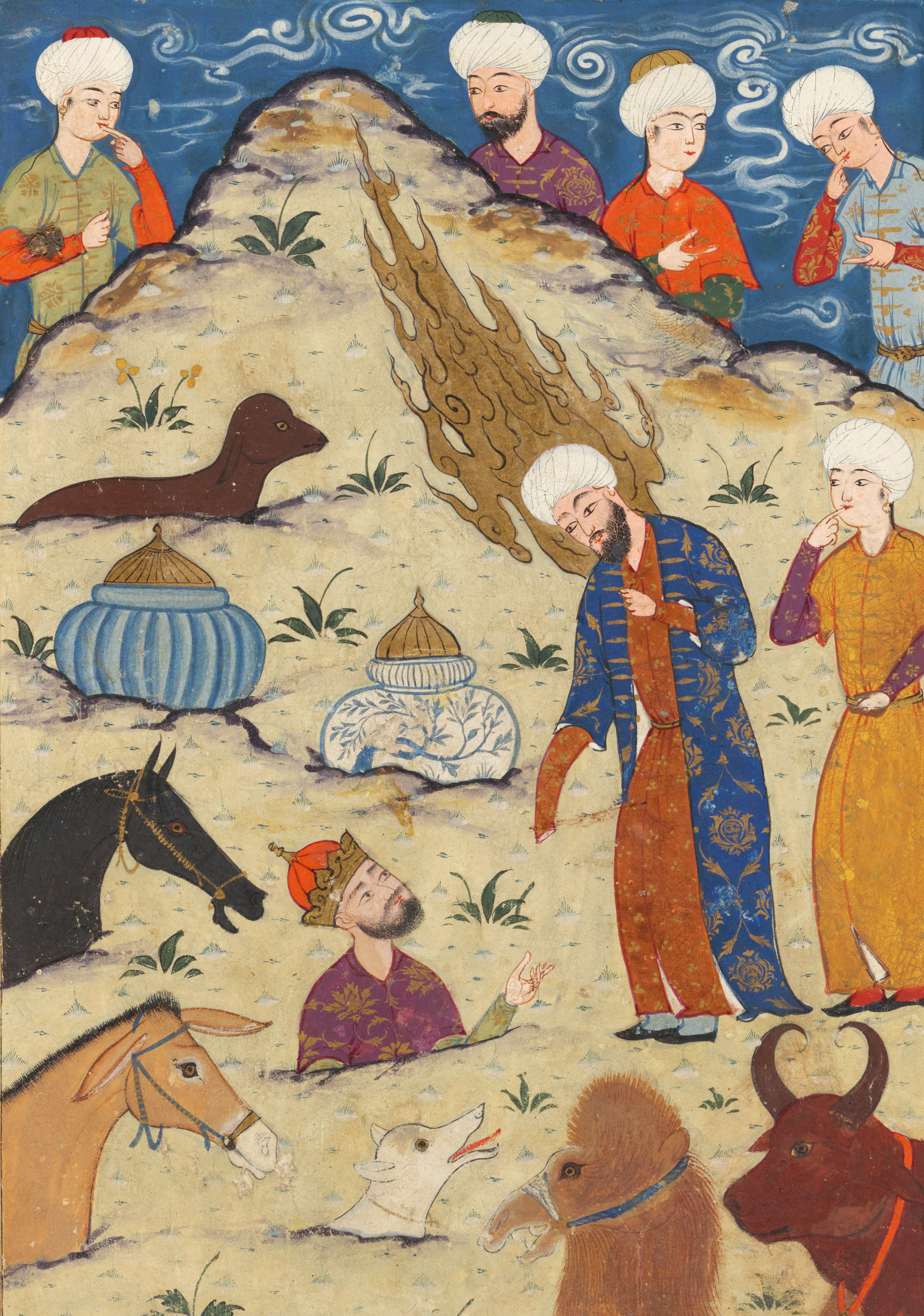
Islamic depiction of Musa watching Qarun and his palace be swallowed by the earth from a Persian 1580 manuscript.

The story of the destruction of Korah appears in Numbers 16:1–50 in the Torah and in Al-Qasas 76–82 in the Quran. Korah was an Israelite living during the time of Moses. Because of his wickedness, God caused him to die by opening the ground and swallowing him and his home (Numbers 16:31–33; Al-Qasas 28:81). In the Quran, Qārūn is simply a rich man who is too arrogant. In the Torah, he leads a minor rebellion against Moses. God also kills the others who rebel with him and destroys their homes.

== Later Hebrew Bible narratives ==
=== Gideon/Saul (Tālūt) ===
In the Quran and the Bible, there are stories about smaller armies winning victory over larger ones. One story in the Quran and the Bible share strong resemblances, although they are placed at different times and attributed to different characters. The Bible story features Gideon from the Book of Judges and the Quran story features Talut (usually translated as Saul).

In the Book of Judges 6–8 of the Bible, Gideon receives commands from God to take the Israelites to war against the Midianites. Gideon is reluctant, but accedes after making God prove Himself with three different tests. As they are heading to fight, God tells Gideon to send away those who are homesick or afraid of dying. Because the army is still large enough to credit its own strength for victory, God tells Gideon to observe the drinking habits of his troops at the river. God says to send those who do not drink with their hands, but lap the water directly like a dog, back to their homes. The remaining Israelites go on to victory.

In 2:246-248 of the Quran, God chooses Talut (generally considered to be Saul) to lead the Israelites into battle against the army of Goliath. On their way, God tells Talut to warn the men that they will be tested by God, and that they must not drink from the next river in order to pass the test. Despite this warning, most of the men disobey and drink from the river. God tells Talut to leave the disobedient members behind, unless they only drank one handful so that the army will consist of only faithful members. The army then goes on to defeat General Goliath's army.

=== Saul, David and Goliath (Tālūt, Dāwūd and Jalut) ===
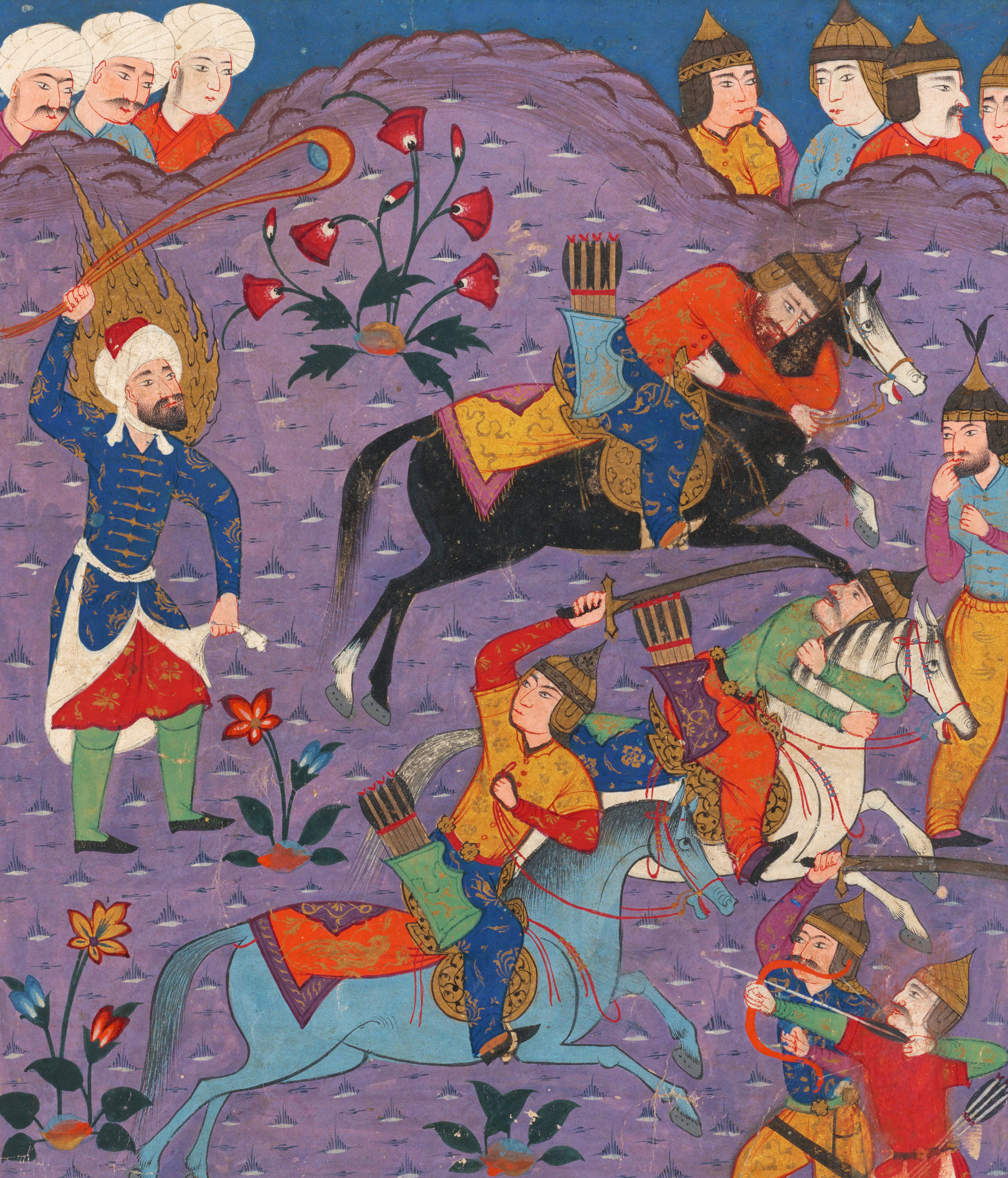
Islamic depiction of Davud defeating the army of Jalut with his slingshot

The story appears in 1 Samuel 8–12 and 17:1–58. The Prophet Samuel is petitioned by the Israelites for a king. God sends Samuel to appoint Saul as the king, although with the warning that kings only take from their people. At least a few people are not happy with Samuel's choice, but Saul then prophesizes and wins some victories, so the people embrace him. Later Saul falls out of God's favour and God promises to appoint someone else as king. The Philistines attack and are bolstered by the fear engendered by their champion Goliath, a giant. God sends Samuel to recruit David, who kills Goliath. David eventually goes on to become Israel's new king.

A similar story appears in the Quran 2:246–251. The Israelites demand of their prophet to appoint a king, and so God appoints the man Talut. The people respond poorly to the selection, upset that Talut does not seem special. God gives the Ark of the Covenant back to the Israelites in order to verify His choice (this is an event that predates Saul in the Bible). Talut leads the men to battle against an army led by the General Goliath. The Israelite army is small and doubtful, but a few men trust that God can still give them victory. David then kills Goliath and becomes king of Israel. The account also bears similarity to when Gideon led an army. See the above Gideon/Talut subsection.

=== The Queen of Sheba ===
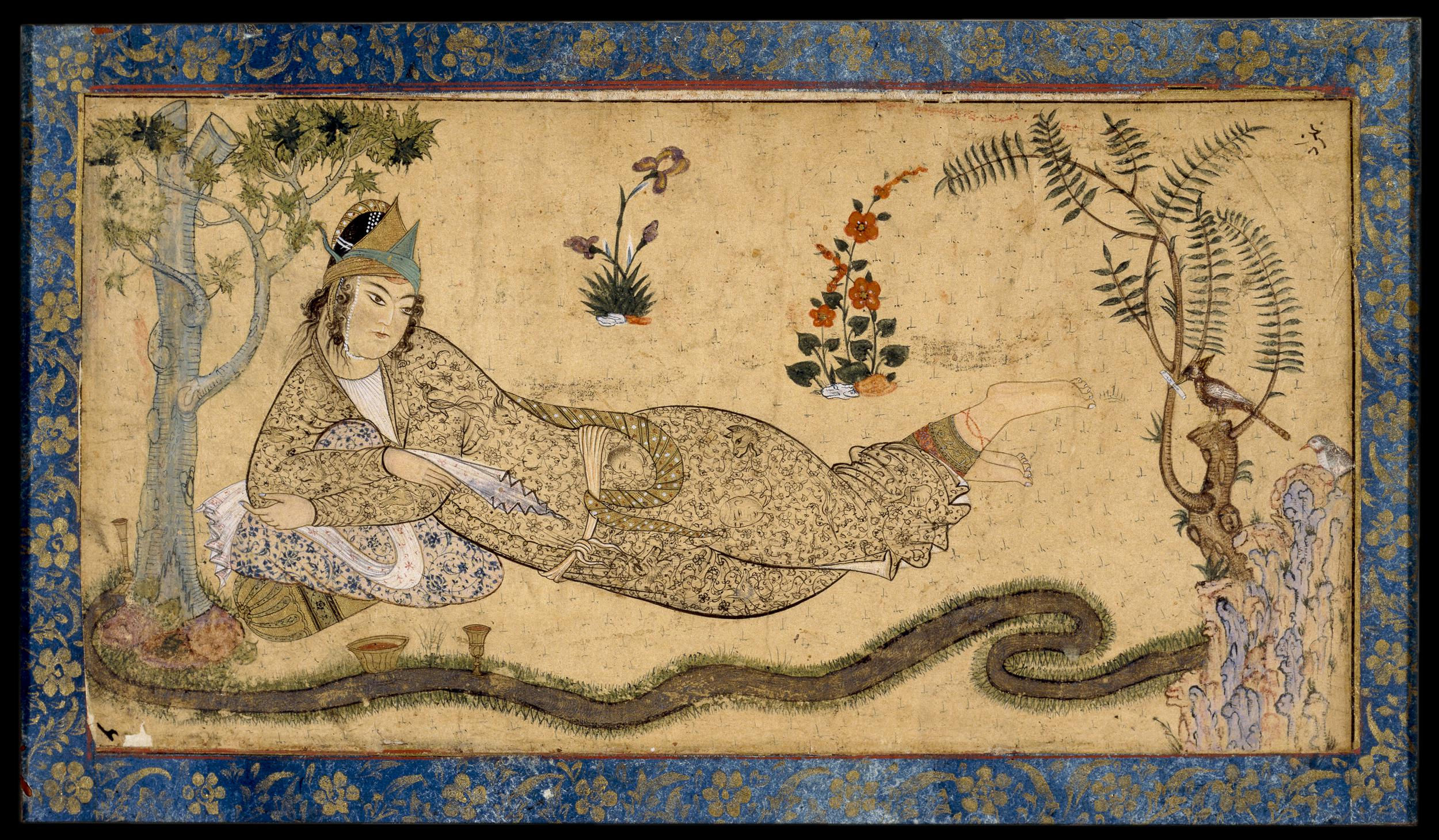
Bilqis (the queen of Sheba) reclining in a garden, facing the hoopoe, Solomon's messenger. Persian miniature(c. 1595), tinted drawing on paper

The story appears in 1 Kings 10:1–13 and 2 Chronicles 9:1–13 and in verses Surah 27 20–44. The two stories have almost nothing in common. In each, the Queen of Sheba comes to visit Solomon and is impressed by his wisdom and riches. In the Bible, the visit is only diplomatic. In the Quran, the Queen becomes monotheist and peace is established in the kingdoms. Although not part of the Quran, Islamic tradition holds that the name of the Queen of Sheba is Bilqis or Balqis.

=== Jonah (Yūnus) and the big fish ===
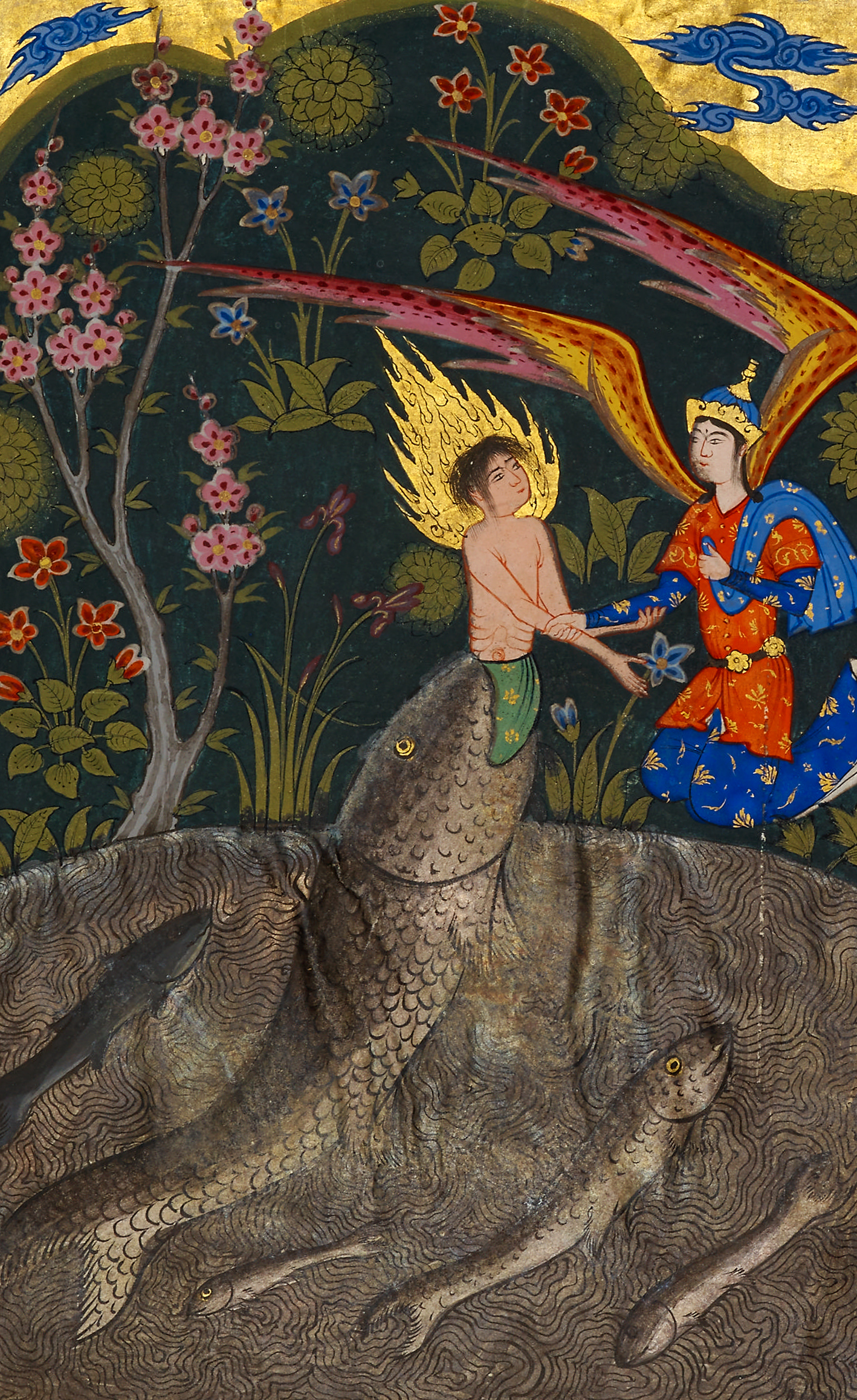
Islamic depiction of the Yunus narrative

In both the Bible and the Quran, Jonah is swallowed by a "big fish", usually inferred to be a whale. The Book of Jonah in the Bible consists of four chapters about Jonah's mission to Nineveh. Jonah is referenced three times in the Quran: in verses 139–148 of Sura 37 (As-Saaffat) (Those who set the ranks), verses 87–88 of Sura 21: al-Anbiya' (The Prophets) and verses 48–50 of Sura 68: al-Qalam (The Pen)/Nun. It is mentioned in verse 98 of Sura 10: Yunus (Jonah) and verse 86 of Sura 6: al-An'am (The Cattle).

In the Quran, Jonah gets frustrated by his own people and abandons them to God's mercy, however without asking permission from God and thus going against his given responsibility. In the Quran, it is also mentioned that if Jonah had not prayed inside the belly of the fish he would have stayed in there until the Judgement day. In the Bible, Jonah pays a fare to sail to Tarshish. In both stories, he boards the ship loaded with passengers, lots are cast and Jonah is thrown overboard and swallowed by a large fish (Jonah 1:17, As-Saaffat 37|142). After praying, he is cast out of the fish and washed ashore, and God causes a gourd to grow (37|146) or weeds (2:5). In the Bible, Jonah continues into Nineveh, and the city is spared by God. In the Quran, God causes the gourd to grow to comfort Jonah after he lies on the shore in a sickly state (As-Saaffat 37|145), in the Bible the gourd plant grows up to provide shade for Jonah while he waits for Nineveh to be destroyed (Jonah 4:6). According to an Islamic tradition however, the big fish gets frightened at first, fearing it might have swallowed a holy person as it heard prayers and supplications read in a wonderful voice from her stomach, hearing which numerous sea creatures had surrounded it. But she comforts herself later since it was God's order to swallow Jonah. After two days the fish casts him out the beach of an island and he is very weak. The gastric juices with the hot sunlight burned his skin till the point he was about to scream of pain. God causes a vine to grow over him and provide him fruit and shade. He recovers and goes back to his people who had become good after he left. According to the Bible, Ninevah was a great city, with more than one hundred twenty thousand people and much livestock (Jonah 4:11). In the Quran, the number of people he was sent towards as a prophet exceeded a hundred thousand. They believed in his message and God granted them prosperity for a long time. (As-Saaffat 37|147–148). In the New Testament, Jesus refers to the Ninevites repenting at the preaching of Jonah (Matthew 12:41, Luke 11:32).

=== Haman ===
In the Bible, Haman was an Agagite noble and vizier of the empire under Persian King Ahasuerus who desires to persecute the Jews. In the Quran, Haman is an adviser and builder under a Firaun (Pharaoh) of ancient Egypt whose narrative relationship with Moses is recounted in the Quran.

The structure which Firaun commands Haman to build is similar to the Tower of Babel in Genesis, unrelated to the narrative of Haman in the Bible. Both structures are made from burnt bricks for the purpose of ascending to the heavens.

== New Testament narratives ==
=== Zechariah (Zakariya) and John (Yahya) ===
The story of Zechariah is told in the Gospel of Luke 1:5–80 and 3:1–22 and in the Quran 3.37-41 and 19.2–15. In both accounts, Zechariah and his wife reached an old age without bearing children. Zechariah is told his wife would conceive, despite her barrenness, and his name would be John. As a sign that this would happen, Zechariah becomes mute. John grows to be a devout man. Both accounts mention John's death.

Each account also contains unique elements and differ regarding Zechariah's muteness. In the Bible, Gabriel appears to Zechariah, a priest, on the right side of the altar telling him that his wife will conceive. Zechariah questions how his wife could conceive when he is an old man and his wife is barren, and is struck mute because of his disbelief. Later, Elizabeth conceives. After Elizabeth gives birth and they went to circumcise the child, Zechariah confirms that the son's name is John and receives his speech back.

In the Quran, God promises Zechariah a child and Zechariah similarly questions God. God replies that it is easy, just as he created Zechariah from nothing. Zechariah then asks for a sign, and God responds that he will not speak to anyone for three nights, except by gesture. This may imply he simply would not find an occasion to speak to anyone. Zechariah comes out from his prayer chamber and gestures to praise God in the morning and afternoon.

=== Mary (Maryam) ===
Mary's life is told in several books of the New Testament and the Quran.

==== Bible ====
In the Bible, in the sixth month after the conception of John the Baptist by Elizabeth, the angel Gabriel was sent from God to the Virgin Mary, at Nazareth. Mary was of the house of David, and was betrothed to Joseph, of the same royal family. And the angel had taken the figure and the form of man, came into the house and said to her: 'Hail, full of grace, the Lord is with thee.' Mary having heard the greeting words did not speak; she was troubled in spirit, since she knew not the angel, nor the cause of his coming, nor the meaning of the salutation. And the angel continued and said: 'Fear not, Mary, for thou hast found grace with God. Behold thou shalt conceive in thy womb, and shalt bring forth a son; and thou shalt call his name Jesus (in Matthew 1:21–22 a meaning for the name is given "for he shall save his people from their sins.

In Hebrew ישוע sounds like the Hebrew word for salvation "ישועה"). He shall be great, and shall be called the Son of the Most High; and the Lord God shall give unto him the throne of David his father, and he shall reign in the house of Jacob forever. And of his kingdom there shall be no end.' Not doubting the word of God, unlike Zachariah, but filled with fear and astonishment, she said: "How shall this be done, because I have not known a man?' The angel, to remove Mary's anxiety and to assure her that her virginity would be spared, answered: 'The Holy Ghost shall come upon thee and the power of the Most High shall overshadow thee. And therefore also the Holy which shall be born of thee shall be called the Son of God.' In token of the truth of his word he made known to her the conception of John, the miraculous pregnancy of her relative now old and sterile: 'And behold, thy cousin Elizabeth; she also has conceived a son in her old age, and this is the sixth month with her that is called barren: because no word shall be impossible with God.' Mary may not yet have fully understood the meaning of the heavenly message and how the maternity might be reconciled with her vow of virginity, but clinging to the first words of the angel and trusting to the omnipotence of God she said: 'Behold the handmaid of the Lord, be it done to me according to thy word.'

In Luke, Mary is betrothed to Joseph but the Quran never mentions any man. In the Quran, 'her people' have a conversation with Mary accusing her of fornication. In the Bible, no such conversation happens but Joseph knows that people are thinking this.

==== Quran ====
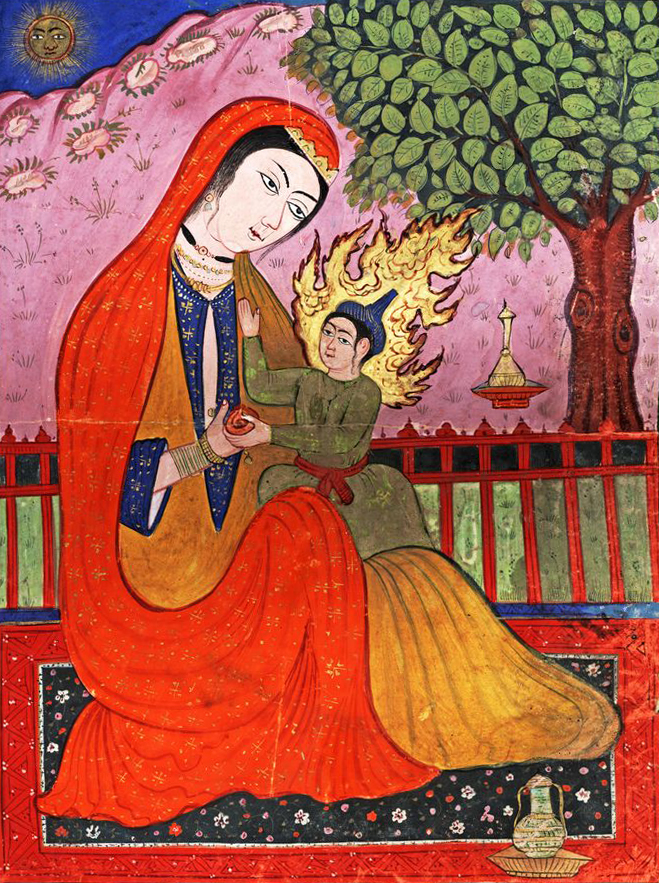
Islamic depiction of Maryam holding baby Isa

"Maryam", a Quranic chapter (surah) is named for Mary and the Quran mentions Maryam by name in numerous verses (āyāt), starting with her birth.

Q3:36-37: Then when she (the wife of ʿImrān) had given birth to her she said:

My lord: I have given birth to a female (And God knew best to what she was to give birth. And the male is not like the female.) And I have named her Maryam.

Then her lord accepted her with a comely acceptance and caused her to grow with a comely growth And placed her under the care of Zakariyyā. Whenever Zakariyyā entered upon her in the sanctuary he found with her provision. He said:

O Maryam: whence comes this to you?

She said: It is from the presence of God. God gives provision to whom he wills without reckoning.

Her final mention is in the final verse of Chapter 66 "Prohibition".

=== Jesus (ʿIsa, Yeshuaʿ) ===
==== New Testament narrative ====
Jesus's ministry takes up the whole of the four Gospels (Matthew, Mark, Luke and John) in the Bible, as well as being the focus of the subsequent books of the New Testament. Some stories common to all four Gospels include:

- Jesus was baptized by John the Baptist
- Subsequently travelled as an itinerant preacher and healer
- Took on twelve apostles
- Miraculously fed 5000 people at least once
- Entered Jerusalem on a donkey
- Drove merchants from the Second Temple
- Predicted his betrayal by one of his disciples
- Was crucified
- But resurrected from death

Each gospel represents a different perspective, with some different information and emphases than each of the other gospels. Christians accept all four books as part of the canon of Scripture.

==== Quran narrative ====
Jesus directly appears several times in the Quran: Al-Imran 35–59; An-Nisa' 156–158; Al-Ma'idah 109–120; Maryam 16–35, Al-Mu'minun 50; Az-Zukhruf 57–65; As-Saff 6 and 14. He is also indirectly referred to in other locations.

The Quran contains few narratives from Jesus' life, but does include many brief descriptions in common with the Bible:

- Made the dead to live
- Was the prophesied Messiah
- Flew into Egypt with Mary in childhood
- Had disciples
- Taught disciples to carry on his ministry
- Healed individuals inflicted with blindness and leprosy
- Had a last supper with his disciples

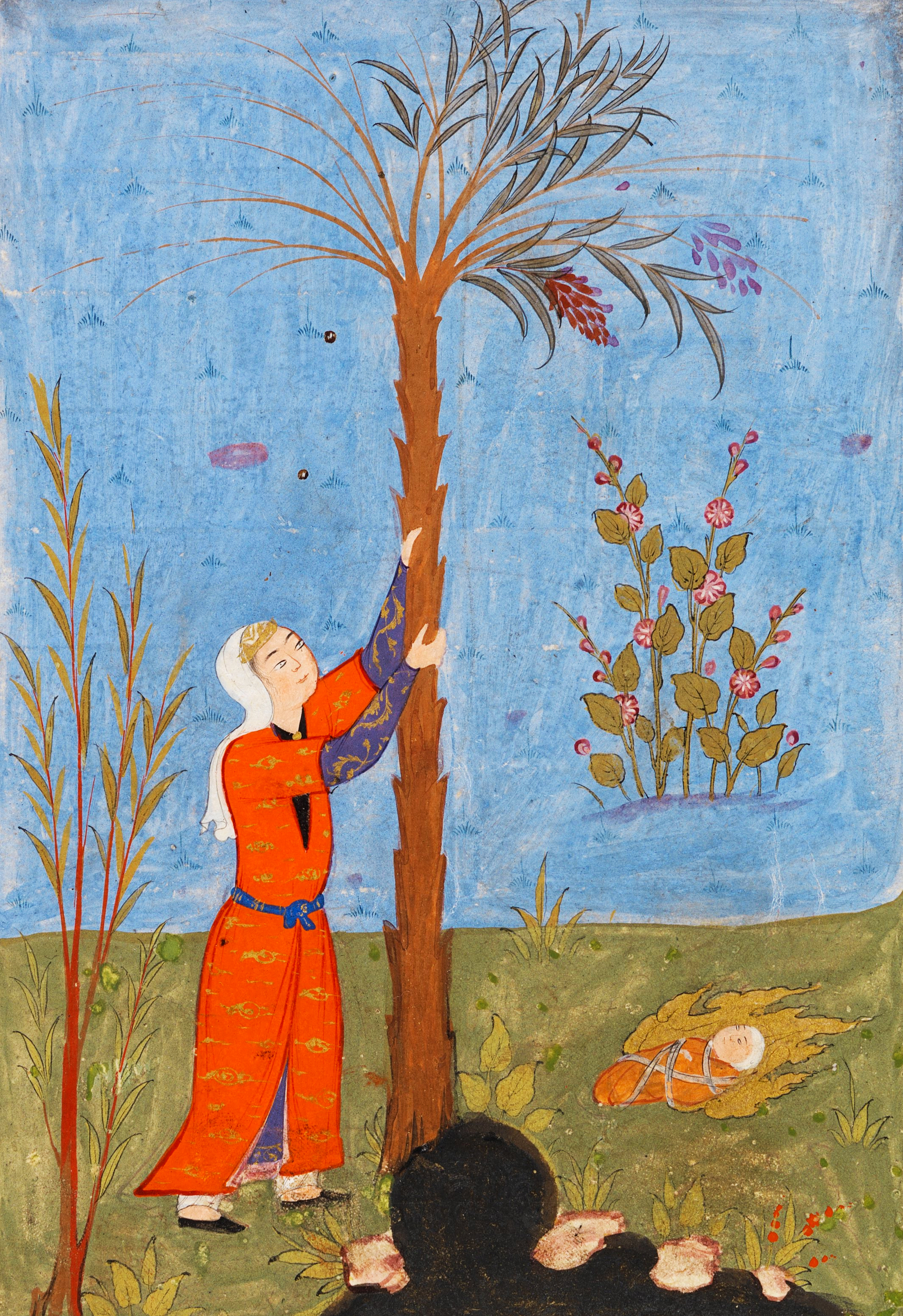
Islamic depiction of the nativity: Maryam shakes a date-palm in labor, below her the source of the voice and baby Isa

The details of Jesus's birth differ from those offered in the gospels of Matthew and Luke (see above section). Other accounts in the Quran do not exist in the Bible. Two such stories, one in which infant Jesus verbally testifies to Mary's virginity and another in which young Jesus forms and breathes life into clay birds, have counterparts in non-canonical Christian literature (see Infancy Gospels). The Quran rejects that Jesus ever expected to be interpreted as divine and that he only taught strictly tawhid. The Bible also claims that Jesus was crucified and died, under the authority of Pontius Pilate. The Quran denies that Jesus died.

=== Satan and his host ===
Surah 26:94-95 state "then they shall be pitched into it, they and the perverse and the hosts of Iblis, altogether", reminiscent of Matthew, XXV:41: "Then shall He say also unto them on the left hand, Depart from me, ye cursed, into everlasting fire, prepared for the devil and his angels."

== Other figures ==
The Quran and the Bible have over 50 characters in common, typically in the same narratives. The Quran identifies Enoch (Idris) and Ishmael as prophets (Surah Maryam 19:54-58), but they are never given a story. In the Bible, all these men are identified as righteous people but not prophets — except Ishmael who is blessed by God (Genesis 17:20).

There is also one person mentioned in the Quran, Dhul-Qarnayn, who is not mentioned in the Bible by that name. (see Alexander the Great in the Quran).

== Mixed similarities ==
In several cases, the Quran and the Bible have common events but occur in different narrations.

=== Idol calf and Samaritan ===
In the Bible, in Moses' absence, certain people who went out of Egypt with the Hebrews worship a golden calf saying "This is your God, O Israel, who brought you up out of Egypt." Hundreds of years later, Samaria was founded and became the capital of the Northern Kingdom of Israel. King Jeroboam, its first king, also made two golden calves and said, "These are your gods, O Israel, who brought you up out of Egypt."

The Quran tells the story of a calf while Moses is gone. A man called "the Samari" (in Yusuf Ali's translation) or "the Samaritan" (in Arberry's) is blamed for protagonizing their idolatry (Surah Ta-Ha 20:85-88, 95).

A verse in Hosea 8:5–6 contains the same content as Ta-Ha 20.97 where Hosea refers to the Jeroboam calf and the Quran refers to the earlier calf. Both feature a prophet speaking to the Samaritan/Samaria promising to destroy the calf.

Throw out your calf-idol, O Samaria! My anger burns against them. How long will they be incapable of purity? They are from Israel! This calf – a craftsman has made it; it is not God. It will be broken in pieces, that calf of Samaria.

(Moses) said: "Get thee gone! but thy (punishment) in this life will be that thou wilt say, 'touch me not'; ... Now look at thy god, of whom thou hast become a devoted worshipper: We will certainly (melt) it in a blazing fire and scatter it broadcast in the sea!"(Yusuf Ali ^{[Quran 20:97]})

In the Quran, Moses' punishment that the Samari cannot be touched is the same as the modern Samaritan's punishment where no Jew was allowed to touch them because of their idolatry. In his commentary, Yusuf Ali claims that the Samari is not a Samaritan.

=== Miriam and Mary ===
In Arabic, both the names Mary and Miriam are called Maryam. Maryam, the mother of Isa, is the only woman to have her name mentioned in the Quran; all other women are mentioned only by relations, and their names were given later by commentators. While referring to her as the mother of Jesus, the Quran also refers to her as the "daughter of Imran," the Quranic name for Joachim, and "sister of Harun," which is commonly interpreted by some critics of Islam as her being the "daughter of Amram, the father of Moses," and "sister of prophet Aaron" (in verses 66:12 and 19:28–30), alluding to Miriam, the Biblical figure from the Torah. According to James K. Walker, "critics have noted that the Quran appears to confuse Mary … in the New Testament with Miram of the Old Testament, who … lived some 1400 years earlier". Muslims commonly respond to this by quoting a narration where the prophet Muhammad said:

The (people of the old age) used to give names (to their persons) after the names of Apostles and pious persons who had gone before them.

== See also ==
- List of legends in the Quran
- Abrahamic religion
- Islam and Judaism
- Islamic view of the Bible
- Isra'iliyat
- Christianity and Islam
- Christianity and Judaism
- Comparative religion
- Cyrus (Bible)
- List of chapters in the Quran
- Miracles of Jesus
- Miracles of Muhammad
- Superstitions in Muslim societies
