= Talut =

Servant of Allah in the Quran identified with king Saul of ancient Israel

- Malik Banī Isrā'īl (lit. 'King of the Israelites')
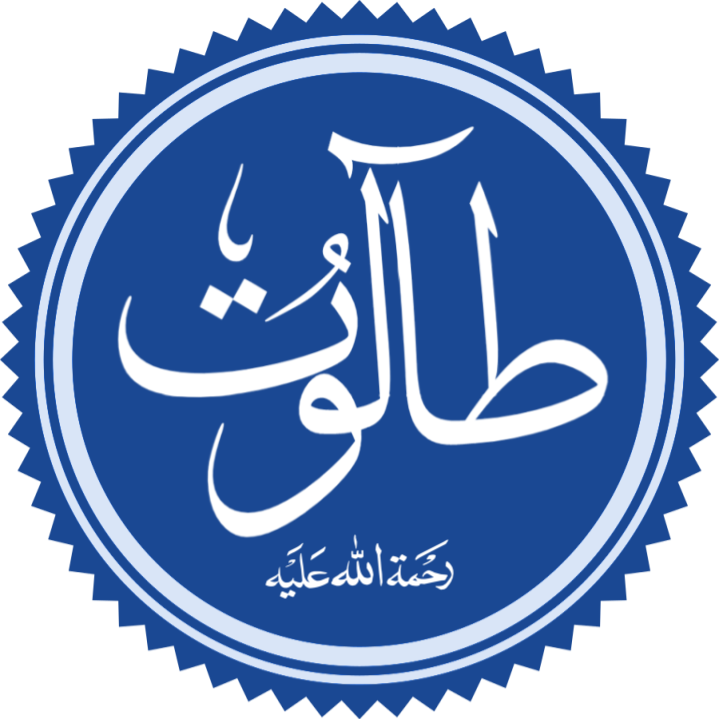

King of Israel
- Reign: 1037 BCE – 1010 BCE
- Predecessor: Position established
- Successor: Dawud
- English: Saul (according to Muslim tradition)
- Arabic: طالوت
- Religion: Islam

Talut (Arabic: طالوت, romanized: Ṭālūt) is a divinely appointed king mentioned in the Quran traditionally identified with the Israelite king Saul, as he is stated to be the Malik (مَلِك, 'king') of Israelites.

== Name ==
The name Talut (طالوت) has an uncertain etymology. Unlike most other figures found in both the Hebrew Bible and the Quran, the Arabic name is not similar to the Hebrew name (שָׁאוּל, Šāʾūl). According to Muslim exegetes, Ṭālūt means "tall" and refers to the extraordinary stature of Saul, which would be consistent with the Biblical account. In explanation of the name, exegetes such as the 11th-century scholar Abu ʾIsḥāq Aṯ-Ṯaʿlabī hold that at this time, the future king of Israel was to be recognized by his height; Samuel set up a measure, but no person in Israel reached the sufficient height except for Saul. The name is also similar to the name of Goliath (Arabic: جالوت, romanized: Jālūt) in the Quran.

== Narrative in the Quran ==
After the time of Musa (Moses), the Israelites began to demand a king to lead them into war against their enemies. Consequently, Talut was appointed king by prophet Samuel of the Children of Israel who announced that God had chosen Talut as the new king of Israel. The Israelites questioned the prophet's decision, lacking respect for Talut due to his lack of wealth. The prophet then told them that Talut was more favoured than they were. He was distinguished from the rest by his great knowledge and by his physique. A sign of his rightful role as king was that God had brought back the Ark of the Covenant to Israel for the Israelites. Talut tested his people at a river: whoever drank from it would not follow him in battle excepting one who took from it a handful. Many of them drank, but only the faithful ventured on. Talut then led the Israelites to victory over the army of Goliath, who was killed by Dawud (David). Talut is not considered to be a prophet (نَـبِي, nabī) of God, but rather a divinely-appointed king.

== Hadith ==
Talut is also mentioned in a hadith (Arabic: حَدِيث, lit. 'narration'): "Narrated Al-Barāʾ: The companions of Muhammad, who took part in Badr, told me that their number was that of Talut's companions who crossed the river (of Jordan) with him, and they were over three-hundred-and-ten men. By God, none crossed the river with him, but a believer."

== See also ==
- Gideon
- Saul, the first king of Israel who Talut is traditionally identified with
- Samuel, the selector of Saul as the king of Israel and announcer of his new kingship to the Israelites
- List of people in both the Bible and the Quran
