= Al-Bireh, Rashaya =

Al-Bireh بيرة Biré, El Bire, El Bireh, Birra
- Village
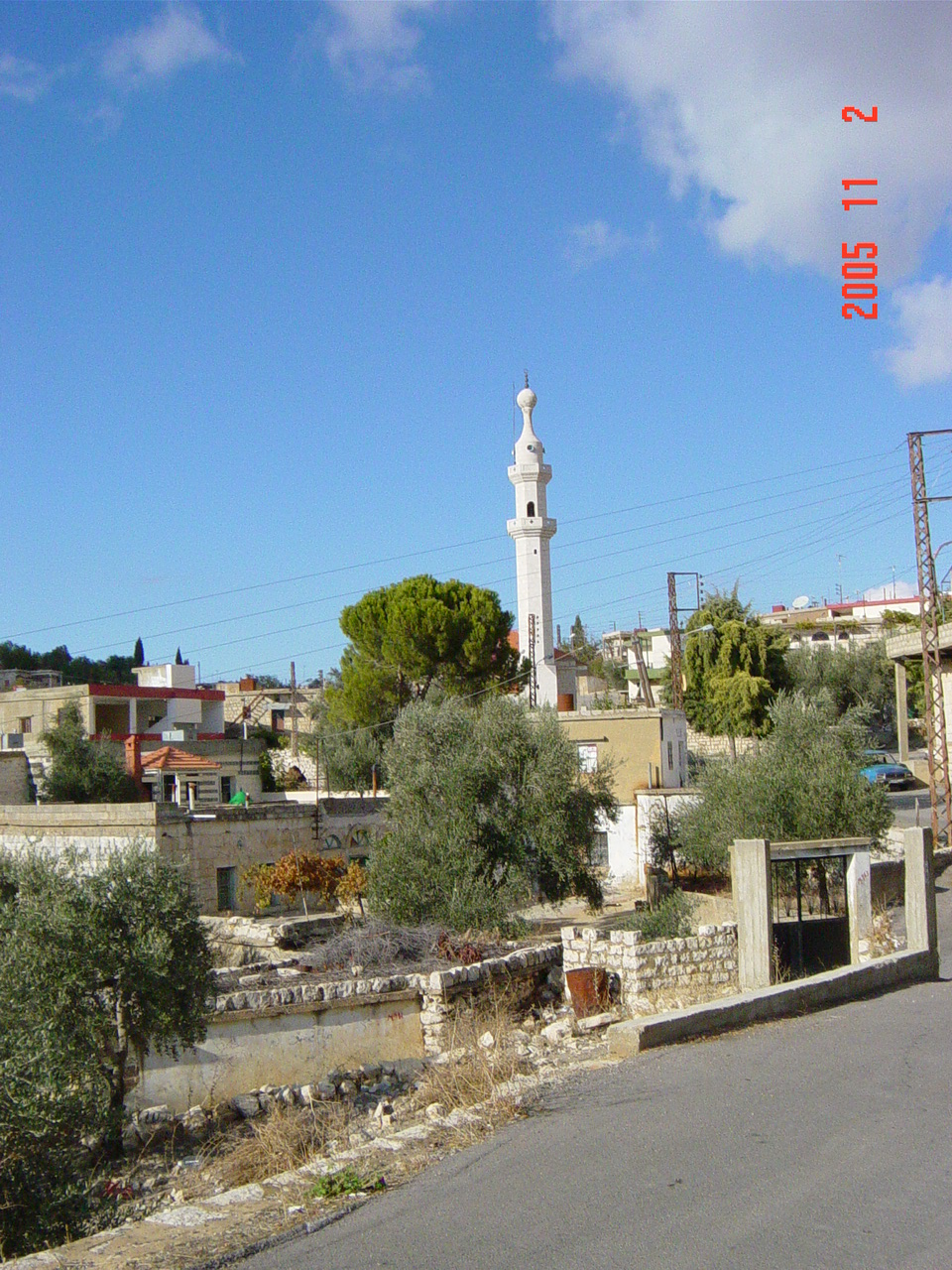
- Al-Bireh town center

- Location in Lebanon
- Coordinates: 33°35′02″N 35°49′09″E
- Country: Lebanon
- Governorate: Beqaa Governorate
- District: Rashaya District

Population
  - Total: 9,000+

Al-Bireh
- El Bire, El Bireh, Biré, Birra
- Location within Lebanon
- Periods: Heavy Neolithic, Neolithic
- Location: Beqaa Valley, Lebanon
- Part of: Settlement

Site notes
- Archaeologists: Auguste Bergy
- Condition: ruins
- Public access: Yes

Al-Bireh, El Bire, Biré, El Bireh (Levantine Arabic: البيرة, romanized: el-Bīrreh) or Birra (at the time of the Crusades) is a town in the Rashaya District, south-eastern portion of the Bekaa Governorate of the Republic of Lebanon. Al-Bireh is part of the Rashaya municipal district. It lies west of the road between Majdel Anjar and Rashaya. Its population is estimated to be 9000. It is a small Sunni Muslim town with two mosques and two schools.

== Geography ==
The oldest part of the town lies on top of Jabal Arbi Mountains while the newer parts lie in the Wadi al-Taym valley and is referred to as Izza. Neighboring towns include Rafid, Kamed, Khirbet-Rouha, and Mdouckha. The town is located about 80 km from Beirut and 40 km from Damascus, Syria.

== Economy ==
More than 60% of the town's population have emigrated to Brazil, Argentina, United States, Canada, France, Spain, Italy and Portugal. Residents of the town have left to the US as early as the 18th Century and have aggregated in cities like Dearborn, Michigan. Many others emigrated to São Paulo- Santo Amaro, Brazil; Buenos Aires, Argentina; Montreal, Quebec and Calgary, Alberta, Canada.

The economy of the town relies on agriculture. Eight main families inhabit the town, namely the Elkadri, Jeha (جحا), Bacha, Jumaa, Abou Hussein, Zeineddine, Abdallah, Salem and Omar families. Other families also live in the village, however increased emigration has completely dispersed some families and no members are currently residents.

== Notable residents ==
Al-Bireh is the birthplace of the late Nazim Elkadri(MP, minister and prime minister of Lebanon) who was born in Al-Bireh. The Mufti of Bekaa, Raouf Elkadri [] was also born in Al-Bireh. Nassouh Elkadri (an anti-French occupation revolutionary leader) was also from Al-Bireh.

== History ==
On April 26, 1697 Henry Maundrell Visited Rashaya And Visited the Village and Noted it as Uzzi (Izzeh) (A part in the Bireh )

Caves dating back to pre-historic times can be found all over the mountain. Ruins of other more modern civilizations are still visible. The locals usually come across artifacts dating back to Phoenician, Byzantine, Roman and Canaanite eras. Many artifacts and archaeological pieces were illegally excavated out of the caves and burial grounds.

In 1838, Eli Smith noted el-Bireh as a Sunni Muslim village in the Beqaa Valley.

1925 Ain Falouj Incident | Great Syrian Revolt

During the Great Syrian Revolt against the French Mandate, a notable battle took place near Ain Falouj, a site between Kamid al-Lawz and Al Bireh. Around 150 local Druze and allied mujahideen faced roughly 400 French-aligned troops. According to accounts from the time, the insurgents inflicted heavy losses on the opposing force, reportedly killing around 400 soldiers while suffering only seven fatalities. A man at the battle by the name of Hassan Shams later recounted:

“We were 114 mujahideen with rifles, plus six fighters without weapons. At evening, we reached Ain Falouj, and the forces were divided into groups, with most positioned on the western side, as it was wider. The fog was dense, and the land was planted with barley. When we were there, a group from Kamid al-Lawz came to harvest the barley, and we pushed them east. At dawn, a reconnaissance force unexpectedly arrived from the north, occupying a higher position. We were unsure how to reach a position from where we could face them. Suddenly, the fog returned thickly, allowing us to move and take suitable positions. Then a plane came and dropped leaflets announcing the arrival of an army from the south. Indeed, the army arrived, and the soldiers lined up for salute. We opened fire with 114 magazines of bullets before they could aim their rifles. The battle lasted three and a half hours, and we had to withdraw when shooting came from the east toward us. We learned that those harvesters from Kamid al-Lawz we had pushed east had reached the Hammara police station and informed on us. We feared encirclement and retreated.”

The town was occupied first by PLO forces in the late 1970s, then by Israeli forces in the early 1980s..

Al Birehs Izzi Part was Home to The kidnapped IDF soldiers in the Bhamdoun abduction operation

== Archaeology ==
A Heavy Neolithic archaeological site of the Qaraoun culture was discovered by Auguste Bergy along a south to west track that lead from the road to a small spring. Bergy originally suggested it was a "Chellean factory site" before the Heavy Neolithic was defined by Henri Fleisch. Lorraine Copeland agreed that it was probably a factory, noting several prepared flakes and a large Neolithic pick. The material is now held in the archives of the Saint Joseph University.

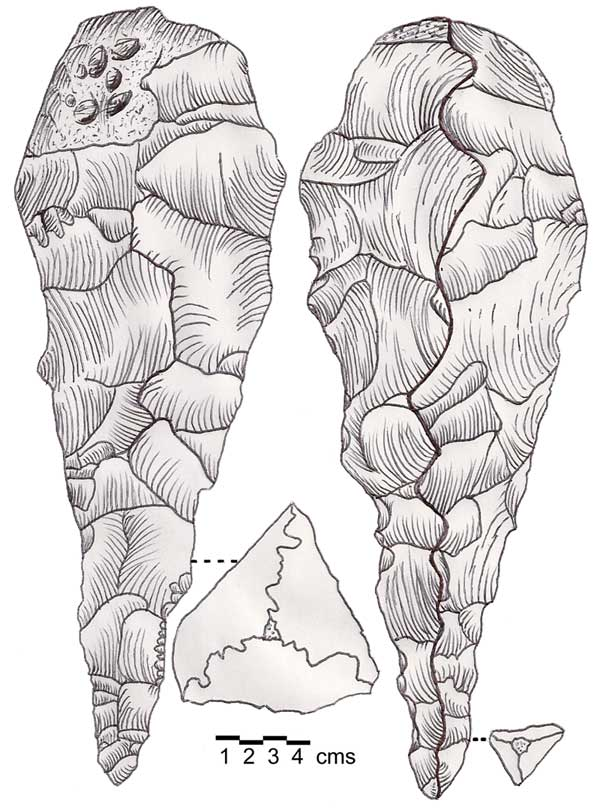
Trihedral Neolithic axe or pick from Joub Jannine II, Lebanon. Cream flint patinated to brown. In the collection of the Museum of Lebanese Prehistory at the Saint Joseph University, Beirut, Lebanon.

== Media ==
Al-Bireh was the site where the French/Lebanese movie Le Cerf-Volant (The Kite) (Tayyara min waraq) was filmed.

In January 2009 a street in town was named after president Hugo Chávez, after Venezuela expelled an Israeli ambassador due IDF attack in Gaza Strip.

In the Lebanese Parliamentary elections of June 2009, Ziad Nazem Elkadri, son of the late Nazim Elkadri, won his seat running with the Future Movement in the March 14 coalition list. Ziad is the second MP to be elected from the village, the first being his father.

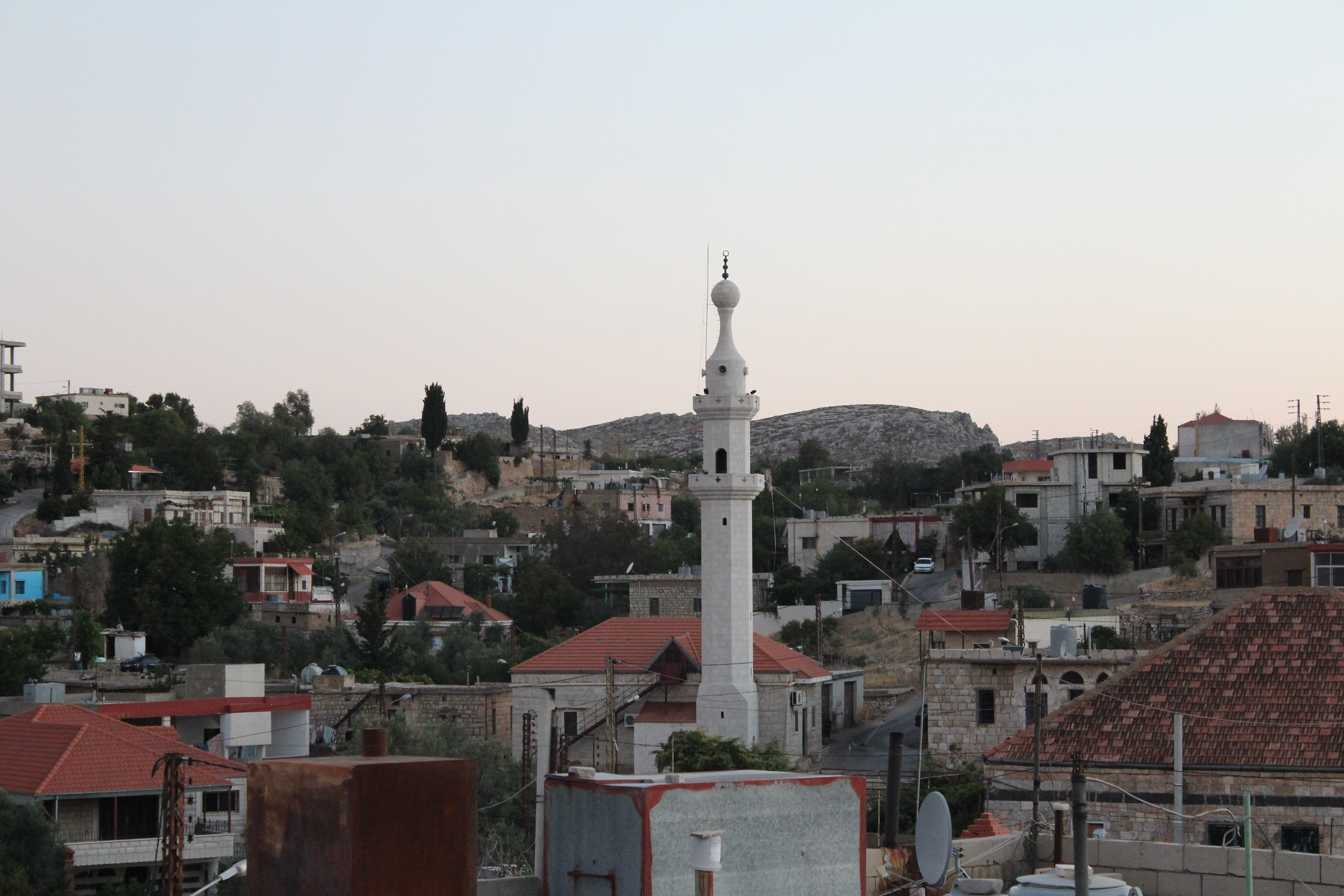
View of Al-Bireh.

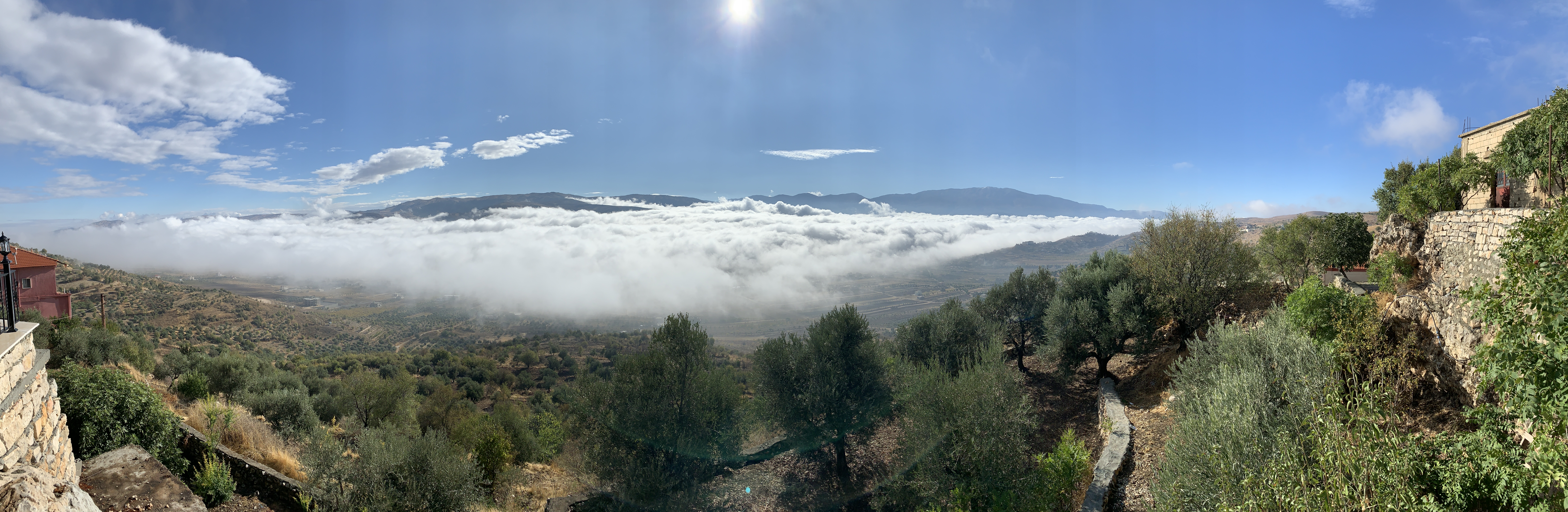
Al-Birah - Looking East. Mount Hermon or Jabal Alshaikh can be seen in the distance.

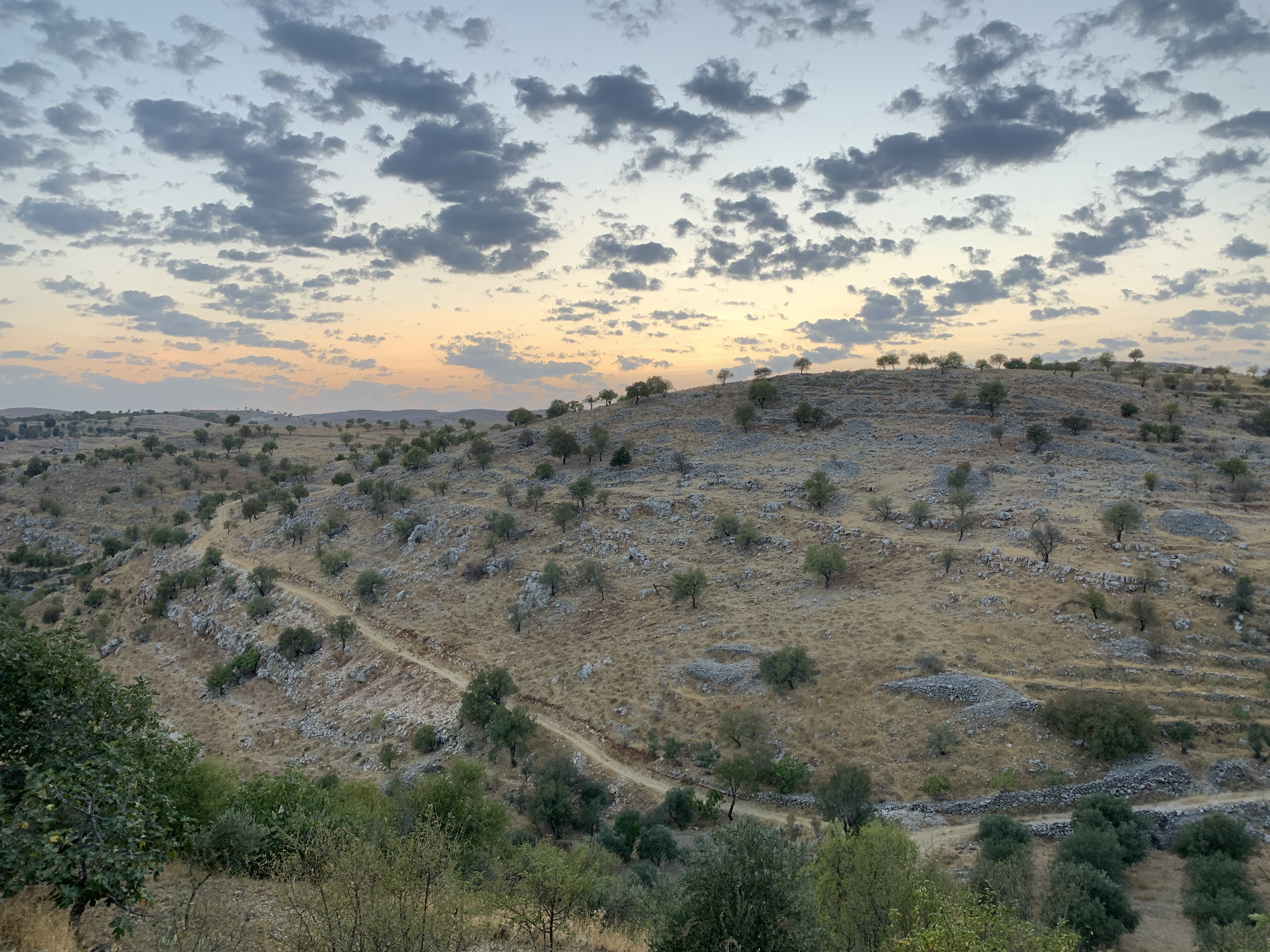
Areed Alhawa

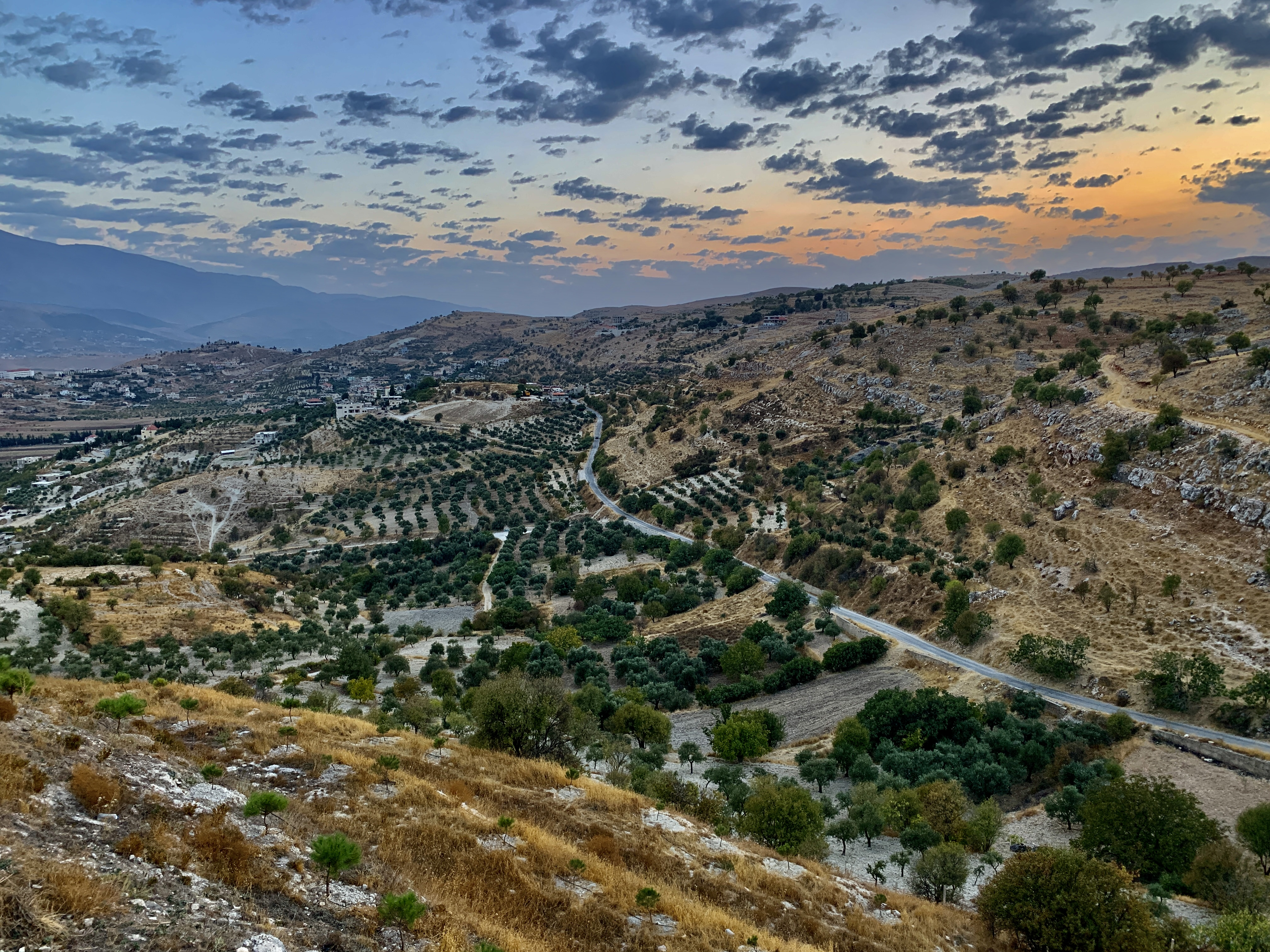
Al Bireh looking south

== Gallery ==
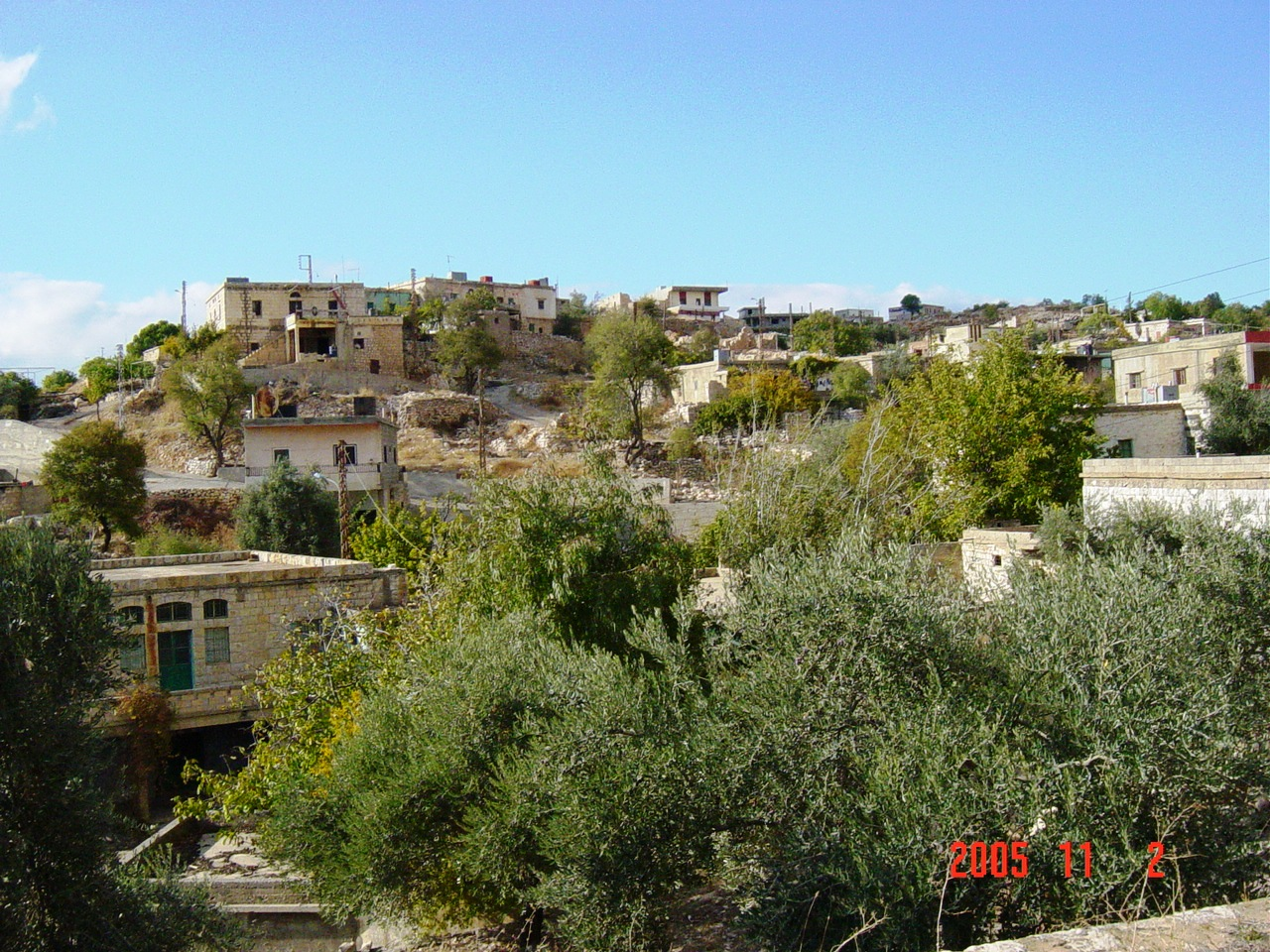
Many homes were abandoned due to emigration

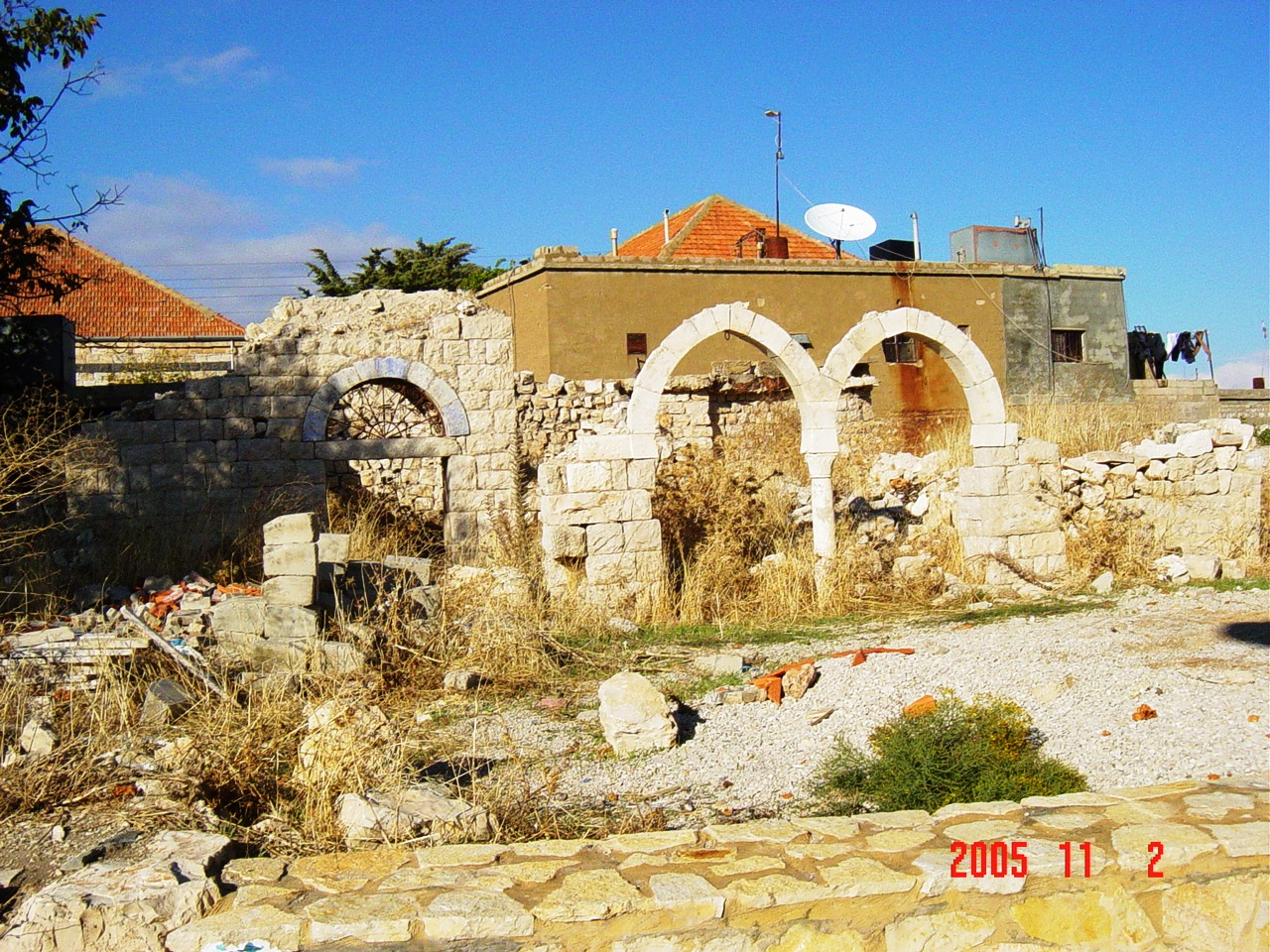
The Elkadri family ruins

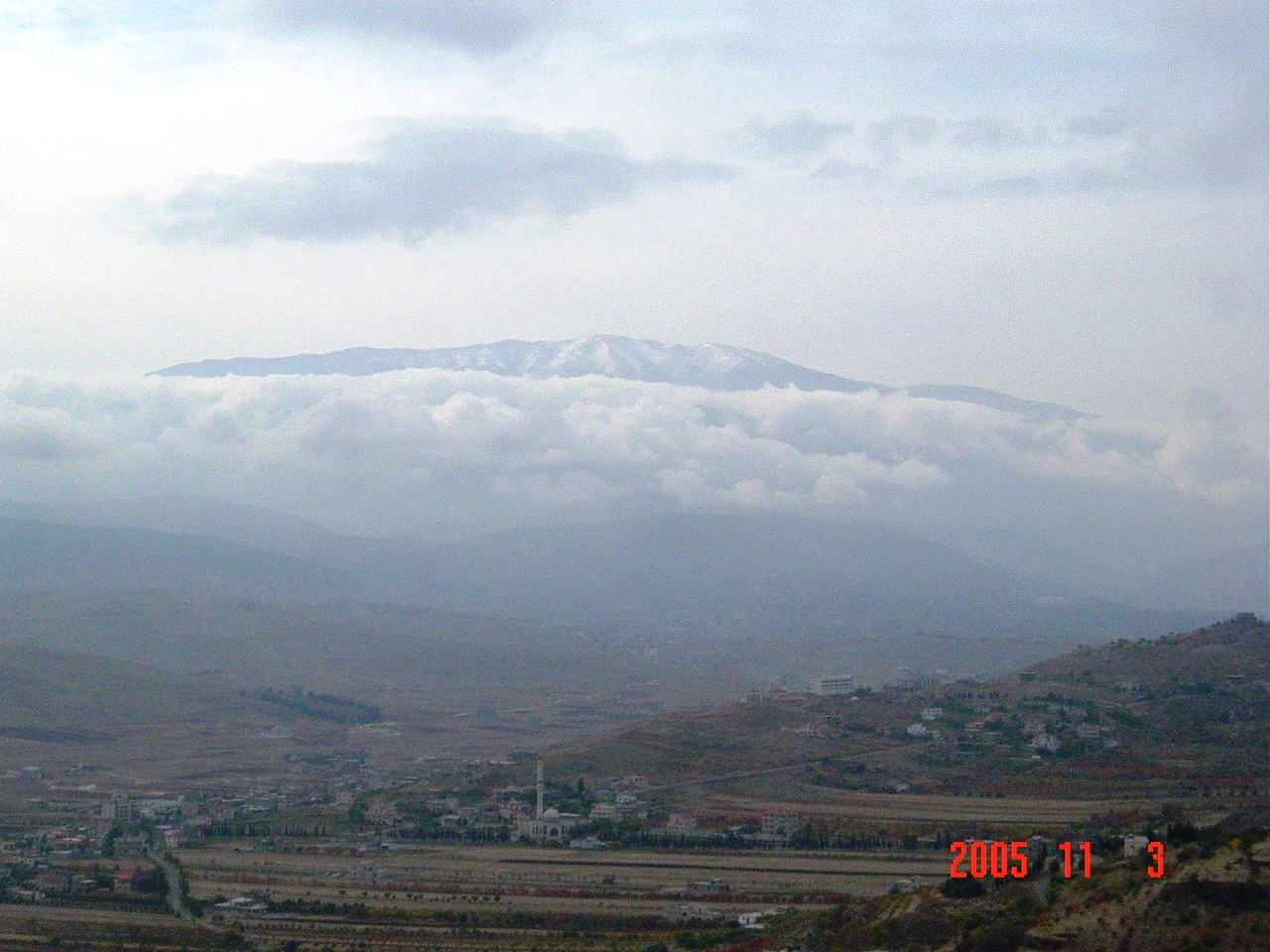
Mount Hermon or Alsheikh as seen from Al-Bireh

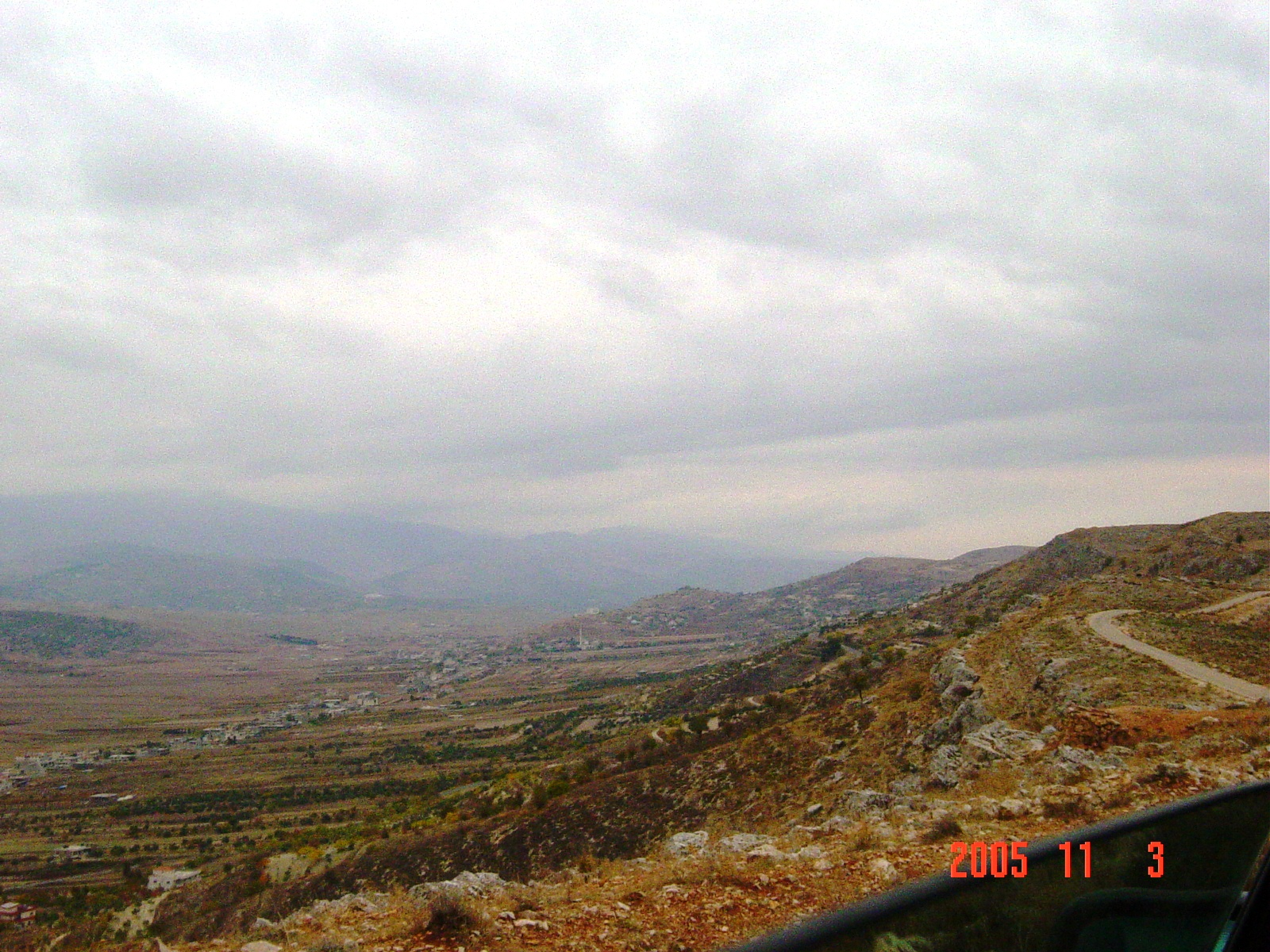
Agriculture thrives in the water rich mountains

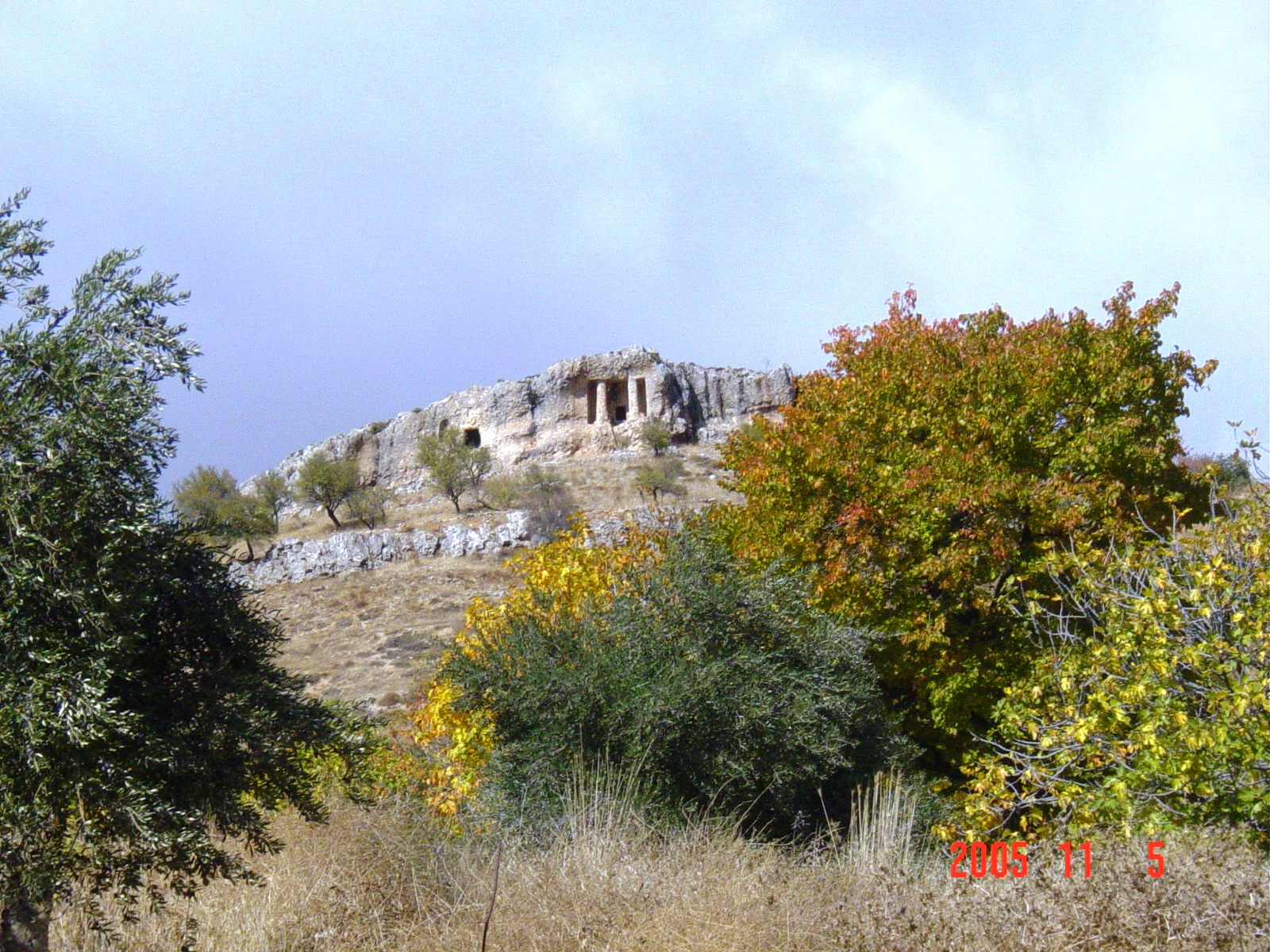
Ancient caves known as Ain Almizrab Caves

== Bibliography ==
- Robinson, E.; Smith, E. (1841). Biblical Researches in Palestine, Mount Sinai and Arabia Petraea: A Journal of Travels in the year 1838. Vol. 3. Boston: Crocker & Brewster.
