= Rafid =

Rafid may refer to:

== People ==
- Rafid Badr Al-Deen (born 1976), Iraqi football player
- Rafid Lestaluhu (born 1993), Indonesian professional footballer
- Rafid al-Sabti (born 1965), Iraqi-Dutch Mandaean priest
- Rafid Topan Sucipto (born 1994), Indonesian motorcycle racer

== Places ==
- Al-Rafid, Lebanon
- Al-Rafid, Syria
