= Mdoukha =

Mdoukha مذوخا
- Village
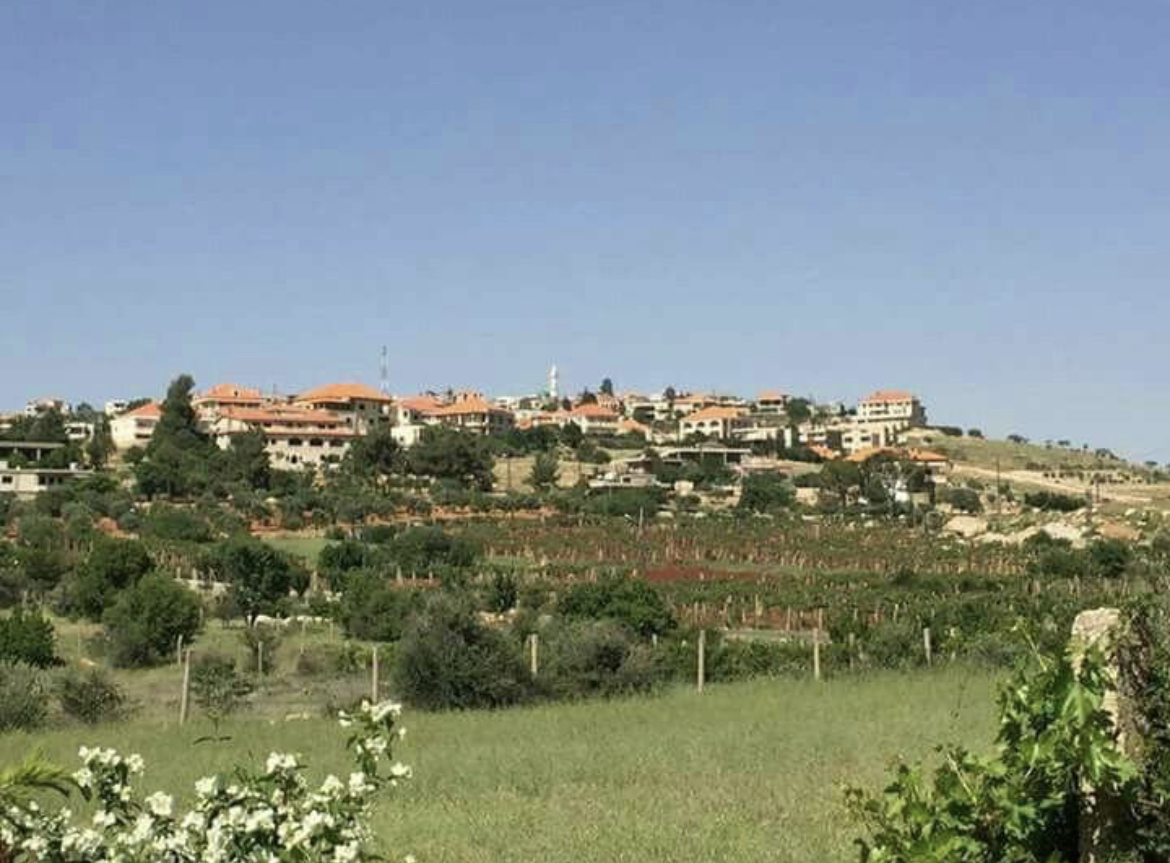
- Mdoukha in the spring
- Interactive map of Mdoukha
- Country: Lebanon
- Governorate: Beqaa
- District: Rashaya

Area
  - Total: 5.86 sq mi (15.18 km^{2})
- Elevation: 3,615 ft (1,102 m)

Population
  - Total (including expatriates, estimated): 3,300
  - Living in Mdoukha (estimated): <400

Mdoukha (Arabic: مذوخا, romanized: Mdūkhā) is a village and municipality 72 kilometres (45 mi) east of Beirut in the Rashaya District, Beqaa Governorate, Lebanon. A significant majority of the population is considered to be Lebanese Canadian, with 60% living in London, Ontario. Most of the population identifies as Sunni Muslim.

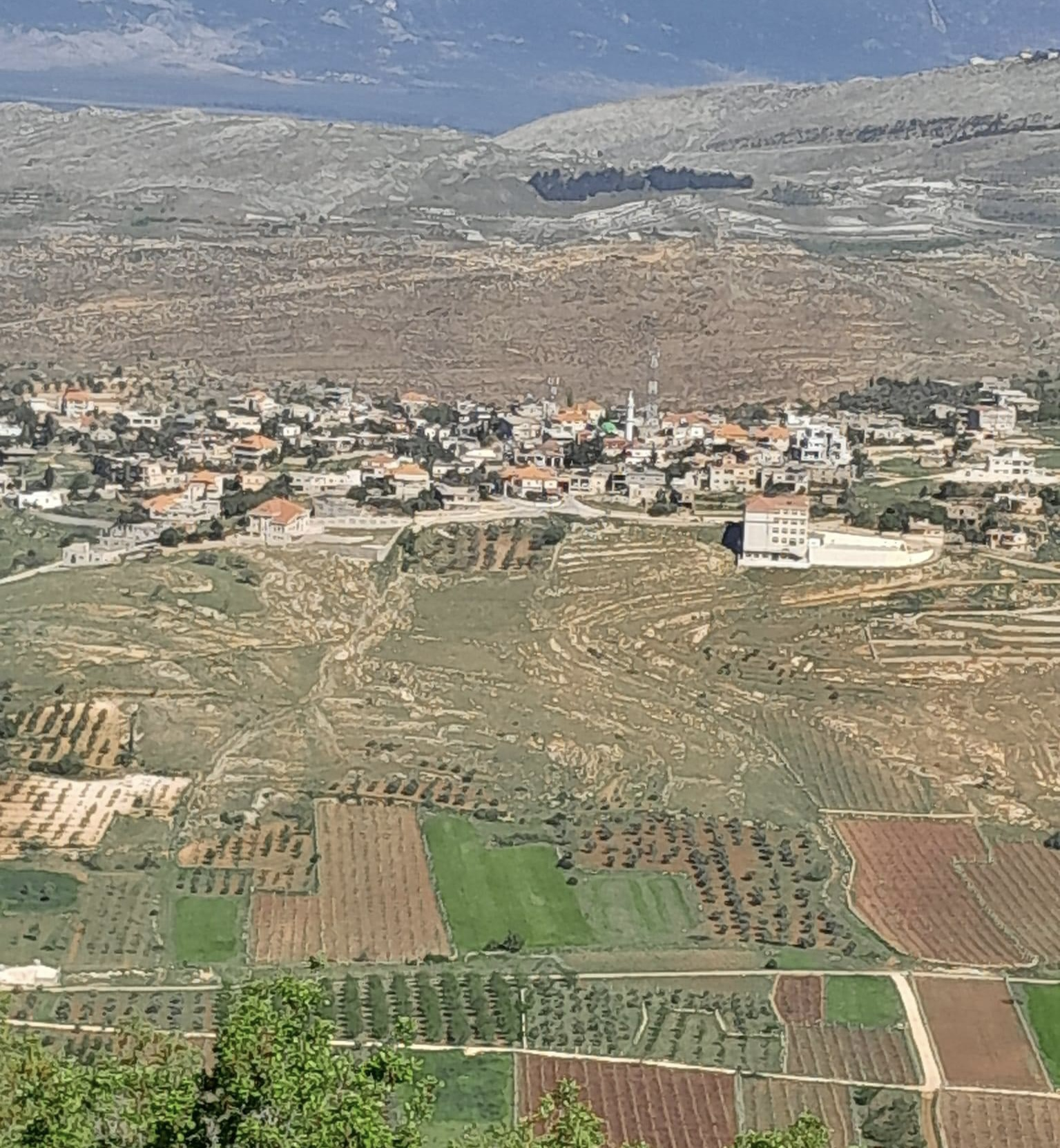
View of Mdoukha from Mount Qsair to the south of the town.

Mdoukha lies at the foothills of Mount Hermon (which can be seen from many different points in and around the town) in the Rashaya District of the Beqaa Valley, about 15 kilometres northwest of Mount Hermon, and 72 kilometres east of Beirut. It sits 1102 metres above sea level. Villages surrounding Mdoukha include Ain Arab, Al-Bireh, Al-Rafid, Bakka, Kfardenis, and Kherbet Rouha.

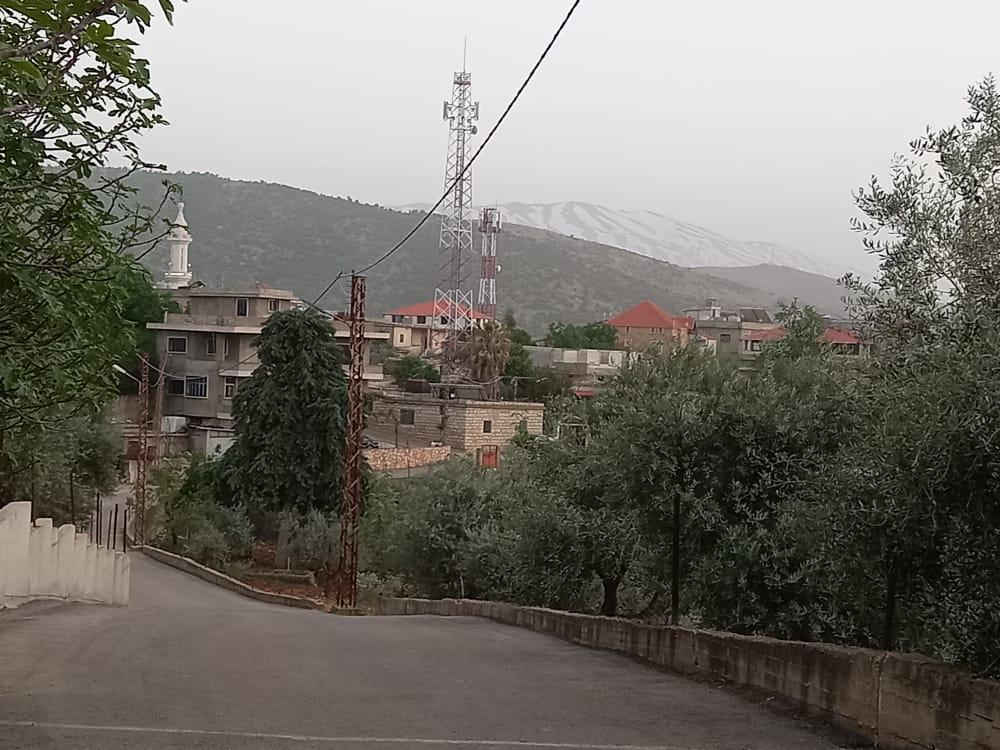
A view of the town from the northern end with the snow-capped Anti-Lebanon mountains visible in the distance.

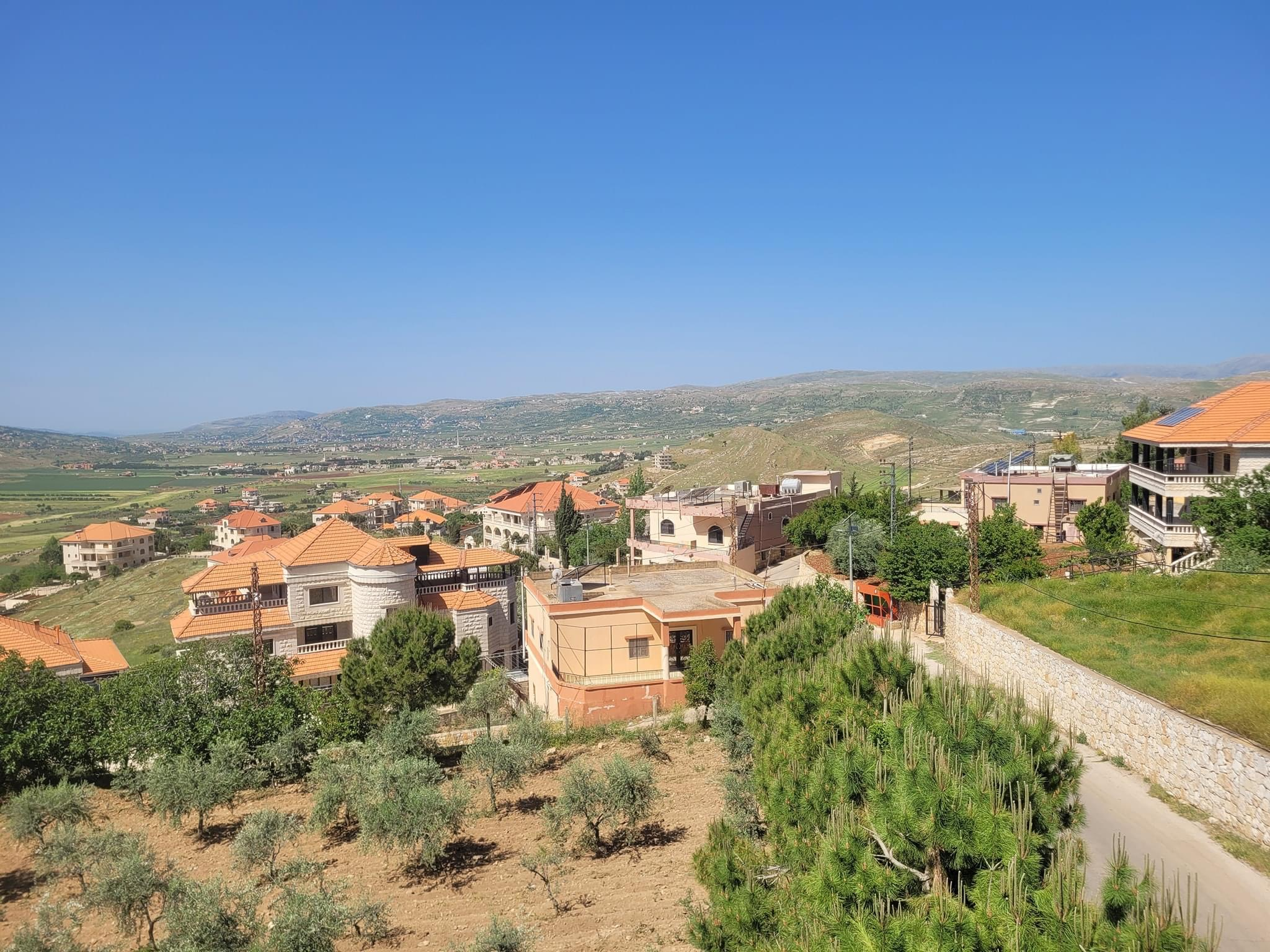
Entrance to Mdoukha from the southwest, along the main Bire road connecting the town to the rest of the province.

Mdoukha has historically been a farming town. It is home to the K-6 Mdoukha Public Elementary School as well as a small park just outside the town.

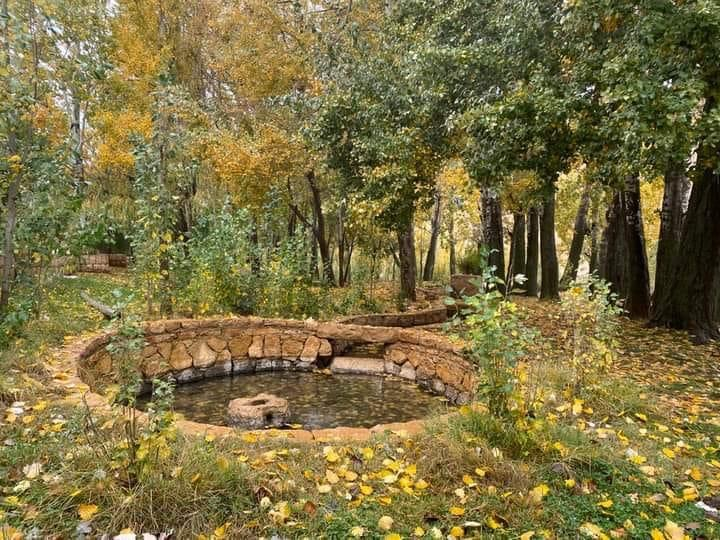
Ayn Qenya, a local park outside Mdoukha to the northeast maintained by the town.

On the nearby Mount Qsair, there are ruins.

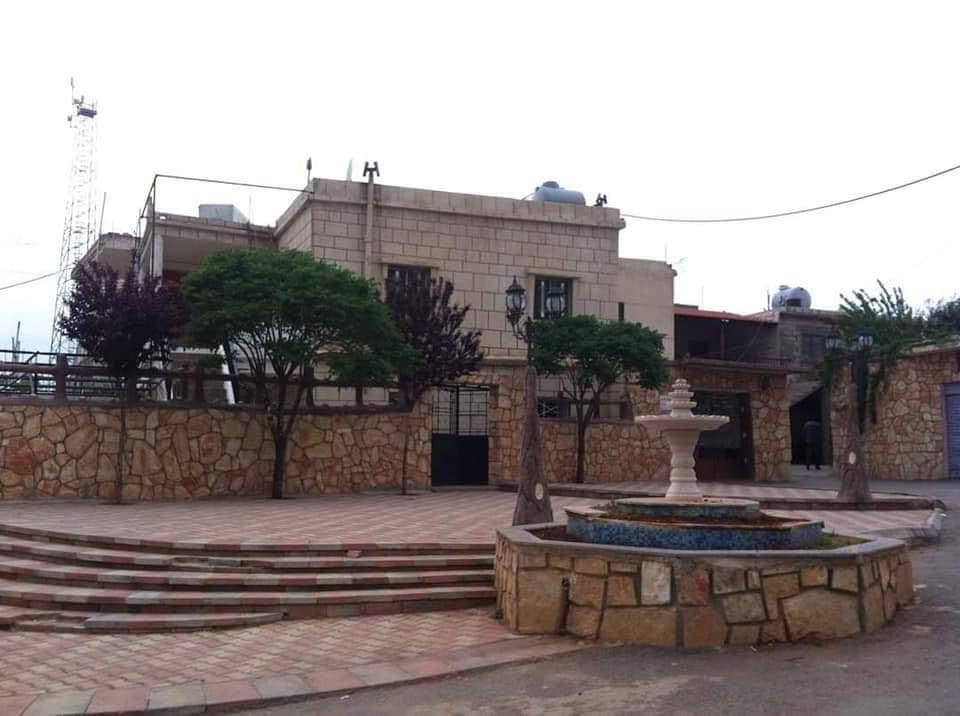
Northwest corner of Mdoukha’s town square.

No official census data is available, as is the case for the rest of the country, however locals and expatriates estimate Mdoukha's population to be approximately 10000 people, of which the majority lives in London, Ontario.
