= Al-Rafid, Lebanon =

Al-Rafid الرفيد Al-Rafeed
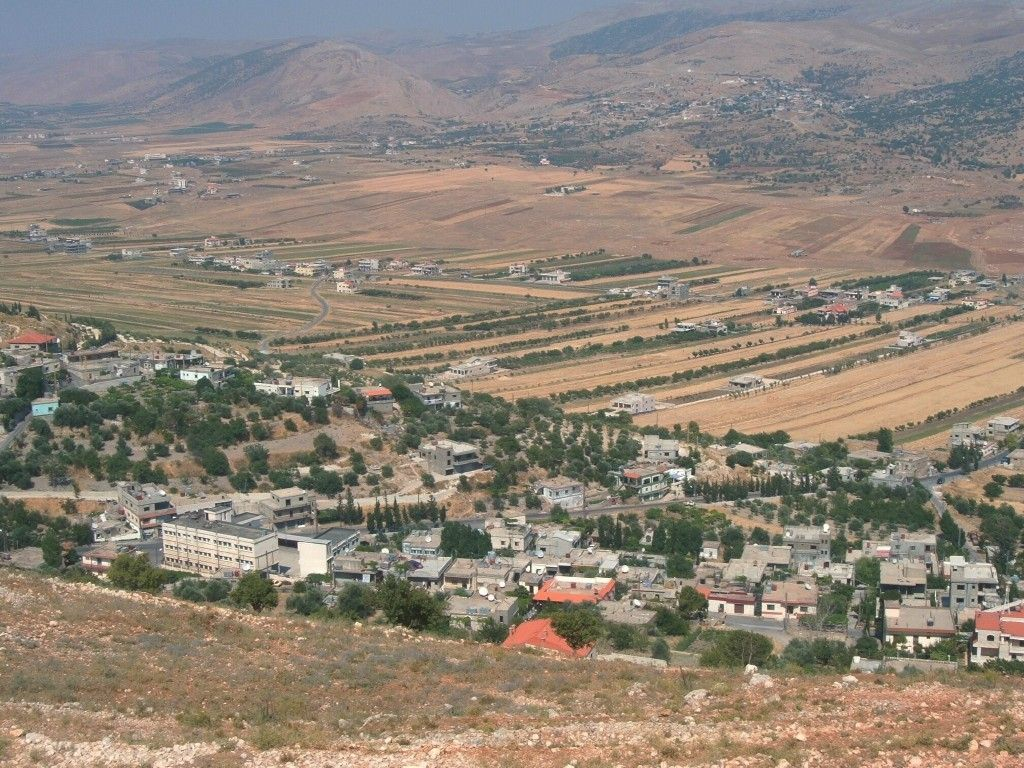
- View of the northeastern part of al-Rafid

- Location in Lebanon
- Coordinates: 33°34′16″N 35°49′1″E
- Lebanon: Lebanon
- Governorate: Beqaa
- District: Rashaya

Population
  - Total: 3,000

Al-Rafid (Arabic: الرفيد, romanized: ar-Rafīd or Rafid) is a village in the Rashaya District, in the southeastern area of the Beqaa Governorate in Lebanon. Its population is estimated to be 3,000. Its inhabitants are predominantly Sunni Muslims. The village has two mosques, two schools, two pharmacies, and a telecommunications facility.

== Geography ==
The village is situated at an elevation of approximately 1,100 metres above sea level and extends across an area characterized by a mix of residential and agricultural land.

The oldest part of the village lies halfway up Mount Baaloul (Jabal Baaloul) on the eastern slope. It is widely accepted by the inhabitants of the town that the town was originally located on the top of the mountain but was re-located after a civil strife had subsided over 400 years ago. Neighboring localities include Bire, Kherbet Rouha, and Mdoukha. The town is located about 80 km (50 mi) from Beirut and 40 km (25 mi) from Damascus, Syria.

Al‑Rafid lies within a region of long-standing human settlement associated with the slopes of Mount Hermon (Jabal al‑Shaykh), the highest peak in the Anti‑Lebanon mountain range. The mountain, which forms part of the Lebanon–Syria border, has held geographical and historical significance since antiquity and is referenced in ancient sources as a prominent landmark. It also had religious importance in antiquity, as reflected in archaeological remains such as temples and shrines found on and around its slopes. These sites, together with broader archaeological findings in the Mount Hermon highlands, indicate continuous habitation and cultural activity in the surrounding region.

The surrounding area forms part of the Beqaa Valley, one of Lebanon’s principal agricultural regions, characterized by fertile soils, diverse microclimates, and significant levels of cultivated land. Agricultural production in the wider region includes grapes, olives, and a variety of fruit crops, reflecting Lebanon’s diversified farming systems and favorable growing conditions. The Rashaya District in particular has a long-standing tradition of viticulture, supported by a Mediterranean climate with conditions well suited to grapevine cultivation.

== History ==
In 1838, the American biblical scholar Eli Smith recorded Al‑Rafid as an inhabited village with a predominantly Sunni Muslim population. Its inclusion in Smith’s survey indicates that it was an established rural settlement during the Ottoman period. The identification of a predominantly Sunni population reflects the sectarian composition of parts of the Rashaya region in the 19th century and suggests a degree of demographic stability in the village at that time.

During the early 1970s, Al‑Rafid was affected by regional conflict. A 1972 report in The New York Times described casualties in the village following an aerial bombing, highlighting the impact of cross‑border hostilities on rural communities in the Rashaya area.

The village was occupied first by PLO forces in the late 1970s Inhabited by the PFLP, then by Israeli forces in the early 1980s.At least three people have been killed by Israeli airstrikes on the village, one on 30 September 2024, one on 5 October 2024, and one on 22 May 2026.

== Bibliography ==
- Robinson, E.; Smith, E. (1841). Biblical Researches in Palestine, Mount Sinai and Arabia Petraea: A Journal of Travels in the year 1838. Vol. 3. Boston: Crocker & Brewster.
