= Alsheikh =

Alsheikh is a surname. Notable people with the surname include:

- Moshe Alsheikh (1508–1593), Ottoman rabbi
- Ola Alsheikh, Sudanese photographer
- Roni Alsheikh (born 1963), Israeli policeman

== See also ==
- Al-Sheikh (surname)
- Ras Alsheikh Hamid
