= Kherbet Rouha =

Kherbet Rouha خربة روحا
- Village
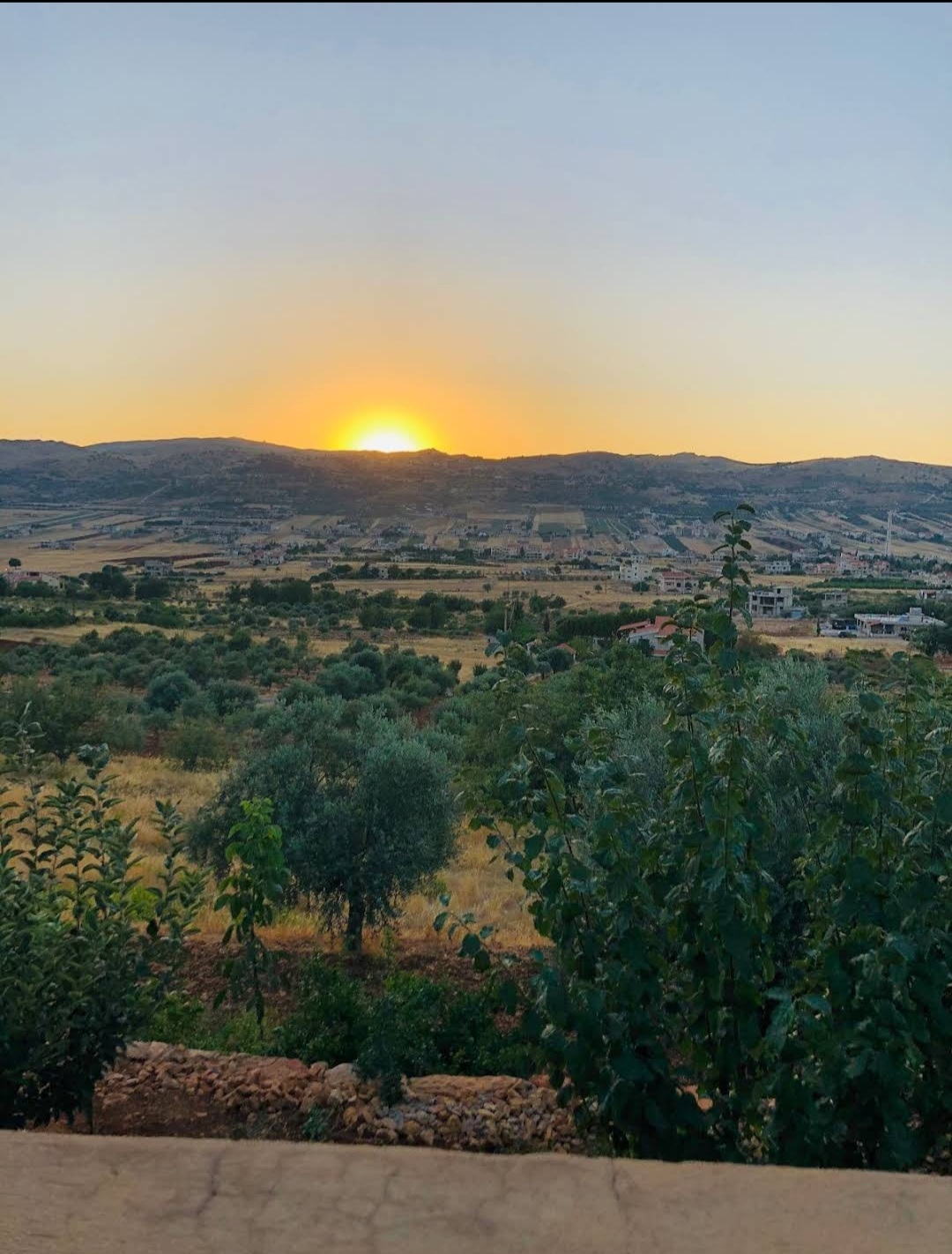
- Kherbet Rouha

- Location in Lebanon
- Coordinates: 33°34′21″N 35°51′11″E
- Country: Lebanon
- Governorate: Beqaa Governorate
- District: Rashaya District

Government
  - Type: Mayor–council government
  - President: Marwan Hajar
  - Vice President: Abdelhafiz Hammoud

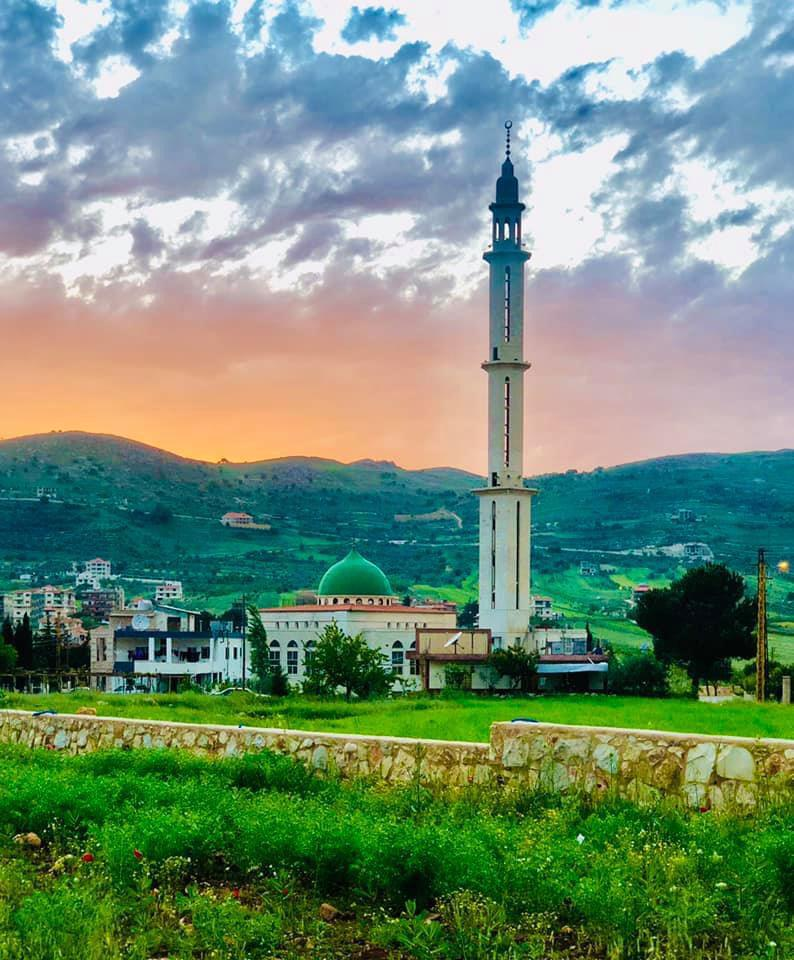

Kherbet Rouha (Levantine Arabic: خربة روحا, romanized: Kherbet Rūḥā) is a town in the Rashaya District of Lebanon. It lies in the Bekaa Valley, about 10 kilometres (6 mi) northwest of Mount Hermon. The town is known for having the largest mosque towers in Lebanon (tallest minaret: 100 m or 330 ft in height).

People from Kherbet Rouha have migrated to many points around the world, mainly Canada, United States, Brazil, and UAE. In Canada, most families originating from Kherbet Rouha are represented in Edmonton, Alberta and Calgary, Alberta,. North America also has many citizens from Kherbet Rouha that live in other cities such as Lac La Biche, Windsor, Woodstock, London, Winnipeg, Toronto and Dearborn, Michigan. There is also a small group of early immigrants to the United States who settled in the Turtle Mountain region of North Dakota. Several families still remain there almost a century later. It is still possible to visit one of the oldest Islamic cemeteries in the United States in Dunseith, North Dakota, with tombstones dating back to the early 20th century. There is no mayor.

== Etymology ==
The name Kherbet Rouha literally translates to mean "broken soul". A legend says the village originally was named Madinat Al Rouha'a, which translates to mean the City of Souls, but many wars and natural disasters "broke" the village seven times giving it a broken soul. It is also believed that the meaning of Kherbet Rouha is of Aramaic origin, Kherbet meaning "ruins" and Rouha meaning "spirit" making the translation of the name to "Ruins of the Spirit”.

== Origins and early settlement ==
Kherbet Rouha is located in the Beqaa Valley, a region with evidence of continuous human occupation from the Neolithic period through the Bronze and Iron Ages and into later historical eras. Archaeological research across the Beqaa Valley indicates long-standing agricultural and settlement activity, although no dedicated excavation has been published specifically for the modern village site."Site Preservation and Loss at the Bekaa Valley, Lebanon".

The name of the village appears to derive from Semitic linguistic elements — with 'kherbe' meaning “ruins” and 'rouha' referring to wind or spaciousness — suggesting that the settlement may have been established near or on older ruins in the landscape."Lebanese Villages: Their Meanings & Roots".

The earliest documentary evidence of Kherbet Rouha as a named community comes from the Mamluk Scholar Burhan Al Din Al Bīqai & Ottoman tax records between 1533 and 1548, when it was listed as part of the Nāḥiyah of Shouf al-Bayda with approximately 90 households."Ottoman Registers (1533–1548)".

== Geography ==
Kherbet Rouha is located in the Rashaya District of the Beqaa Governorate in eastern Lebanon, approximately 10 kilometres northwest of Mount Hermon and close to the Lebanese–Syrian border. The village lies at an elevation of approximately 1,100–1,150 metres (3,600–3,775 feet) above sea level in the western Beqaa highlands. It is bordered by Bire and Rafid to the west, Kfar Danis to the south, Mdoukha to the north, and Ain Arab to the northeast, forming part of a cluster of highland agricultural communities near the Anti-Lebanon range.

Historically, settlement was concentrated along the mountainside, where homes were constructed against natural rock formations, while the flat valley land below was reserved for cultivation. This traditional land-use pattern preserved fertile soil for wheat, legumes, vineyards, and orchards while providing defensive advantage and protection from seasonal flooding.

== History ==
Kherbet Rouha forms part of the historical landscape of the Beqaa Valley, a region long inhabited due to its fertile agricultural land and strategic location between the Lebanon and Anti-Lebanon mountain ranges.

=== Early history and archaeological context ===
Although systematic archaeological excavation within Kherbet Rouha itself has been limited, the Beqaa Valley contains evidence of continuous settlement from prehistoric periods through Roman and Islamic eras.

Stone-cut olive and grape presses, wells, and carved basins found in and around the village indicate long-standing agricultural activity, consistent with broader patterns of settlement in the western Beqaa highlands.

=== Medieval and Mamluk period ===
Kherbet Rouha was the birthplace of the 15th-century Islamic scholar Burhan al-Din al-Biqaʿi (1407–1480), a noted Qur’anic exegete and historian of the Mamluk period.

In his autobiographical writings, al-Biqaʿi recounts an episode of local conflict in 821 AH (1418 CE) in which several members of his family were killed and he himself was wounded. Following this incident, he left the village and continued his studies in Jerusalem and Damascus, later becoming known for his contributions to Qur’anic scholarship.

=== Ottoman era ===
Kherbet Rouha appeared in Ottoman tax registers between 1533 and 1548 as part of the nāḥiyah (subdistrict) of Shouf al-Bayda in the Beqaa Valley. The registers recorded approximately 90 households, the majority of whom were Sunni Muslim.

In 1838, the American scholar Eli Smith documented the village as being inhabited by both Sunni Muslims and Christians.

=== Modern period ===
In 1974, Palestinian leader Yasser Arafat visited Kherbet Rouha during a period of increased Palestinian armed presence in the Beqaa Valley. During the Lebanese Civil War, armed factions operated in parts of the region, including areas near the village. The town later experienced military activity during Israeli operations in the Beqaa in the 1980s.

== Infrastructure ==
=== Agriculture ===
Kherbet Rouha's land is both on the mountain side and in the valley. Until recently, most of Kherbet Rouha's occupants lived off of their land. The majority of the valley's land was used for growing wheat, chickpeas (hummus), lentils, sunflower, cucumbers, and sometimes a local breed of watermelons which don't grow very large, but are brighter red inside with a thin shell and have few but much-larger-than-usual seeds. The mountain land is usually used to grow trees and vine fruits because of the difficulty with plowing inclined land. The most common are figs, olives, grapes, quince and sumac.

Traditionally, many people kept livestock as well, most homes until as recent as the early 80s had a donkey or two for transportation. When a home kept livestock, they had a large flock of goats, sheep or a combination, or they had one or two cows and a few chickens and instead focused on their agriculture. Due to the geography of the land, it is still difficult to plow many of the olive and fig orchards and grape vineyards so traditional methods utilizing animals is common place.

Due to its conservative Muslim Sunni background, the owners of grape vineyards never sold their grapes for wine production no matter how financially strapped they were. Instead, many made raisins and a grape syrup known as "dibis" to sell.

To preserve agriculture, the villagers built their homes on the mountain side, and in many cases used the mountain as a wall of the house and left the valley land for farming. In recent years, as former immigrants returned home, there was a shortage of living space, and homes have become more commonly built in the valley land. Very few citizens still farm their land.

=== Education ===
In the past 10–15 years, and due to the recently built universities in the area, the youth in the village have become more ambitious with regards to their studies, and the number of university graduates is growing each year. There has been a "westernization" of village life as people focus on the industrialized job market and earn higher degrees.

=== Commerce ===
Many new apartment buildings have been built with rental and ownership options, most commonly buildings are built with multi-purpose to increase revenue and the first floor general are made up of retail and service rental units, the second floor houses medical and professional offices and any other consecutive floors contain residential apartments for rent or purchase.

== Bibliography ==
- Robinson, E.; Smith, E. (1841). Biblical Researches in Palestine, Mount Sinai and Arabia Petraea: A Journal of Travels in the year 1838. Vol. 3. Boston: Crocker & Brewster.

== Gallery ==
1970s -1980s

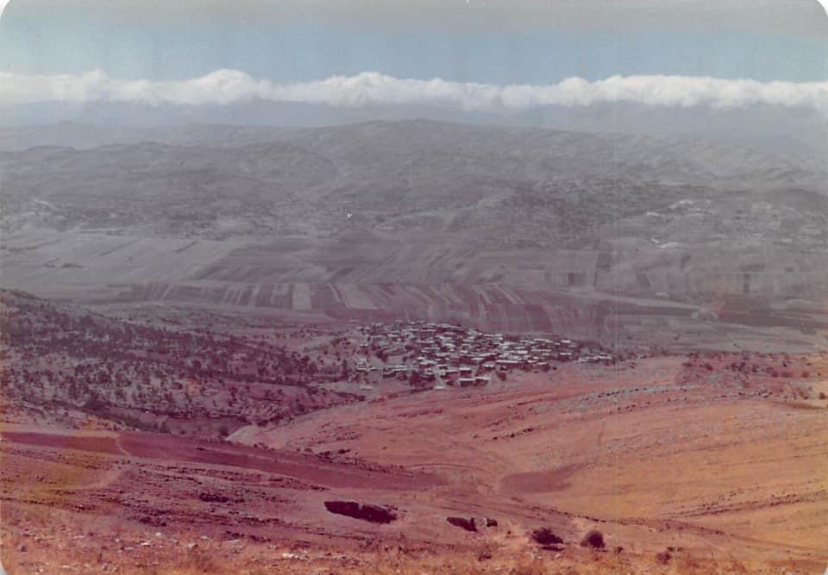
The town seen from Reiman Hill in the Mid 1970s

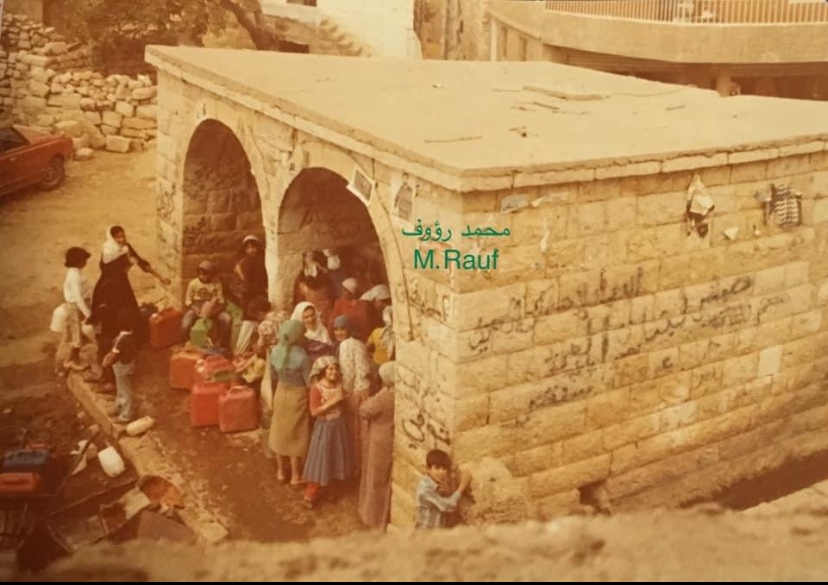
The Ain in 1980

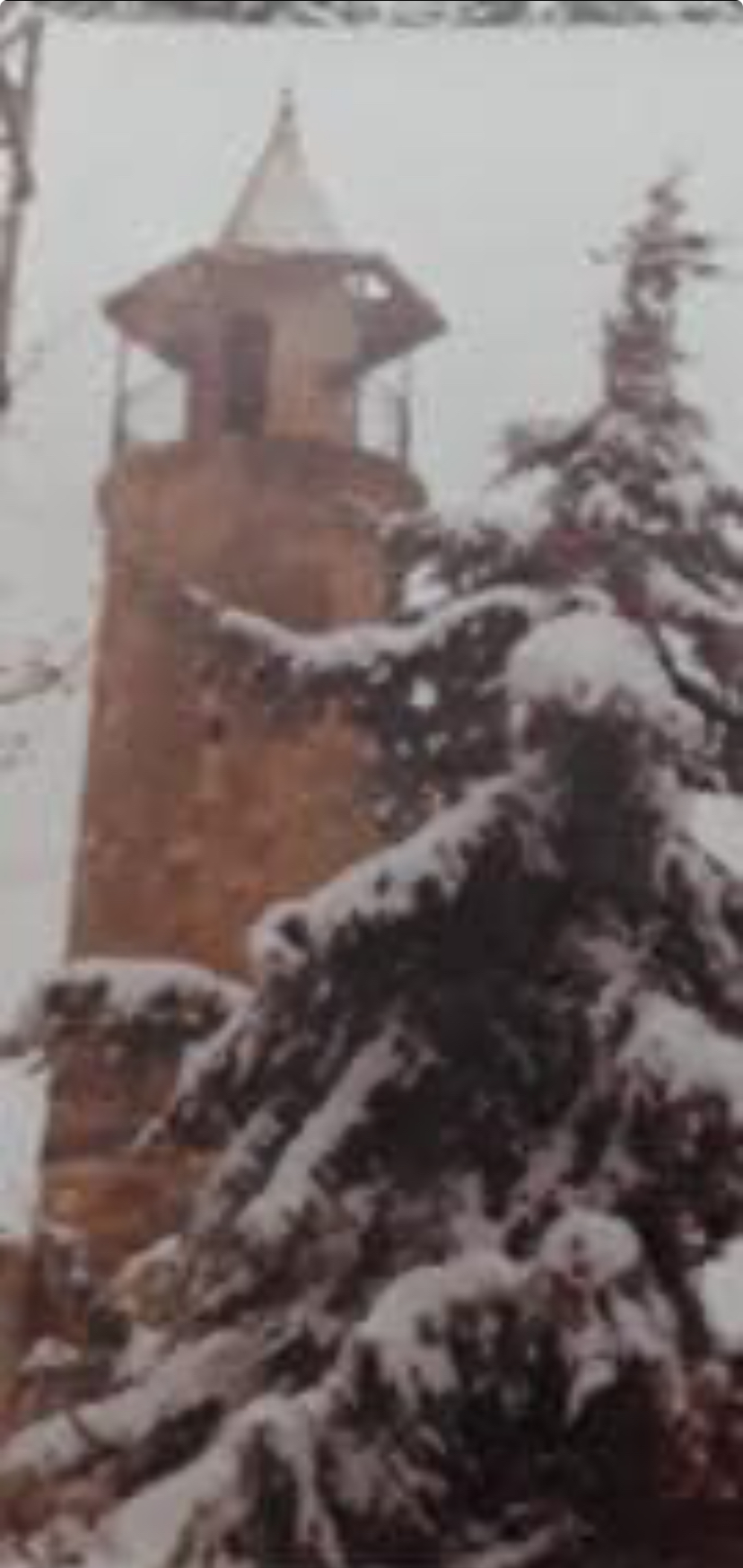
The minaret of kherbet rouha in the late 1970s

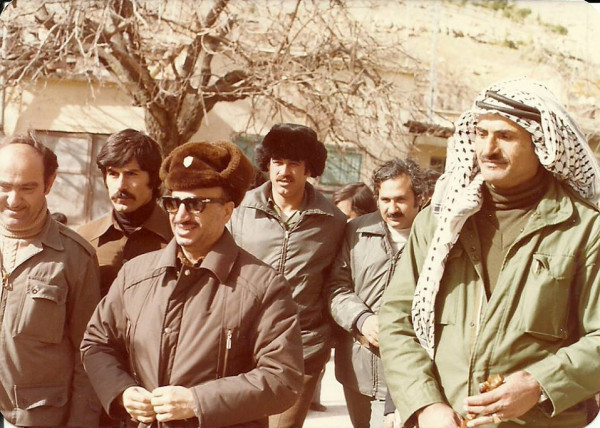
Yasser Arafat in Khirbet Rouha
