= Habib-i Nejjar Mosque =

13th-century Mamluk-era mosque in Antakya, Hatay Province, Turkey

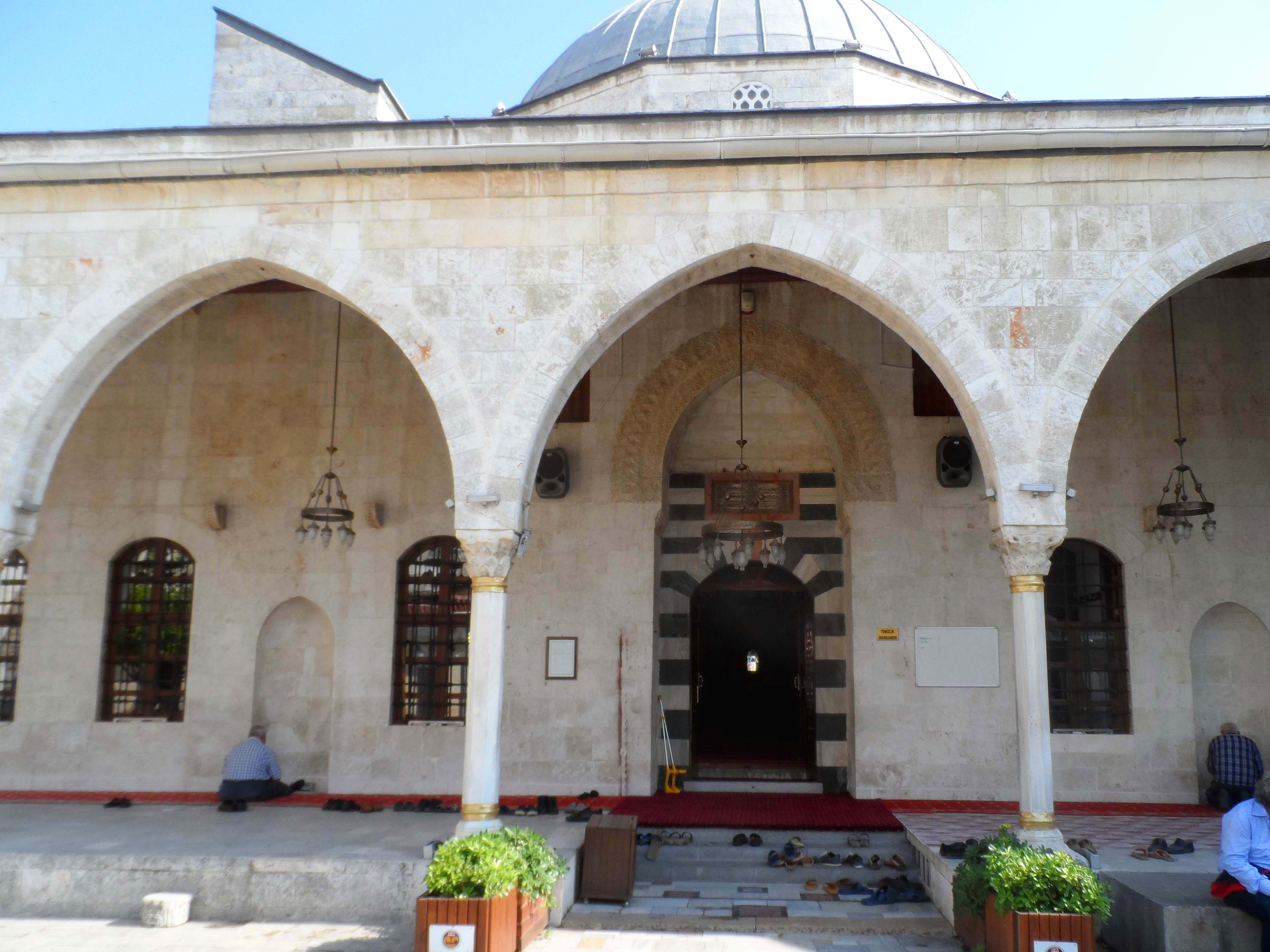

- Turkey

Religion
- Affiliation: Islam

Location
- Location: Antakya, Hatay, Turkey
- Coordinates: 36°2′N 36°10′E

Architecture
- Type: Mosque

Habib-i Nejjar Mosque is a historic mosque in Antakya, Hatay Province, Turkey named after Habib the Carpenter. The mosque is to the east of Orontes River (Turkish: Asi). It was severely damaged by earthquakes in February 2023.

== History ==
In antiquity, there was most probably a pagan temple in place of the current mosque. During the Christian era, it was converted into a church named after John the Baptist. In the Medieval Age, the city was captured first by the Rashidun Caliphate in 637, by the Byzantine Empire in 969, by the Seljuk Turks in 1084, by the Crusaders in 1098, and by the Baibars of the Mamluk Sultanate in 1268. Consequently, after each conquest, the status of the building was changed from church to mosque and from mosque to church. However, in the inscription of the mosque, it reads that it was rebuilt in 1275 soon after Baibars had converted it to a mosque. Wendy Mayer and Pauline Allen suggest that the mosque is built on top of the former church of Cassian, however this remains uncertain as Yaqut al-Rumi mentions a shrine of Habib as a place of pilgrimage at the beginning of the thirteenth century when Antioch was under Frankish rule which was not that same church.

The mosque was demolished during the 1853 earthquake. It was rebuilt by the Ottomans but the older minaret was left standing. The shadirvan (ablution fountain) is a later addition.

The mosque was severely damaged in the 2023 earthquake, and was fully restored by 2026.

== Namesake ==
The mosque was named after Habib the Carpenter, or Habib al-Najjar, who lived in the time of Jesus Christ. In the early years of Christianity, he was martyred by the pagans, who refused to convert. He was canonized a Christian saint.

Muslims believe he was martyred for calling people to the religion of Allah. He is referred to in the Quran, chapter Ya-Sin, verses 20–27, as the supporter of the disciples calling the people of Ya-Sin to the worship of the One God: "Then there came running, from the farthest part of the City, a man, saying, 'O my people! Obey the messengers. Obey those who ask no reward of you (for themselves), and who have received Guidance.'"^{[Quran 36:20-21]}

== Two sarcophagi ==
The two sarcophagi found in the yard of the mosque are believed to belong to Jonah and John the Baptist, or the tomb of Habib along with that of Sham'un Al-Safa (Saint Peter, also known as Simon the Pure).
