= Disciples of Jesus in Islam =

The Quranic account of the disciples (Arabic: الحواريون al-ḥawāriyyūn) of Jesus does not include their names, numbers, or any detailed accounts of their lives. Muslim exegesis, however, more-or-less agrees with the New Testament list and says that the disciples included Peter, Philip, Thomas, Bartholomew, Matthew, Andrew, James, Jude, John and Simon the Zealot. Scholars generally draw a parallel with the disciples of Jesus and the companions of Muhammad, who followed Muhammad during his lifetime, 600 years later.

== Textual references ==
=== In the Qur'an ===
The following is a list of all the Qur'anic references to the disciples of Jesus:

But when Jesus felt [persistence in] disbelief from them, he said, "Who are my supporters for [the cause of] Allah?" The disciples said, "We are supporters for Allah. We have believed in Allah and testify that we are Muslims [submitting to Him]. (52) Our Lord, we have believed in what You revealed and have followed the messenger [i.e., Jesus], so register us among the witnesses [to truth]."(53)

— Qur'an 3:52-53

And [remember] when I inspired to the disciples, "Believe in Me and in My messenger [i.e., Jesus]." They said, "We have believed, so bear witness that indeed we are Muslims [in submission to Allah]."(111) [And remember] when the disciples said, "O Jesus, Son of Mary, can your Lord send down to us a table [spread with food] from the heaven?" [Jesus] said, "Fear Allah, if you should be believers."(112) They said, "We wish to eat from it and let our hearts be reassured and know that you have been truthful to us and be among its witnesses."(113) Said Jesus, the son of Mary, "O Allah, our Lord, send down to us a table [spread with food] from the heaven to be for us a festival for the first of us and the last of us and a sign from You. And provide for us, and You are the best of providers."(114) Allah said, "Indeed, I will send it down to you, but whoever disbelieves afterwards from among you - then indeed will I punish him with a punishment by which I have not punished anyone among the worlds."(115)

— Quran 5:111-115

O you who have believed, be supporters of Allah, as when Jesus, the son of Mary, said to the disciples, "Who are my supporters for Allah?" The disciples said, "We are supporters of Allah." And a faction of the Children of Israel believed and a faction disbelieved. So We supported those who believed against their enemy, and they became dominant. (14)

— Quran 61:14

=== In Hadith ===
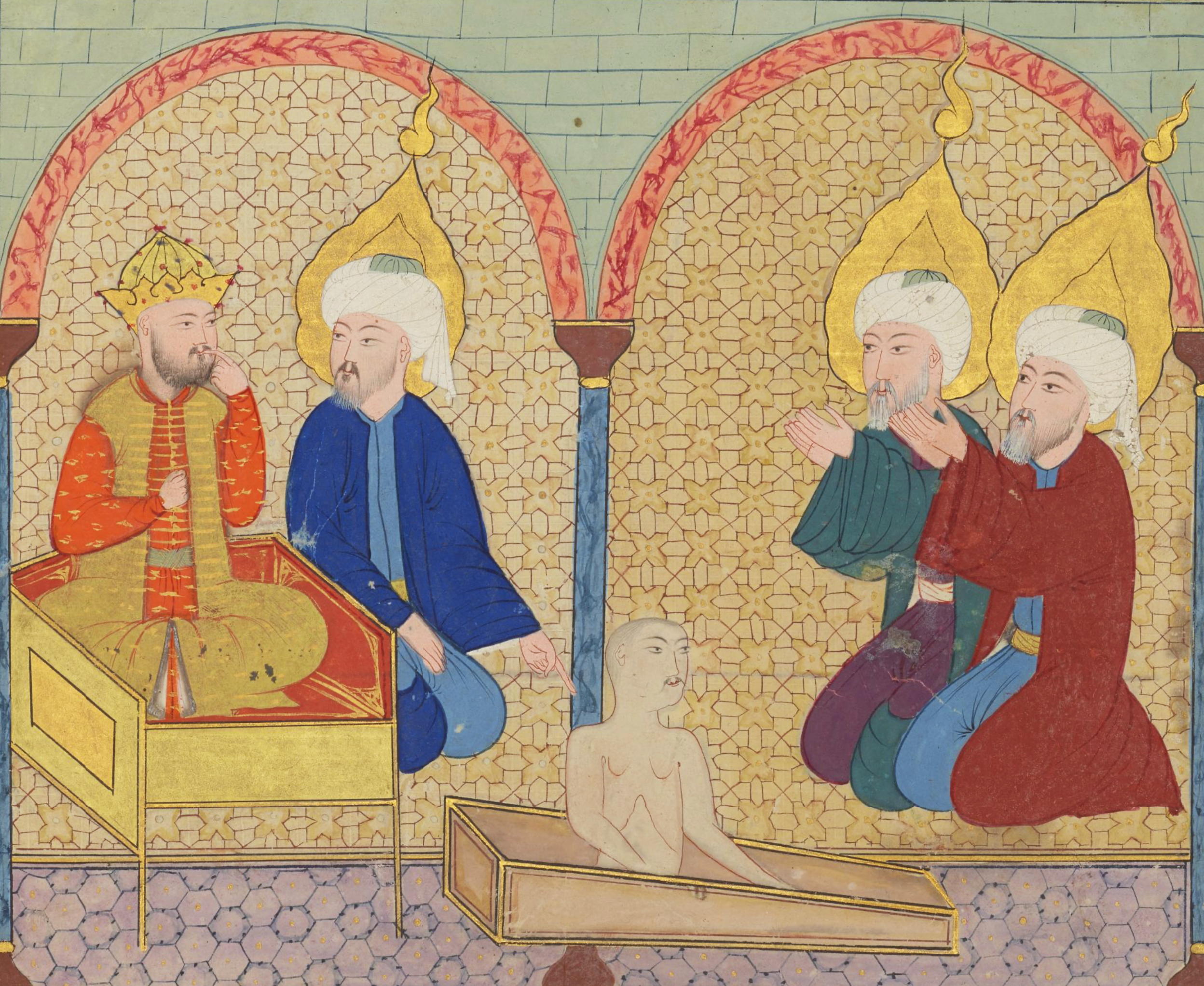
Illustration of a 1585-1590 Ottoman manuscript depicting three Islamic prophets and disciples of Isa visiting the ruler of the people of Ya-Sin. Two of them Sadiq and Saduq (the Truthful [John] and the Righteous [Paul]) raise a dead man to convince him of the Gospel. Next to the king sits Shalum (Simon-Peter).

The following are Hadith (narrations originating from the words of Muhammad), collected by Muslim ibn al-Hajjaj Nishapuri, which indirectly emphasize Islamic beliefs concerning the disciples of Jesus:

It is narrated on the authority 'Abdullah b. Mas'ud that the Messenger of God observed: Never a Prophet had been sent before me by God towards his nation who had not among his people (his) disciples and companions who followed his ways and obeyed his command. Then there came after them their successors who said whatever they did not practise, and practised whatever they were not commanded to do. He who strove against them with his hand was a believer: he who strove against them with his tongue was a believer, and he who strove against them with his heart was a believer and beyond that there is no faith even to the extent of a mustard seed. Abu Rafi' said: I narrated this hadith to 'Abdullah b. 'Umar; he contradicted me. There happened to come 'Abdullah b. Mas'ud who stayed at Qanat, and 'Abdullah b 'Umar wanted me to accompany him for visiting him (as 'Abdullah b. Mas'ud was ailing), so I went along with him and as we sat (before him) I asked Ibn Mas'ud about this hadith. He narrated it in the same way as I narrated it to Ibn 'Umar. The same hadith has been transmitted by another chain of narrators on the authority of 'Abdullah b. Mas'ud who observed: Never was there one among the prophets who had had not disciples who followed his direction and followed his ways. The remaining part of the hadith is like that as narrated by Salih but the arrival of Ibn Mas'ud and the meeting of Ibn 'Umar with him is not mentioned.

— Sahih Muslim

== See also ==
- Sahaba
- Habib the Carpenter
- People of Ya-Sin
