= Peter in Islam =

Apostle of Jesus Christ

In Islam, Simon Peter, known in Arabic as Shamoun as-Safa (Arabic: شَمْعُون ٱلصَّفَا, Šamʿūn aṣ-Ṣafā) or Shamoun ibn Hammoun (شَمْعُون ٱبْن حَمُّون, Šamʿūn ibn Ḥammūn), was one of the original disciples of Jesus. Although Jesus's disciples do not have a major role in Islamic theology, they are notably the only group of a previous prophet’s disciples specifically identified in the Qur’an. Peter is especially important as he is generally regarded to have led the faithful after Jesus’ Ascension, a view similar to the Christian (specifically Catholic) view of Peter as the “Prince of the Apostles” and first Pope.

The Qur'an is clear that the disciples of Jesus were steadfast believers in Allah. Scripture records that when Jesus began to feel the rejection of the Israelites, he asked the people who among them will support his preaching the Gospel. It was then that the disciples stood up and asked Jesus to bear witness they had submitted to God, and further promised to stay by Jesus during his whole life. The Qur'an further records God inspired the disciples to believe in His message and messenger, and how a feast from Heaven was the sign for the disciples. Although the Qur’an neither identifies nor numbers the disciples, Qur'anic exegesis names them, with Peter usually listed first for his role as their head.

Numerous incidents involving Peter are narrated in Muslim tradition and tafsir. The most famous of is the narrative of Peter's preaching in Antioch, which is closely linked with the legend of Habib the Carpenter. Islamic tradition narrates that two of Jesus's disciples, John and Jude, went to preach the Gospel in Antioch, as its people were devoted to idols. Few people followed their message, despite the two having performed miracles including healing the sick and blind. The disciples healed Habib's son, and Habib helped preach the Gospel to the people. When the news of the disciples reached the governor of the city, he called to see John and Jude, whom he disagreed with and imprisoned. While the two were in prison, Peter went to Antioch, and was allowed to perform a miracle before the governor, specifically raising a child who had been dead for seven days. The people refused to believe Peter's words, and angry with Habib for his faith, they stoned him to death. Non-Muslim sources maintain Peter later went to Rome to preach the Gospel.

Peter is also considered important in Isma'ilism, as his role is seen as analogous to that of 'Ali as the first Imām after a Prophet. Shi'i Muslims maintain that every major Prophet had one Disciple as his Waṣî (وصي, Executor-of-Will), who became the Imām (Leader) after his death: Adam had his son, Seth; Noah had Shem; Abraham had his sons; Moses had Joshua; and Ismailis claim Jesus had Peter.

== Believed descendants ==
Peter was clearly married, as evidenced by the Gospel accounts of Jesus curing his mother-in-law (Matthew 8:14, Luke 4:38).

According to Clement of Alexandria, an early Christian theologian, Peter also had children, but specific details about them are scarce. As any names or number are not in the Bible or contemporary historical records, direct genealogical links to Peter have become obscured or lost over the millennia.

== See also ==
- People of Ya-Sin
