= Kerateion =

Kerateion (Greek: Κερατεῖον) was the Jewish quarter in the Seleucid capital (and later Roman capital) of Antioch on the Orontes. The suburb was located in the southern portion of the ancient city, situated between the Forum Colonnades of Herod and Mt. Tauris, a rocky crag at the foot of Mount Silpios. The city of Antioch was erected around 300 BC by Seleucus I Nicator. After defeating the General Antigones and taking the city also called Antigones, Seleucus built a new city and named it after his Father Antiochos, a General who served under Alexander. Seleucus then populated the city with Macedonians, Inhabitants of the recently conquered city, Antigones, and Jews. The Jewish population had a special, independent relationship with Seleucid dynasty and even had bronze plaques erected to codify their autonomous standing.

According to Glanville Downey, Kerateion was situated in the southern end of the city between the Cherubim Gate from the first century and the newer Daphne Gate on the bank of the torrent called Phyrminus (across from the present barracks). If this is correct the situation will be close to the present synagogue in the opposite direction of Mount Staurin where St. Peter's Grotto is located.
