= Habib the Carpenter =

Muslim martyr who lived in Antioch at the time of Jesus

Saint Habib the Carpenter
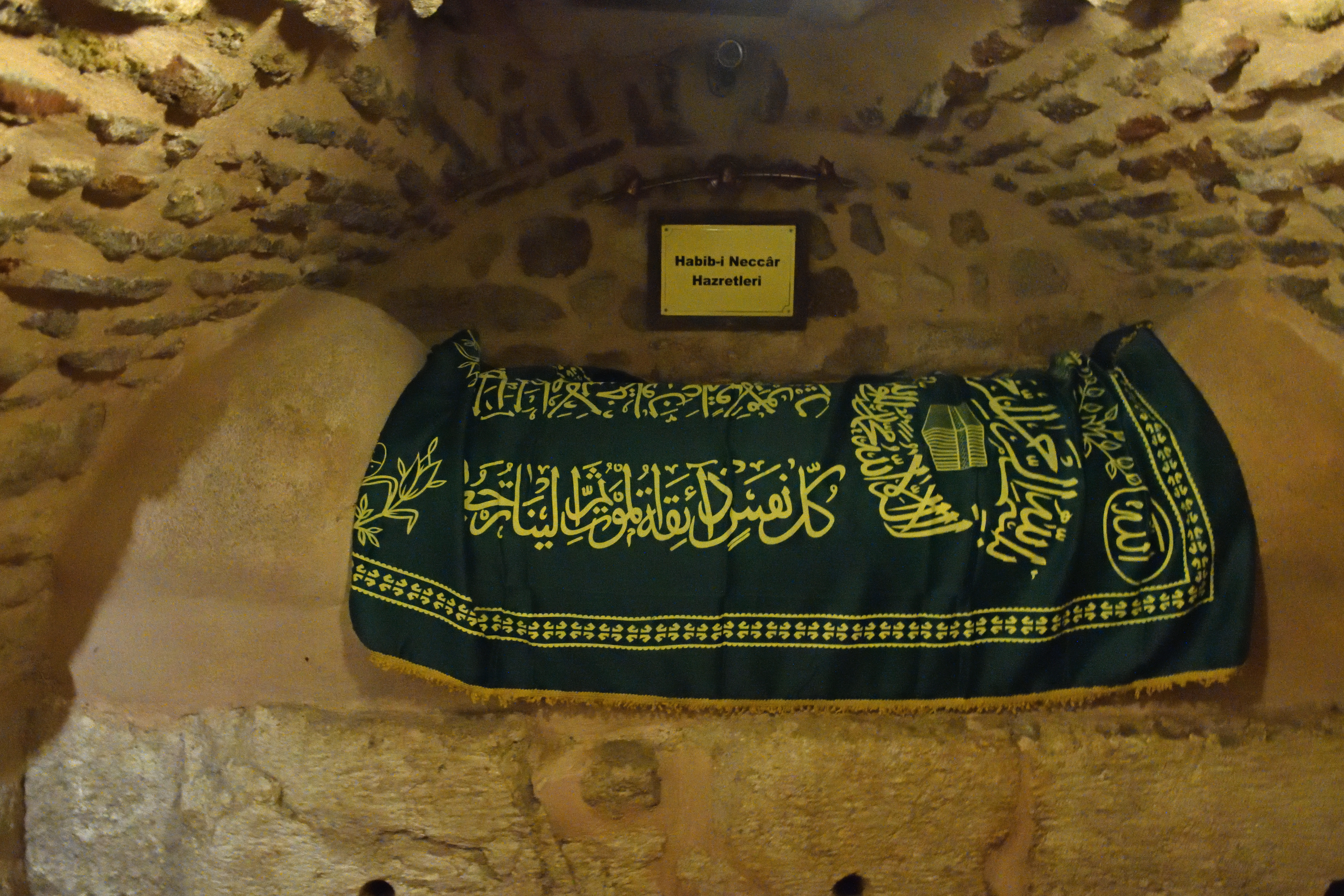
- Habib's tomb in modern-day Antakya

Martyr
- Born: c. 5 AD; Antioch, Roman Empire
- Died: c. 35 AD (aged c. 30); Antioch, Roman Empire
- Venerated in: Islam
- Major shrine: Mosque and Tomb of Habib Al-Najjar, Antioch
- Influences: Jesus

Habib the Carpenter, or Habib Al-Nadjar, حبيب النجـّار (c. 5 AD - c. 35 AD), was a martyr who lived in Antioch at the time of Jesus Christ. In Muslim tradition, Habib believed the message of Christ's disciples sent to the People of Ya-Sin, and was subsequently martyred for his faith. The Mosque of Habib-i Neccar (Ottoman for Habib al-Najjar), below Mount Silpium, contains the tomb of Habib along with that of Sham'un Al-Safa (Peter, also known as Simon the Pure). Some sources have identified Habib with Saint Agabus of the Acts of the Apostles, an early Christian who suffered martyrdom in Antioch at the time of Jesus. This connection is disputed, as Christian tradition holds that Agabus was martyred at Jerusalem, and not at Antioch as Muslims believe of Habib. All Muslim sources list Habib's occupation as a carpenter.

== Historical narrative ==
Although Habib is not mentioned in the Qur'an, an old Muslim tradition speaks of some of Christ's disciples, including John, Jude, and Peter, who were sent to town of Antioch to preach the faith of God. The people of Antioch were practicing idolatry; when the disciples came, many of the people questioned them, asking them of what religion Jesus had sent them to preach. Baidawi provided a detailed account of Habib's narrative. He related that the disciples met Habib in Antioch and made known to him their mission. Baidawi further related that the disciples, by the will of God, performed various miracles including healing the sick and blind. After Habib's son was healed, Habib's faith was further strengthened and he tried to help in preaching the Gospel to his fellow people. Yet still, many refused to hear God's message. Instead, the disbelievers decided to stone Habib to death. The legend ends with Habib, upon having been stoned, entering paradise as a martyr.

== In the Quran ==
The legend of Habib the martyr was, by early Quran commentators, identified with the following verse of the Quran:

And there came from the uttermost part of the city a man running. He cried: O my people! Follow those who have been sent!
"Obey those who ask no reward of you (for themselves), and who have themselves received guidance.
"It would not be reasonable in me if I did not serve Him Who created me, and to Whom ye shall (all) be brought back.
"Shall I take (other) gods besides Him? If (God) Most Gracious should intend some adversity for me, of no use whatever will be their intercession for me, nor can they deliver me.
"I would indeed, if I were to do so, be in manifest error.
"For me, I have faith in the Lord of you (all): listen, then, to me!"
It was said: "Enter thou the Garden." He said: "Ah me! Would that my people knew (what I know)!-
"For that my Lord has granted me forgiveness and has enrolled me among those held in honour!"

— Qur'an, sura 36 (Ya-Seen), ayah 20-27

The people who are described as preaching to the town in the Qur'anic verse are mentioned as Rasūl. Some modern commentators believe the identification of Christ's disciples and Habib with the figures in the Qur'anic verse is false because they say the term Rasul denotes a Prophet in the Qur'an, unlike the New Testament which describes some disciples of Jesus as apostles. Many people translate Rasulullah as 'Apostle of God'. Some sources have identified Habib with the Prophet Agabus of Acts of the Apostles. The Qur'an also uses the words 'nabiyya' to refer to prophets and the word 'naziraa' to refer to prophets who are 'warners.' Therefore, the argument of modern commentators that Habib cannot be a 'rasul' as mentioned in the Qur'an is contradicted by the language of Qur'an itself, which indicates broader understanding of the word 'rasul' and also uses others words to refer to prophets.

== See also ==
- Islamic view of Jesus
- Disciples of Jesus in Islam
