= Library of Antioch =

Building in ancient Antioch, part of the Seleucid Empire

The Royal Library of Antioch was commissioned by Antiochus III (or Antiochus the Great) of the Seleucid Empire (a successor state of Alexander the Great's empire) around 221 B.C. in Antioch (now Antakya) and opened to scholars. Euphorion of Chalcis, an intellectually influential ancient poet from Greece, accepted the challenge issued by the king and established the royal library at Antioch. He also served as principal librarian until his death.

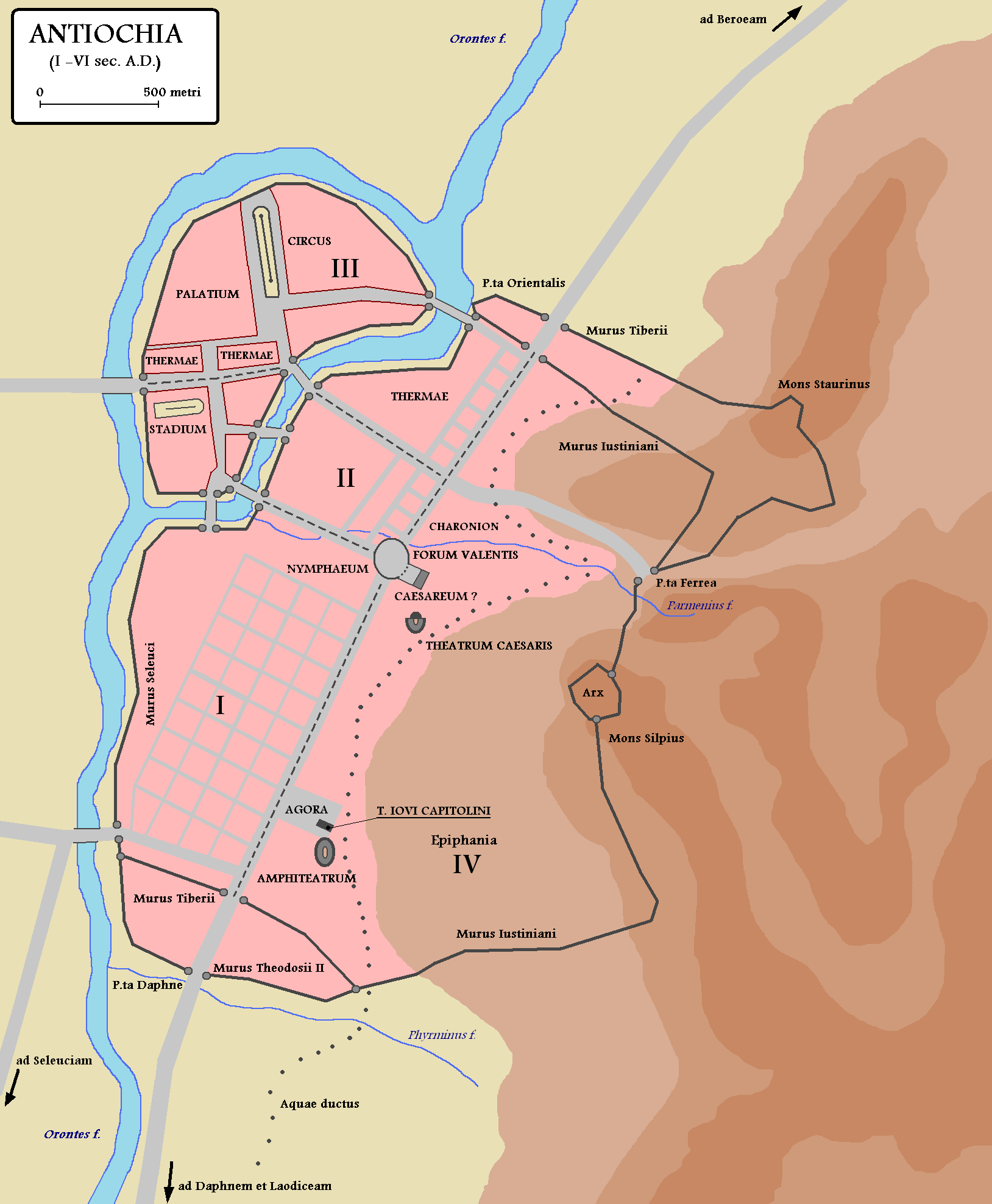
Map of Antioch, 1st-4th centuries CE

== Destruction ==
Sometimes confused with the Library of Antioch, a statement in the works of John of Antioch (7th century) is the earliest to describe the destruction of a separate building, a temple from the period of Hadrian turned into a library by Julian the Apostate, by the emperor Jovian. The primary intentions in the event may have been religious, although some historians attribute them rather to social, economic, and ethnic differences. Other historians have entirely cast doubt onto whether this event really occurred.

== The Museion ==
There is also a possibility that another structure was also considered a part of the Royal Library, but this is uncertain according to scholars. At some time between 114 B.C and 92 B.C. during the reign of either Antiochus IX (114–95 B.C.) or Antiochus X (95–92 B.C.), Antioch also acquired the means for a Museum with a library to be built with the monies bequeathed to the city in the will of Maron, a merchant of Antioch who had relocated to Athens, but like many merchants of the day who moved left a portion of his estate to his native city.

This Museion was similar to its rival Alexandria, though that of Alexandria seems to have come first. The most famous part of the Alexandria complex was the famed Library. Antioch's also contained a substantial library component.

These complexes originated as shrines to the Muses but in time evolved into the first universities. Alexandria's enjoyed a long and illustrious reputation, producing well-known artists and intellectuals over the centuries, whereas Antioch's was more modest and obscure in its output.

The Museion in Antioch was reportedly on the lower slopes of Mt Silpius near to the "old" city but on the higher side of the colonnaded street. A report in Stinespring of the Vatican Codex may refer to this establishment:

"And they constructed buildings of learning. Among these is a circular structure, in the middle of which is a dome 100 cubits high; and in this is a reproduction of the heavens, including stars, signs of the zodiac and horoscopes, with movements which have been worked out by the savants and completed by the Brahmins, who in the science of the heavens, have reached the highest rank. So nothing moves in the real heavens, without having its likeness reproduced: sun, moon and everything which is in the heavens."

According to Lassus, the Museion was near the agora of Epiphania, was founded under Antiochus Philpator, burnt under Tiberius, reconstructed by Marcus Aurelius and then under Probus, embellished under the Empress Eudoxia in 438 AD. Constantine converted it to use as the prefectory of the comes Orientis (the Count of the East, the principal Byzantine official in the Eastern part of the Empire) but it was burnt down in a riot of the Green faction on the 9th of July 507.
