= List of people known as the Carpenter =

"The Carpenter" is an epithet of:

- Habib the Carpenter (c. 5 AD–c. 35 AD), in Muslim tradition a martyr
- William the Carpenter (fl. 1087–1102), French viscount (of Melun)
