= Silphium (disambiguation) =

Silphium is an unidentified plant recorded in classical antiquity, believed extinct.

Silphium or Silphion can also refer to:

- Silphium (genus) of North American daisies in the family Asteraceae known as "rosinweeds"
- Silphion (insect), an extinct protorthopteran insect genus in the family Anthracothremmidae

== See also ==
- Silpium, a mountain in Greek mythology
