= Euphorion of Chalcis =

Classical Greek poet

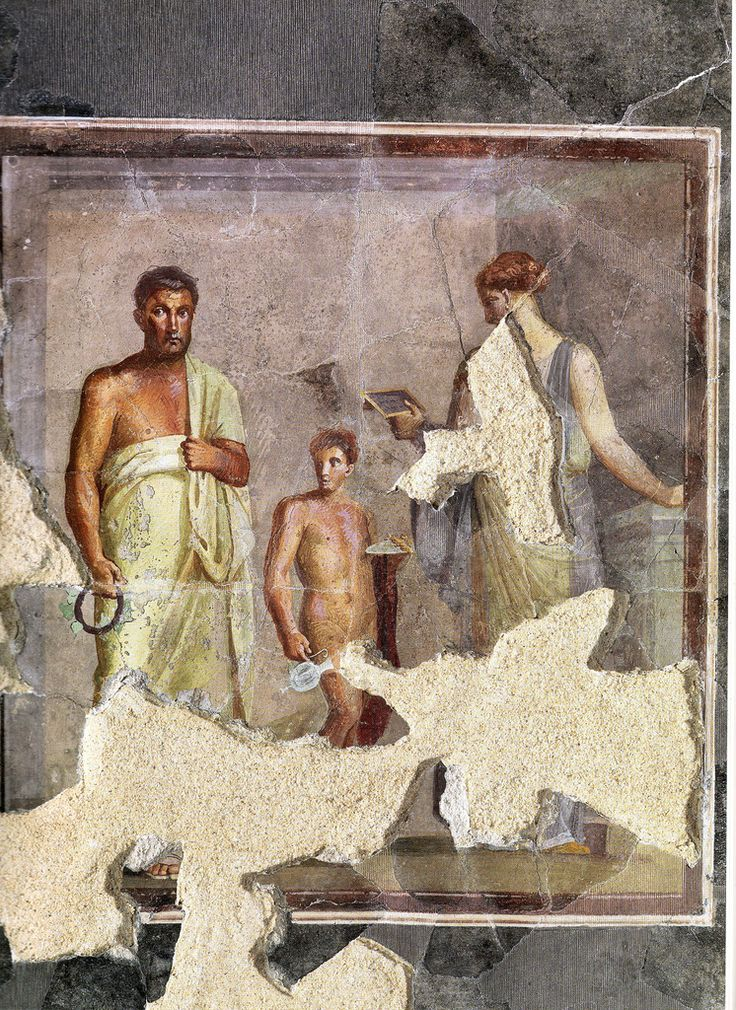
Antique fresco in Pompeii probably depicting Euphorion

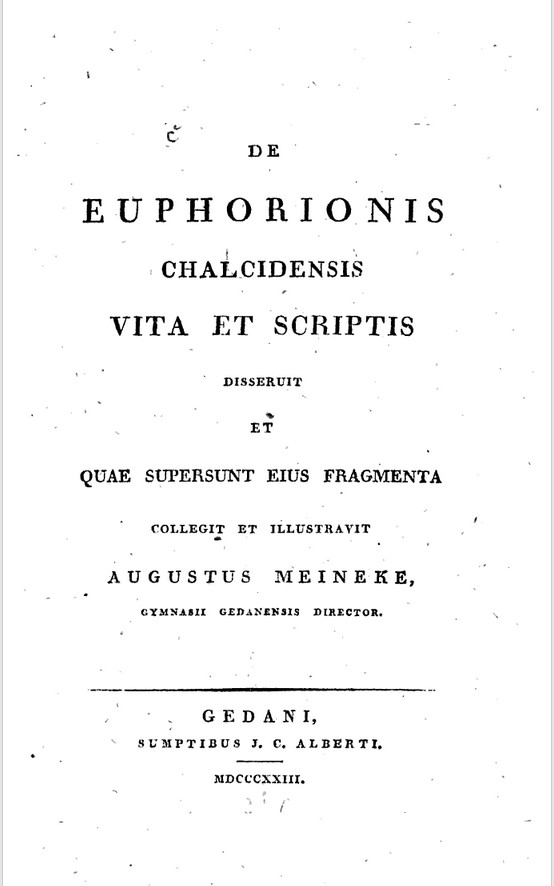
Front cover of Euphorion's biography, written by August Meineke in Latin under the title De Euphorionis Chalcidensis vita et scriptis (The life and works of Euphorion of Chalcis), 1823

Euphorion of Chalcis (Greek: Εὐφορίων ὁ Χαλκιδεύς) was a Greek poet and grammarian, born at Chalcis in Euboea in the 126th olympiad (276–272 BC).

Euphorion spent much of his life in Athens, where he amassed great wealth. After studying philosophy with Lacydes and Prytanis, he became the student and eromenos of the poet Archeboulus. About 221 he was invited by Antiochus the Great to the court of Syria. He assisted in the formation of the royal Library of Antioch, of which he held the post of librarian till his death. He wrote mythological epics (the Thrax), amatory elegies, epigrams and a satirical poem (Arae, "curses") after the manner of the Ibis of Callimachus.

Prose works on antiquities and history are also attributed to him. Like Lycophron, he was fond of using archaic and obsolete expressions, and the erudite character of his allusions rendered his language very obscure. His elegies were highly esteemed by the Romans—they were imitated or translated by Cornelius Gallus and also by the emperor Tiberius.

Fragments published in Meineke, De Euphorionis Chalcidensis vita et scriptis, in his Analecta Alexandrina (1843) began the modern editions of the surviving fragments of Euphorion. Further lines have been recovered from papyri of Oxyrhynchus and elsewhere. Scholar A. S. Hollis argued Euphorion influenced the work of later Greek poet Nonnus through similarities in writing and style.

== Works ==
=== The Thrax ===
This piece of writing was a curse poem, where Euphorion wishes an extremely ill fate upon his enemy due to them seemingly murdering someone close to him. This could possibly be a dog or other pet. Euphorion mentions mythological figures (i.e. some close to Heracles), which is common in curse poems to wish the recipient a fate worse than theirs.

=== Epigrams ===
Much of Euphorion's surviving works consist of epigrams. One is about a man named Exodus showing off to another named Phoebus. Another is about a man who lost a friend at sea, but still set up a grave and tomb in his honor.

=== Perfect Numbers ===
Euphorion also wrote about perfect numbers in his own way. A fragment of this has been saved and he compares varying number types to mythological creatures (i.e. Cyclopes).

== Other people named Euphorion ==
- Euphorion (mythology) was the son of Achilles and Helen.
- Euphorion (playwright) was a 5th century BCE writer of tragedies.
