= Antioch chalice =

Silver-gilt metalwork in the Metropolitan Museum of Art, NYC

The Antioch "Chalice"
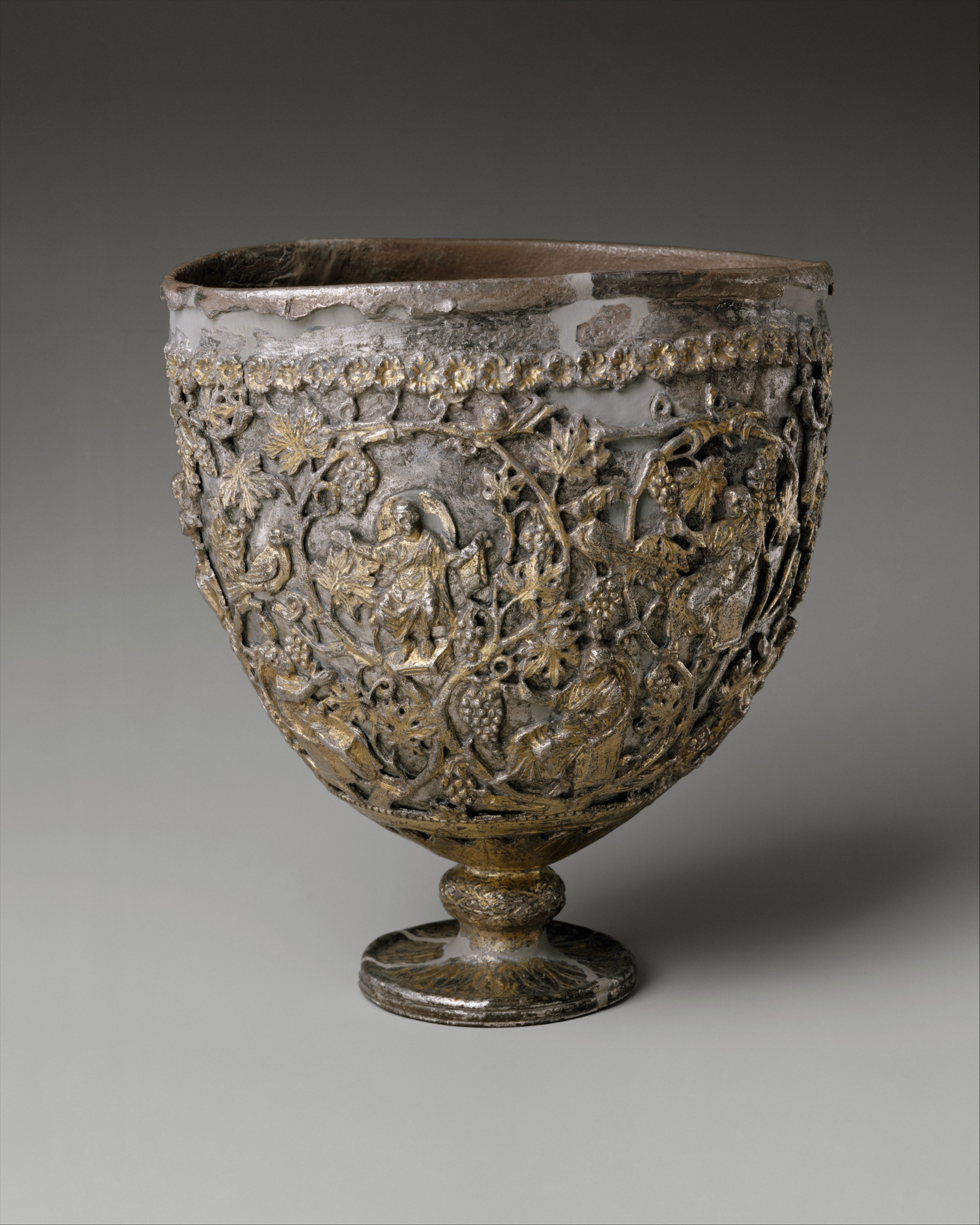
- Type: Vessel (chalice or a standing oil lamp)
- Material: Silver, silver-gilt
- Length: 15.2 cm (6.0 in)
- Height: 19.6 cm (7.7 in)
- Width: 18 cm (7.1 in)
- Created: 500–550 AD
- Discovered: Kaper Koraon (near Antioch)
- Present location: The Metropolitan Museum of Art, The Cloisters, New York
- Identification: 50.4
- Culture: Byzantine

The Antioch chalice is a silver-gilt Christian vessel, perhaps a eucharistic chalice, made around AD 500–550. Currently it is on view at The Metropolitan Museum of Art Fifth Avenue in Gallery 300. When it was discovered, the interior cup of the chalice was initially considered by some to be the Holy Chalice, the cup used by Christ at the Last Supper. Recently, it has been concluded that it may have been a standing oil lamp and not a chalice.

== Description ==
The Antioch chalice is a silver cup that is encased within an elaborate open-work gilded silver footed shell. It measures 19.6 x 18 x 15.2 cm with a 7.4 cm base. The body of the cup, originally ovoid, has been bent out of shape. When it was discovered, the chalice was covered in a heavy oxidation, which was cleaned off during the restoration process. Internal corrosion has rendered the interior cup extremely brittle. On the base of the chalice there are lotus petals, with a palm wreath above it on the bulb of the short stem. Surrounding the rim of the shell is a row of rosettes and one star. The bottom of the outer shell has an open lotus flower, and the upper areas of the outer shell contain a fruited grapevine wrought into twelve loops, each of the loops containing a figure.

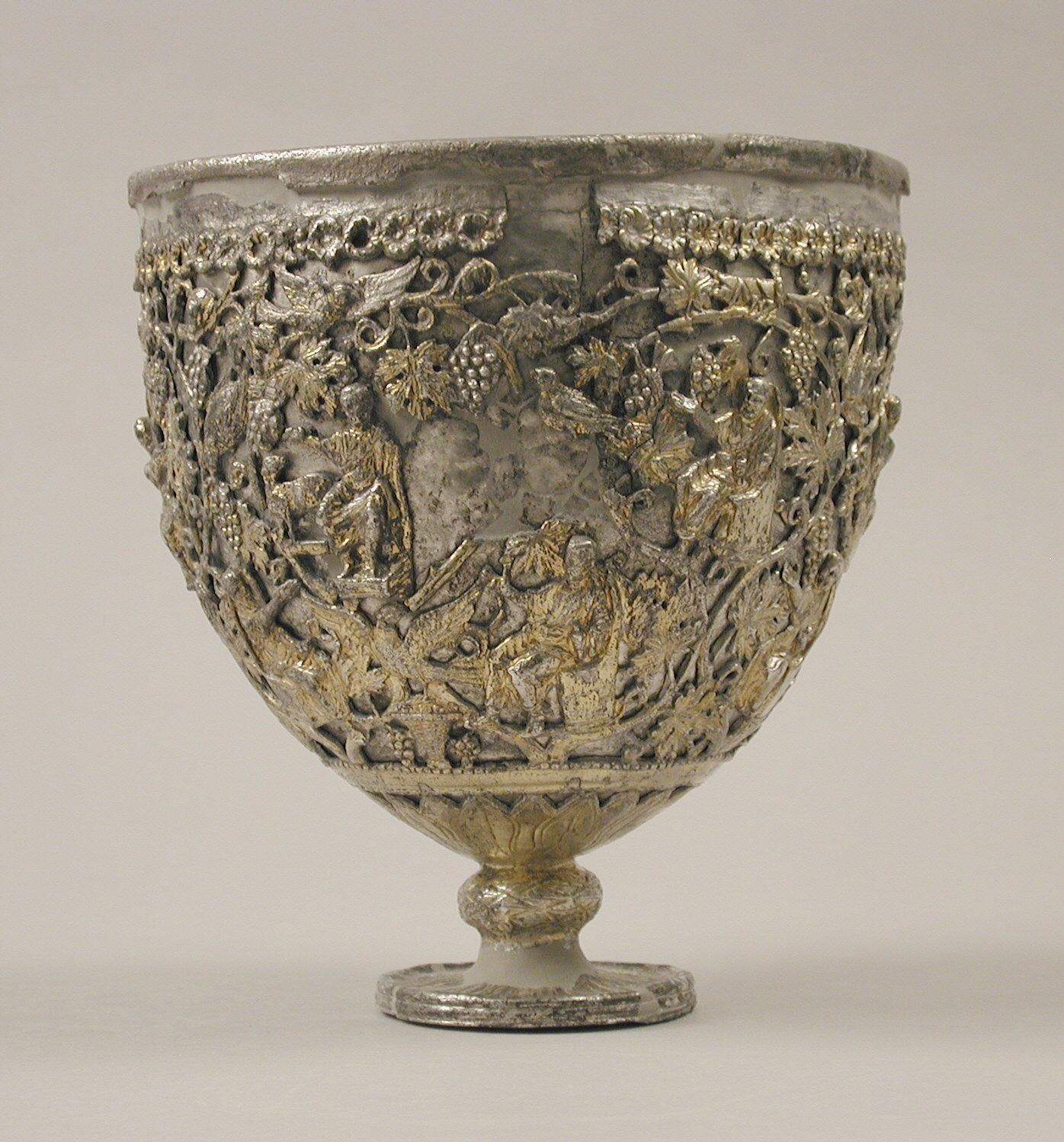
Another view

Two of the figures portrayed in the loops are images of Christ, one showing Christ holding a scroll and the other showing Christ sitting beside a lamb, above a spread-winged eagle perched on a basket of fruit. The other ten figures were initially thought to be ten of the apostles but they have been variably identified as classical age philosophers, who had foretold the coming of Christ. On the outer shell there are also snails, doves, a butterfly, a grasshopper, and a rabbit.

== History ==
The Antioch chalice was found in Antioch on the Orontes (in modern Turkey, just near the Syrian border) in 1910 along with several other items, including a large cross and three book covers. It was believed to have belonged to a church in Antioch, one of the five cities that led the early Christian church along with Rome, Constantinople, Jerusalem, and Alexandria. When it was discovered, the inner cup was thought to be the Holy Chalice, with the gilded, footed shell being added within the first century after the death of Christ to honor the grail. It was displayed as the Holy Grail at the Chicago World's Fair in 1933 and was later sold to The Cloisters in New York in 1950.

== Recent events ==
Recently the Antioch chalice has been identified as having the shape of a standing lamp commonly used in churches in the first half of the sixth century. Potentially, it is decorated in recognition of Christ's words "I am the light of the world". It has also been determined recently that the Antioch chalice could have been a part of a larger group of silver objects that belonged to the Church of Saint Sergios in the small town of Kaper Koraon.
