= Archebulus =

Ancient Greek poet

Archebulus or Archeboulus (Ancient Greek: Ἀρχέβουλος) of Thera (or possibly Thebes, Greece) was a lyric poet who appears to have lived around the year 280 BCE, as Euphorion of Chalcis is said to have been instructed by him in poetry. A particular kind of verse which was frequently used by other lyric poets was named after him. This was called archebuleum, which was made up of four anapaests and one bacchaeus. This metre was also frequently used by Callimachus, and because of this it was sometimes named after him as well. No fragments of his poetry are extant.
