= Xenarius =

Ancient Greek architect

Xenarius was a Greek architect and urban planner during the 3rd century BC. He is known for his plan for the city of Antioch. The grid layout of the city is believed to be influenced by Dinocrates' plan of Alexandria.

John Malalas, in his work, writes that the architect of the walls of Antioch was called Xenaeus (Ξεναῖος).
