= Antioch =

Hellenistic city, modern Antakya, Turkey

Antioch on the Orontes
- Ἀντιόχεια ἡ ἐπὶ Ὀρόντου (Ancient Greek); Antiochia ad Orontem (Latin)
- Map of Antioch in Ancient and early Medieval times under Roman rule

- Location within Turkey
- 36°12′17″N 36°10′54″E
- Type: Settlement
- Periods: Hellenistic to medieval
- Cultures: Greek, Hellenistic, Roman, Armenian, Syriac, Arab, Byzantine, Outremer, Turkish
- Location: Antakya, Hatay Province, Turkey

History
- Built: 300 BC
- Built by: Seleucus I Nicator
- Abandoned: Insignificant by the end of the 15th century
- Event(s): Roman–Persian Wars, First Crusade

Site notes
- Area: 15 km^{2} (5 3/4 sq mi)
- Excavation dates: 1932–1939
- Condition: Mostly buried

Antioch (Note: /ˈænti.ɒk/; often referred to as Antioch near Daphne (Ancient Greek: Ἀντιόχεια ἡ ἐπὶ Δάφνῃ) or Antioch on the Orontes (Ancient Greek: Ἀντιόχεια ἡ ἐπὶ Ὀρόντου; Antiochia ad Orontem).) was a city located in northern Syria at the site of modern Antakya, Turkey. Founded in 300 BC, Antioch became one of the most important cities of the ancient eastern Mediterranean. The capital of the Hellenistic Seleucid Empire, it remained significant under the Roman and Byzantine Empires, and during the Crusades was the centre of the Principality of Antioch.

Seleucus I Nicator, a successor of Alexander the Great, founded Antioch alongside three other cities to secure the surrounding region, which he had recently conquered. He chose a site on the Orontes River in the southwest Amuq plain, a fertile lowland which provided valuable resources for Antioch; the city was strategically located and came to dominate trade routes. It served as the Seleucid capital from 240 BC until 63 BC, when the Romans took control; it was thereafter the capital of Roman Syria. Antioch may have been inhabited by over 500,000 inhabitants at its peak, making the city the third largest in the Roman Empire after Rome and Alexandria.

The city was the main centre of Hellenistic Judaism at the end of the Second Temple period. As one of the cities of the pentarchy, Antioch was called "the cradle of Christianity" as a result of its longevity and the pivotal role that it played in the emergence of early Christianity. The Christian New Testament asserts that the name "Christian" first emerged in Antioch. From the early 4th century, Antioch was the seat of the comes Orientis, head of the Diocese of the East. The city declined to relative insignificance during the Middle Ages due to warfare, repeated earthquakes, and a change in trade routes. The remains of the ancient city of Antioch are mostly buried beneath alluvial deposits from the Orontes River.

The city still lends its name to the Greek Orthodox Patriarchate of Antioch, one of the most important modern churches of the Levant and the eastern Mediterranean. The city also attracts Muslim pilgrims who visit the Habib-i Nejjar Mosque, which they believe to contain the tomb of Habib the Carpenter, mentioned in surah Yā-Sīn of the Quran.

== Location and topography ==
The ruins of the ancient city of Antioch today lie underneath Antakya, located in Hatay Province in south Turkey. Like the modern city, Antioch was located in the southwest Amuq plain, a lowland plain watered by three rivers. The Kara Su and Afrin rivers flowed into the Lake of Antioch at the plain's centre, but the Orontes River, flowing northwards from Syria, skirted the plain's southern edge and, joined by the lake's outflow, cut westward through the mountains to reach the Mediterranean Sea. The plain was, and remains, extremely fertile: the cereal crops wheat and barley were farmed alongside olives, olive oil, and wine, while Antioch was renowned for the quality of its cucumbers, cabbages, and medicinal plants such as Oenanthe. Other resources, such as the valuable cypress wood and building stone, were also abundant, while the city's residents drew upon the seafood of the lake, the river, and the sea, in addition to their domesticated livestock. In antiquity, the wild animals of the region included Asiatic lions, Caspian tigers, ostriches, and fallow deer, alongside the scorpions and gnats still present today.

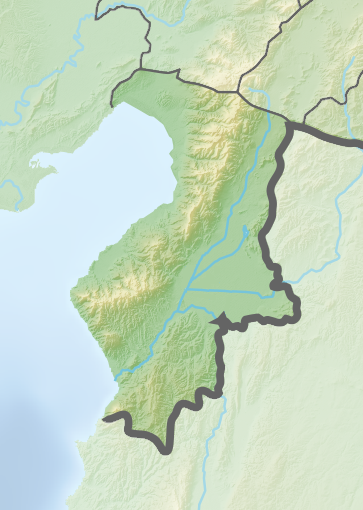
Historically significant locations in Hatay Province, Turkey

Antioch was built at an elevation of 90 metres (300 ft) above sea level between the slopes of the 560 metres (1,840 ft)-tall Mount Silpius to the southeast, and the left bank of the Orontes, which here flowed from northeast to southwest. Although an island in the river was also urbanised, Antioch was generally hemmed in by its local topography. The area's hydrography presented significant challenges, especially during the rainy season, when the Orontes and the streams descending from Mount Silpius regularly flooded the city and surrounding farmland. Attempts to control the water through a complex network of drains, conduits, aqueducts, and dams failed over centuries; the deposition of alluvial material became so great that the island in the river disappeared and the city itself was buried metres-deep. Antioch, straddling the northern Dead Sea Rift fault line near to the Marash Triple Junction, has also suffered more than sixty notable earthquakes, of which around ten had a magnitude greater than 7.

Antioch was connected to the Mediterranean Sea by the Orontes, which was likely navigable up to the city in antiquity; the city's rulers devoted great energy to keeping the river free for trade and transport. The walls, rebuilt at least eight times between the city's foundation and the Crusader era, originally enclosed an area of around 90 hectares (0.35 sq mi), which may have grown to 500 hectares (1.9 sq mi) by 540 AD. Roads radiated in all directions from the walls, including towards the renowned suburb of Daphne, located 8 kilometres (5.0 mi) south of the city at modern Harbiye. Regarded as inextricably linked to Antioch until it was abandoned in the late Middle Ages, Daphne contained numerous springs which provided a regular source of water for Antioch, especially during the dry summer months when no rain fell. One quirk of the city's local climate was an intense wind which continues to be funnelled up the Orontes valley between May and October.

== Early history ==
The Amuq plain, a key link in connecting Anatolia, Syria, the Mediterranean Sea, and the deserts of the Middle East, had been inhabited for thousands of years before the foundation of Antioch. Tell Kurdu, the earliest site yet excavated, was inhabited from the Halaf-Ubaid periods until well into the Chalcolithic. Later Bronze Age sites include the regional powerhouses of Tell Atchana and Tell Tayinat, which continued to be influential into the Iron Age, and smaller settlements such as Çatal Höyük (unrelated to the Anatolian site of the same name) and Tell Judaidah. Large palaces, fortifications, and other structures have been excavated at multiple sites, while ceramic evidence shows commercial links with the city-states of Archaic Greece, such as Corinth, Rhodes, and Athens, which grew as the Iron Age neared its close in the eighth and seventh centuries BC. The region of Syria, including the Amuq plain, was conquered by the Persian king Cyrus the Great in the mid-sixth century, and remained under the control of Cyrus's Achaemenid Empire until Alexander the Great invaded in 333 BC. By this time, most of the Metal Age tells had been abandoned and replaced with a intricate network of small farms and fields.

The fourth and sixth century writers Libanius and John Malalas connected the site of Antioch with Greek mythology and legends in order to glorify the city's origins. According to Libanius, three settlements preceded Antioch: Iopolis, founded by Argives under Triptolemus who were searching for their lost princess Io; Kasiotis, a joint settlement of Cretans and Cypriots; and Herakleia, established by the descendants of the hero Heracles. He also recorded that the Persian king Cambyses II gave his blessing to the Greek settlements in the area. Malalas provided different aetiological linkages, writing that the hero Perseus had visited Iopolis and that Herakleia was founded where the nymph Daphne was turned into a tree to escape the god Apollo. Libanius also held that Alexander, renowned for his city foundations, had intended to establish one at Antioch but, prevented by a lack of time, instead founded a shrine to Zeus and a small citadel named Emathia. There is no proof for any of these claims or connections.

=== Foundation and naming ===
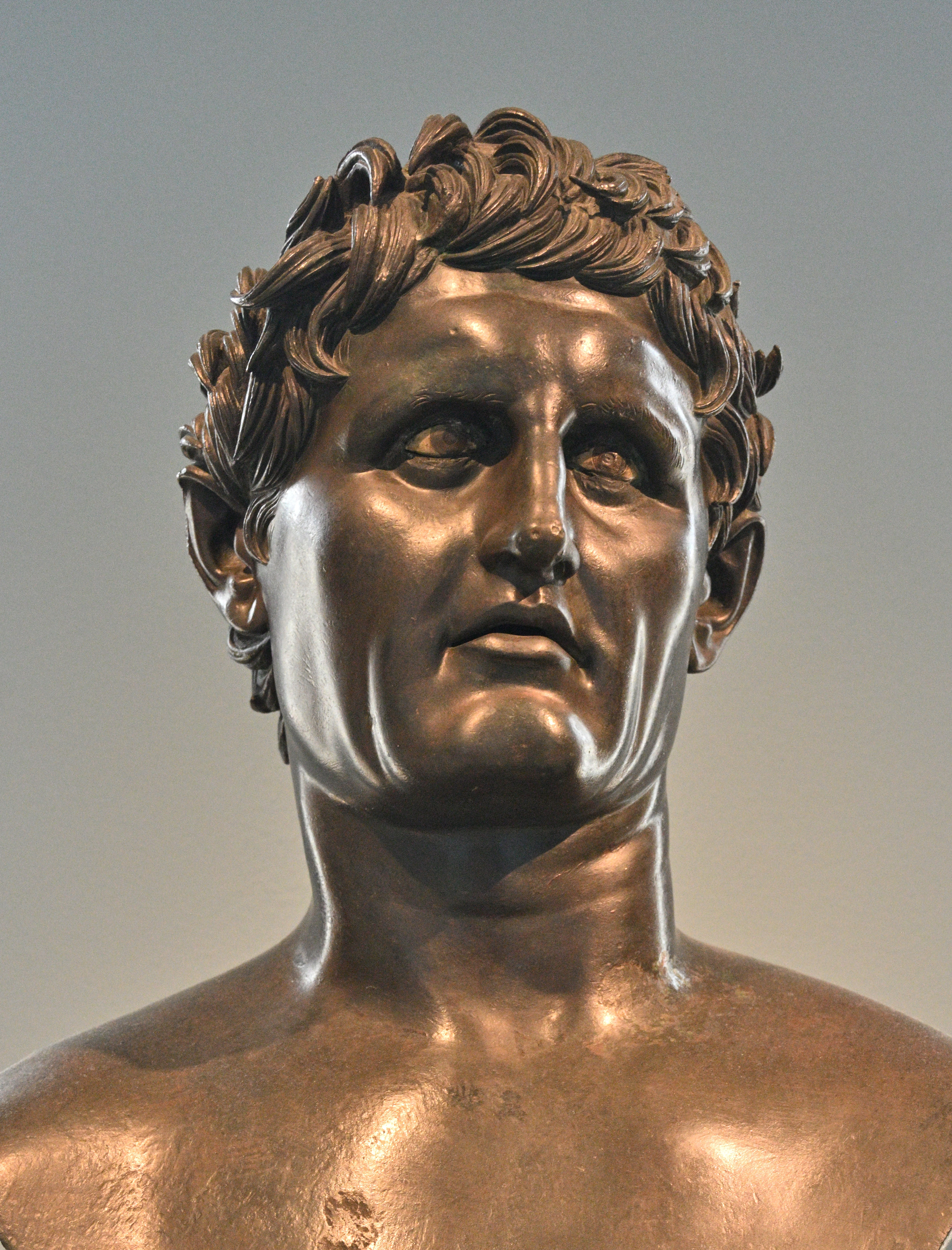
Bust of Seleucus I Nicator, founder of Antioch. Roman found in Herculaneum, now at the National Archaeological Museum, Naples.

The death of Alexander the Great in 323 BC precipitated the division of the territories he had conquered amongst his leading generals, termed Diadochi, such as Seleucus, who by 301 BC had established his power over the eastern provinces, up to Babylonia. In that year, his victory over Antigonus I Monophthalmus at the Battle of Ipsus gave him control of northern Syria, but many inhabitants of the region were still loyal to Antigonus's son Demetrius. Meanwhile, the Diadochi Pleistarchus and Lysimachus controlled territories to the north and west respectively, and Ptolemy I of Egypt had taken possession of southern Syria up to the Eleutheros river. To secure his hold on his newly-conquered territory, Seleucus ordered the foundation of four settlements between 301 and 299 BC: Seleucia Pieria and Laodicea on the coast, paired with Antioch and Apamea inland. The settlement was so intense that the area which connected the coast and the Euphrates came to be known as the Seleucis; Seleucia was originally designated as the capital of this Tetrapolis. (Note: Strabo 16.2.4., translated by H. L. Jones: "Seleucis is not only the best of the above-mentioned portions of Syria, but also is called, and is, a Tetrapolis, owing to the outstanding cities in it, for it has several. But the largest are four: Antiocheia near Daphnê, Seleucia Pieria, and also Apameia and Laodiceia; and these cities, all founded by Seleucus Nicator, used to be called sisters, because of their concord with one another.")

Seleucus was disinclined to simply occupy and rename Antigoneia, the nearby city founded by Antigonus several years previously, because usurping its prominence with a new foundation of his own would symbolise his power and prestige. This gave rise to one of Antioch's primary foundation myths, as retold by the later Antiochene chroniclers John Malalas and Libanius: after founding Seleucia Pieria on 23 April 300, Seleucus travelled to Antigoneia and there performed a sacrifice in honor of Zeus. An eagle is said to have carried off the sacrificial meat and, by dropping it at the future location of Antioch, indicated Zeus's favoured site. Malalas writes that Seleucus sacrificed to Zeus at sunrise on 22 May 300 at the site of Antioch, and immediately began construction of a temple to the god.

Ancient sources dispute whether Selecus named Antioch in honour of his father or his son, both named Antiochus. Modern scholarship have conclusively decided in favour of the former, for multiple reasons. Firstly, as the historian Glanville Downey notes: "If Seleucia Pieria was named for Seleucus, Apamea for his wife, and Laodicea for his mother, it seems logical to suppose that Antioch was named for Seleucus' father rather than for his son". Secondly, the tradition favouring the son only became prominent during the Byzantine period; the tradition favouring the father is much older, including the superior ancient sources Strabo and Appian.

== Hellenistic age ==
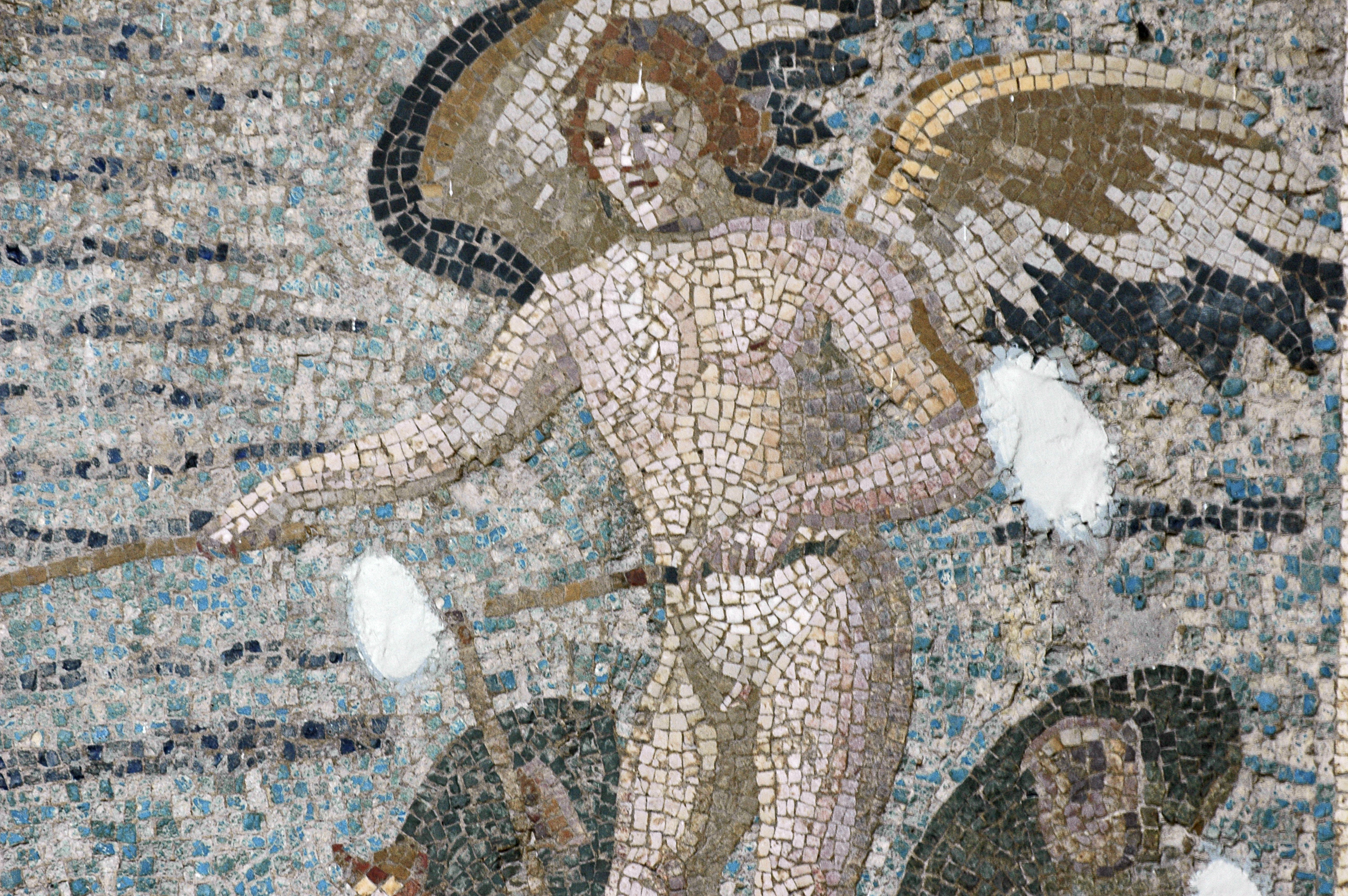
Mosaic of Eros standing on the wings of two Psyches and whipping them on in Hatay Archaeology Museum

The original city of Seleucus was laid out in imitation of the grid plan of Alexandria by the architect Xenarius. Libanius describes the first building and arrangement of this city (i. p. 300. 17). The citadel was on Mount Silpius, and the city lay mainly on the low ground to the north, fringing the river. Two great colonnaded streets intersected in the centre. A second walled area to the east was added by Antiochus I Soter. North of the city, Seleucus II Callinicus built a third walled area on an island within the Orontes. A fourth and last quarter was added by Antiochus IV Epiphanes; thenceforth Antioch was known as Tetrapolis. From west to east the whole was about 6 kilometres (4 miles) in diameter and a little less from north to south. This area included many large gardens.

The city was populated by a mix of local settlers that Athenians brought from nearby Antigoneia, Macedonians, and Jews (who were given full status from the beginning). According to ancient tradition, Antioch was settled by 5,500 Athenians and Macedonians, together with an unknown number of native Syrians. This number probably refers to free adult citizens, so that the total number of free Greek settlers including women and children was probably between 17,000 and 25,000.

About 6 kilometres (4 miles) west and beyond the suburb Heraclea lay the paradise of Daphne, a park of woods and waters, in the midst of which rose a great temple to the Pythian Apollo, also founded by Seleucus I and enriched with a cult-statue of the god, as Musagetes, by Bryaxis. A companion sanctuary of Hecate was constructed underground by Diocletian. The beauty and the lax morals of Daphne were celebrated all over the ancient world; and indeed Antioch as a whole shared in both these titles to fame.

Antioch became the capital and court-city of the western Seleucid Empire under Antiochus I, its counterpart in the east being Seleucia; but its paramount importance dates from the Battle of Ancyra (240 BC), which shifted the Seleucid centre of gravity from Anatolia and led indirectly to the rise of Pergamon.

The Seleucids reigned from Antioch. We know little of it in the Hellenistic period, apart from Syria, all our information coming from authors of the late Roman time. Among its great Greek buildings we hear only of the theatre, of which substructures still remain on the flank of Silpius, and of the royal palace, probably situated on the island. It enjoyed a reputation for being "a populous city, full of most erudite men and rich in the most liberal studies", but the only names of distinction in these pursuits during the Seleucid period that have come down to us are Apollophanes, the Stoic, and one Phoebus, a writer on dreams. The nicknames which they gave to their later kings were Aramaic; and, except Apollo and Daphne, the great divinities of north Syria seem to have remained essentially native, such as the "Persian Artemis" of Meroe and Atargatis of Hierapolis Bambyce.

The epithet "Golden" suggests that the external appearance of Antioch was impressive, but the city needed constant restoration owing to the seismic disturbances to which the district has always been subjected. The first great earthquake in recorded history was related by the native chronicler John Malalas. It occurred in 148 BC and did immense damage.

Local politics were turbulent. In the many dissensions of the Seleucid house the population took sides, and frequently rose in rebellion, for example against Alexander Balas in 147 BC, and Demetrius II Nicator in 129 BC. The latter, enlisting a body of Jews, punished his capital with fire and sword. In the last struggles of the Seleucid house, Antioch turned against its feeble rulers, invited Tigranes the Great to occupy the city in 83 BC, tried to unseat Antiochus XIII Asiaticus in 65 BC, and petitioned Rome against his restoration in the following year. Antioch's wish prevailed, and it passed with Syria to the Roman Republic in 64 BC, but remained a civitas libera.

== Roman period ==
=== Roman rule before Constantine ===
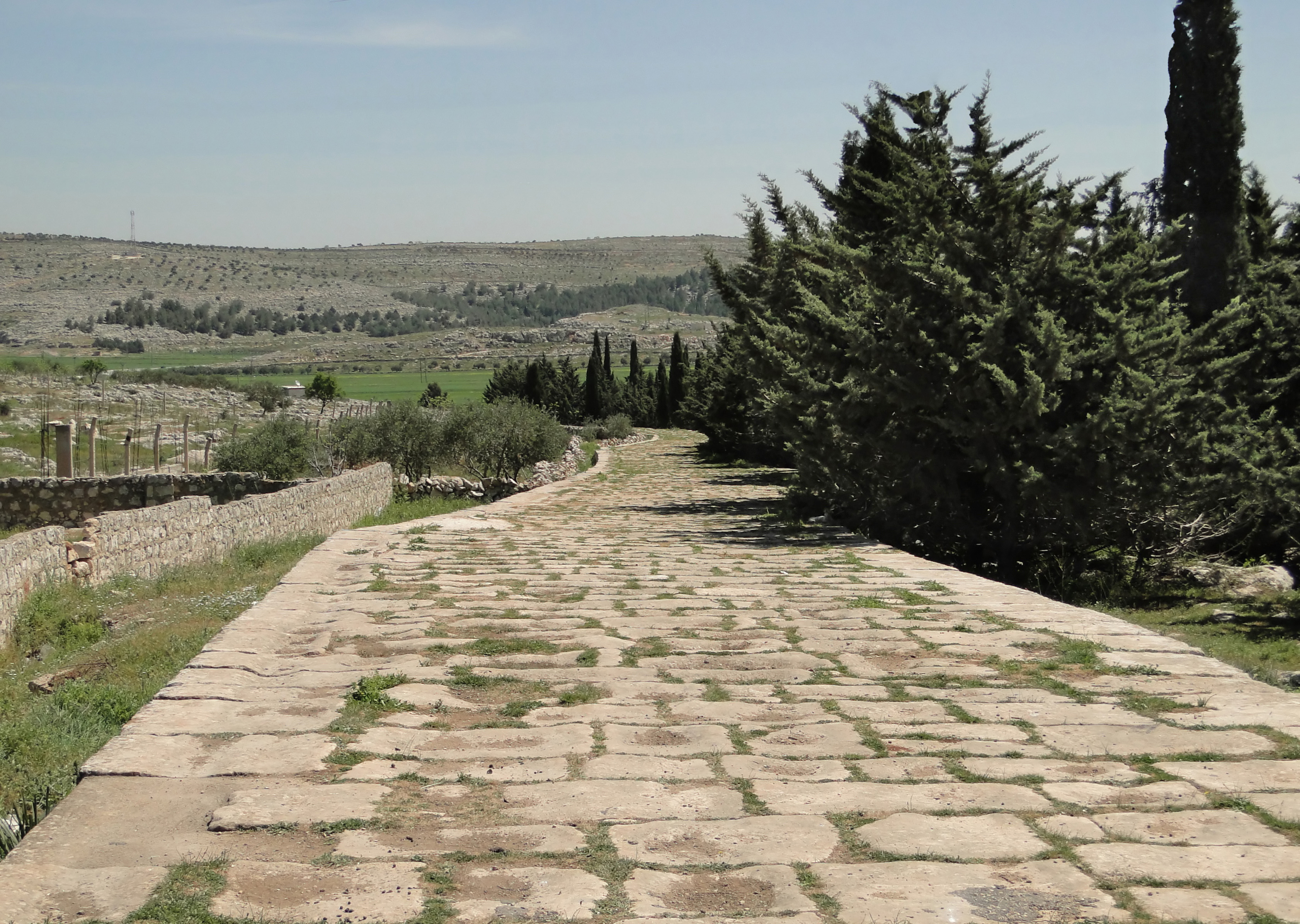
Ancient Roman road located in Syria which connected Antioch and Chalcis

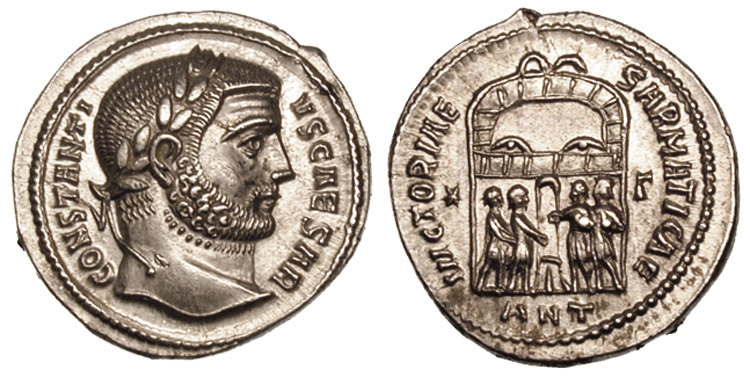
This argenteus was struck in the Antioch mint, under Constantius Chlorus.

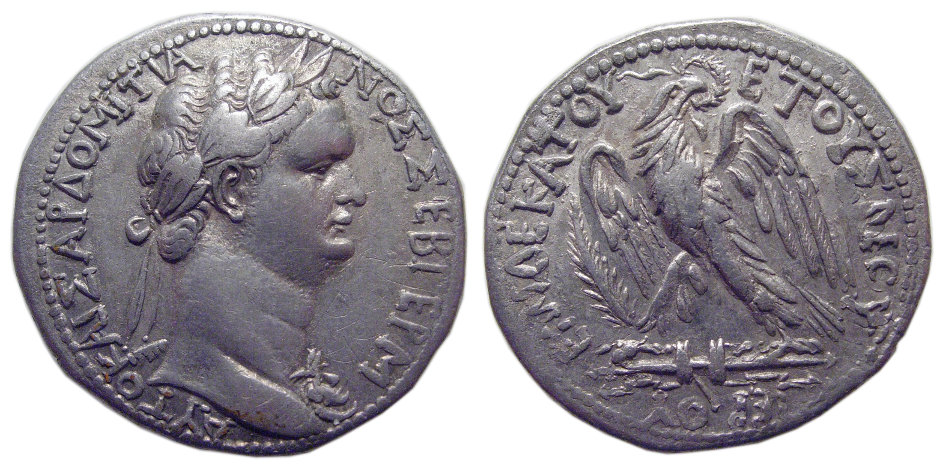
Rare Domitian Tetradrachm struck in the Antioch Mint. Only 23 known examples. Note the realist portrait, typical of the Antioch Mint.

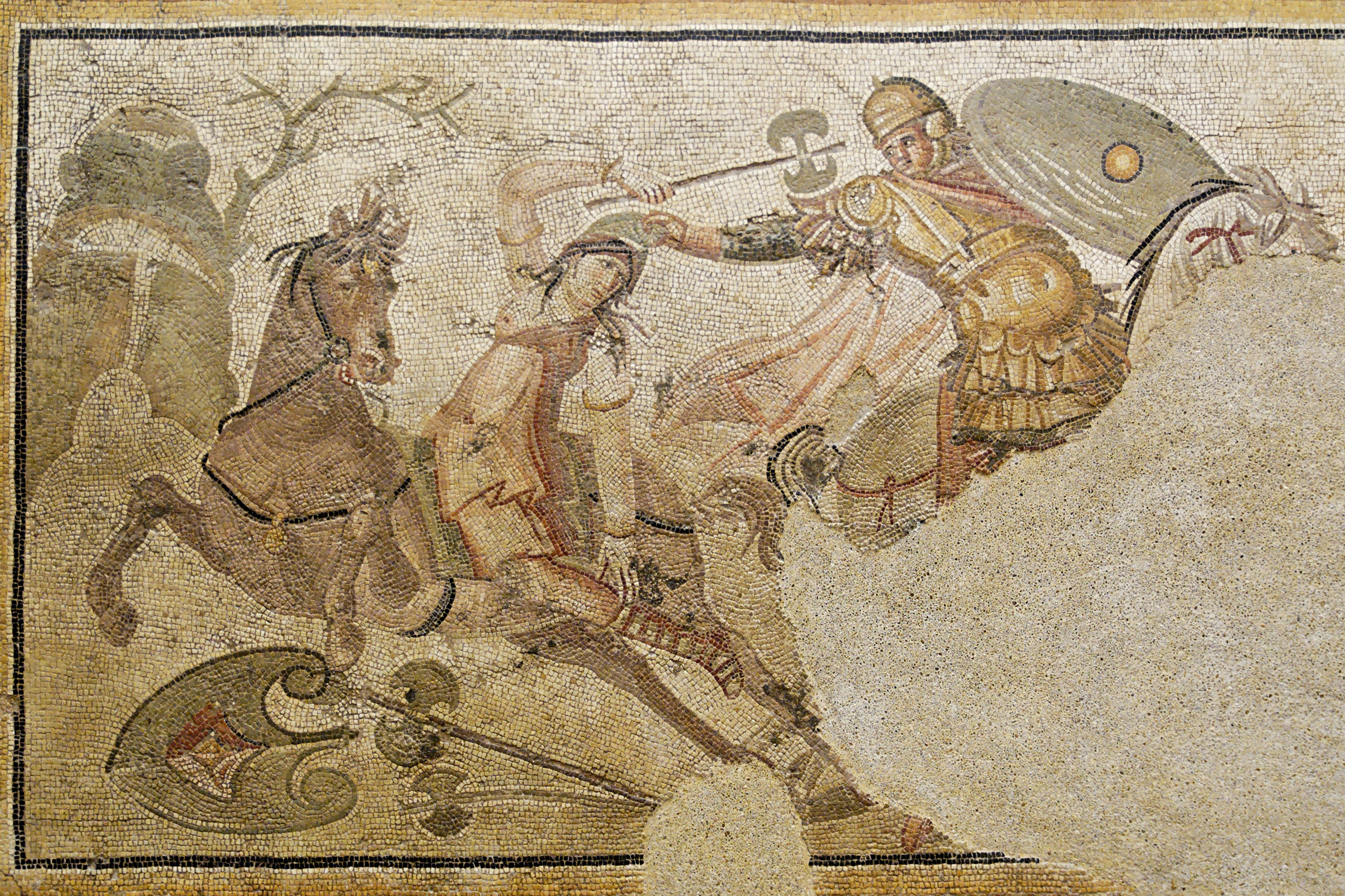
A Greek rider seizes a mounted Amazonian warrior (armed with a double-headed axe) by her Phrygian cap; Roman mosaic emblema (marble and limestone), 2nd half of the 4th century AD; from Daphne, a suburb of Antioch-on-the-Orontes (now Antakya in Turkey).

The Roman emperors favored the city, seeing it as a more suitable capital for the eastern part of the empire than Alexandria could be, because of the isolated position of Egypt. To a certain extent they tried to make it an eastern Rome. Julius Caesar visited it in 47 BC and confirmed its freedom. A great temple to Jupiter Capitolinus rose on Silpius, probably at the insistence of Octavian, whose cause the city had espoused. A Roman forum was laid out. Tiberius built two long colonnades on the south towards Silpius.

Strabo, writing in the reign of Augustus and the first years of Tiberius, states that Antioch is not much smaller than Seleucia and Alexandria; Alexandria had been said by Diodorus Siculus in the mid-1st century BC to have 300,000 free inhabitants, which would mean that Antioch was about this size in Strabo's time.

Agrippa and Tiberius enlarged the theatre, and Trajan finished their work. Antoninus Pius paved the great east to west artery with granite. Other colonnades and great numbers of baths were built, and aqueducts to supply them bore the names of caesars, the finest being the work of Hadrian. The Roman client King Herod (most likely Herod the Great), erected a long stoa on the east, and Marcus Vipsanius Agrippa encouraged the growth of a new suburb south of this.

One of the most famous Roman additions to the city was its hippodrome, the Circus of Antioch. This chariot racing venue was probably built in the reign of Augustus, when the city had more than half a million inhabitants; it was modelled on the Circus Maximus in Rome and other circus buildings throughout the empire. Measuring more than 490 metres (1,610 feet) long and 30 metres (98 feet) wide, the circus could house up to 80,000 spectators. The most important building though was the Imperial Palace. It housed the Roman emperor on occasion and may have originally been the Seleucid palace. According to Libanius, at his time the palace won in any comparison of its size and was unsurpassed in beauty.

Zarmanochegas (Zarmarus) a monk of the Sramana tradition of India, according to Strabo and Dio Cassius, met Nicholas of Damascus in Antioch around 13 AD as part of a mission to Augustus. At Antioch Germanicus died in 19 AD, and his body was burnt in the forum. An earthquake that shook Antioch in 37 caused Caligula to send two senators to report on the condition of the city. Another quake followed in the next reign. Titus visited Antioch in the spring of 71, where he encountered a crowd demanding the expulsion of Jews from the city. He refused, explaining that their country had been destroyed, and no other place would accept them. The crowd then sought to revoke the Jews' political privileges by asking Titus to remove the bronze tablets inscribed with their rights, but Titus declined once more.

In 115, during Trajan's travel there during his war against Parthia, the whole site was convulsed by a huge earthquake. The landscape altered, and Trajan was forced to take shelter in the circus for several days. He and his successor restored the city, but the population was reduced to less than 400,000 inhabitants, and many sections of the city were abandoned.

Commodus had Olympic games celebrated at Antioch. In 256 the city was suddenly raided by the Persians under Shapur I, and many of the people were slain in the theatre. The city was burned, and some 100,000 inhabitants were killed while the rest were deported to Shapur's newly built city of Gundeshapur. It was recaptured by Valerian the following year.

=== Christianity ===
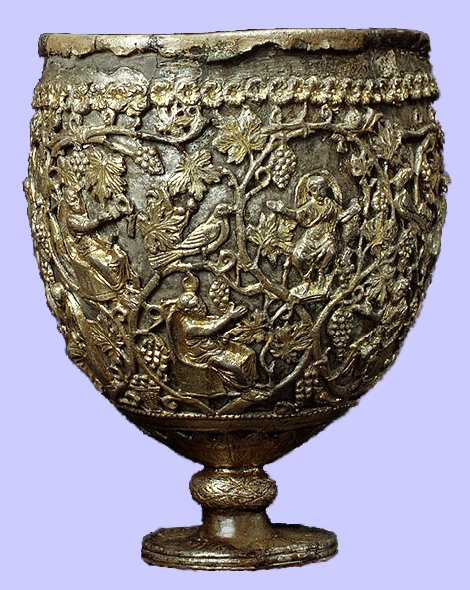
The Antioch Chalice, first half of 6th century, Metropolitan Museum of Art

Antioch was a chief center of early Christianity during Roman times, and converts there were the first people to be called Christians. The city had a large population of Jewish origin in a quarter called the Kerateion, and so attracted the earliest missionaries. Among these was Saint Peter, according to the tradition upon which the Patriarchate of Antioch still rests its claim for primacy. This is not to be confused with Antioch in Pisidia, to which Barnabas and Paul later travelled.

Between 252 and 300, ten assemblies of the church were held at Antioch, and it became the seat of one of the five original patriarchates, along with Constantinople, Jerusalem, Alexandria, and Rome. Today five churches use the title of patriarch of Antioch for their prime bishops: one Oriental Orthodox (the Syriac Orthodox Church); three Eastern Catholic (the Maronite, Syriac Catholic, and Melkite Greek Catholic Churches); and one Eastern Orthodox (the Greek Orthodox Church of Antioch). This title has been maintained though most of them have moved their seat to Damascus. This is somewhat analogous to the manner in which several popes, heads of the Roman Catholic Church remained "Bishop of Rome" even while residing in Avignon in the 14th century. The Maronite Church, which has also moved the seat away to Bkerké, Lebanon, continues the Antiochene liturgical tradition and the use of the Syro-Aramaic language in their liturgies. Emperor Constantine, who had decriminalised Christianity in 313, began the building of the Domus Aurea or Great Church in 327 which served for the next two centuries as the leading church of Antioch.

John Chrysostom writes that when Ignatius of Antioch was bishop in the city, the dêmos, probably meaning the number of free adult men and women without counting children and slaves, numbered 200,000. In a letter written in 363, Libanius says the city contains 150,000 anthrôpoi (plural of anthropos, human, a word which would ordinarily mean all human beings of any age, sex, or social status) seemingly indicating a decline in the population since the first century. Chrysostom also says in one of his homilies on the Gospel of Matthew, which were delivered between 386 and 393, that in his own time there were 100,000 Christians in Antioch, a figure which may refer to orthodox Christians who belonged to the Great Church as opposed to members of other groups such as Arians and Apollinarians, or to all Christians of any persuasion.

=== Age of Julian and Valens ===
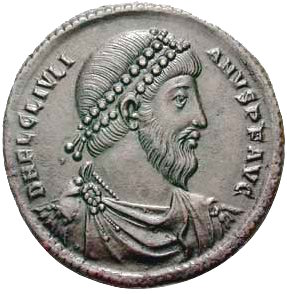
A bronze coin from Antioch depicting the emperor Julian. Note the pointed beard.

When the emperor Julian visited in 362 on a detour to the Sasanian Empire, he had high hopes for Antioch, regarding it as a rival to the imperial capital of Constantinople. Antioch had a mixed pagan and Christian population, which Ammianus Marcellinus implies lived quite harmoniously together. However, Julian's visit began ominously as it coincided with a lament for Adonis, the doomed lover of Aphrodite. Thus, Ammianus wrote, the emperor and his soldiers entered the city not to the sound of cheers but to wailing and screaming.

After being advised that the bones of 3rd-century martyred bishop Babylas were suppressing the oracle of Apollo at Daphne, he made a public-relations mistake in ordering the removal of the bones from the vicinity of the temple. The result was a massive Christian procession. Shortly after that, when the temple was destroyed by fire, Julian suspected the Christians and ordered stricter investigations than usual. He also shut up Constantine's Great Church, before the investigations proved that the fire was the result of an accident.

Julian found much else to criticize about the Antiochenes; he had wanted the empire's cities to be more self-managing, as they had been some 200 years before, but Antioch's city councilmen showed themselves unwilling to shore up a local food shortage with their own resources, so dependent were they on the emperor. Ammianus wrote that the councilmen shirked their duties by bribing unwitting men in the marketplace to do the job for them. Further, Julian was surprised and dismayed when at the city's annual feast of Apollo the only Antiochene present was an old priest clutching a goose, showing the decay of paganism in the town.

Ammianus writes that the Antiochenes hated Julian in turn for worsening the food shortage with the burden of his billeted troops. His enthusiasm for large scale animal sacrifice meant that the soldiers were often to be found gorged on sacrificial meat, making a drunken nuisance of themselves on the streets while Antioch's hungry citizens looked on in disgust. The Christian Antiochenes and Julian's pagan Gallic soldiers also never quite saw eye to eye. Even to those who kept the old religion, Julian's brand of paganism was distasteful, being very much unique to himself, with little support outside the most educated Neoplatonist circles. Julian gained no admiration for his personal involvement in the sacrifices, only the nickname axeman, wrote Ammianus. The emperor's high-handed, severe methods and his rigid administration prompted Antiochene lampoons about, among other things, Julian's unfashionably pointed beard.

Julian's successor Valens endowed Antioch with a new forum, including a statue of his brother and co-emperor Valentinian I on a central column, and reopened the great church of Constantine, which stood until the Persian sack in 538, by Khosrow.

=== Theodosius and after ===
In 387 there was a great sedition caused by a tax levied by order of Theodosius I, and the city was punished by the loss of its metropolitan status. Theodosius placed Antioch under Constantinople's rule when he divided the Roman Empire. John Malalas, a chronicler writing in the 6th century, describes a theater in the city's suburb of Daphne that was built on the ruins of a synagogue. The theater had an inscription stating it was constructed "from the spoils of Judaea". He also mentions a gate of cherubs in the city, which Titus constructed using the spoils of the Second Temple.

In 490 or 491 CE, violent anti-Jewish riots broke out in Antioch. The events are recorded in the Chronicle of John Malalas, but the surviving accounts belong to two divergent narrative traditions that have long perplexed historians. The fullest Greek manuscript (Baroccianus Graecus 182) describes a violent outbreak in which the city's Green faction indiscriminately massacred local Jews; in this version, Emperor Zeno rebuked the Greens, not in defense of the Jews, but lamenting that they had only burned corpses rather than living Jews. A different tradition, preserved in later Slavonic versions and in excerpts compiled under Constantine VII Porphyrogenitus, distinguishes two phases: an initial clash in the hippodrome between the Blues and Greens, followed months later by a Green-led pogrom against Antioch's Jews, who were reportedly allied with the rival Blue faction. According to this account, many were killed, the Asabiniani synagogue was destroyed, and Jewish graves were desecrated.

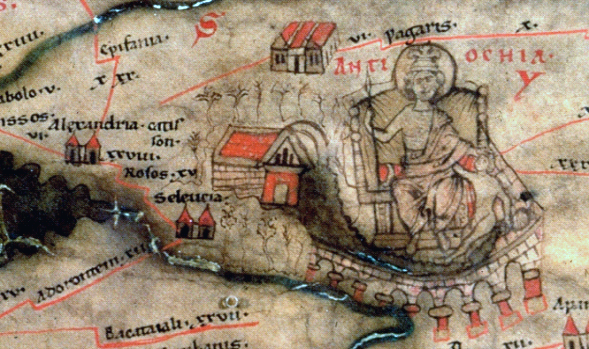
The Peutinger Map showing Antioch, Alexandria and Seleucia in the 4th century

Antioch and its port, Seleucia Pieria, were severely damaged by an earthquake in 526. Seleucia Pieria, which was already fighting a losing battle against continual silting, never recovered. A second earthquake affected Antioch in 528. Justinian I renamed Antioch Theopolis ("City of God") and restored many of its public buildings, but the destructive work was completed in 540 by Khosrow I, who deported the population to a newly built city in Persian Mesopotamia, Weh Antiok Khosrow. Antioch lost as many as 300,000 people. Justinian I made an effort to revive it, and Procopius describes his repairing of the walls; but its glory was past. Another earthquake in 588 destroyed the Domus Aureus of Constantine, whereafter the church of Cassian became the most important church of Antioch.

During the Byzantine–Sasanian War of 602–628, the emperor Heraclius confronted the invading Persian army of Khosrow II outside Antioch in 613. The Byzantines were defeated by forces under the generals Shahrbaraz and Shahin Vahmanzadegan at the Battle of Antioch, after which the city fell to the Sassanians, together with much of Syria and eastern Anatolia.

Antioch gave its name to a certain school of Christian thought, distinguished by literal interpretation of the Scriptures and insistence on the human limitations of Jesus. Diodorus of Tarsus and Theodore of Mopsuestia were the leaders of this school. The principal local saint was Simeon Stylites, who lived an extremely ascetic life atop a pillar for 40 years some 65 kilometres (40 miles) east of Antioch. His body was brought to the city and buried in a building erected under the emperor Leo. During the Byzantine era, great bathhouses were built in Byzantine centers such as Constantinople and Antioch.

== Arab and Byzantine era ==
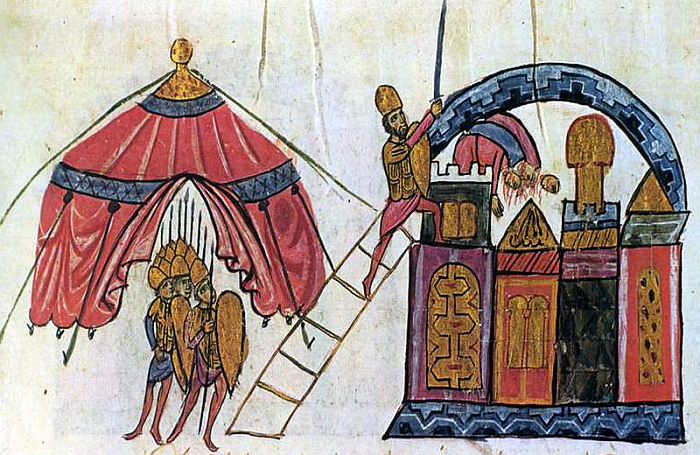
Byzantine recapture of Antioch in 969

In 637, during the reign of Heraclius, Antioch was conquered by Abu Ubayda ibn al-Jarrah of the Rashidun Caliphate during the Battle of the Iron Bridge, marking the beginning of Islamic influence in the region. The city became known in Arabic as أنطاكية Anṭākiyah. Under the Umayyad Caliphate (661–750 AD), Antioch served as a significant military and administrative center. The Umayyads fortified the city, utilizing it as a base for operations in the region. The city remained an important urban center, with its multicultural population including Christians, Muslims, and Jews living together, although there were periods of tension and conflict. However, since the Umayyad dynasty was unable to penetrate the Anatolian Plateau, Antioch found itself on the frontline of the conflicts between two hostile empires during the next 350 years, so that the city went into a precipitous decline. During the Abbasid period (750–969 AD), Antioch continued to thrive as a hub of commerce and culture. Under the Abbasids, closer relations were developed with Byzantium, but it was not until the Fatimids opened up the Mediterranean for shipping from the end of the 10th century that the affairs of western Europe and the Near East began to interact once again. The Abbasids placed a strong emphasis on trade, which facilitated economic prosperity in Antioch. The city became known for its diverse markets, contributing to the flow of goods and ideas between the Islamic world and the Byzantine Empire.

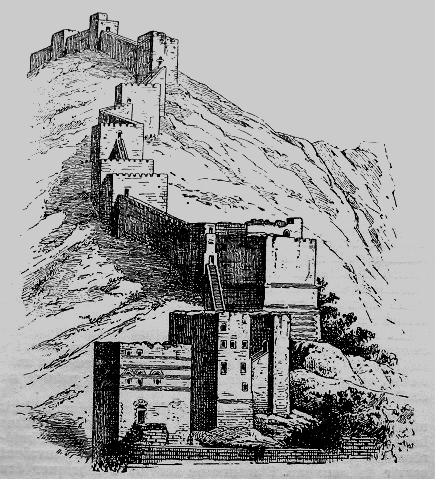
The ramparts of Antioch climbing Mons Silpius during the Crusades (lower left on the map, above left)

The decline of Arab rule in Antioch began in the late 9th century with increasing pressure from the Byzantine forces. The city changed hands several times during the Byzantine-Arab wars, before finally in 969, under the Byzantine Emperor Nikephoros II Phokas, the city was captured after a siege by the Byzantine general Michael Bourtzes and the stratopedarches Peter. It soon became the seat of a doux, the civil governor of the homonymous theme, but also the seat of the somewhat more important Domestic of the Schools of the Orient, the supreme military commander of the imperial forces on the eastern frontier. Sometimes both offices were held by the same person, usually military officers such as Nikephoros Ouranos, or Philaretos Brachamios, who managed to retain the integrity of the eastern borderline after the Seljuk conquest of Anatolia. The size of the Melkite community increased during that time due to immigration from Christians from Fatimid Egypt but also other parts of the Near East, and Christians remained the dominant population up to the Crusades.

As the empire disintegrated rapidly before the Komnenian restoration, Dux of Antioch & Domestic of the Schools of the East Philaretos Brachamios held the city until Suleiman ibn Qutalmish, the emir of Rum, captured it from him in 1084. Two years later, Suleiman was killed fighting against Tutush, the brother of the Seljuk Sultan, who annexed the city into the Seljuk Empire. Yagisiyan was appointed governor. He became increasingly independent within the tumultuous years following Malik-Shah's death in 1092.

== Crusader era ==
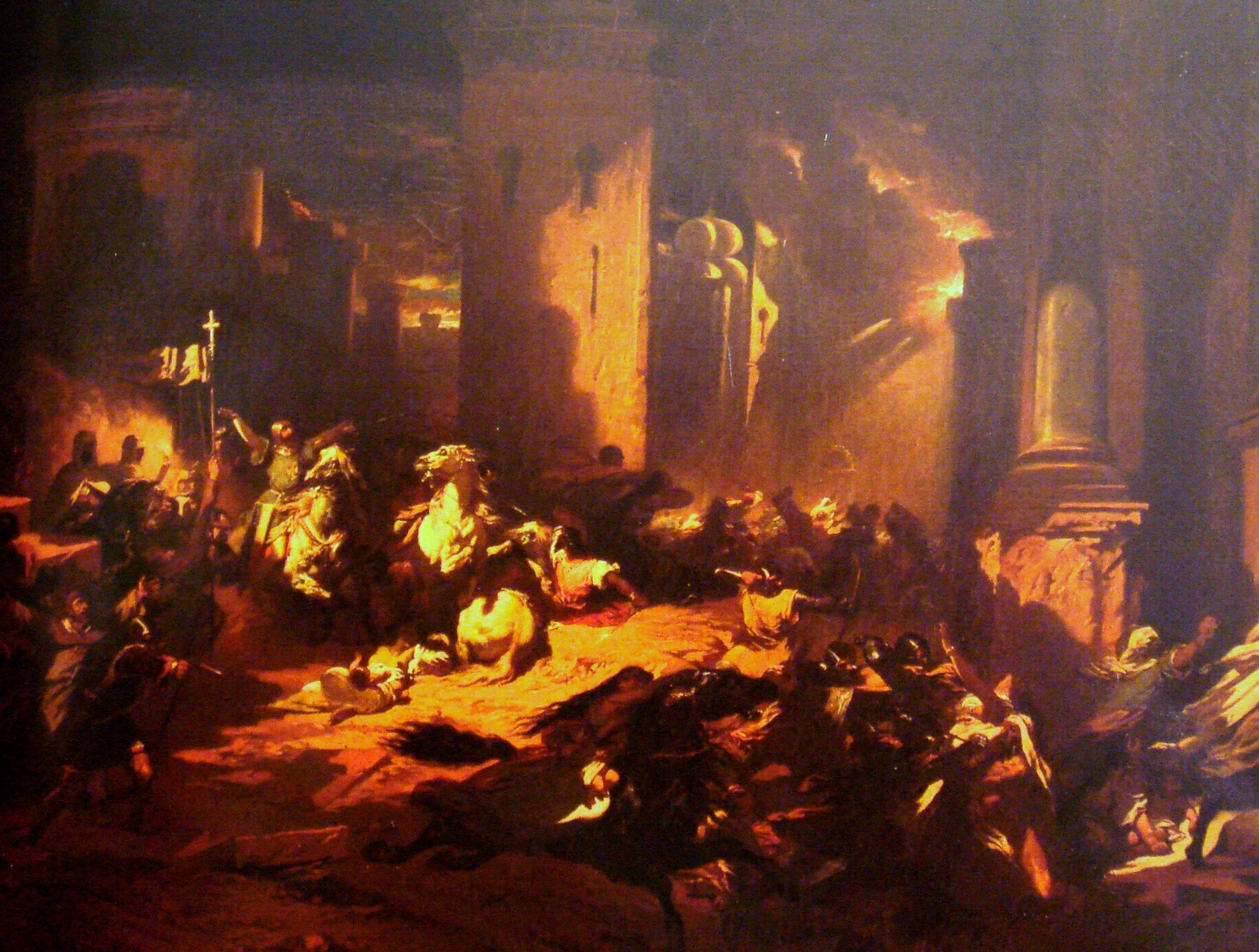
A 19th-century painting of the capture of Antioch by Bohemund of Taranto in June 1098

The Crusaders' siege of Antioch conquered the city in June 1098 after a siege lasting eight months on their way to Jerusalem. At this time, the bulk of far eastern trade traveled through Egypt, but in the second half of the 12th century Nur ed-Din and later Saladin brought order to Muslim Syria, opening up long-distance trade routes, including to Antioch and on to its new port, St Symeon, which had replaced Seleucia Pieria. However, the Mongol conquests of the 13th century altered the main trade routes from the far east, as they encouraged merchants to take the overland route through Mongol territory to the Black Sea, reducing the prosperity of Antioch. Surrounding the city were a number of Greek, Syrian, Georgian, Armenian, and Latin monasteries.

=== Consolidation of the Principality ===
In 1100, Tancred became the regent of Antioch after his uncle and predecessor Bohemond I of Antioch was taken prisoner from 1100 to 1103 by Gazi Gümüshtigin of the Danishmends at the Battle of Melitene. Tancred expanded the territory of Antioch by conquering Byzantine Cilicia, Tarsus, and Adana in 1101. In 1107 Bohemond, enraged by an earlier defeat, renamed Tancred as the regent of Antioch so he could sail for Europe with the intent of gaining support for an attack against the Greeks.

Bohemond laid siege to Dyrrachium but capitulated in September 1108 and was forced to accede to a peace accord, the Treaty of Devol which stipulated that Bohemond was to hold Antioch for the remainder of his life as the emperor's subject and the Greek patriarch was to be restored to power in the city. However, Tancred refused to honor the treaty in which Bohemond swore an oath, and it is not until 1156 that it truly became a vassal state of the Byzantine Empire. Six months after the treaty Bohemond died, and Tancred remained regent of Antioch until his death during a typhoid epidemic in 1112.

After the death of Tancred, the principality passed to Roger of Salerno, who helped rebuild Antioch after an earthquake destroyed its foundations in 1114. With the death of Roger at the Battle of Ager Sanguinis in 1119, the role of regent was assumed by Baldwin II of Jerusalem, lasting until 1126. In 1126 Bohemond II arrived from Apulia to gain regency over Antioch. In 1130 Bohemond was lured into an ambush by Leo I, Prince of Armenia who allied with the Danishmend Gazi Gümüshtigin, and was killed in the subsequent battle.

Antioch was again ruled by a regency, firstly being Baldwin II, after his daughter and Bohemond II's wife, Alice of Antioch attempted to block Baldwin from entering Antioch, but failed when Antiochene nobles such as Fulk of Jerusalem (Alice's brother-in-law) opened up the gates for representatives of Baldwin II. Alice was then expelled from Antioch. With the death of Baldwin in 1131, Alice briefly took control of Antioch and allied herself with Pons of Tripoli and Joscelin II of Edessa in an attempt to prevent Fulk from marching north in 1132; however, this attempt failed. In 1133 the king chose Raymond of Poitiers as a groom for Constance of Antioch, daughter of Bohemund II of Antioch and Alice. The marriage took place in 1136 between the 21-year-old Raymond and the 9-year-old Constance.

Immediately after assuming control, Raymond was involved in conflicts with the Byzantine Emperor John II Comnenus who had come south to recover Cilicia from Leo of Armenia, and to reassert his rights over Antioch. The engagement lasted until 1137 when John arrived with an army before the walls of Antioch. Although the basileus did not enter the city, his banner was raised atop the citadel, and Raymond was compelled to do homage. Raymond agreed with the emperor that if he was capable of capturing Aleppo, Shaizar, and Homs, he would exchange Antioch for them. John went on to attack Aleppo with the aid of Antioch and Edessa, and failed to capture it, with the Franks withdrawing their support when he moved on to capture Shaizar. John returned to Antioch ahead of his army and entered Antioch, only to be forced to leave when Joscelin II, Count of Edessa rallied the citizens to oust him. After the fall of Edessa in 1144, many Syriac Orthodox Christians came into the city, spreading the veneration of Mor Barsauma among the local population which resulted in the building of a church to the saint in 1156.

=== Second Crusade ===
Nur ad-Din Zangi attacked Antioch in both 1147 and 1148 and succeeded during the second venture in occupying most of the territory east of the Orontes but failed to capture Antioch itself. Louis VII of France arrived in Antioch on 19 March 1148, where he was welcomed by the uncle of his spouse Eleanor of Aquitaine, Raymond of Poitiers. Louis refused to help Antioch defend against the Turks and to lead an expedition against Aleppo, and instead decided to finish his pilgrimage to Jerusalem rather than focus on the military aspect of the Crusades.

With Raymond dead and Bohemond III only five years of age, the principality came under the control of Constance; however, real control lay with Aimery of Limoges. In 1153, Constance chose Raynald of Châtillon and married him in secret without consulting her first cousin and liege lord, Baldwin III, and neither Baldwin nor Aimery of Limoges approved of her choice. In 1156 Raynald claimed that the Byzantine emperor Manuel I Comnenus had reneged on his promises to pay Raynald a sum of money, and would later attack Cyprus. This caused Manuel to raise an army to Syria. Raynald then surrendered, the emperor insisted on the installation of a Greek Patriarch and the surrender of the citadel in Antioch. The following spring, Manuel made a triumphant entry into the city and established himself as the unquestioned suzerain of Antioch.

In 1160 Raynald was captured by Muslims and held captive for 16 years. With Raynald disposed, the patriarch Aimery became the regent, chosen by Baldwin III. To further consolidate his own claim over Antioch, Manuel chose Maria of Antioch (daughter of Constance and Raymond) as his bride. Antioch remained in crisis until 1163 when Constance asked the Armenia to help maintain her rule, as a result the citizens of Antioch exiled her and installed her son Bohemond III and now brother-in-law to the emperor, as regent.

One year later, Nur ad-Din Zangi captured Bohemond III but was soon released; however, Harem, Syria, which Raynald had recaptured in 1158, was lost again and the frontier of Antioch was permanently placed west of the Orontes.

=== Third Crusade ===
While travelling on crusade, Emperor Frederick Barbarossa drowned in the river Saleph. His son, Frederick VI, then led the remnant of the Crusader army south towards Antioch. Subsequently, he arranged for his father's remains to be buried in the Cathedral of Saint Peter in Antioch. Throughout the Third Crusade, Antioch remained neutral; however, with the end of the Third Crusade (1192), they were included in the Treaty of Ramla between Richard and Saladin.

Henry II, Count of Champagne travelled to Lesser Armenia and managed to persuade Leo that in exchange for Antioch, renouncing its overlordship to Lesser Armenia and to release Bohemond, who died in 1201. With the death of Bohemond III there followed a 15-year struggle for power of Antioch, between Tripoli and Lesser Armenia. According to the rules of primogeniture Leo's great nephew Raymond-Roupen was the rightful heir of Antioch, and Leo's position was supported by the pope. On the other hand, however, the city commune of Antioch supported Bohemond IV of Antioch, on the grounds that he was the closest blood relative to the last ruling prince, Bohemond III. In 1207 Bohemond IV installed a Greek patriarch in Antioch, despite the East–West Schism, under the help of Aleppo, Bohemond IV drove Leo out of Antioch.

=== Fifth Crusade ===
The calling of the Fifth Crusade strengthened the support of Ayyubid Sultan al-Adil I who supported Raymond-Roupen's claims in Antioch. In 1216 Leo installed Raymond-Roupen as prince of Antioch, ending all military aspect of the struggle between Tripoli and Lesser Armenia, but the citizens again revolted against Raymond-Roupen in c. 1219 and Bohemond of Tripoli was recognised as prince. From 1233 onwards Antioch declined and appeared rarely in records for 30 years, and in 1254 the altercations of the past between Antioch and Armenia were laid to rest when Bohemond VI of Antioch married the then 17‑year‑old Sibylla of Armenia, and Bohemond VI became a vassal of the Armenian kingdom. Effectively, the Armenian kings ruled Antioch while the prince of Antioch resided in Tripoli. The Armenians drew up a treaty with the Mongols, who were now ravaging Muslim lands, and under protection they extended their territory into the lands of the Seljuq dynasty in the north and the Aleppo territory to the south. Antioch was part of this Armeno-Mongol alliance. Bohemond VI managed to retake Lattakieh and reestablished the land bridge between Antioch and Tripoli, while the Mongols insisted he install the Greek patriarch there rather than a Latin one as the Mongols wanted to strengthen ties to the Orthodox Byzantines.

=== Fall of Antioch ===
In 1268, Baybars besieged Antioch, capturing the city on 18 May. Baibars promised to spare the lives of the inhabitants, but broke his promise and razed the city, killing or enslaving nearly the entire population upon their surrender. Antioch's ruler, Prince Bohemond VI was then left with no territories except the County of Tripoli. Without any southern fortifications and with Antioch isolated it could not withstand the resurgent Muslim forces, and with the fall of the city, the remainder of northern Syria eventually capitulated, ending the Latin presence in Syria. The Mamluk armies killed or enslaved every Christian in Antioch. In 1355 it still had a considerable population, but by 1432 there were only about 300 inhabited houses within its walls, mostly occupied by Turcomans.

== Ottoman period ==
Antioch was incorporated into the Ottoman Empire with the conquest of Syria in 1516. It formed a sub-province (sancak) or tax collectorship (muhassıllık) of the province of Aleppo (Aleppo Eyalet). Beginning in the mid-18th century, the district witnessed an influx of Alawite settlers coming from the Latakia area. The famous Barker family of British consuls had a summer home in Suwaydiyya (today's Samandağ), at the mouth of the Orontes River, in the 19th century. Between 1831 and 1840, Antioch was the military headquarters of Ibrahim Pasha of Egypt during the Egyptian occupation of Syria, and served as a model site for the modernising reforms he wished to institute.

== Archaeology ==
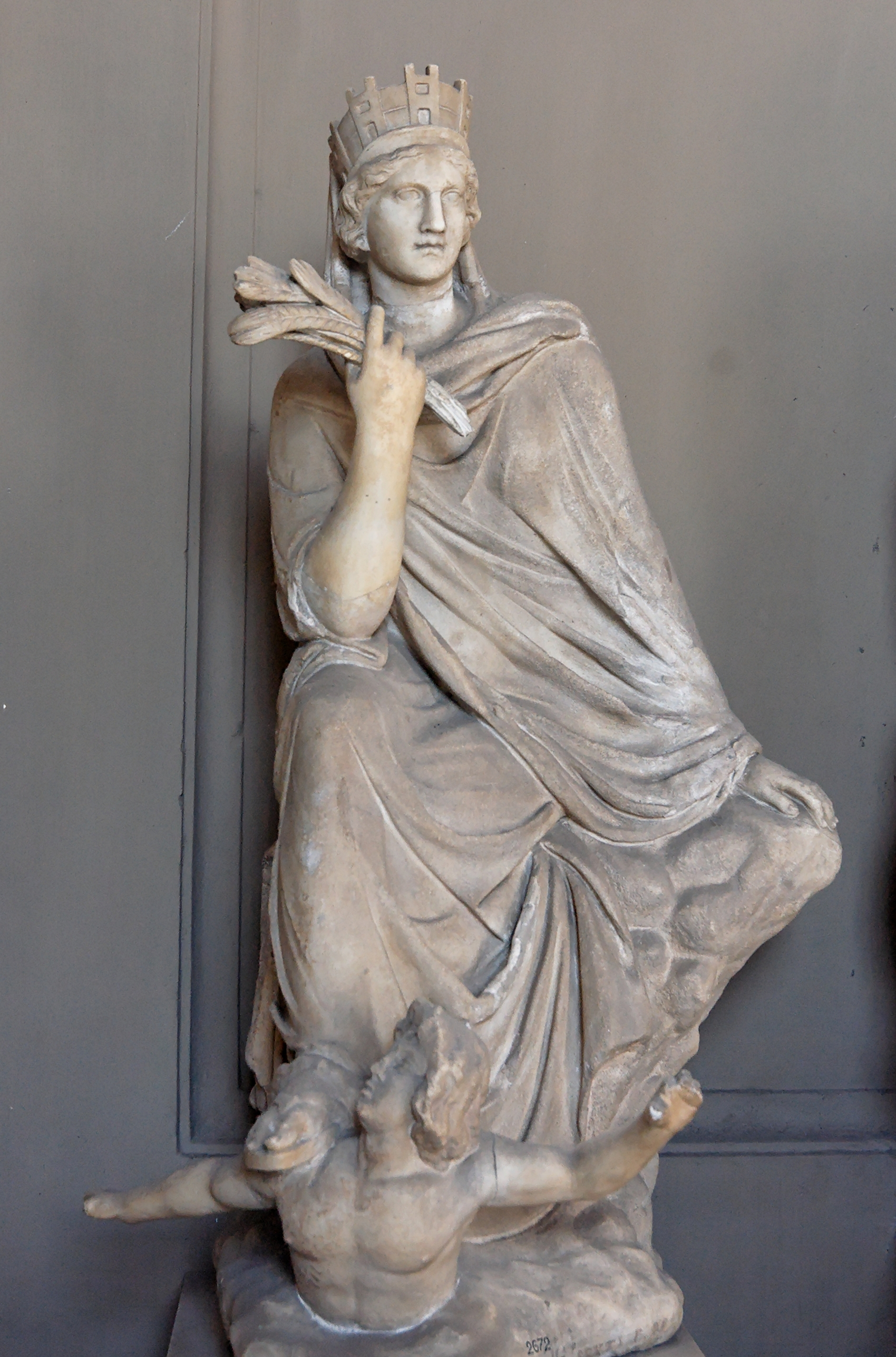
The Týkhē (Fortune) of Antioch, Galleria dei Candelabri, the Vatican Museums

Few traces of the once great Roman city are visible today aside from the massive fortification walls that snake up the mountains to the east of the modern city, several aqueducts, and the Church of St Peter (St Peter's Cave Church, Cave-Church of St. Peter), said to be a meeting place of an early Christian community. The majority of the Roman city lies buried beneath deep sediments from the Orontes River, or has been obscured by recent construction.

Between 1932 and 1939, archaeological excavations of Antioch were undertaken under the direction of the "Committee for the Excavation of Antioch and Its Vicinity", which was made up of representatives from the Louvre Museum, the Baltimore Museum of Art, the Worcester Art Museum, Princeton University, Wellesley College, and later (1936) also the Fogg Art Museum at Harvard University and its affiliate Dumbarton Oaks. The excavation team failed to find the major buildings they hoped to unearth, including Constantine's Great Octagonal Church or the imperial palace. However, a great accomplishment of the expedition was the discovery of high-quality Roman mosaics from villas and baths in Antioch, Daphne and Seleucia Pieria.

The principal excavations by Princeton University in March 1932 recovered nearly 300 mosaics. Many of these mosaics were originally displayed as floor mosaics in private homes during the second through sixth centuries AD, while others were displayed in baths and other public buildings. The majority of the Antioch mosaics are from the fourth and fifth centuries, Antioch's golden age, though others from earlier times have survived as well. The mosaics depict a variety of images including animals, plants, and mythological beings, as well as scenes from the daily lives of people living in the area at the time. Each mosaic is bordered by intricate designs and contains bold, vibrant colours. One mosaic includes a border that depicts a walk from Antioch to Daphne, showing many ancient buildings along the way. The mosaics are now displayed in the Hatay Archaeology Museum in Antakya. A collection of mosaics on both secular and sacred subjects which were once in churches, private homes, and other public spaces now hang in the Princeton University Art Museum and museums of other sponsoring institutions. The non-Islamic coins from the excavations were published by Dorothy B. Waage.

A statue in the Vatican and a number of figurines and statuettes perpetuate the type of its great patron goddess and civic symbol, the Tyche (Fortune) of Antioch – a majestic seated figure, crowned with the ramparts of Antioch's walls and holding wheat stalks in her right hand, with the river Orontes as a youth swimming under her feet. According to William Robertson Smith the Tyche of Antioch was originally a young virgin sacrificed at the time of the founding of the city to ensure its continued prosperity and good fortune.

The northern edge of Antakya has been growing rapidly over recent years, and this construction has begun to expose large portions of the ancient city, which are frequently bulldozed and rarely protected by the local museum. In April 2016, archaeologists discovered a Greek mosaic showing a skeleton lying down with a wine pitcher and loaf of bread alongside a text that reads: "Be cheerful, enjoy your life", it is reportedly from the 3rd century BC. Described as the "reckless skeleton" or "skeleton mosaic", the mosaic is once thought to have belonged in the dining room of an upper-class home.

== Notable people ==
- Abba Judan, philanthropist
- Arcadius of Antioch, Greek grammarian
- Asclepiades of Antioch, Patriarch of Antioch
- Saint Barnabas, one of the prominent Christian disciples in Jerusalem
- Saint Domnius, Bishop of Salona and patron saint of Split
- Dorotheus of Gaza, 6th century monk and writer
- George of Antioch, the first to hold the office of ammiratus ammiratorum
- Ignatius of Antioch, Patriarch of Antioch
- John Malalas, a Greek chronicler
- John Chrysostom (349–407), Patriarch of Constantinople
- Libanius (4th century AD), pagan sophist and confidant of Emperor Julian
- Saint Luke (1st century AD), Christian evangelist and author of the Gospel of St. Luke and Acts of the Apostles
- Severus of Antioch, the Patriarch of Antioch, and the head of the Syriac Orthodox Church
- Aulus Licinius Archias, Greek poet
- Tiberius Claudius Pompeianus, Roman politician and general
- Saint Maron, Patriarch of the Maronite Church
- Theophilus of Antioch, Patriarch of Antioch from c. 169 to c. 183

== See also ==
- Antiochene Rite
- Holy Hand Grenade of Antioch from Monty Python
- Library of Antioch
- List of Crusader castles
- List of Greek place names
- The Martyr of Antioch
- Theophilus of Antioch
