= Ya-Sin =

36th chapter of the Qur'an

Surah 36 of the Quran
يٰسٓ Yā`Sīn Yāʾ Sīn
- Qira'ah; English text
- Classification: Meccan
- Position: Juzʼ 22 to 23
- No. of verses: 83
- No. of Rukus: 5
- No. of words: 730
- No. of letters: 2988

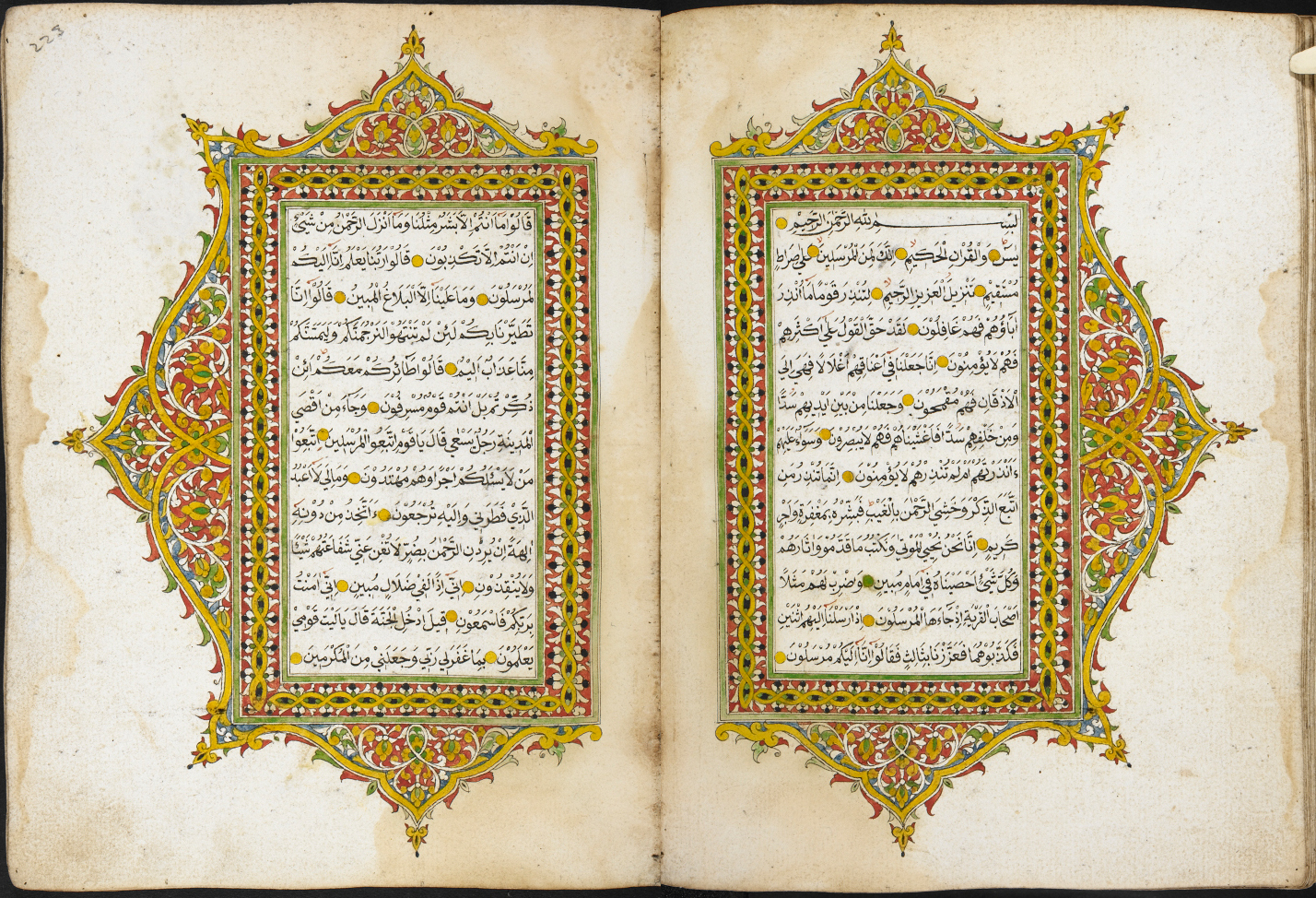
Double-page with illuminated frames marking the start of Chapter Ya-Sin in a Malay Qur'an manuscript from Patani. Despite the special significance of surah Ya-sin in lives of all Muslims, "this is the only Southeast Asian Qur'an manuscript known in which the beginning of Surat Yasin is marked with illuminated frames". 2nd half of the 19th century. British Library

Yā Sīn (also pronounced as Yaseen; Arabic: يٰسٓ, yāsīn; the letters 'Yā'' and 'Sīn') is the 36th chapter of the Quran. It has 83 verses (āyāt). It is regarded an earlier "Meccan surah". Some scholars maintain that verse 12 is from the Medinan period. While the surah begins in Juz' 22, most of it is in Juz' 23.

The surah begins with the eponymous (muqatta'at) Arabic letters: يس (yā sīn). The meaning of the letters yā sīn, while being primarily unknown, is debated amongst Muslim religious academics. One of the interpretations is "O human being!" referring to Prophet Muhammad since the verses that follow are translated as "By the Qur'an, full of Wisdom, Thou art indeed one of the messengers". Tafsir al-Jalalayn, a Sunni beginners exegesis (tafsir), concludes, "Allah knows best what He means by these [letters]."

The surah focuses on establishing the Qur'an as a divine source, and it warns of the fate of those who mock Allah's revelations and are stubborn. The surah tells of the punishments that plagued past generations of nonbelievers as a warning to present and future generations. Additionally, the surah reiterates Allah's sovereignty as exemplified by his creations through signs from nature.

The surah ends with arguments in favor of the existence of resurrection and Allah's sovereign power.

== Summary ==
- 1–3 Allah swears that Muhammad is a prophet
- 4–5 The Quran is given to warn the Meccans
- 6–9 The greater part of the people of Makkah reprobate
- 10–11 Muhammad's preaching only profitable to secret believers
- 12 The dead shall be raised; all their deeds are registered
- 13–14 Two, then three, messengers were sent to a town, though their names are not mentioned
- 15–18 They are rejected as impostors and threatened with stoning
- 19 The messengers warn the people impending divine judgments
- 20–26 One believer is put to death by the infidels
- 27–28 The persecutors are suddenly destroyed
- 29 Men generally reject God's messengers
- 30 The lessons of the past are forgotten
- 31–33 The doctrine of the resurrection asserted and illustrated
- 34–44 God's power and goodness manifested by his works
- 45–46 Unbelievers unmoved by either fear or the signs of the Quran
- 47–48 They scoff at almsgiving and the resurrection
- 49–53 The resurrection trumpet and the judgment-day shall surprise the unbelievers
- 54 God's judgment shall be according to works
- 55–65 The rewards of the righteous and the punishment of the wicked
- 66–68 God deals with the wicked as he pleases
- 69–70 Muhammad not a poet; the Quran is the word of God
- 71–73 God manifest in his works of benevolence
- 74–75 Idolaters will find their trust in idols vain
- 76 The Prophet is not to grieve at the hard speeches of the idolaters; God knows all
- 77–81 The Creator of all things able to raise the dead to life
- 82 God says Be, and it is
- 83 Praise be to the Sovereign Creator and raiser of the dead

== Heart of the Quran ==
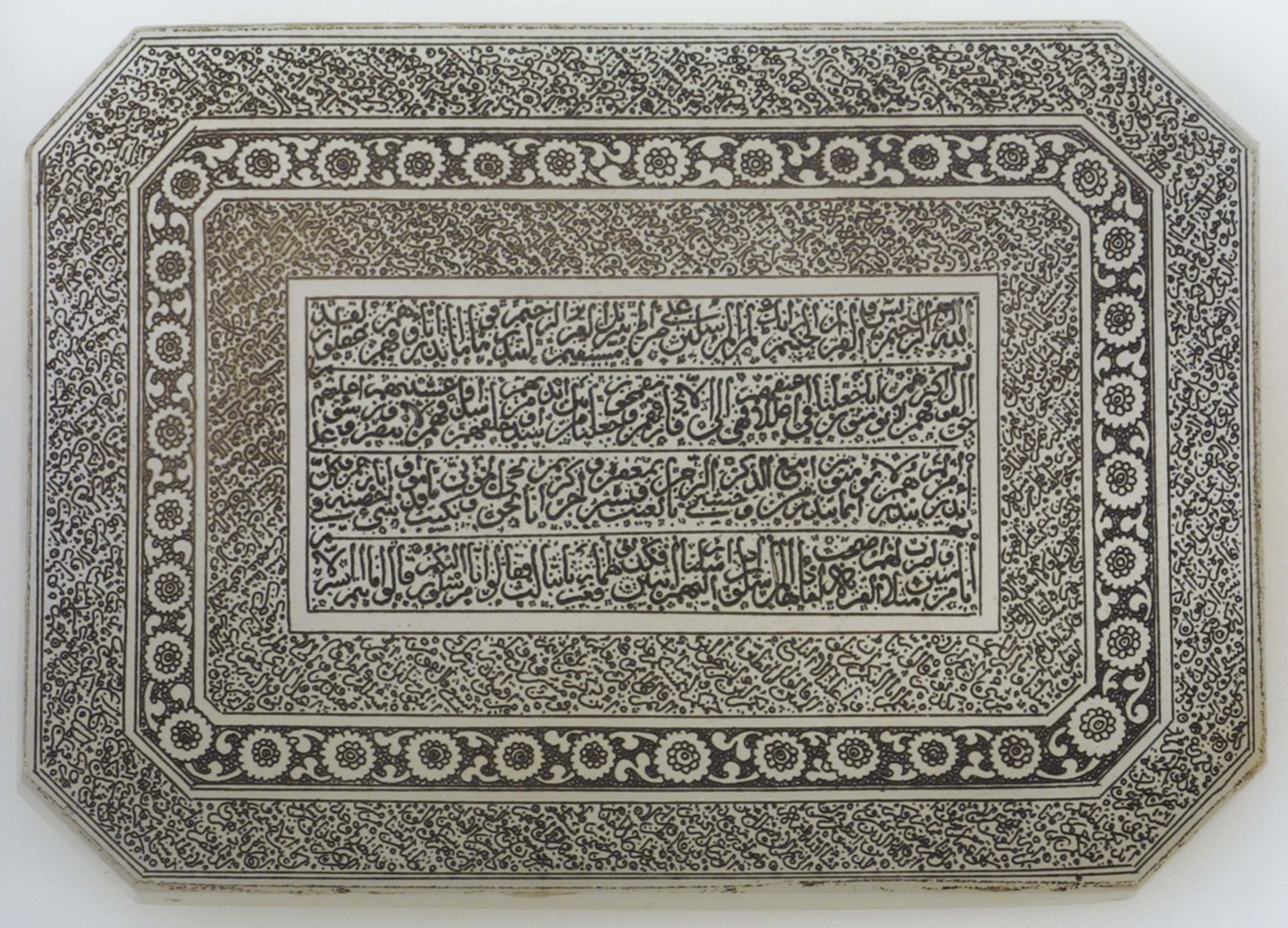
17th century Indian talisman with the text of the sura in micro-calligraphed, Khalili Collection of Islamic Art

It has been proposed that yā sīn is the "heart of the Quran". The meaning of "the heart" has been the basis of much scholarly discussion. The quality of this surah is traditionally regarded as representative of the miraculous nature of the Quran. It's the essential themes of the Quran, such as the sovereignty of Allah, the unlimited power of Allah as exemplified by his creations, Paradise, the punishment of nonbelievers, resurrection, the struggle of believers against polytheists and nonbelievers, and the reassurance that the believers are on the right path, among others. Yā Sīn presents the message of the Quran in comprehensive manner in quick and rhythmic verses. This surah says that Muhammad was not a poet, rather that he was the greatest and the Last Messenger of Allah (the "Seal of the Prophets").

== Virtues ==
It is reported in Sunan al-Darimi that Prophet Muhammad said, "Whoever recites Yā-Sīn in the early morning, his needs for that day will be fulfilled." Although it is graded as weak (da'if), a similar suspended (mawquf) narration from Ibn Abbas states, "Whoever recites Yā-Sīn in the morning, there will be ease for him until the evening, and whoever recites Yā-Sīn at night, there will be ease for him until the morning." It has been graded as either authentic (sahih) or good (hasan).

== Sections and themes ==
There are three main themes of yā-sīn: the oneness of God (tawhid); Risala, that Muhammad is a messenger sent by God to guide his creations through divine revelation; and the reality of Akhirah, the Last Judgment. 36:70 "This is a revelation, an illuminating Qur'an to warn anyone who is truly alive, so that God's verdict may be passed against the disbelievers." The surah repeatedly warns of the consequences of not believing in the legitimacy or the revelation of Muhammad, and encourages believers to remain steadfast and resist the mockery, oppression, and ridicule they receive from polytheists and nonbelievers. The arguments arise in three forms: a historical parable, a reflection on the order in the universe, and lastly a discussion of resurrection and human accountability.

The chapter begins with an affirmation of the legitimacy of Muhammad. For example, verses 2–6, "By the wise Qur'an, you [Muhammad] are truly one of the messengers sent of a straight path, with a revelation from the Almighty, the Lord of Mercy, to warn a people whose forefathers were not warned, and so they are unaware." The first passage, verses 1–12, focuses primarily with promoting the Qur'an as guidance and establishing that it is God's sovereign choice who will believe and who will not. It is stated that regardless of a warning, the nonbelievers cannot be swayed to believe. 36:10 "It is all the same to them whether you warn them or not: they will not believe."

Surah Yā-Sīn then proceeds to tell the tale of the messengers that were sent to warn nonbelievers, but who were rejected. Although the messengers proclaimed to be legitimate, they were accused of being ordinary men by the nonbelievers. 36:15–,17 "They said, 'Truly, we are messengers to you,' but they answered, 'You are only men like ourselves. The Lord of Mercy has sent nothing; you are just lying." However, a man from amongst these people beseeched them to believe in the messengers. "Then there came running, from the farthest part of the City, a man, saying, 'O my people! Obey the messengers: Obey those who ask no reward of you (for themselves), and who have themselves received Guidance.'"^{[Quran 36:20]} Upon his death, the man entered Paradise, and lamented the fate of the nonbelievers. 36:26 "He was told, 'Enter the Garden,' so he said, 'If only my people knew how my Lord has forgiven me and set me among the highly honored." This surah is meant to warn the nonbelievers of the consequences of their denial. Verse 36:30 goes on to state: "Alas for human beings! Whenever a messenger comes to them they ridicule him." Ultimately, it is God's will who will be blind and who will see. Comparative scholars and classical exegetes have noted narrative and thematic parallels between this account and passages in the Acts of the Apostles within the New Testament. Both texts depict divine envoys who are rejected by municipal authorities for preaching without seeking financial gain. The narrative arc of the anonymous believer, traditionally identified in Islamic literature as Habib the Carpenter, closely mirrors that of Stephen in Acts 6-7, as both individuals confront their local populace, face execution for their testimony, and express concern for the spiritual state of their persecutors as they transition into the afterlife. Furthermore, while classical Islamic tafsir traditions locate the Quranic narrative in Antioch, exegetes frequently identify the messengers with early Christian apostles such as Peter and John, whose confrontation with the Sanhedrin in Jerusalem is recounted in Acts 4. Ultimately, the surah uses this passage to illustrate the consequences of denial

The following passage addresses the signs of God's supremacy over nature. This is presented by the sign of revived land, the sign of day and night, the sign of the arc and the flood, and the sign of the sudden blast that arrives on the day of judgement. 36:33–37 The sign of revived land follows:

There is a sign for them in this lifeless earth: We give it life and We produce grains from it for them to eat; We have put gardens of date palms and grapes in the earth, and We have made water gush out of it so that they could eat its fruit. It is not their own hands that made all this. How can they not give thanks? Glory be to Him who created all the pairs of things that the earth produces, as well as themselves and other things they do not know about.

The disbelievers do not recognize God's power in the natural world, although he is the one Creator.

The surah further addresses what will happen to those who reject the right path presented by Muhammad and refuse to believe in God. On the last day, the day of reckoning, the nonbelievers will be held accountable for their actions and will be punished accordingly. God warned the nonbelievers of Satan, and yet Satan led them astray. 36:60–63 "Children of Adam, did I not command you not to serve Satan, for he was your sworn enemy, but to serve Me? This is the straight path. He has led great numbers of you astray. Did you not use your reason? So this is the fire that you were warned against." Although God warned them against following Satan, the nonbelievers were deaf, and so now they will suffer the consequences of their ill judgements. 36:63 "So this is the Fire that you were warned against. Enter it today, because you went on ignoring [my commands]."

The surah proceeds to address the clear nature of the revelation and assure that Muhammad is a legitimate prophet. 36:69 states, "We have not taught the Prophet poetry, nor could he ever have been a poet." Yā-Sīn concludes by reaffirming God's sovereignty and absolute power. 36:82_83 "When He wills something to be, His way is to say, 'Be'—and it is! So glory be to Him in whose Hand lies control over all things. It is to Him that you will all be brought back." It is to God, the one Creator who holds everything in his hands, that everything returns. The closing passage carries an essential message of the Qur'an.
