= People of Ya-Sin =

Group of apostles mentioned in the Quran

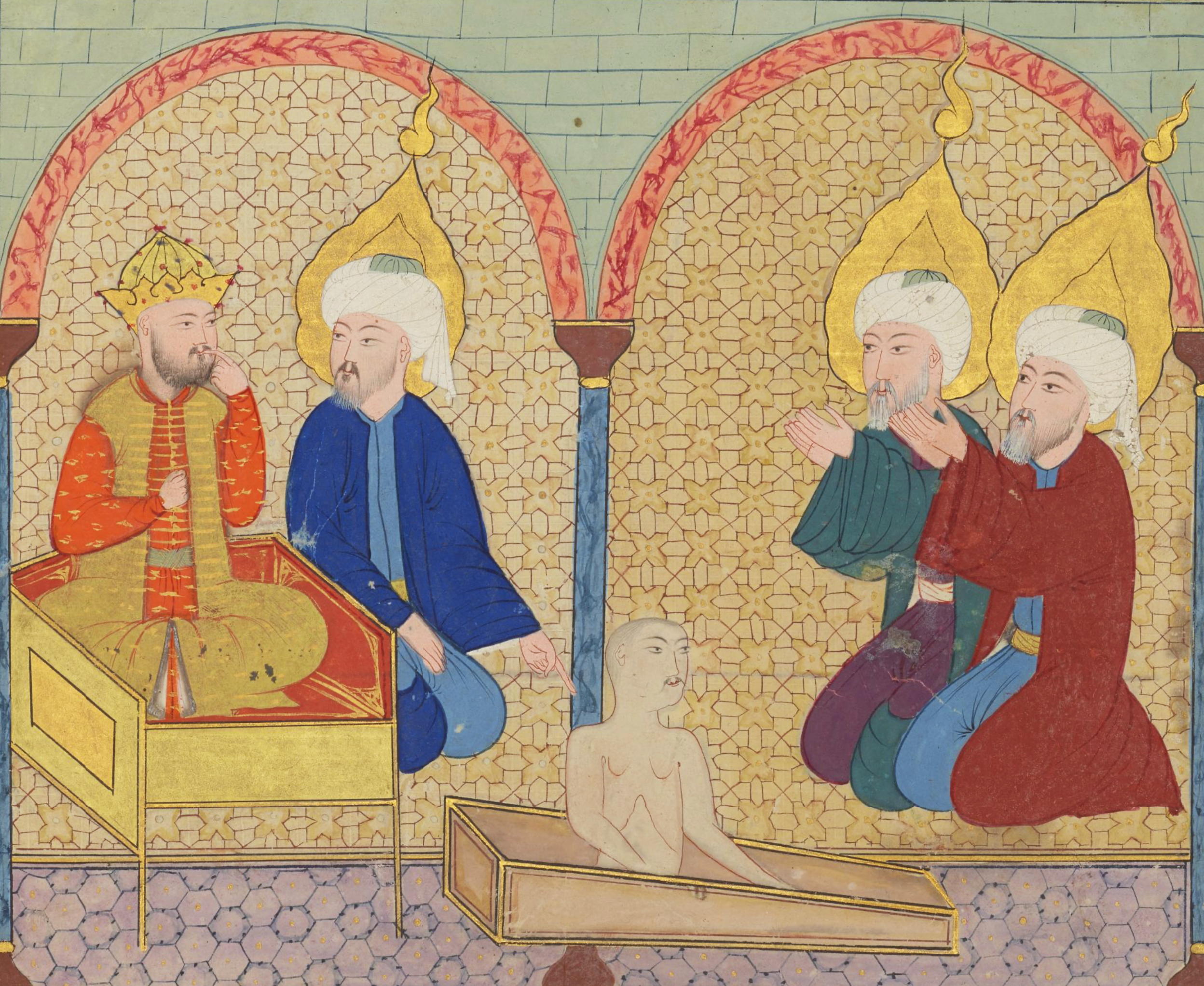
1585-1590 Islamic manuscript depicting prophets and disciples of Isa visiting the ruler of the people of Ya-Sin. Two of them Sadiq and Saduq (John and Paul) raise a dead man to convince him of the Gospel. Next to the king sits Shalum (Simon-Peter) pointing at the miracle.

People of Ya-Sin or Ashab al-Qarya (Arabic: أصحاب القرية) is the phrase used by Muslims to refer to an ancient community that is mentioned in the 36th surah of the Quran as the People of the City or the Companions of the City. The location and people of this city has been the subject of much scholarly debate in Islam.

== In the Quran ==
According to the Quran, God sent two prophets to this particular community. When the people of the city refused to hear their words, God sent a third prophet to strengthen them. The prophets told the people: "Truly we have been sent on a mission to you". The community mocked the message of the prophets and said “You are only humans like us, and the Most Compassionate has not revealed anything. You are simply lying!” The prophets, in reply, rebuked the community, saying: "Our Lord doth know that we have been sent on a mission to you: "And our duty is only to proclaim the clear Message."

The Quran goes on to say that the prophets were threatened with stoning and torture, but they refused to give in and continued to warn the people to end their sinful ways. Then, from the farthest part of the city, there came running a man who exhorted the people to believe the message and told them: "O my people! Obey the messengers: "Obey those who ask no reward of you (for themselves), and who have themselves received Guidance. The following verses, which describe the man's entrance in to "the garden" (Jannah), which refers to Heaven, has been interpreted by some scholars to mean that the believing man was martyred for his faith.

== Accounts in exegesis ==
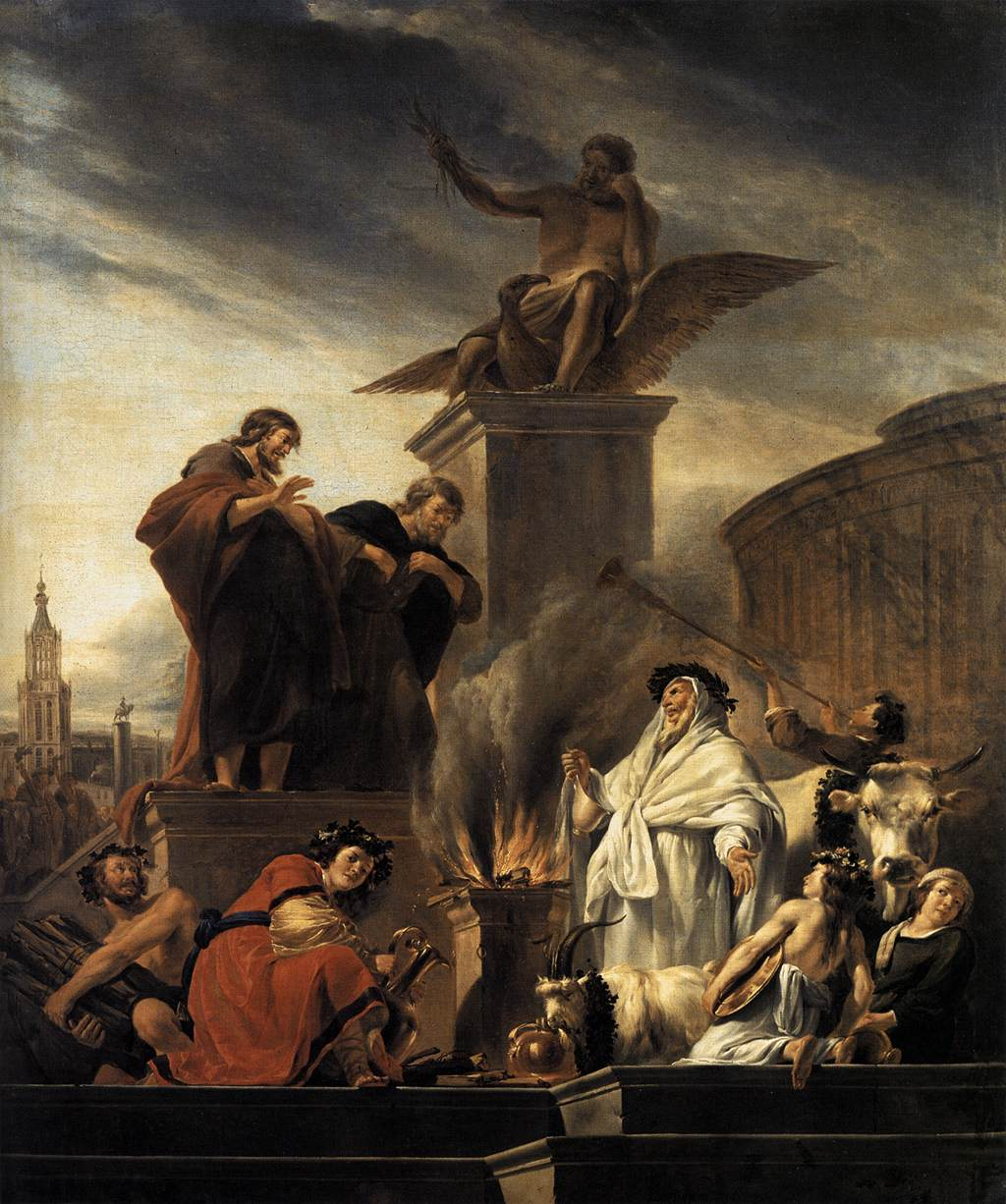
Nicolaes Pieterszoon Berchem's depiction of Paul and Barnabas at Lystra, an incident which has often been compared to the Qur'anic narrative of the "Companions of the City"

Classical commentators on the Quran popularly identified the "People of the City" with the city of Antioch. Those scholars who identified the city with Antioch, however, were divided over the date of the event. One group believed that this event took place after Jesus and explained that the Quran's use of the word "Messenger" in this context refers not to three prophets but to three of Jesus's disciples who were sent to Antioch to proclaim the message. The name of this martyr is not explicitly mentioned anywhere in Qur'an or Hadith, though he is known as The Believer of Ya Sin. Ibn Kathir in his Tafsir (Commentary) on Quran 36 references a narration that identifies the three disciples sent were Sham'un (Simon Peter), Yuhanna (John) and the name of the third was Bulus (Paul). Other commentators who believe that the city does refer to Antioch explained that this is the narrative of a far older incident, and that the three "messengers" mentioned were indeed prophets, namely Saduq, Masduq and Shalum.

Abdullah Yusuf Ali did link the narrative of the story with the preaching of Paul and Barnabas as described in Acts of the Apostles. As with Antioch, the city of Jerusalem is also not directly mentioned by name in the Qur'an.

== See also ==
- Acts 13:4–5
- Acts 14:1–5, 8–13
