= Silpium =

Ancient mountain above Antioch on the Orontes

Coordinates: 36.1993°N 36.1789°E

Silpium (Ancient Greek: Σίλπιον όρος) is the ancient mountain above Antioch on the Orontes (modern Antakya, Turkey) where Io, the daughter of Inachus, dies of grief in the version of the Greek myth preserved by the Syrian historian Ioannis Malalas (2.30). In modern Turkish, it is called Habib-i Neccar Dağı.
