= Judgment of Paris (disambiguation) =

The Judgment of Paris is a story in Greek mythology related to the Trojan War.

Judgment of Paris may also refer to:

== Art ==
- Judgement of Paris (mosaic), a mosaic from the early second century AD discovered in Antioch
- Judgement of Paris Amphora, an Attic black-figure amphora
- The Judgement of Paris (Boucher), a painting by François Boucher
- The Judgment of Paris (Rubens), several paintings by Peter Paul Rubens
- El Juicio de Paris (Simonet), a painting by Enrique Simonet
- The Judgement of Paris (Hynais)
- The Judgment of Paris (Etty), an 1826 painting by William Etty

== Literature ==
- "The Judgement of Paris", a poem by James Beattie
- The Judgment of Paris, a novel by Gore Vidal
- The Judgment of Paris: The Revolutionary Decade That Gave the World Impressionism by Ross King

== Other uses ==
- The Judgment of Paris (opera), an opera libretto by William Congreve, set to music by five British Baroque composers
- Judgment of Paris (wine), a 1976 wine tasting event that increased the visibility of American and California wines
