= 4th-century Roman domes =

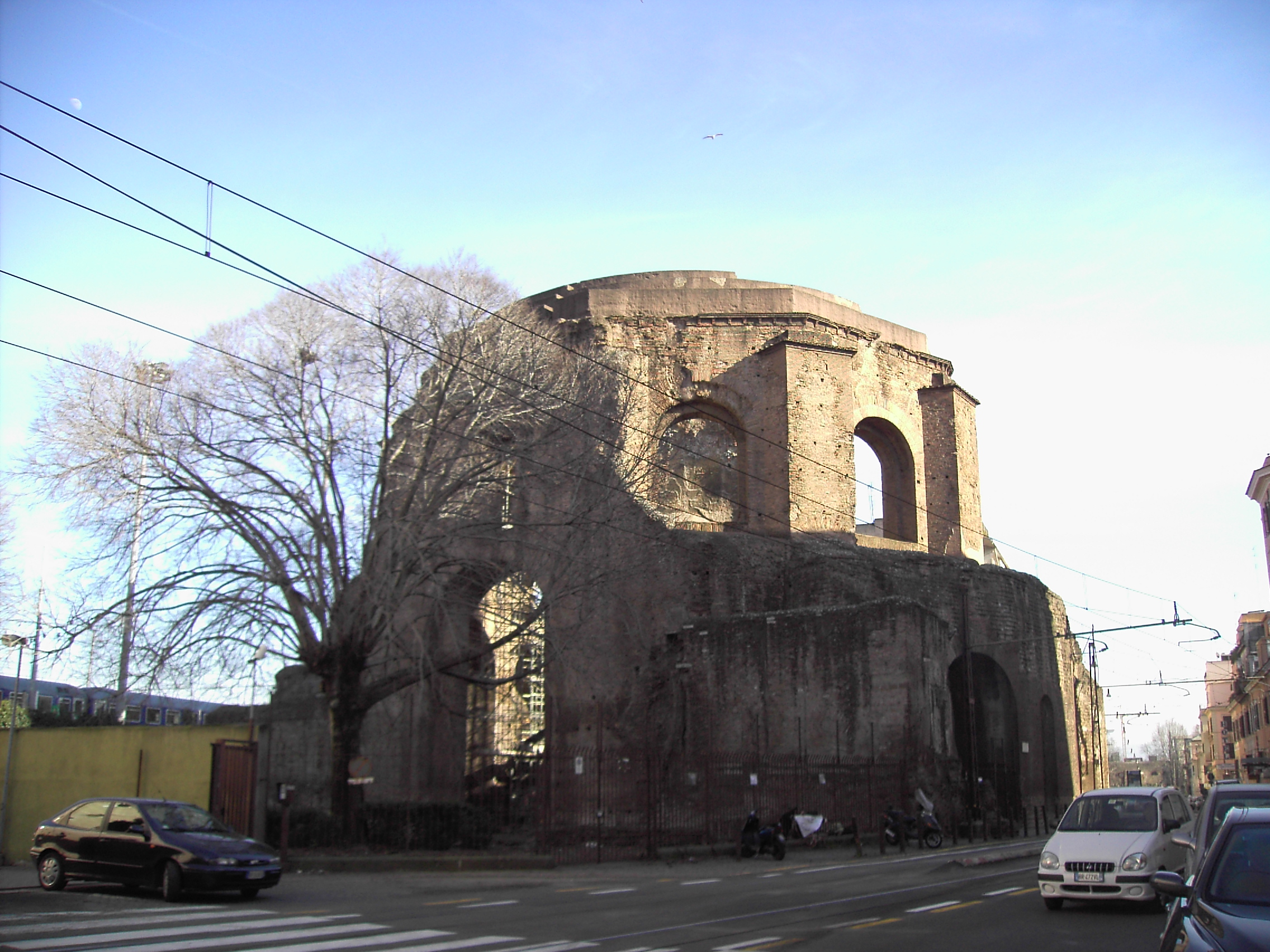
The so-called "Temple of Minerva Medica" in Rome

In the 4th century, Roman domes proliferated due to changes in the way domes were constructed, including advances in centering techniques and the use of brick ribbing. The so-called "Temple of Minerva Medica", for example, used brick ribs along with step-rings and lightweight pumice aggregate concrete to form a decagonal dome. The material of choice in construction gradually transitioned during the 4th and 5th centuries from stone or concrete to lighter brick in thin shells. The use of ribs stiffened the structure, allowing domes to be thinner with less massive supporting walls. Windows were often used in these walls and replaced the oculus as a source of light, although buttressing was sometimes necessary to compensate for large openings. The Mausoleum of Santa Costanza has windows beneath the dome and nothing but paired columns beneath that, using a surrounding barrel vault to buttress the structure.

Domes made with ceramic vaulting tubes that have been dated to the 4th century include a 3rd-4th century bath at Valesio, 3rd-4th century bath villa at Curinga, 4th-5th century bath villa under the Church of St. Peter in Pava (Siena), and 4th century bath villa at La Befa (Siena).

== Diocletian ==
The Mausoleum of Diocletian uses small arched squinches of brick built up from a circular base in an overlapping scales pattern, called a "stepped squinches dome". The scales pattern was a popular Hellenistic motif adopted by the Parthians and Sasanians, and such domes are likely related to Persian "squinch vaults". The inner diameter of the building is 13.35 meters. The only light source in the building is a single window just below the dome that was added in the 17th century. Deformations at the top of the dome indicate possible modification, supporting speculation that there may have originally been an oculus. Radial iron anchors from the Roman era were discovered in the dome during a restoration. A lower crypt chamber is also domed. The mausoleum was built in 305 within the imperial palace.

In addition to the mausoleum, the Palace of Diocletian also contains a rotunda near the center of the complex that may have served as a throne room. It has side niches similar to those of an octagonal mausoleum but was located at the end of an apparently barrel-vaulted hall like the arrangement found in later Sasanian palaces.

== Galerius ==
The Rotunda of Galerius, with its 24-meter (79 ft) dome, was built close to the imperial palace around 300 AD as either a mausoleum or a throne room. It was converted into a church in the 5th century. The dome appears to have originally been built with sixteen lunette windows at its base, eight of which were filled in prior to the placement of the surviving dome mosaics. The remaining lunette windows have since been reduced to small square windows. The east end of the building was reconstructed in the 11th century and an additional lunette window was added at that time on that side, along with reconstruction of the two adjacent lunettes. Also in Thessaloniki, at the Tetrarchic palace, an octagonal building has been excavated with a 24.95 meter span that may have been used as a throne room. It is known not to have been used as a church and was unsuitable as a mausoleum, and was used for some period between about 311 and when it was destroyed before about 450. Remains of two mausolea at Gamzigrad are believed to have been domed and used as the resting places of Galerius and his mother Romula. The mausoleum of Galerius seems to have been similar to that of Diocletian and may have used it as a model.

A Tetrarchic imperial mausoleum has been excavated at Šarkamen, with a brick domed lower chamber preserved, and its similarity to the Gamzigrad mausolea has led to speculation that the same architect designed it. It may have been built for the mother of Maximinus Daza.

The Palace of Galerius at Thessalonica included two centrally planned halls. One is known only from foundations but had a diameter of 29 meters and was located within a courtyard north of the imperial apartments. Another hall, called the Octagon, may have been an audience hall or throne room. Construction began under Galerius and continued under Constantine when he resided at the city. It had a monumental vestibule and was located closer to the waterfront, perhaps to receive visitors arriving by sea. It later became a church, possibly in the second half of the 5th century.

== Constantine ==
The Mausoleum of Helena (c. 315–327) was the first imperial mausoleum for a Christian, Constantine's mother, and was attached to the Basilica of Saints Marcellinus and Petrus. The inside of the rotunda was a single well-lit space 20.18 meters in diameter with no lower chamber. The drum had eight windows set in exterior niches and there is no evidence of an oculus in the ceiling. The dome was constructed with hollow jars called pignatte and it was decorated with mosaics. The mausoleum is believed to have been built by Constantine as his own tomb before his decision to move the capital changed those plans. A description by Eusebius mentions a dōmation on the roof enclosed by bronze grills. Although unclear what this was, it has been translated as a "little house" that may have been a central domed turret or drum.

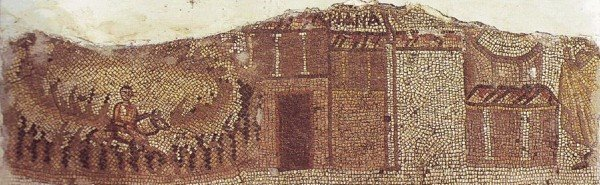
The Megalopsychia mosaic with a possible image of Constantine's Domus Aurea on the right side

The octagonal "Domus Aurea", or "Golden Octagon", built by Emperor Constantine in 327 at the imperial palace of Antioch likewise had a domical roof, presumably of wood and covered with gilded lead. Also called "the Octagon" or "Great Church", the central octagonal domed space was apparently surrounded by a two-story ambulatory with columns in a similar billowing pattern to the later church of San Lorenzo in Milan. It was dedicated two years after the Council of Nicea to "Harmony, the divine power that unites Universe, Church, and Empire". It may have been both the cathedral of Antioch as well as the court church of Constantine, and the precedent for the later octagonal plan churches near palaces of Saints Sergius and Bacchus and Hagia Sophia by Justinian and Aachen Cathedral by Charlemagne. The building may be depicted in the mid-5th century Megalopsychia mosaic found near Antioch. It appears to show a church with a columned peristyle lower level with an octagonal upper story and a white dome. The dome was rebuilt by 537–8 with cypress wood from Daphne after being destroyed in a fire. Most domes on churches in the Syrian region were built of wood, like that of the later Dome of the Rock in Jerusalem, and the dome of the Domus Aurea survived a series of earthquakes in the 6th century that destroyed the rest of the building. There is no record of the church being rebuilt after the earthquake of 588, perhaps due to the general abandonment of many public buildings in what was no longer a capital of the Empire.

Constantine built the Church of the Nativity in Bethlehem around 333 as a large basilica with an octagonal structure at the eastern end, over the cave said to be the birthplace of Jesus. The domed octagon had an external diameter of 18 meters. It was later destroyed and when rebuilt by Justinian in 529 the octagon was replaced with a tri-apsidal structure.

Centralized buildings of circular or octagonal plan also became used for baptistries and reliquaries due to the suitability of those shapes for assembly around a single object. Baptisteries began to be built in the manner of domed mausolea during the 4th century in Italy. The octagonal Lateran Baptistery or the baptistery of the Holy Sepulchre may have been the first, and the style spread during the 5th century. The dome of the Lateran Baptistery was replaced in the seventeenth century. In the second half of the fourth century, domed octagonal baptisteries similar to the form of contemporary imperial mausolea developed in the region of North Italy near Milan. Examples of domed baptisteries include the Baptistery of San Giovanni in Fonte in Milan (late 4th century), a baptistery in Aquileia (late 4th century), and a domed baptistery in Naples (4th to 6th centuries).

Part of a baths complex begun in the early 4th century, the brick Church of St. George in Sofia was a caldarium that was converted in the middle of the fifth century. It is a rotunda with four apse niches in the corners. The best preserved example of Roman architecture in the city, it has been used as a baptistery, church, mosque, and mausoleum over the centuries. The dome rises to about 14 m from the floor with a diameter of about 9.5 m. Its original function as a hypocaust hall is disputed and, based on its form, the building may originally have been a Christian martyrium. It was half-destroyed by the Huns in 447 and was rebuilt in the 11th century.

In the middle of the 4th century in Rome, domes were built as part of the Baths of Constantine and the Baths of Helena. Domes over the calderia, or hot rooms, of the older Baths of Agrippa and the Baths of Caracalla were also rebuilt at this time. The Baths of Agrippa included a 4th-century lattice-ribbed dome about 23.9 meters in diameter as the frigidarium, or cold room, typically the largest room in a bath complex. It is unclear whether this reconstructed an earlier dome.

Between the second half of the 4th century and the middle of the 5th century, domed mausolea for wealthy families were built attached to a new type of martyrial basilica before burials within the basilica itself, closer to the martyr's remains, made such attached buildings obsolete. A pagan rotunda from this period located on the Via Sacra was later incorporated into the Basilica of Saints Cosmas and Damian as a vestibule around 526. The chapel of S. Satiro in Milan was built with a dome using the pottery technique of Ravenna, and was later connected to the Basilica of Sant'Ambrogio.

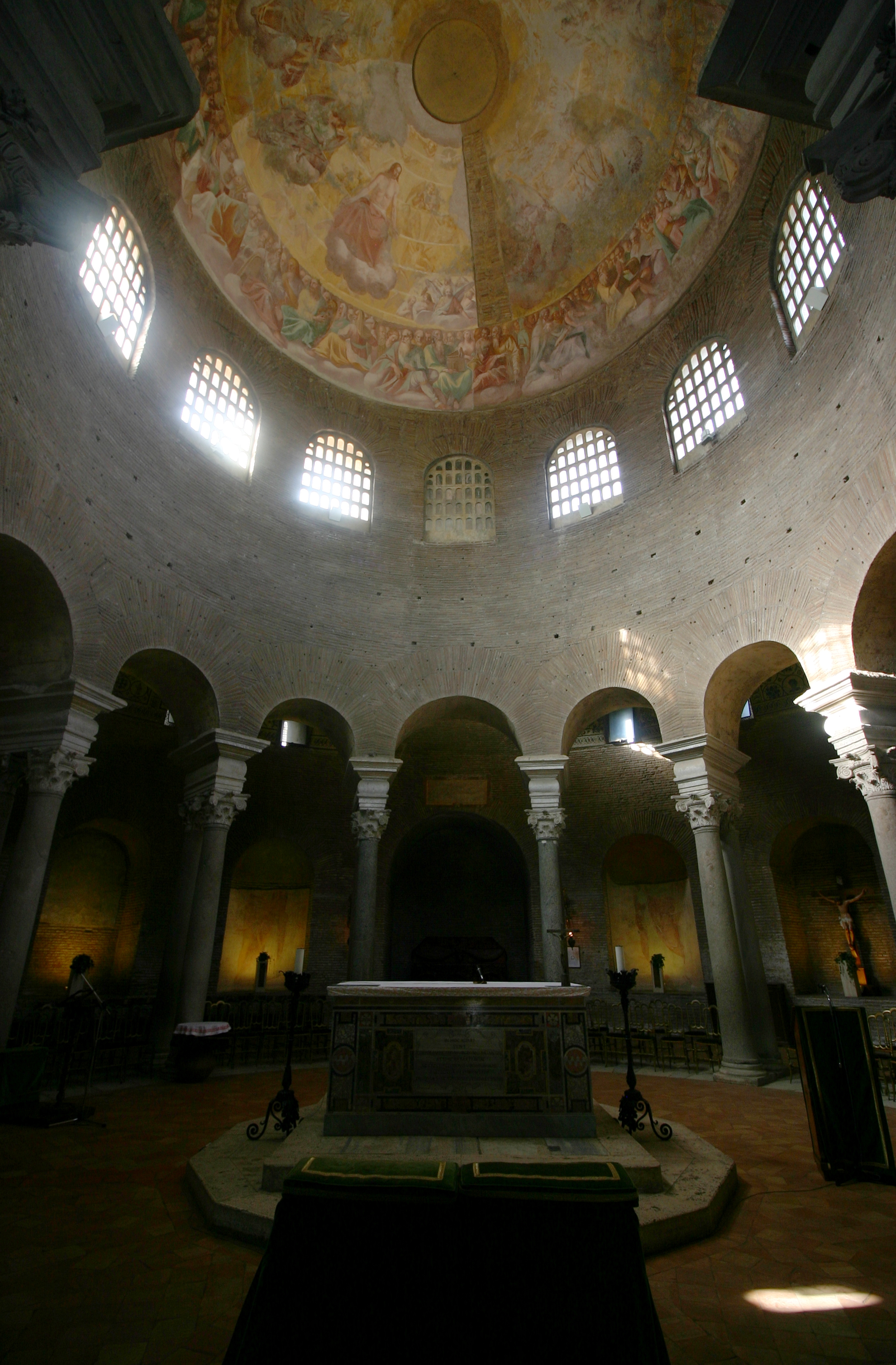
The Mausoleum of Santa Costanza

The Mausoleum of Santa Costanza was built attached to the south wall of the cemetery basilica of St. Agnes and consists of an 11.5 meter wide dome supported by twelve pairs of columns and a surrounding vaulted ambulatory. The dome's mosaic has not survived but its design was recorded in drawings showing that it combined pagan and Christian elements, indicating a date of completion in the middle of the fourth century. Descriptions, paintings, and drawings of the dome mosaics from the 16th and 17th centuries, before its destruction in 1620, indicate that they included scenes from both the Old and New Testaments. The dome included eight brick ribs in its structure and was lit by 12 windows in the drum, above the columns. The paired ribs were made of bipedale bricks and a light concrete of tufa and pumice were between them. Although the dome did not have an oculus, a circular recess at the apex seems to have originally had an egg-and-dart frame and an umbrella-pattern mosaic as a kind of false oculus. The building may originally have been intended to house the remains of Constantine.

Centrally planned halls were rare in private villas, but the Roman villa of Centcelles in Hispania Tarraconensis included two square rooms with round plan interiors, one of which has a partially surviving dome mosaic. The exterior dimensions of the room with the dome mosaic are 15.24 by 15.24 meters. The domed room has a lower chamber that may have served as the mausoleum of Emperor Constans, who died in the Pyrenees in 350. The adjacent tetraconch room was never roofed.

== Constantius II ==
Christian mausolea and shrines developed into the "centralized church" type, often with a dome over a raised central space. The Church of the Holy Apostles, or Apostoleion, probably planned by Constantine but built by his successor Constantius in the new capital city of Constantinople, combined the congregational basilica with the centralized shrine. It may have had a similar plan to that of the Church of Saint Simeon Stylites, with four naves projected from a central rotunda containing Constantine's tomb and spaces for the tombs of the twelve Apostles. Above the center may have been a clerestory with a wooden dome roofed with bronze sheeting and gold accents. There are different interpretations of the description of Constantine's mausoleum and its relation to the cruciform Church of the Holy Apostles, but it may have been built as a domed rotunda to which Constantius later added a cruciform basilica.

In Carthage, the main room of the Kobbat Bent el Rey (320-340) featured a complex vaulting system formed by partial spherical sail vault sections made of terracotta vaulting tubes. The rectangular space was 3.75 meters wide. This technique of creating complex vaults made of partial sail vaults was unique to North Africa and likely due to the use of vaulting tubes in place of timber centering as forests were converted to olive tree cultivation in Tunisia.

The Church of the Holy Sepulchre in Jerusalem was likely built with a wooden dome over the shrine by the end of the 4th century. It may have had a stone dome. The building may have been planned under Constantine as early as 326 and under construction before his death. It may have been in use around 350. The earliest evidence for a building enclosing the tomb comes from a mention in the Catecheses of Cyril of Jerusalem, dated to between 348 and 350, and the eyewitness testimony by Egeria from between 381 and 384. The tomb previously stood as a simple mausoleum in an open courtyard surrounded by columns. The rotunda built around it was initially a standalone structure built later than the nearby basilica. Because Jerusalem was subject to the Patriarchate of Antioch, the double-shell design for the building may have been influenced by the central-plan double-shell design of the Great Church of Antioch.

The outer rotunda was 33.7 meters (111 ft) in diameter, including an ambulatory around a domed center room containing the tomb of Christ. The central space was defined by a ring of columns in four sets of three, between which were three pairs of piers and the entrance. The space was not perfectly circular due to an intersecting straight wall on the eastern side, but it was about 19.5 meters in diameter. The dome was about 21 meters (69 ft) wide. The dome rose over a ground floor, gallery, and clerestory and may have had an oculus. The existence of a gallery level in the original building is possible but not definitively established. Ampullae from the 6th and 7th centuries found at Monza show a clerestory on the building at that time. Razed to the ground in 1009 by the Fatimid Caliph, it was rebuilt in 1048 by Emperor Constantine IX Monomachos, reportedly with a mosaic depicting Christ and the Twelve Apostles. The current dome is a 1977 renovation in thin reinforced concrete.

== Julian ==
The oblong decagon of today's St. Gereon's Basilica in Cologne, Germany, was built upon an extraordinary and richly decorated 4th century Roman building that had an apse, semi-domed niches, and dome. A church built in the city's northern cemetery, its original dedication is unknown. It may have been built by Julianus, the governor of Gaul from 355 to 360 who would later become emperor, as a mausoleum for his family. The oval space may have been patterned after imperial audience halls or buildings such as the Temple of Minerva Medica.

Fluted or coffered domed structures appear in art with greater frequency from the late 4th century.

== Gratian ==
A small building excavated near the imperial palace in Ravenna and proposed to be a mausoleum to a 4th century bishop named Liberius (circa AD 377) included a dome made from ceramic vaulting tubes. It is the earliest building with evidence of the use of ceramic vaulting tubes in Ravenna.

== Theodosius I ==
The early church of St. John at Ephesus mentioned in a late fourth century account by Etheria appears to have been a timber-roofed cruciform building with arms of roughly equal length and four central piers, each about 3.5 meters by 3.5 meters in section, supporting a crossing dome.

Emperor Theodosius completed an octagonal domed church dedicated to John the Baptist in the Hebdomon suburb of Constantinople around 392. It contained the relic of the head of John the Baptist and served as a coronation site for a series of emperors. The remains were destroyed in 1965 and the exact layout is not known, but it may have been a double-shell octagon similar to the Basilica of San Vitale in Ravenna. Another double-shell building in Constantinople is indicated by subterranean remains of a centralized building with ambulatory and projecting apse dated to about 400 or earlier. It may have been the martyrium of Saints Karpus and Papylus.

Near the Villa of Carranque is a complex believed to be the mausoleum for Theodosius I's Christian praetorian prefect, Maternus Cyngeius. It included a 20-by-17 meter central-plan hall with a central dome and four side domes built with pitched brick. Also part of the complex was a tetraconch building, which may have been a slightly later addition.

The so-called baptistery of Santa Severina in Calabria, southern Italy, was built sometime between the 4th and 11th centuries.

== See also ==
- List of Roman domes
- History of architecture
