= Antioch mosaics =

Grouping of ancient mosaic floors

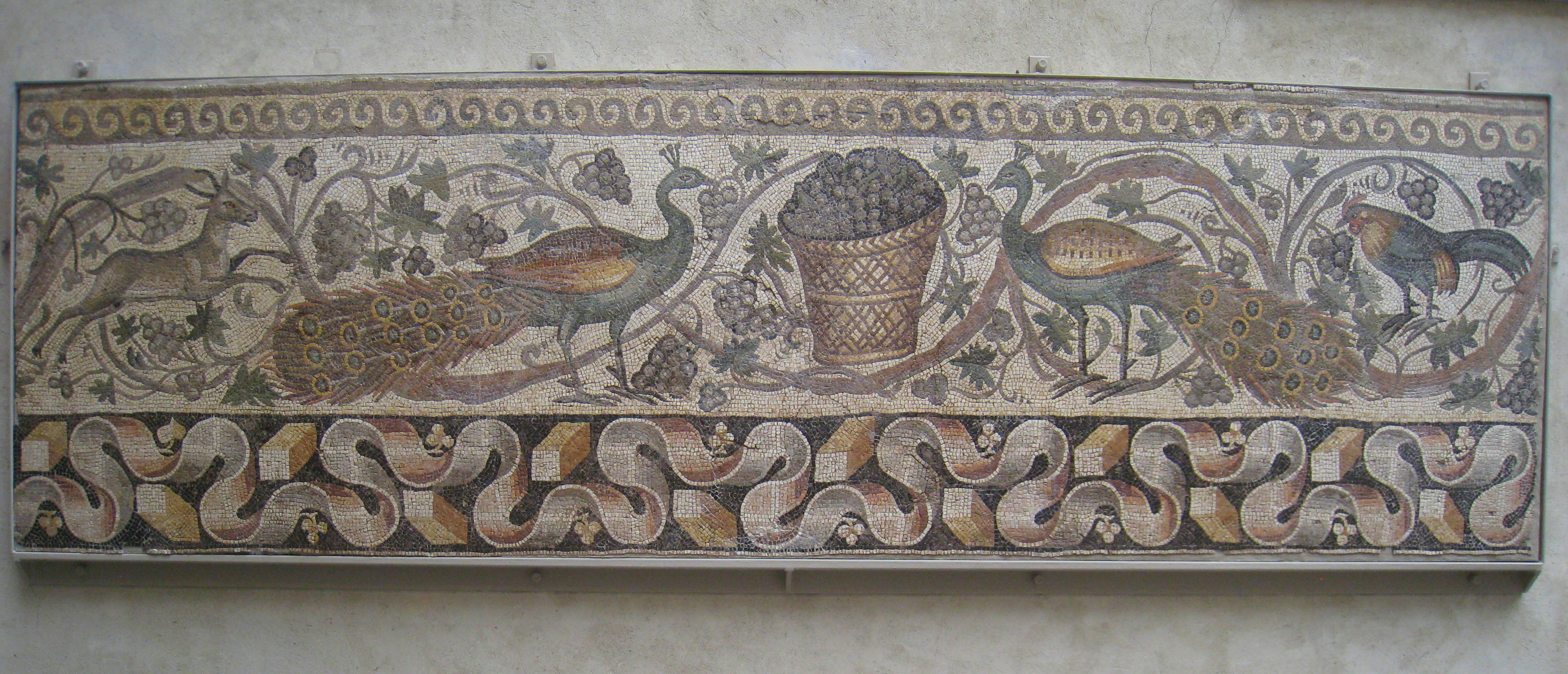
One of the Antioch mosaics in Worcester Art Museum

The Antioch mosaics are a grouping of over 300 mosaic floors created around the 3rd century AD, and discovered during archaeological excavations of Antioch (Antioch on the Orontes, in modern Turkey) between 1932 and 1939 by a consortium of five museums and institutions. About half of the mosaics are now in the Hatay Archaeology Museum in Antakya, with the rest in the Worcester Art Museum, Museum of Fine Arts, Boston, Baltimore Museum of Art, Harvard University and Princeton University Art Museum among others. The mosaics range in design from realistic imagery and scenes to purely geometric patterns.

== History ==
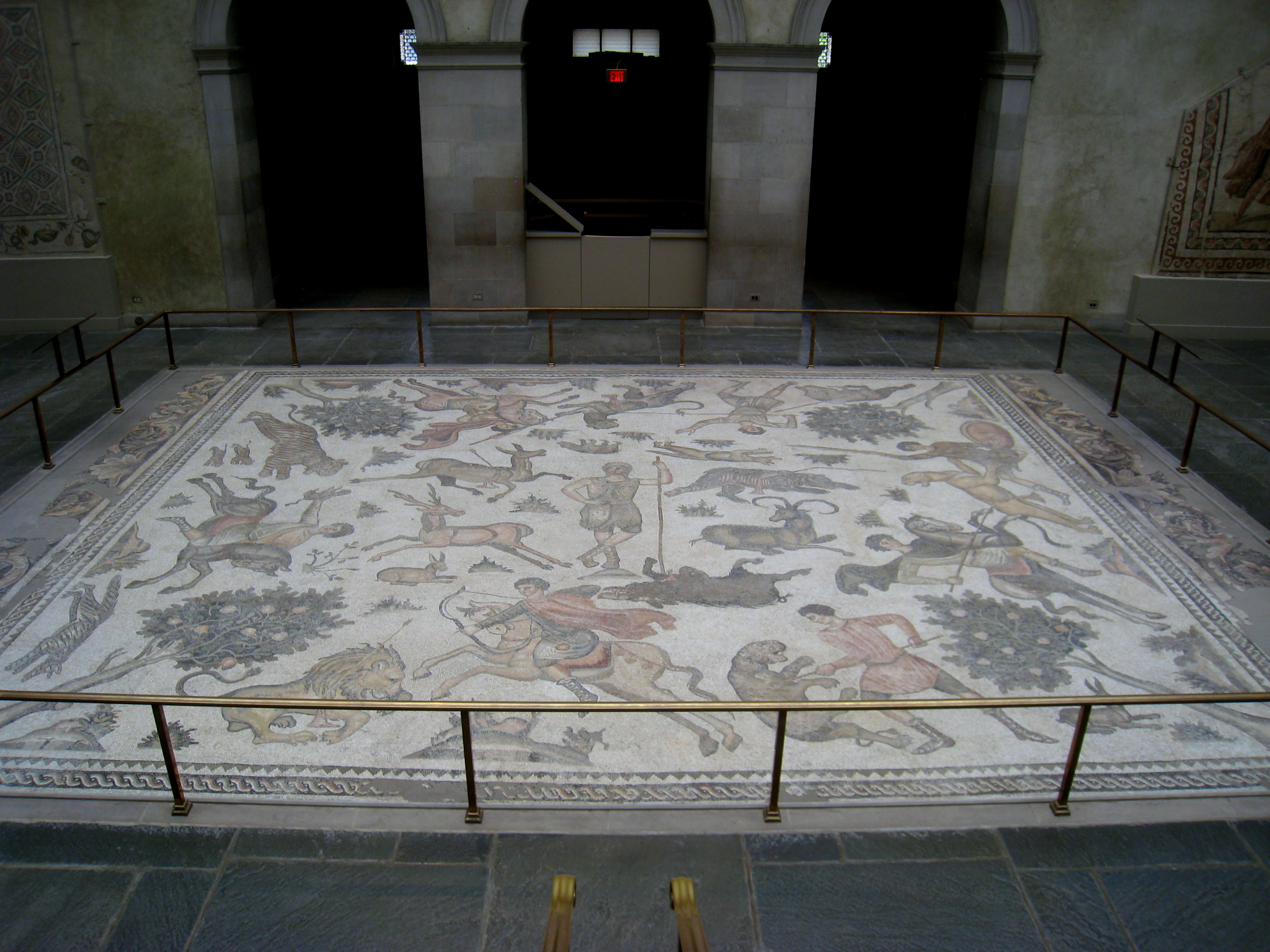
The Worcester Hunt, in Worcester Art Museum, is the largest Antioch Mosaic in the United States.

Antioch was an ancient city located just outside the modern day city of Antakya, Turkey. Hellenistic art began to influence mosaic art in the city from the time of Alexander the Great and the Hellenistic Seleucid Empire, with Ancient Antioch serving as capital during some periods. Roman mosaic art took on a common symbolic form with minor regional variations throughout many cities and palaces in the empire. During the reign of Hadrian, during the 2nd century, through to the reign of Justinian in the 6th century, mosaic floors were the fashion in the city and its surrounding suburbs. Antioch served as a regional capitol for periods of the Tetrarchy and was home to many wealthy patrons of art. The city thrived until it was destroyed by earthquakes in 526 and 528.

Beginning in 1932, a consortium of museums and institutions sponsored expeditions to the archaeological sites where the city of Antioch once stood. These museums, the Worcester Art Museum, Princeton University, the musée du Louvre, the Baltimore Museum of Art, and Harvard University's affiliate Dumbarton Oaks, were attempting to uncover great monuments, palaces, and treasures, but were disappointed when most of what was unearthed, under tons of silt, was just the remains of houses, most without any remaining walls. The only surviving part of the majority of the houses was the floors.

The floors the archaeologists discovered were covered in intricate mosaics. More than 300 mosaics were found.

In 1939 the expedition ended and the archaeologists packed up to leave. They left about half of the unearthed mosaics to the city of Antakya, the modern day city located at Antioch, which subsequently built a museum, the Antakya Archaeological Museum, to house them. The rest of the mosaics were split up amongst the institutions that took part in the dig, and were sent all over the world. To be transported, large amounts of concrete was poured behind the mosaics to create a stable backing. When dividing up the floors, the archeologists, often took apart rooms and sent different parts of the floor to different museums. For an exhibit at the Worcester Art Museum in 2000, mosaics were compiled from Paris, Baltimore, Princeton and Wellesley, to reassemble a single room's floor. After the expedition left, the pits were filled back in and olive groves were planted over them.

== Art ==
The Antioch mosaics were created at a time and place between distinct artistic styles. They show the link between artistic styles of ancient Greece and Rome, and the art of early Christianity. The mosaics are incredibly large, with "The Worcester Hunt," the largest Antioch mosaic in the United States, measuring 20.5 feet (6.26 m) x 23.3 feet (7.11 m). The mosaics range in design from realistic imagery and scenes, to purely geometric patterns. It is believed that the mosaics were created by mosaic specialists.

The tesserae for the mosaics include both white and colored marble as well as white and colored limestone.

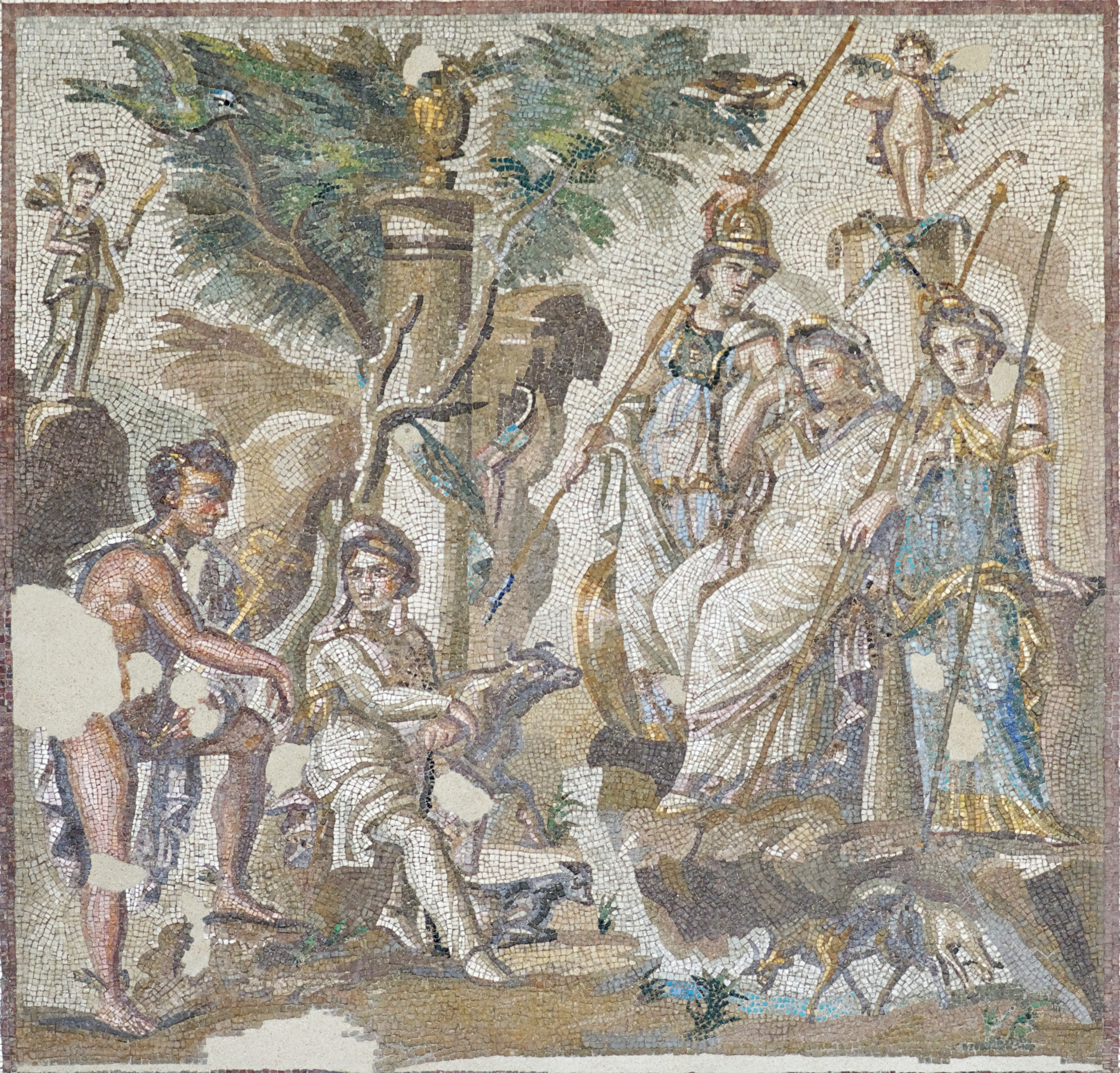
Realistic scene, The Judgement of Paris Louvre Museum

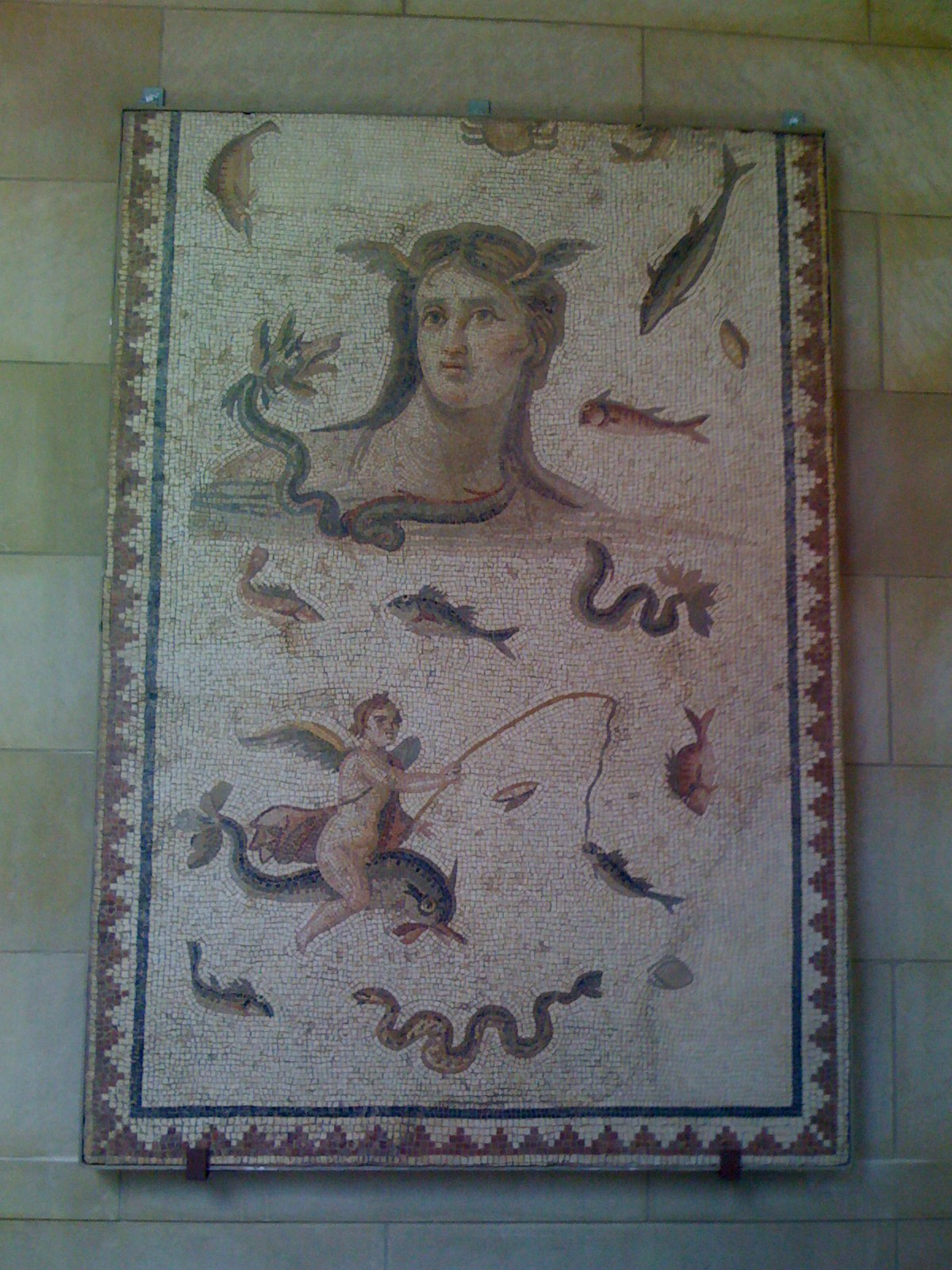
Realistic Imagery, Bust of Tethys Baltimore Museum of Art

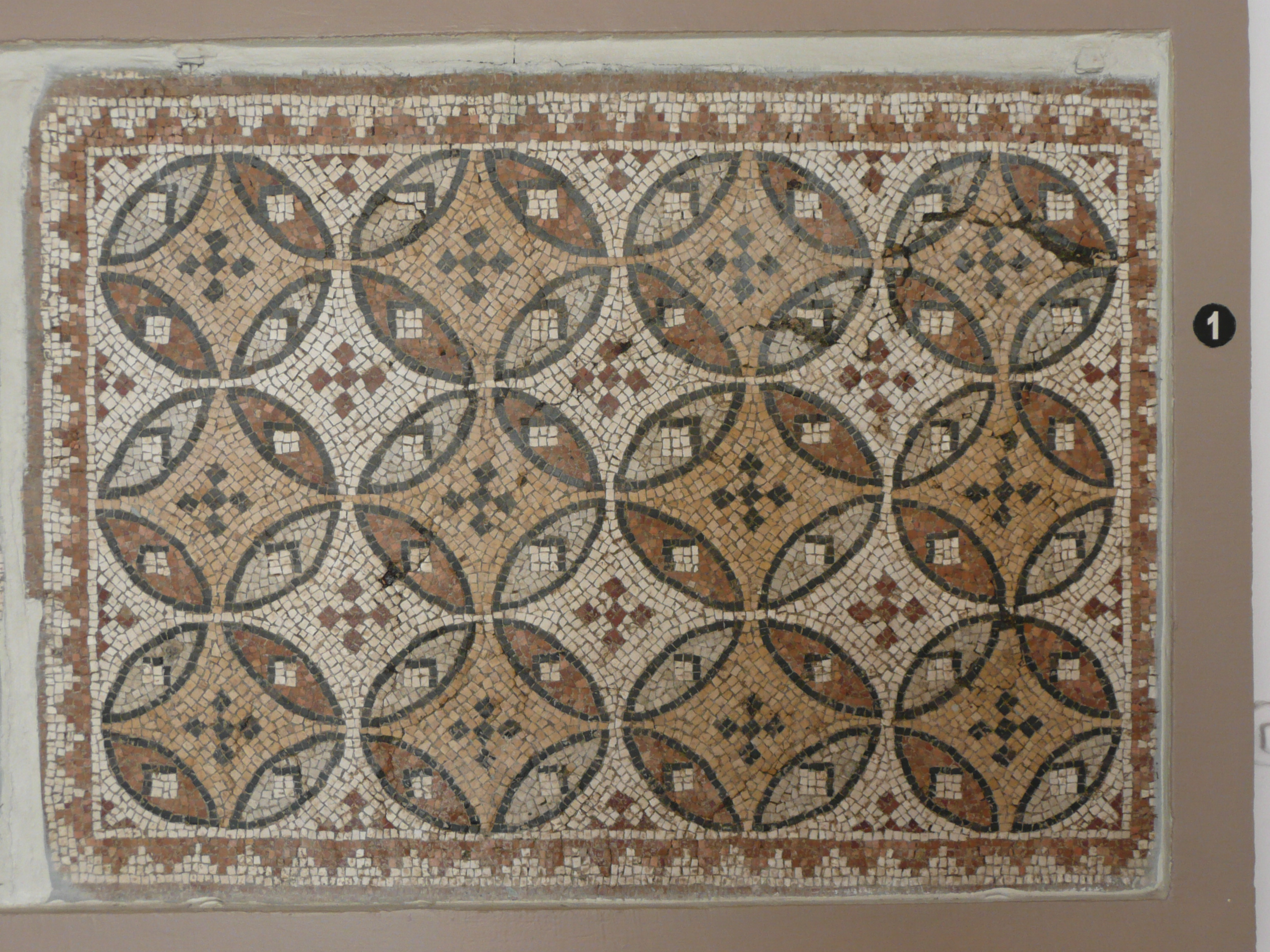
Geometric pattern, Antakya Archaeological Museum

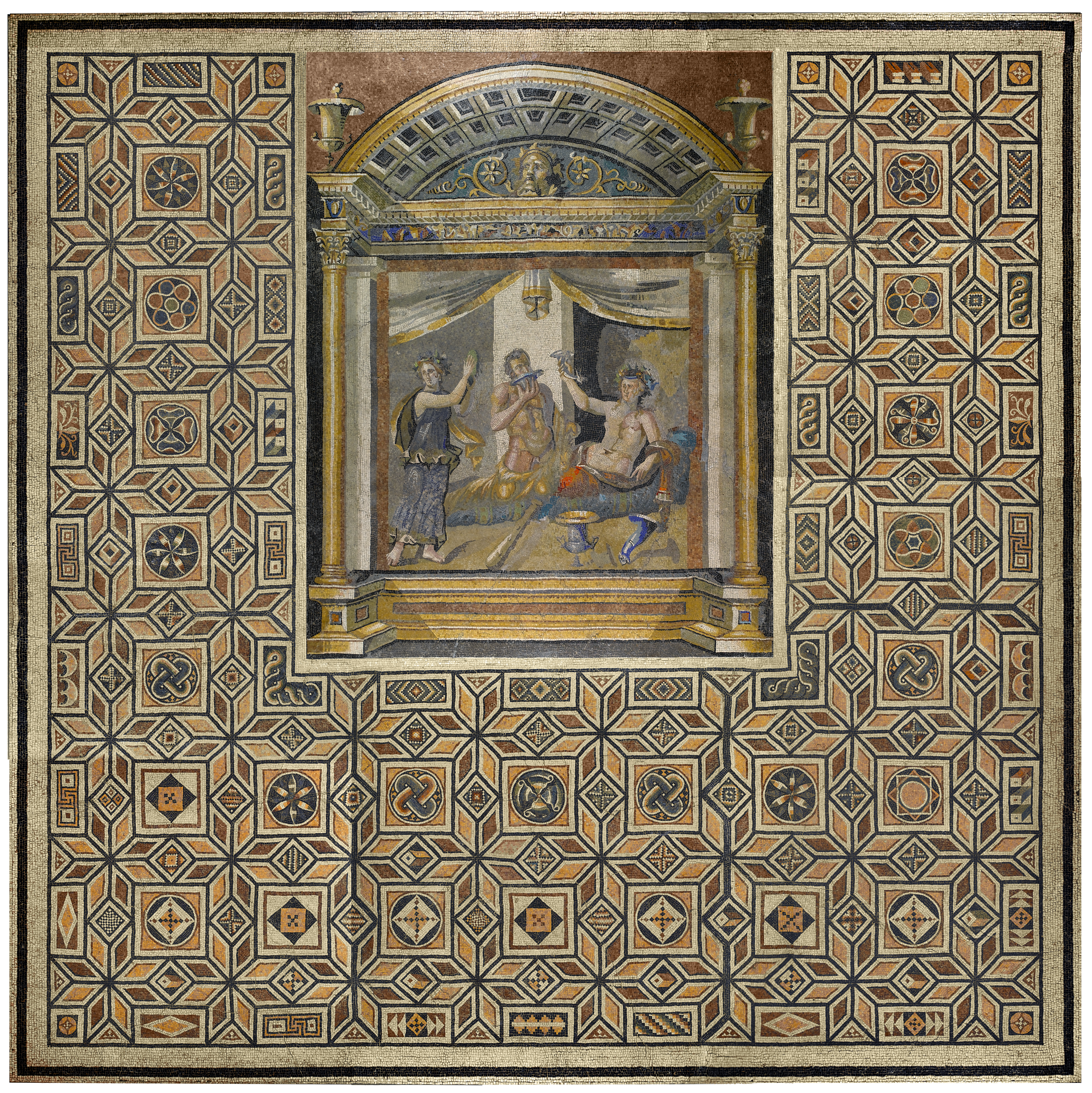
Mosaic pavement: drinking contest of Herakles and Dionysos, Princeton University Art Museum

== See also ==
- Megalopsychia Hunt of Antioch mosaics
- Worcester Hunt Mosaic
- Judgement of Paris (mosaic)
- Hatay Archaeology Museum
- Princeton University Art Museum
- Early Byzantine mosaics in the Middle East
