= Bemarchius =

4th-century Hellenistic sophist

Bemarchius (Ancient Greek: Βημάρχιος) was a pagan Hellene sophist and rhetorician of the Eastern Roman Empire, who lived in or shortly after the time of the Roman emperor Constantine the Great, in the 4th century CE. He was from Caesareia in Cappadocia, and evidently later moved to Constantinople, where he resided as the regime's imperially funded sophist.

== Constantine dynasty ==
Bemarchius was in some ways a mouthpiece for Constantine's successor and son, the emperor Constantius II, and wrote to promote Constantius's connection to the city of Constantinople and his dynastic connection to the reign of his father. Bemarchius was dispatched, or departed of his own volition, on a speaking tour of the eastern Mediterranean -- notably through Egypt -- to offer propagandistic panegyrics in praise of some building project that had been accomplished by the dynasty. Which building exactly he was praising has been the subject of scholarly debate, with the traditional view being that it was the Domus Aurea, and some more modern scholars have suggested it was the Church of the Holy Apostles, both of which had been completed under Constantius.

He wrote a history of Constantine, The Acts of Constantine, in ten books, some time around the 340s CE. He also wrote declamations and various orations. None of his works have survived to the present day.

== Feud with Libanius ==
Much of what we know about him comes from an unflattering portrait in the writings of the 4th-century sophist Libanius, who was the subject of a bitter feud with Bemarchius. According to Libanius, Bemarchius was at the center of a circle of "has been" orators whose friendship was premised on gambling and drinking, and were motivated by commercial showmanship and money, not principles. Libanius also suggests Bemarchius was something of a hypocrite, being -- as Libanius was -- an adherent of the Hellenistic religion while also praising a Christian emperor who had set himself against these older, "pagan" gods.

Bemarchius accused Libanius of witchcraft, claiming that he had been harmed by Libanius's astrological enchantments, and tried to get the governor of Constantinople bring him to trial. Praetors who tried to protect Libanius were overruled and ousted, and the governor advised Libanius to leave Constantinople. Libanius, fearing for his life, fled to Nicomedia, after which he wrote his retaliatory orations against Bemarchius.
