= Jutta Meischner =

German classical archaeologist

Jutta Frieda Luise Meischner
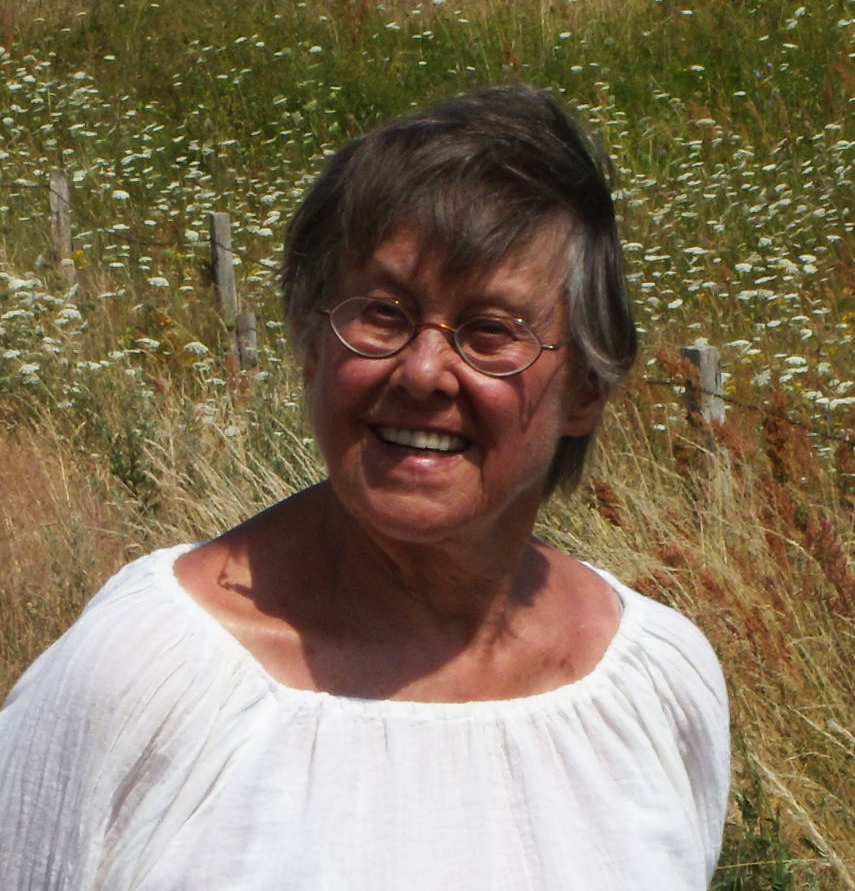
- German Classical Archaeologist
- Born: June 13, 1935 (age 90); Danzig, Free City of Danzig
- Occupations: ASET Trustee and Academic Director, Emerita Contributor, ret. (Referentin i. R.), German Archaeological Institute (Deutsches Archäologisches Institut)
- Parent(s): Herbert (Baurat - member of the Danzig Board of Works) and Lilly Meischner

Jutta Frieda Luise Meischner (born 1935, in Danzig) is a German archeologist with specialities in philology, classical archaeology, ancient history with a doctorate on Classical Archaeology. In 1964, she started working for the German Archaeological Institute, Berlin.

== Biography ==
The daughter of the civil engineer Herbert Meischner and his wife Lilly, she was born in 1935 in what was then the Free City of Danzig. After fleeing Danzig in January 1945 in the wake of World War II, she attended the Droste-Hülshoff High School in Berlin-Zehlendorf, where she passed her A-levels in 1954. At the Free University of Berlin, she studied classical philology, classical archeology, ancient history and completed studies of Greek and Latin. She spent the academic year 1958/59 at the University of Athens and Greece. The next year was dedicated to the study of Greek and Roman ancient collections of the major museums in order to prepare her dissertation on "The Female Portrait in the Severan Period". After completing her doctorate in 1964, she joined the civil service at the German Archaeological Institute, Berlin, from which she retired after 35 years of service in 2000. During this time she also continued her studies of late antique portraiture, which resulted in a brief monograph entitled "Portraits of Late Antiquity" (bnb-Verlag Bremen, 2001).

In 1988 she was invited by the Archaeological Institute in Warsaw to lecture in Danzig. In 1998, she lectured in Mérida on the great Missorium of Theodosius I which she credited to Theodosius II. Tunisian mosaics inspired her to study the Greek and Roman sports.

Meischner was given responsibility for the publication of the wall paintings of the Late Roman Hypogeum in Constanta, Romania. In Copenhagen, she was able to assign the, up to then, much earlier dated statues of Sette Sale to the Valentinian epoch, based on the design of the eyes. In 1999 she received permission to study and publicize Greek and Roman sculptures from the Hatay Archaeology Museum in Antakya, Turkey. Through the Attic garland sarcophagi was shown the Attic origin of Berlin's early imperial Caffarelli-sarcophagus from Rome. Together with Ergün Laflı from Izmir she again showed her commitment to southern Turkey with the presentation of antique sculptures in Cilicia. Related materials found on a trip to Israel in the Rockefeller Museum, Jerusalem, were added to the above publication.

During 2005-2008, she conducted research on Late archaic sculpture, that resulted in pinning down subtle but highly important and meaningful distinctive features in the transitional period of late Archaic and early Classical sculpture. A detailed study of a black marble head (whose typological affinity on the basis of two relatively well preserved surviving coins, one in the Bibliothèque nationale, Paris, and the other in the Berlin Münz-Cabinet) points to the Apollo Philesios by Canachus in Didyma, dating from the early 5th Century BC. This study will be of major import for identifying the above major features in rendering the physiognomic, facial and portrayal details. These appear to have been largely overlooked in previous field research and studies on the art of Greek sculpture and the sudden stylistic change from the late Archaic and Severe periods to early the Classical.

She is now on the advisory board of Adem's Clay, a design firm in Berlin.

== Published works ==
61: Meischner, J. und Laflı E. Eine frühklassische Stele aus Samsun/Amisos. In: Istanbuler Mitteilungen, 65, Ernst Wasmuth Verlag, Tübingen, 2015, 63-81. ISBN 978-3803016560

60: Meischner, J. und Laflı E. Der Fischer am Meer. Römische Brunnenlandschaften. In: Il Mar Nero 8, 2010/2011, 231-238. Edizioni Quasar, Rom 2013. ISBN 978-88-7140-520-9, ISSN 1125-3878

59: Meischner, J. Das Spitzbauchknäblein aus Elaiussa Sebasté, Kilikien, Études et Travaux 25, Edition Wydawnictwo Neriton, Warschau 2012, 254-259. ISBN 9788392231967

56: Meischner, J. [Rez. zu]: K. Fittschen, P. Zanker, P. Cain, Katalog der römischen Porträts in den Capitolinischen Museen. In: Janka, Luther, Schmitzer (Hrsg.): Gymnasium 2012, Band 119, Heft 2, 205-207. Universitätsverlag Winter, Heidelberg. ISSN 0342-5231

55: Meischner, J. Spätantike Skulpturen im östlichen Mittelmeerraum, Jahreshefte des Österreichischen Archäologischen Instituts in Wien 179, 2010, 179-204. ISBN 978-3-900305-58-1, ISSN 0078-3579

54b: Meischner. J. Die attische Girlande und der Sarkophag Caffarelli. In: Babesch 83-2008, Stichting Bulletin Antieke Beschaving, Verlag Orientaliste Leuven, 2008. ISSN 0165-9367

54: Meischner, J. Zur Datierung der Götterstatuen vom Esquilin, Amicitiae Gratia, Athen 2008,197-202. ISBN 978-960-214-699-6, ISSN 1108-1244

53: Meischner, J. Antiochos V. und Anbtiochos VI. Legitimationshilfen an Bildnissen von Kinderkönigen, Collection de L'École Française de Rome 390, 2007.

52: Meischner, J. Hellenistische und römische Grabstelen im Archäologischen Museum von Hatay in Antakya, Jahreshefte des Österreichischen Archäologischen Instituts in Wien 77, 2008, 145-183. ISBN 978-3-7001-6673-3, ISSN 0078-3579

51: Meischner, J. Spätantike Wandmalerei im unteren Donauraum, Il Mar Nero, Edizioni Quasar di Severino Tognon s.r.l., Roma 2001-2003, 113-141. ISSN 1125-3878

50: Meischner, J. Ein Porträt der Kaiserin Justina im Vatikan. In: Hommages à Carl Deroux. Éditions Latomus, Bruxelles 2003, 200-202. ISBN 2-87031-218-0

49: Meischner, J. Eine spätantike Idealstatue in Villa Medici, Anadolu'da Dogdu: Festschrift Fahrı Isik, Ege Yaginlari Istanbul 2004, 493-497 Abb.. ISBN 975-807-079-7

48: Meischner, J. Zwei Porträttypen Kaiser Diokletians, in: The Roman and Late Roman City, Prof. Marin Drinov Academic Publishing House, Sofia 2002, 356-360. ISBN 954-430-845-8

47: Meischner, J. El Missorium de Teodosio : una nueva interpretacion, in: El Disco de Teodosio, Real Academia de la Historia, Madrid 2000, 233-252, Abb. ISBN 84-89512-60-4

46: Meischner, Jutta, 1935. Späte Archaik und früher Strenger Stil : der Apollon Philesios des Kanachos Typus I und II = Late Archaic and early Severe Style : the Apollon Philesios by Kanachos Type I and II (2009), ISBN 978-3-9807842-5-2. Publisher: edition bnb

44: Meischner, J. Eine spätantike Porträtbüste im Louvre, Patronus: Festschrift für Coskun Özgünel zum 65. Geburtstag, Homerbooks Istanbul 2007, 259-263. ISBN 9944-483-11-7, ISBN 978-9944-483-11-7

43: Meischner, J. [Rez. zu]: K. Schade: Frauen in der Spätantike - Status und Repräsentation. Eine Untersuchung zur römischen und frühbyzantinischen Bildniskunst. In: Gnomon 77/2005, Verlag C.H. Beck, München 2005, 350ff.

42: Meischner, J. Die Skulpturen des Hatay Museums von Antakya, Jahrbuch des Deutschen Archäologischen Museums, Band 118, 2003, 285-384. Verlag Walter de Gruyter, Berlin.

41: Meischner, J. [Rez. zu]: M. Bergmann: Chiragan, Aphrodisias, Konstantinopel. Zur mythologischen Skulptur der Spätantike. In: Klein, Schmitzer (Hrsg.): Gymnasium Band 110, 2003, 402-403. Universitätsverlag Winter, Heidelberg.

40: Meischner, J. Cussini, Eleonora. Vier palmyrenische Grabreliefs im Museum von Antakya. In: Jahrbuch des Archäologischen Instituts 2003, Verlag Philipp von Zabern, Mainz 2004, 97-105. ISBN 3-8053-3347-1, ISSN 0003-8105

39: Meischner, J. [Rez. zu]: Jutta Rumscheid: Kranz und Krone. Zu Insignien, Siegespreisen und Ehrenzeichen der römischen Kaiserzeit. In: Klein, Schmitzer (Hrsg.): Gnomon 2002, 617-620. Verlag C.H. Beck, München.

38: Meischner, J. Ein Porträt Antiochos' VI. Epiphanes Dionysos in Mersin. In: Istanbuler Mitteilungen Band 51/2001, Ernst Wasmuth Verlag, Tübingen 2001, 273-278. ISBN 3-8030-1642-8, ISSN 0341-9142

37: Meischner, J. Bildnisse der Spätantike 193-500: Problemfelder; die Privatporträts, Berlin 2001, edition.bnb. ISBN 3-9807842-0-7.

36b: Meischner, J. Der letzte Kaiser. Zum Porträt der nachtheodosianischen Epoche bis 500 n. Chr. S. 45ff. In: Jan Bouzek, Iva Ondrejova (Hrsg.): Roman Portraits. Artistic and Literary, Verlag Philipp von Zabern, Mainz 1997. ISBN 3-80532335-2

36: Meischner, J. Das Missorium des Theodosius in Madrid. In: Jahrbuch des Deutschen Archäologischen Instituts, Band 111, 1996, 389-432, Abb. Verlag Walter de Gruyter, Berlin. ISBN 3-11-014947-8, ISSN 0070-4415

35: Meischner, J. [Rez. zu]: S. Schröder, Katalog der antiken Skulpturen des Museo del Prado in Madrid, 1. Die Porträts, Bonner Jahrbücher 1995, Rheinland-Verlag, Köln 1995, 720-722. ISSN 0067-9976

34: Meischner, J. Bildtradition antiker Wettkampfrequisiten, In: Jahrbuch des Deutschen Archäologischen Instituts 1995, Band 110, S. 447–466, Abb. Verlag Walter de Gruyter, Berlin. ISBN 3-11-014523-5, ISSN 0070-4415

33: Meischner, J. Bemerkungen zu einigen Kaiserporträts des 3. Jahrhunderts n.Chr. Philippus Arabs, Aurelian, Diokletian. In: Archäologischer Anzeiger 1995, 375-387 Abb. Verlag Walter de Gruyter, Berlin. ISSN 0003-8105

32: Meischner, J. Studien zur spätantiken Kaiserikonographie. In: Jahrbuch des Deutschen Archäologischen Instituts 1995, Band 110, S. 431–446, Abb. Verlag Walter de Gruyter, Berlin. ISBN 3-11-014523-5, ISSN 0070-4415

31: Meischner, J. Zum Porträt der "Poppäa Albani" In: Carl Deroux (Hrsg.): Latomus, 1993, 399-406, Taf.

30: Meischner, J. Familie Valentinian gratuliert. In: Istanbuler Mitteilungen 1993, 463-466, Taf. Verlag Ernst Wasmuth GmbH, Tübingen 1994. ISBN 3-8030-1634-7, ISSN 0341-9142

29: Meischner, J. Der Hochzeitskameo des Honorius. In: Archäologischer Anzeiger 1993, 613-619, Abb. Verlag Walter de Gruyter, Berlin. ISSN 0003-8105

28: Meischner, J. Das Porträt der valentinianischen Epoche. In: Jahrbuch des Deutschen Archäologischen Instituts, Band 107, 1992, 217-234, Taf, Verlag Walter de Gruyter, Berlin. ISBN 3-11-013234-6, ISSN 0070-4415

27: Meischner, J. Das Porträt der theodosianischen Epoche, II (400 bis 460 n.Chr.). In: Jahrbuch des Deutschen Archäologischen Instituts, Band 106, 1991, 385-407, Taf. Verlag Walter de Gruyter, Berlin. ISBN 3-11-012701-6, ISSN 0070-4415

26: Meischner, J. Das Porträt der Galla Placidia im Museo dell'alto medioevo, Rom. In: Carl Deroux (Hrsg.): Latomus 1991, 861-864, Taf.

25: Meischner, J. Das Porträt der theodosianischen Epoche (380 bis 405 n.Chr.). In: Jahrbuch des Deutschen Archäologischen Instituts, Band 105, 1990, 303-324, Abb. Verlag Walter de Gruyter, Berlin. ISBN 3-11-012-249-9, ISSN 0070-4415

24: Meischner, J. Ein theodosianisches Porträt, Études et Travaux 15, Zaklad Archeologii Srodziemnomorskiej Pan, Warschau 1990, 257-264, Abb. ISBN 83-900096-0-9, ISSN 0079-3566

23: Meischner, J. Zwei Gewichtbronzen in Form von Kaiserporträts, Römische Mitteilungen Band 96-1989, Verlag Philipp von Zabern, Mainz 1989, 407-418, Taf.. ISBN 3-8053-1077-3, ISSN 0342-1287

22b: Meischner, J. Theodosianische Porträts. In: Ritratto Ufficiale e Ritratto Privato, Consiglio Nazionale delle Richerche, Rom 1988, 375-382 Abb.

22: Meischner, J. [Rez.zu]: Katalog der römischen Porträts in den Capitolinischen Museen und den anderen kommunalen Sammlungen der Stadt Rom, 1. Kaiser- und Prinzenbildnisse, Bonner Jahrbücher 1987, Band 187, Rheinland-Verlag, Köln 1987, 765-771. ISSN 0067-9976

21: Meischner, J. [Rez.zu]: Katalog der romischen Porträts in den Capitolinischen Museen und den anderen kommunalen Sammlungen der Stadt Rom. 3. Kaiserinnen- und Prinzessinnenbildnisse, Frauenporträts, Bonner Jahrbücher 1986, Band 186, Rheinland-Verlag, Köln 1986, 804-809. ISSN 0067-9976

20: Meischner, J. [Rez. zu]: Das Haus des Augustus auf dem Palatin. In: Gymnasium Band 93 1986, Carl Winter Universitätsverlag, Heidelberg 1986 232-233. ISSN 0342-5231

19: Meischner, J. Die Porträtkunst der ersten und zweiten Tetrarchie bis zur Alleinherrschaft Konstantins, 293 bis 324 n.Chr. In: Archäologischer Anzeiger 1986, 223-250, Abb. Verlag Walter de Gruyter, Berlin. ISSN 0003-8105

18: Meischner, J. Zu einem Männerbildnis in Boston. In: Archäologischer Anzeiger 1985, 135-140, Abb. Verlag Walter de Gruyter, Berlin. ISSN 0003-8105

17: Meischner, J. Privatporträts aus den Regierungsjahren des Elagabal und Alexander Severus, 218 - 235. In: Jahrbuch des Deutschen Archäologischen Instituts 1984, 319-351, Abb. Verlag Walter de Gruyter, Berlin. ISBN 978-3-11-009863-1 ISSN 0070-4415

16: Meischner, J. Eine spätantoninische Porträtgruppe. In: Archäologischer Anzeiger 1983, 607-610, Abb. Verlag Walter de Gruyter, Berlin. ISSN 0003-8105

15: Meischner, J. Privatporträts der Jahre 195 bis 220 n. Chr. In: Jahrbuch des Deutschen Archäologischen Instituts, Band 97, 1982, 401-439, Abb. Verlag Walter de Gruyter, Berlin. ISBN 3-11-008710-3, ISSN 0070-4415

14: Meischner, J. Eine frühseverische Togabüste. In: Babesch 1982, Bulletin Antieke Beschaving, Verlag Orientaliste, Leuven 1982, 118-120, Taf. ISSN 0165-9367

13: Meischner, J. [Rez.zu]: Ein Bildnis des Königs Antiochos IV. von Syrien. Archäologischer Anzeiger 1982, Verlag Walter de Gruyter, Berlin 1983, 637-638. ISSN 0003-8105

12: Meischner, J. Bildnisse des Maximianus Herculius. Zum Kaiserkopf im Archäologischen Museum Mailand. In: Ermanno Arslan (Hrsg.): Notizie dal Chiostro dal monastero maggiore. Rassegna di studi del civico museo archeologico e del civico gabinetto numismatico Milano 1981, 37-46, Taf. Verlag Fratelli Azzimonti, S. Donato Milanese.

11: Meischner, J. Fragen zur römischen Porträtgeschichte unter besonderer Berücksichtigung kleinasiatischer Beispiele. Bonner Jahrbücher 1981, Rheinland-Verlag, Köln 1981, 143-167, Abb. ISSN 0067-9976

10: Meischner, J. [Rez.zu]: M. Bergmann: Marc Aurel. In: Bömer, Voit (Hrsg.): Gymnasium Band 87 1980, S. 138ff. Carl Winter Universotätsverlag, Heidelberg. ISSN 0342-5231

9: Meischner, J. Bonaventura Genelli: Centaurenfamilie. In: Vereniging Antieke Beschaving (Hrsg.): Bulletin Antieke Beschaving 1975, S. 273–274.

8: Meischner, J. Preiskrone und Preiszylinder. In: Jahrbuchn des Deutschen Archäologischen Instituts, Band 89, 1974, S. 336–346, Abb. Verlag Walter de Gruyter, Berlin 1975. Abb. ISBN 3-11-004932-5

7: Meischner, J. Beobachtungen zu einem bärtigen Reliefkopf in Pergamon. In: Istanbuler Mitteilungen Band 22, 1972, 113-132, Abb. Verlag Ernst Wasmuth, Tübingen 1973. ISBN 3-8030-1615-0

6: Meischner, J. Der Diadumenian Woburn-Munchen. In: Archäologischer Anzeiger 1970, S. 241–247, Verlag Walter de Gruyter, Berlin. Abb. ISSN 0003-8105

5: Meischner, J. Ein Pferdeamulett aus Bogazkoy. In: Jahrbuch des Archäologischen Instituts, Band 84, 1969, S:179-188, Abb. Verlag Walter de Gruyter, Berlin.

4: Meischner, J. Ein Porträt des Kaisers Volusianus. In: Archäologischer Anzeiger 1967, Verlag Walter de Gruyter, Berlin 1967, 220-228, Abb. ISSN 0003-8105

3: Meischner, J. Zwei Stilrichtungen der Porträtkunst des mittleren 3. Jahrhunderts nach Christus. Zum Bildnis des Maximinus Thrax. In: Archäologischer Anzeiger 1967, Verlag Walter de Gruyter, Berlin 1967, 34-46, Abb. ISSN 0003-8105

2: Meischner, J. Das Frauenporträt der Severerzeit Berlin : Philosophischen Fakultat der Freien Universitat Berlin, 1964. Umfang 194 p., [29] p. of plates (1 folded) : ill. Dissertation Zugl.: Berlin, Freie Universitat, Diss.,1966

1: Meischner, J. Zum Bildnis der Kaiserin Crispina. In: Jahrbuch des Deutschen Archäologischen Instituts und Archäologischer Anzeiger, Band 76, 1961, S. 188–192, Abb. Verlag Walter de Gruyter, Berlin 1962. ISSN 0003-8105
