= Tessera =

Individual tile used in a mosaic

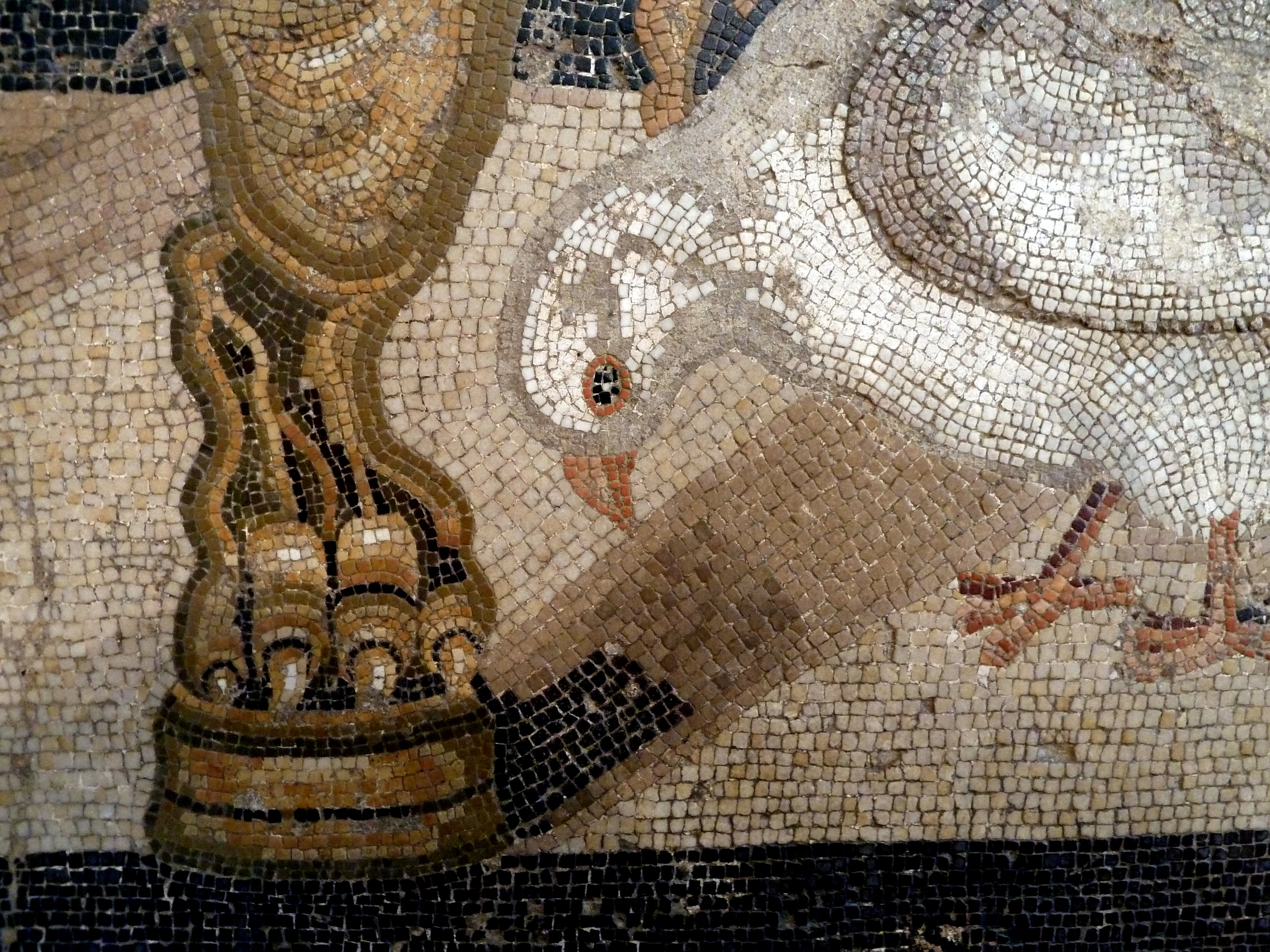
Tesserae of a mosaic of doves drinking at a golden basin, 1st century AD, National Archaeological Museum, Naples, Italy

A tessera (plural: tesserae, diminutive tessella) is an individual tile, usually formed in the shape of a square, used in creating a mosaic. It is also known as an abaciscus or abaculus.

== Historical tesserae ==
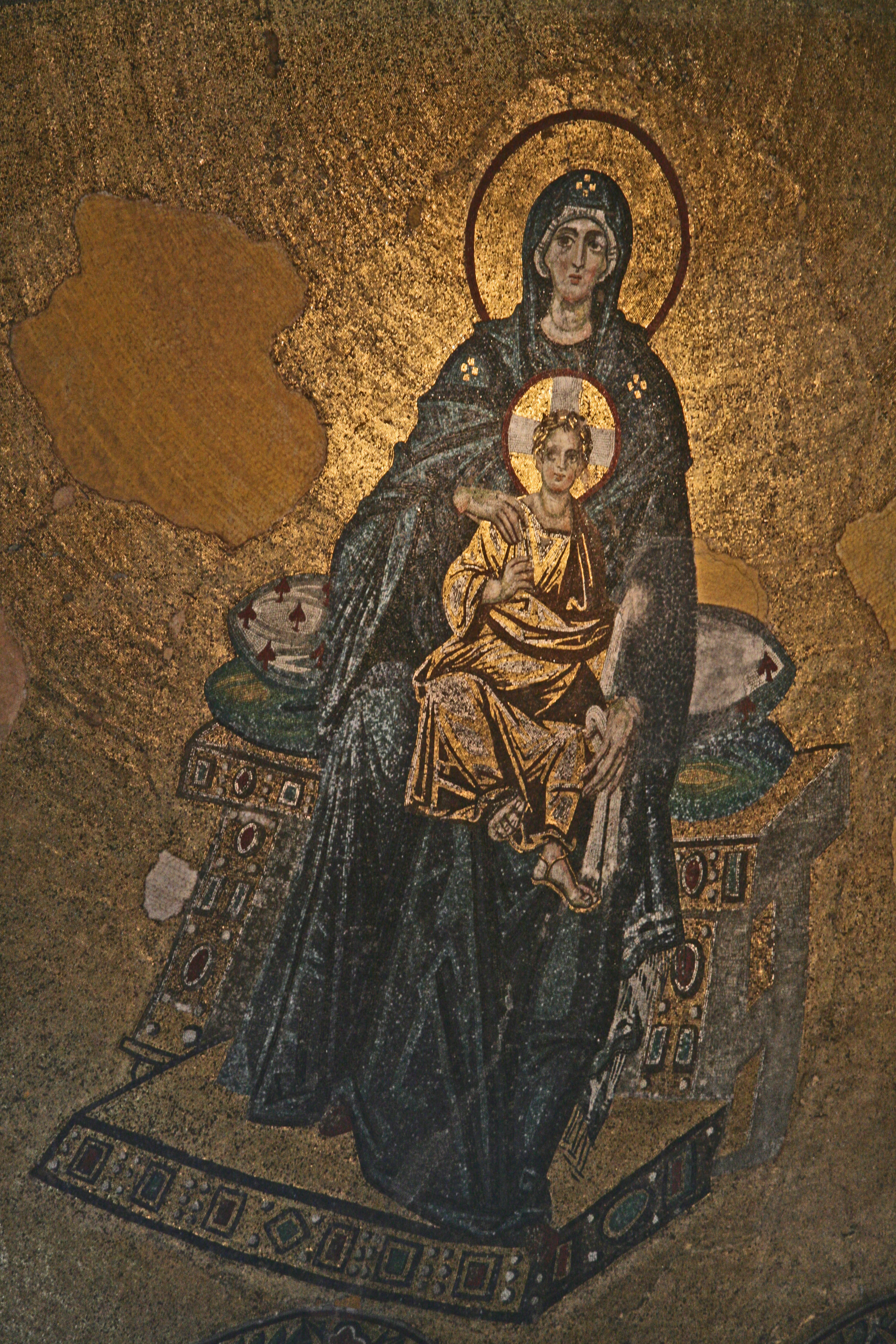
Apse mosaic of the Virgin Mother and Child, Hagia Sophia, featuring intensely luminous golden tesserae

In early antiquity, mosaics were formed from naturally formed colored pebbles. By roughly 200 BC cut stone tesserae were being used in Hellenistic-Greek mosaics. For instance, a large body of surviving material from the Hellenistic period can be found in the mosaics of Delos, Greece, dating to the late 2nd century BC. Ancient Roman decorative mosaic panels and floor mosaics were also produced during the 2nd century BC, particularly at sites such as Antioch and Pompeii. Marble or limestone were cut into small cubes and arranged into representational designs and geometric patterns.

Later, tesserae were made from colored glass, or clear glass backed with metal foils. The Byzantines used tesserae with gold leaf, in which case the glass pieces were flatter, with two glass pieces sandwiching the gold. This produced a golden reflection emanating from in between the tesserae as well as their front, causing a far richer and more luminous effect than even plain gold leaf would create.

== Contemporary tesserae ==
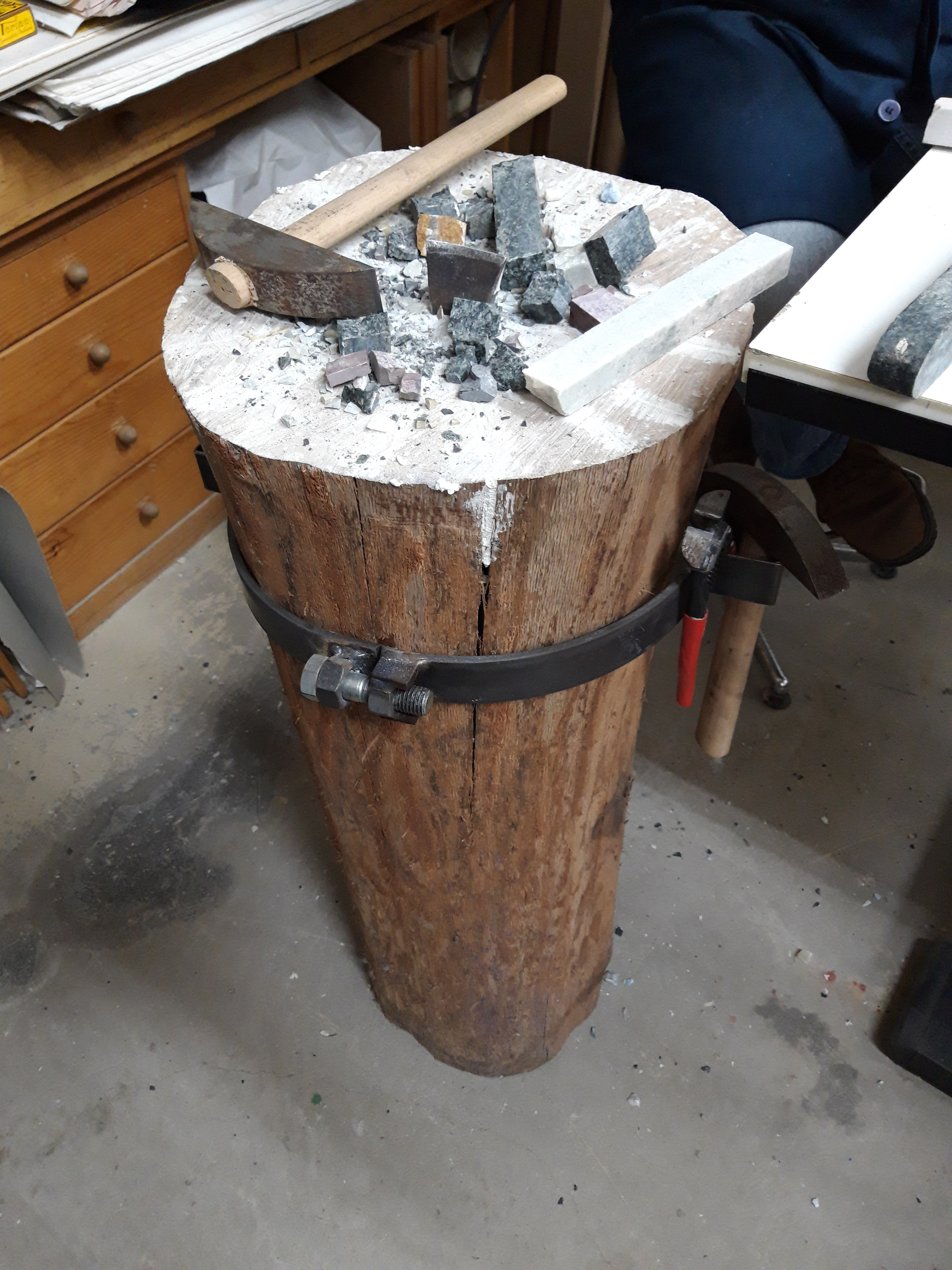
Wooden block with hammer and hardy for cutting mosaic tiles.

=== Vitreous glass ===
These are manufactured glass tiles made to a uniform shape and size. They are made by molten glass being poured into trays and fired. An imprint of grooves is made on their underside for help with adhesion to cement when fixing.

=== Iridised, marbled, & metallic tesserae ===
Iridised (with a reflective quality), marbled (featuring contrasting and complementary colors), metallic (semi-transparent with gold or bronze veins), and millefiori (round handmade Murano tesserae with intricate patterns) tesserae are also widely used.

=== Ceramic tesserae ===
These are the cheapest range of bought materials and can be glazed or unglazed. The glazed ceramic tiles have the color painted onto the top of the clay and then fired to a high temperature in a kiln. The unglazed or body glazed version has the color mixed into the wet clay so the color runs through them. They vary in size.

=== Smalti ===
This is the classic mosaic material. It is opaque glass fired in large slabs in a kiln and then hand cut into small cubes with a hammer and hardy chisel. Their irregular finish makes them reflect light well and this material is best used working straight into cement. It is produced in Venice and sold by colour and weight.

=== Gold smalti ===
This tile is made with gold and silver leaf sandwiched between two layers of glass and fired twice in the kiln to embed in the metal.

=== Mirror ===
Mirror fragments are available as offcuts from glass-cutting shops.

=== Stained glass ===
Opaque stained glass comes as large sheets that can be cut into smaller sections with a glasscutter.

=== Household ceramic tiles and china ===
Various household objects, including pottery shards, can be used, especially in trencadís or pique assiette technique.

== See also ==
- Tessellation – describes tessellation patterns
- Mosaic – describes techniques for assembling tesserae into a design
