= Worcester Hunt Mosaic =

Byzantine mosaic

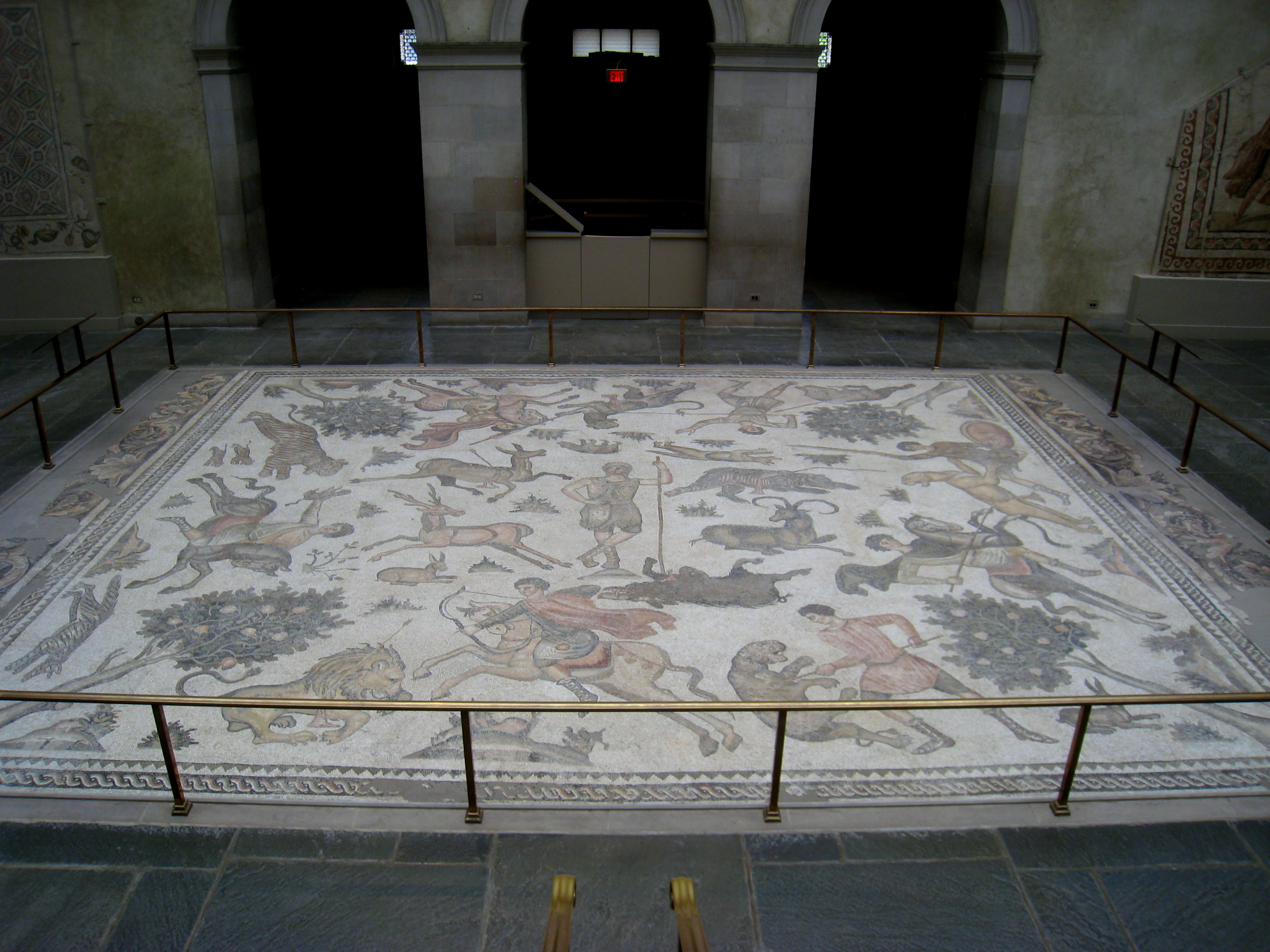
A side view of the Worcester Hunt Mosaic from inside the Worcester Art Museum.

The Worcester Hunt Mosaic is a large Byzantine floor mosaic located at Worcester Art Museum in Worcester, Massachusetts. The mosaic was originally constructed for an upscale villa in Daphne, just outside of Antioch. The mosaic was discovered during an archeological expedition which lasted between 1932 and 1939. It is currently the largest Antioch mosaic located within the United States. It measures approximately 20.5 by 23.3 feet (6.2 by 7.1 m).

== History ==
Mosaics were an important form of Byzantine art and many examples were produced between the 6th and the 15th century AD. The Worcester Hunt is a well-preserved example of sixth century Byzantine mosaics. Most large-scale works of Byzantine art during this period were commissioned by the Eastern Orthodox Church or wealthy patrons of the elite upper classes. Mosaics were a significant development during the sixth century and were commonly used to adorn the interior floors and walls of church buildings as a display of religious fervor and political authority.

Located in the southwestern corner of Anatolia along the Mediterranean coastline, Daphne was an ancient resort community situated in the hills overlooking the Seleucid city of Antioch, which the Byzantines inherited from the Roman Empire. Antioch was a strategically important city at the confluences of significant trade routes. The political and cultural significance of Antioch and its surrounding areas was displayed through grand artistic works such as floor mosaics. From the 3rd century onwards, mosaics became a popular form of ornamentation among the wealthy elite.

The Worcester Hunt was constructed in the early sixth century, likely during the reign of Justinian I. It is unique among other well-known Byzantine mosaics because it was not located in a place of worship, and it does not depict religious themes. Pre-Iconoclastic mosaics such as the Worcester Hunt are valuable sources of early Byzantine art because the political and social upheaval of the Iconoclasm resulted in the destruction of many artistic creations including mosaics. The scale of the Worcester Hunt and the location in which it was constructed suggests that it was the private property of a wealthy Byzantine aristocrat. This mosaic would have been the centerpiece of a large residence, built for the purpose of leaving a lasting impression upon guests. The scale of the Worcester Hunt in comparison to other privately owned Byzantine works of this period demonstrates the extensive time and funding that would have been required to create such a piece. The relatively well-preserved state of this large mosaic is also notable because this region experienced frequent earthquakes throughout the centuries.

In 1268, the Mamluks of Egypt sacked the city of Antioch and most of the inhabitants were killed while others were enslaved. The population of Antioch continued a gradual decline over the next few centuries until all that remained of the city were a series of uninhabited ruins.

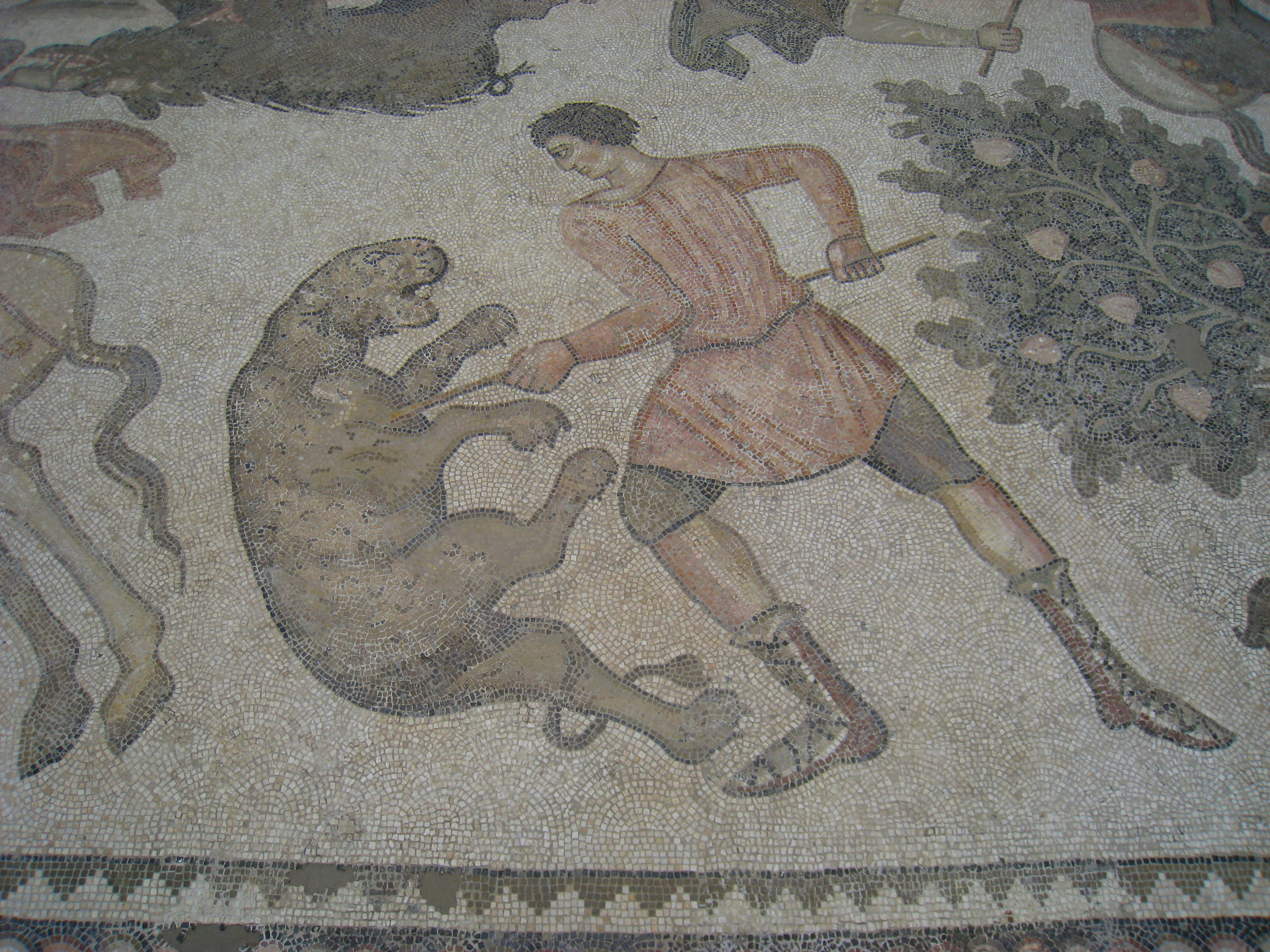
One of the dismounted hunters in the mosaic uses a spear to kill dangerous game.

In 1931, the "Committee for the Excavation of Antioch and Its Vicinity" was created by a coalition of archaeologists funded by the Louvre Museum, the Baltimore Museum of Art, the Worcester Art Museum, Princeton University, and Harvard University. The expedition began in 1932, but archaeologists did not locate any major buildings as they had intended. They did however manage to uncover a great deal of mosaics in Antioch and the surrounding areas, including the ones found at Daphne. Some of the discoveries remained in modern-day Turkey while others such as the Worcester Hunt were purchased by educational institutions. In 1936, Worcester Museum acquired the Worcester Hunt mosaic, where it remains today.

== Description ==
The mosaic features multiple hunters, who are presumed to be members of the Byzantine aristocracy. Some are riding horses while others are stationary. At the center of the piece stands a single hunter who observes others as they use bows, spears, and swords to subdue large, dangerous game animals. The mosaic also depicts younger animals that are not the target of the hunters. This feature indicates that the hunters may have possessed an understanding of conservation and that their efforts were deliberately aimed at preventing the extinction of these animals. Some of these animals (most notably the tiger) would have been considered exotic game as they were not native to the region. This piece is an excellent example of secular Byzantine art as it lacks any significant religious iconography or allusions. Although faded to a degree, much of the vivid coloring in this piece remains easily visible.

== Stylistic influences ==
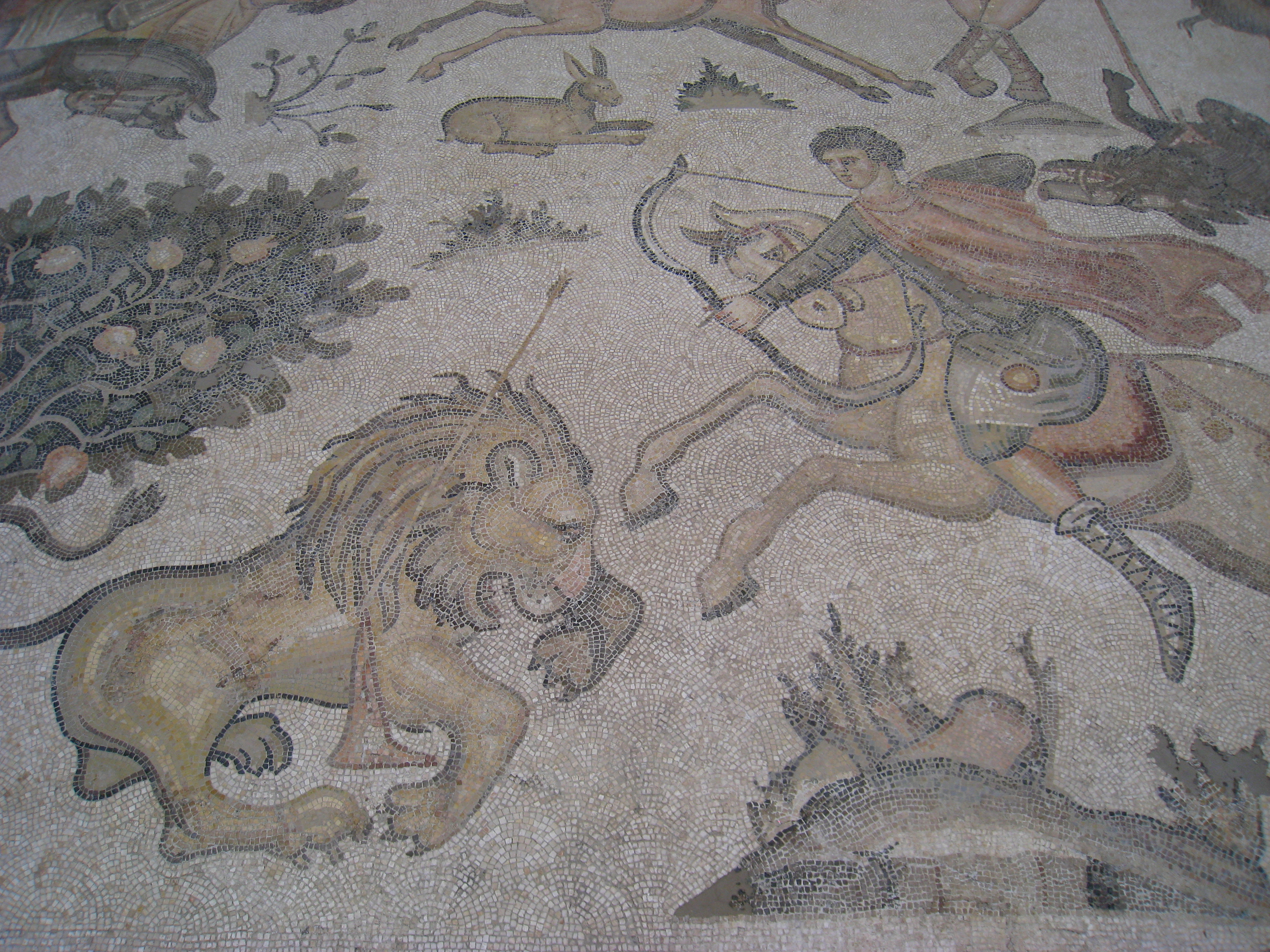
A hunter on horseback uses a bow to subdue dangerous game.

The region surrounding Antioch represented a crossroads between the Eastern and Western art forms in the late antiquity and early medieval periods. This blending of artistic styles is reflected in several ways when examining the Worcester Hunt. The figures are all arranged in a circular pattern around a central figure, which is a trademark feature of ancient Persian artwork. While the garments of the hunters appear to be of Greco-Roman origin, some of the weapons observed have a more eastern-inspired style. The mosaic contains a somewhat abstract depiction of humans while the animals appear to be more detailed, giving them a more realistic appearance. Many artists of this period sought to evoke classical elements in their work and this resulted in a tendency to incorporate classical Greco-Roman principles into Byzantine art. The various thematic elements showcased in the mosaic demonstrate how the artist incorporated styles from multiple cultures when constructing this piece. Byzantine art fluctuated between naturalistic and abstract depictions depending on social and religious factors.

== See also ==
- Antioch mosaics
- Byzantine art
- Byzantine mosaics
- Byzantine Empire
