= Hatay Archaeology Museum =

Archaeology museum in Antakya, Turkey

Coordinates: 36.2019°N 36.16°E

- Hatay Arkeoloji Müzesi
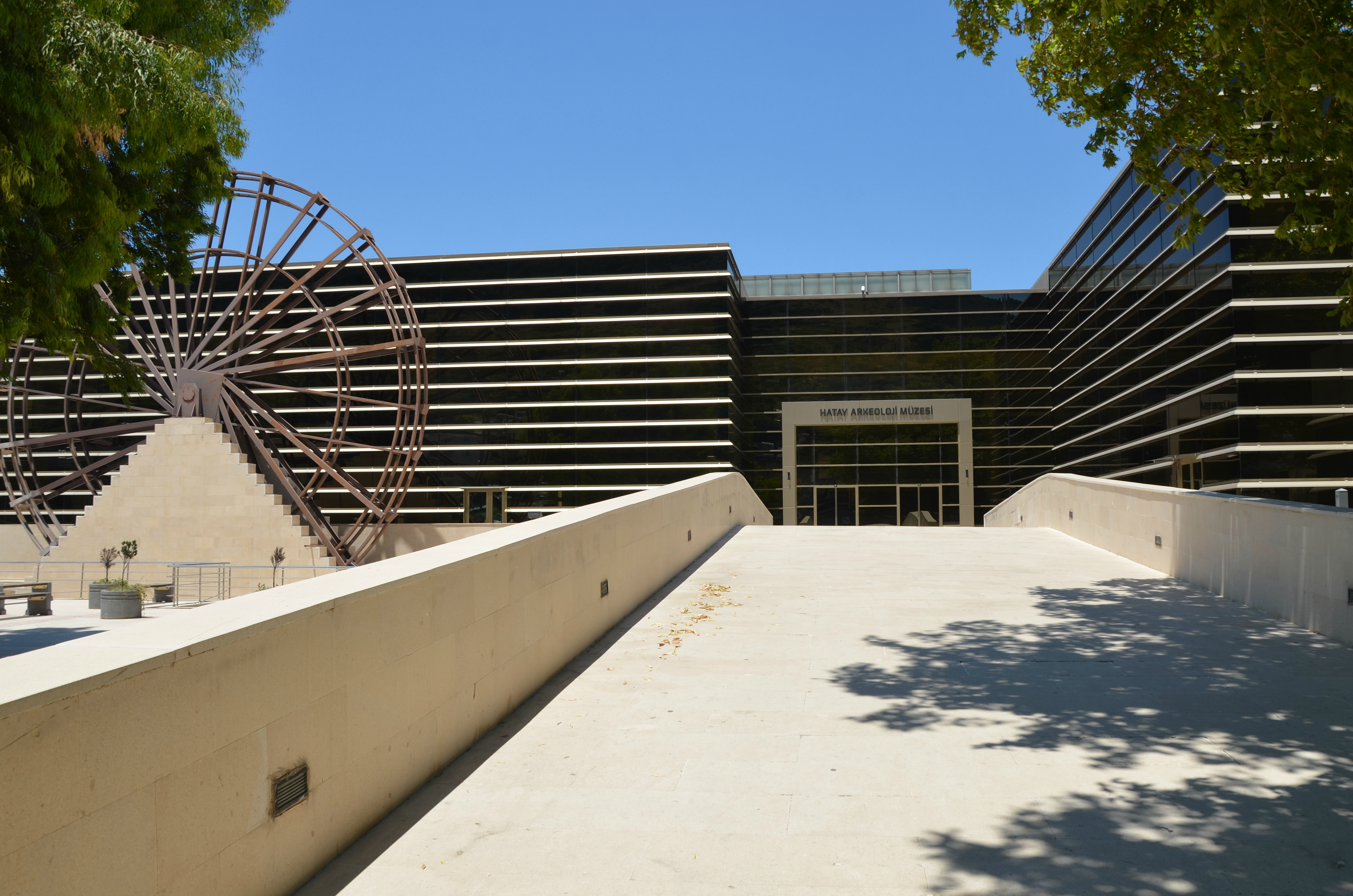
- Established: 1948
- Location: Antakya, Hatay, Turkey
- Type: museum

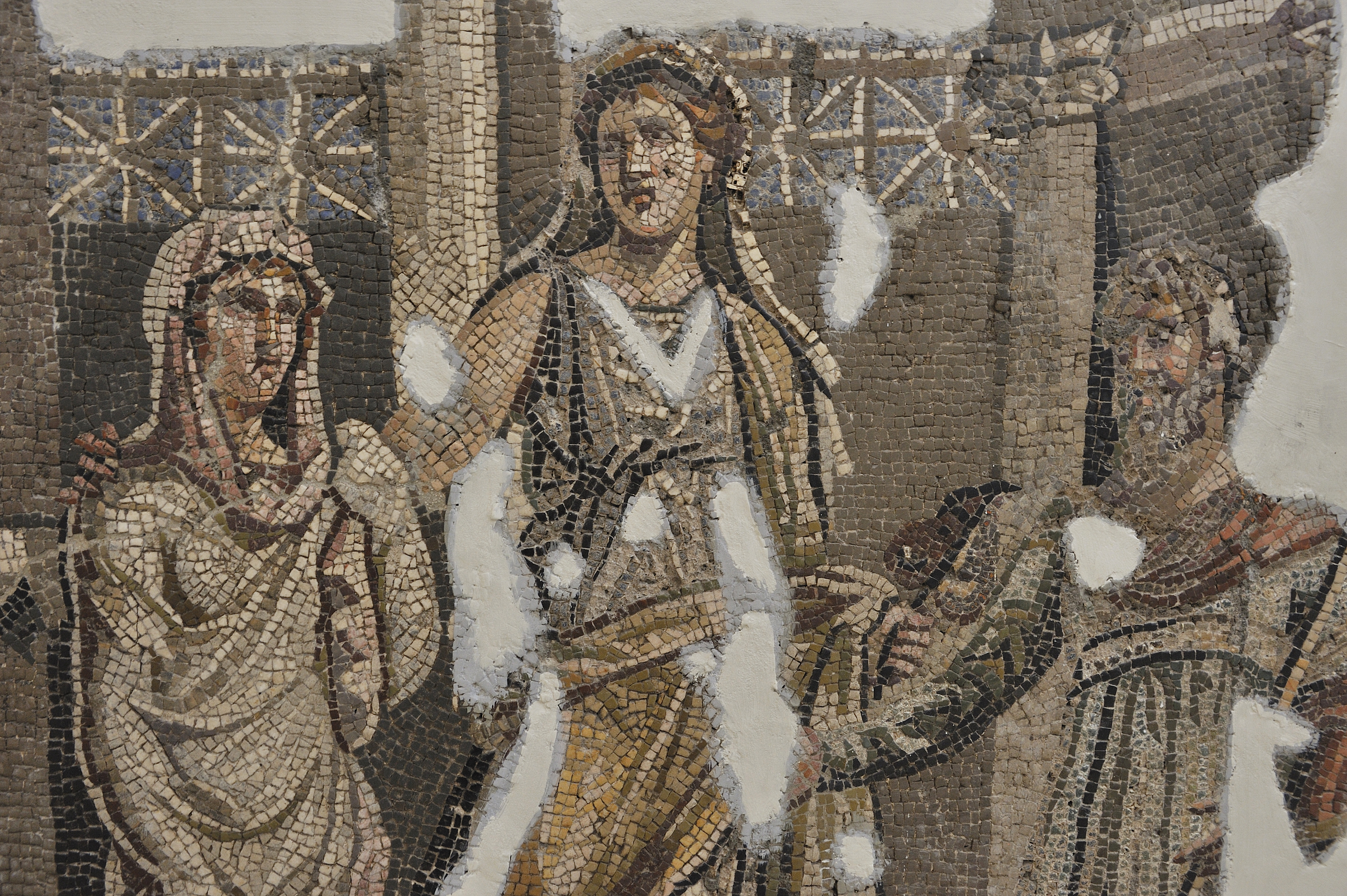
Iphigenia in Aulis mosaic

The Hatay Archaeology Museum (Turkish: Hatay Arkeoloji Müzesi) is the archaeology museum of Antakya, Turkey. It is known for its extensive collection of Roman and Byzantine Era mosaics. The museum is located in Antakya, the main city of Hatay. Construction of the museum started in 1934 on the recommendation of the French archaeologist and antiquities inspector Claude M. Prost. It was completed in 1938 and came under Turkish control in 1939 following Hatay's unification with Turkey. The museum was opened to the public in 1948 and re-opened in 1975 following renovation and expansion. The old location has been vacated, and the museum now is in a newly built museum (opening date of the second phase in 2019), much larger than the old one and with exhibits that have partly been excavated recently.

With 3,500 sqm of mosaics displayed in 10,700 sqm of exhibition space and 32,754 sqm of total indoor space, the museum is claimed to be the largest mosaic museum in the world.

The museum sustained some damage in the 2023 Turkey–Syria earthquake.

== Collection ==
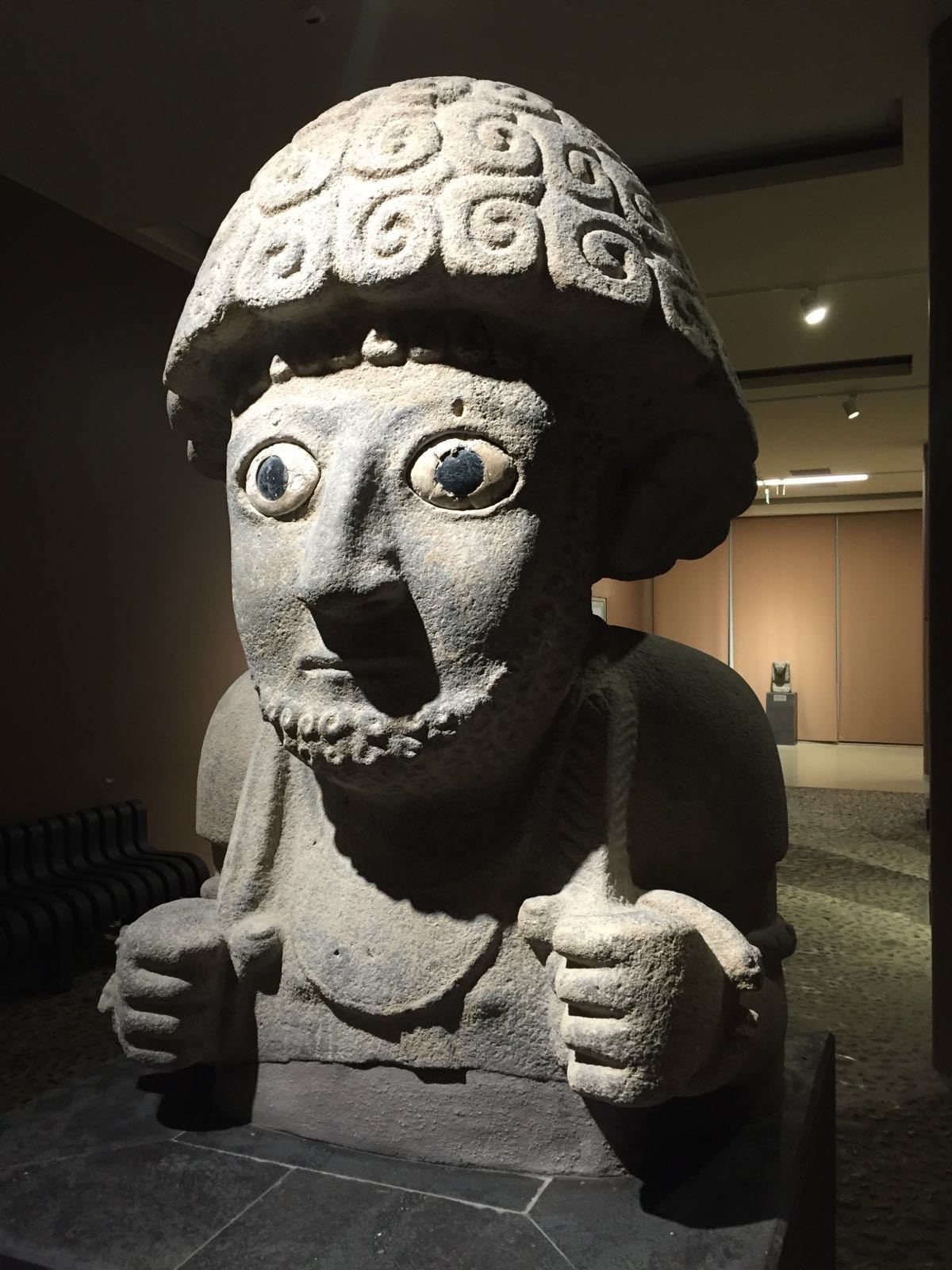
Statue of Šuppiluliuma I

Hatay has a rich collection of mosaics dating back to the Hellenistic and to the Roman era in the 2nd and 3rd centuries. They have been found in the ancient cities of Daphne, Seleucia Pieria (Samandağ), Antioch and Tarsus.

The most famous figures among those depicted by the mosaics are the drunken Dionysos, Orpheus, Dancers, Ariadne Abandoned from Defne (Yakto). Column capitals, a sacrificial altar, a cult image, a bas-relief, a fresco and statues date from the Hittites to Roman periods. They were found by excavations in barrows in the plain of Amik. The works in the museum are arranged according to where they were found.

Excavations have been carried out at barrows, tells and ruins such as Guneyde, Dehep, Çatalhöyük, Tainat, Al Mina, Ac-ana, Defne-Harbiye and so on. The collection also includes objects from Antakya and its surrounding regions.

The museum's collection also includes items that reflect the art and culture of the region, from the Paleolithic Age through the present day. The objects are displayed in wall niches. Against the other walls of the room are cases that display a rare coin collection arranged chronologically. The museum's garden includes Roman period sarcophagi, building stones and water jars. In 1999 German archeologist Jutta Meischner received permission to study and publicize Greek and Roman sculptures from the Hatay Archeology Museum. In early 2012, a section of the museum's collection was digitized as part of an effort to increase museum attendance.

== Restoration ==
Restoration taking place in 2014-2015 was suspended after several major works were botched and local media brought it to the attention of the public.

== See also ==
- Antioch
- Antioch mosaics
- Megalopsychia Hunt of Antioch mosaics
