= Judgement of Paris Amphora =

- Amphora of the London B 76 Painter, Amphore du Jugement de Pâris
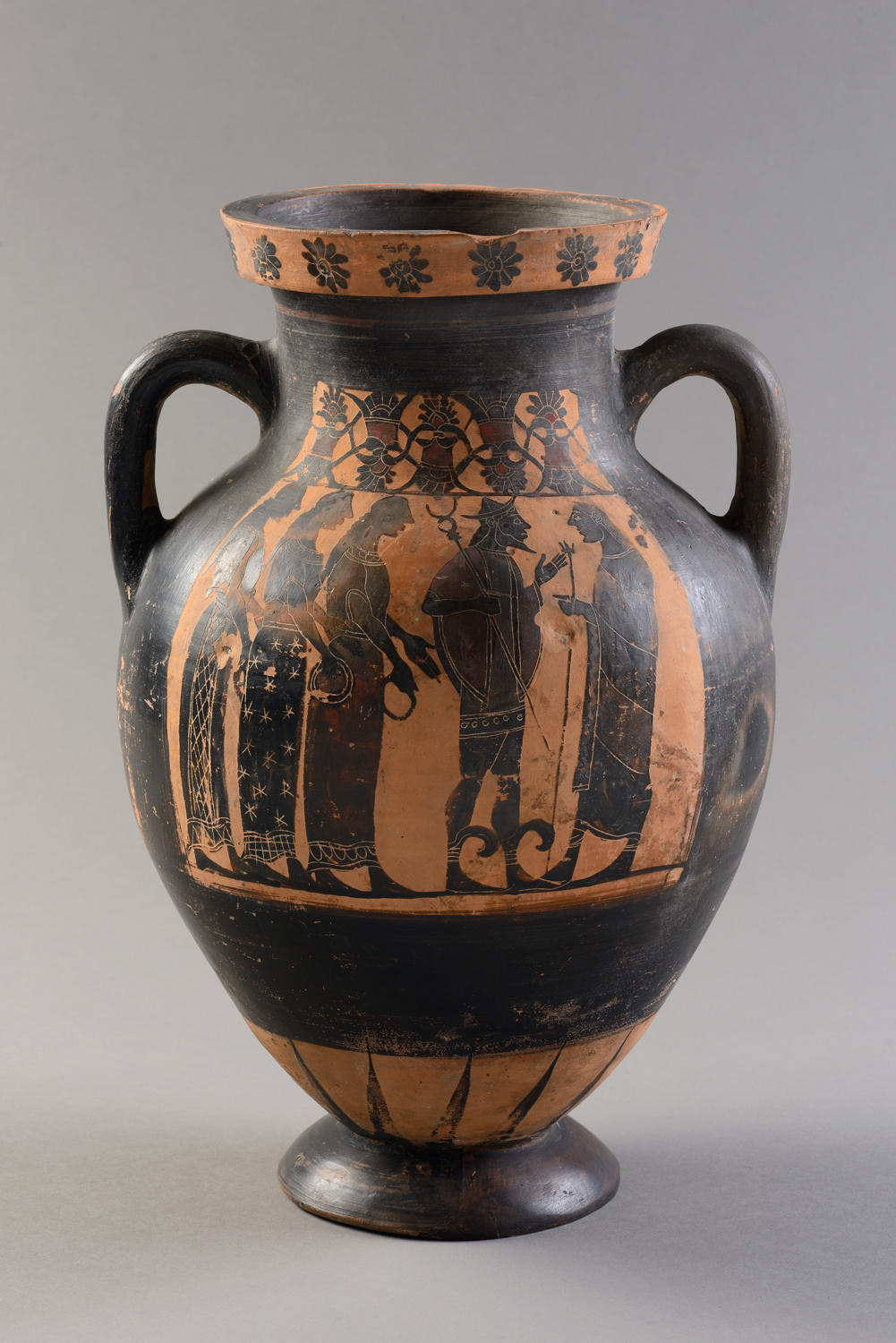
- Artist: London B 76 Painter
- Year: 575–550 BC
- Catalog: inventory number E 581-c
- Type: Attic black-figure belly amphora
- Dimensions: 36 cm (14 in); 23.4 cm (diameter)
- Location: Musée des beaux-arts de Lyon, Lyon

The Judgement of Paris Amphora (French: amphore du Jugement de Pâris) is an Attic black-figure belly amphora dating to about 575–550 BC. It is named after the mythological scene of the Judgement of Paris shown on one side. The vase is attributed to the London B 76 Painter, an anonymous Athenian vase-painter active in the early Archaic period, and is now in the Musée des beaux-arts de Lyon (inventory E 581-c).

== History and provenance ==
The amphora was produced in Athens in the second quarter of the 6th century BC, during the early phase of Attic black-figure vase-painting. Its shape and decoration identify it as an Attic black-figure belly amphora of type B, a form used for both storage and display. The exact archaeological find-spot is unknown.

The amphora entered the collections of the Musée des beaux-arts de Lyon in 1923 as a gift from the industrialist Joseph Gillet. It is kept in the museum's Department of Antiquities under the inventory number E 581-c and is regularly used in educational programs on Greek myth and imagery.

== Description ==
The vase is 36 cm high with a maximum diameter of about 23.4 cm. It has two vertical handles and a broad, rounded body, with figural panels on both sides framed by bands of stylised floral ornament and tongues. The same decorative motifs are repeated around the shoulder and lip.

=== Face A: the Judgement of Paris ===
On side A the painter depicts the procession leading up to the Judgement of Paris. Three goddesses, Hera, Athena and Aphrodite, move in single file and are shown in profile, wearing long garments and himation cloaks. Each holds a circular object, often interpreted as a crown or wreath, in her hand. At the head of the group walks Hermes, identifiable by his beard, travel hat, staff and winged attributes, who guides the goddesses towards Paris. Paris stands facing them, holding a staff or sceptre. The figures are drawn as black silhouettes with details incised into the slip and with limited use of added colour for emphasis, typical of the black-figure technique.

=== Face B: duel of hoplites ===
Side B shows a combat scene between two heavily armed Greek hoplites. The warriors, advancing towards one another, carry round shields (aspides), spears and wear greaves and Corinthian helmets. The composition sets up a frontal confrontation framed by the same floral borders used on the mythological side. The juxtaposition of the peaceful procession on A with the violent duel on B echoes the role of the Judgement of Paris as the mythical origin of the Trojan War.

== Context ==
=== Amphorae and Attic pottery ===
The term amphora derives from the Greek amphi (“on both sides”) and phoros (“bearing” or “carrying”). It denotes a two-handled terracotta vessel designed for storing and transporting liquids such as wine and olive oil. Attic potters exported large quantities of such vases throughout the Mediterranean, where they served not only practical functions but also cultic and commemorative roles, particularly in Etruscan sanctuaries and tombs.

=== Black-figure technique ===
The amphora is decorated in the black-figure technique, in which figures and ornaments are painted as dark silhouettes on the natural red surface of the clay. Details such as facial features, hair and clothing folds are incised into the black slip, and additional colours, typically white and red, may be added for emphasis.

After the vessel had been formed on the potter's wheel and decorated, it was fired in a kiln using a three-stage process of oxidising, reducing and re-oxidising the atmosphere. This sequence turned the bare clay a reddish colour while fixing the painted slip as a glossy black layer, producing the characteristic two-tone effect seen on Attic black-figure vases.

=== The Judgement of Paris in vase painting ===
In Greek myth the Judgement of Paris explains the origins of the Trojan War: the Trojan prince Paris is asked to decide which of the goddesses Hera, Athena and Aphrodite is the most beautiful, and his choice in favour of Aphrodite leads ultimately to the abduction of Helen and the outbreak of war. The story was a popular subject in Archaic vase-painting, especially in Attica and in workshops producing vases for export to Etruria.

Thomas Carpenter has discussed the Lyon amphora as an early example of the iconography of the Judgement of Paris, contrasting its relatively static procession, with a beardless Paris and unarmed goddesses, to later compositions in which Paris is shown as a shepherd or archer and the goddesses are more individually characterised. The combination of the mythological scene on side A with a hoplite duel on side B illustrates the link often made in Archaic visual culture between heroic narratives and contemporary warfare.

== Bibliography ==
- Carpenter, Thomas H., Art and Myth in Ancient Greece. London: Thames & Hudson, 1991.
- Holtzmann, Bernard; Pasquier, Alain, Histoire de l’art antique : L’art grec. Paris: Presses Universitaires de France, 1998.
- Rouillard, Pierre; Verbanck-Piérard, Annie, Le vase grec et ses destins. Munich: Biering & Brinkmann, 1999.
- Vases en voyage, de la Grèce à l’Étrurie. Paris: Somogy Éditions d’art, 2001.
- Guide du département des antiquités. Lyon: Musée des Beaux-Arts de Lyon.
