= Domus Aurea (Antioch) =

Former church in Antioch

Great Church of Antioch
- Domus Aurea
- Country: Roman Empire
- Denomination: Church of Antioch

History
- Status: Cathedral
- Founder: Constantine the Great
- Dedication: Apostles

Architecture
- Style: Octagon

Clergy
- Bishop: Patriarch of Antioch

Domus Aurea (in English Golden House) or the Great Church in Antioch was the cathedral where the Patriarch of Antioch preached. It was one of the churches whose construction was started during the reign of Constantine the Great. It is thought to have been sited on an island where the Imperial Palace of Antioch used to stand during the Seleucid period.

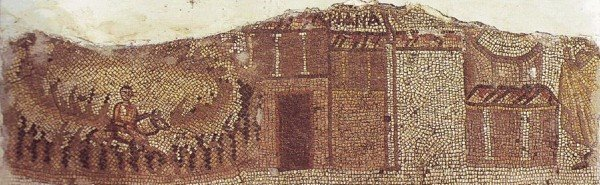
A possible depiction of the Great Church of Antioch (to the right) next to the Imperial Palace, from the border of the late 5th century Megalopsychia hunt mosaic, found in Daphne, near Antioch

The church became a major point of the controversy between Christians and Julian the Apostate when the latter closed the cathedral in response to the burning of an ancient temple of Apollo in the nearby suburb of Daphne. From 526 to 587 it suffered from a series of earthquakes, fires and Persian attacks, before being finally destroyed in another earthquake in 588, after which it was not rebuilt.

== Construction ==
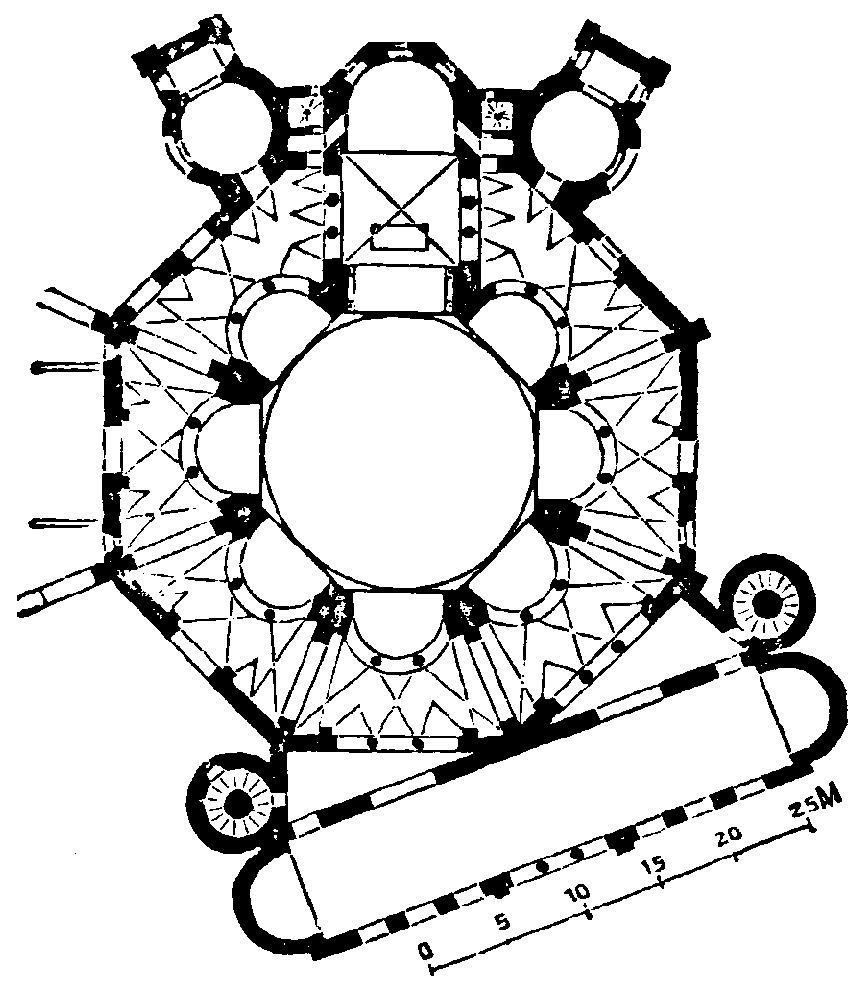
Ground plan of the Basilica of San Vitale, Ravenna, completed in 548, may indicate the form of the Domus Aurea

Construction of the church was started in 327, during the reign of Constantine the Great, and was completed under Constantius II. The new church was dedicated in a ceremony on 6 January 341, in the presence of both Constans and Constantius II and a gathering of ninety-seven bishops, which formed the dedication council. It was built on the island between the two main branches of the Orontes River, where the Imperial Palace was located. It has not proved possible to establish the site of the church with any greater certainty.

The only known possible depiction of the Domus Aurea is the Megalopsychia Hunt Mosaic, or "Yakto mosaic", from the second half of the fifth century, found in the ancient suburb of Antioch, Daphne (Yakto). Part of the border of this hunt scene shows buildings from Antioch, including those interpreted to be the Imperial Palace and the Domus Aurea. Although there is an octagonal building on part of the border it remains uncertain if this represents the great church or whether the relationship to other buildings can be used to identify its location on the island. In the absence of definitive pictorial evidence, it is necessary to rely on written descriptions of the building. Eusebius in his Life of Constantine, describes the Domus Aurea as being octagonal in plan, sited in a large enclosure, with many chambers clustered around it. The domed roof, which was made of wood, reached a great height and was gilded inside. The floor consisted of polished marble and every part of the building was highly decorated with brass, gold and precious stones. It has been proposed that it was similar in structure to the Basilica of San Vitale in Ravenna, which was built in 540.

== Julian the Apostate ==
Julian moved to Antioch in 362, soon after becoming the sole ruler of the eastern empire, following the death of Constantius II. He was the last non-Christian ruler of the Roman Empire, and chose Antioch as his headquarters, partly to lay plans for his proposed campaign against the Persians and partly to further his attempt to restore the eastern empire to Hellenism. He had the body of Saint Babylas removed from the martyrium near the temple of Apollo at Daphne, because he thought that it had silenced the oracle of Apollo. When the temple burned down, shortly thereafter, Julian was furious, suspecting the Christians and in response closed the Great Church, removing its liturgical vessels. This act effectively brought his attempts to restore Hellenism in Antioch to an end.

== Earthquakes and fires ==
The earthquake of late May 526 badly damaged the great church, but still left it standing. However, seven days later the fires that had been burning since the earthquake struck finally destroyed the church. The great church was rebuilt by Ephraim, the comes Orientis, and partly for that reason he was persuaded to become the new Patriarch of Antioch in 528. On 29 November 528 another earthquake struck the city and the great church was again destroyed. It was again rebuilt by Ephraim, being rededicated in 537/538, only for it to be destroyed by fire once more in 540 A.D. when Antioch was burned by the invading Persians under Chosroes I. It was rebuilt for the last time by Justinian I, but was damaged by earthquakes in 551, 557 and 577, giving a northward tilt to the dome.

== Destruction ==
The final destruction of the great church occurred on 31 October 588 (or possibly 587), when Antioch was again struck by a major earthquake. It is said that although the rest of the church was destroyed, that the dome settled on the ruins in an upright position. After this earthquake it appears that no attempt was made to reconstruct the great church. This is in keeping with indications that the area in which it stood had become mainly uninhabited by that time, because Antioch was no longer an imperial residence of the Eastern Roman/Byzantine Empire and the island was no longer enclosed by the city walls. After that, the church of Cassian became the patriarchal church of Antioch.

== See also ==
- Ancient Roman and Byzantine domes
- Symbolism of domes
