= Megalopsychia Hunt of Antioch mosaics =

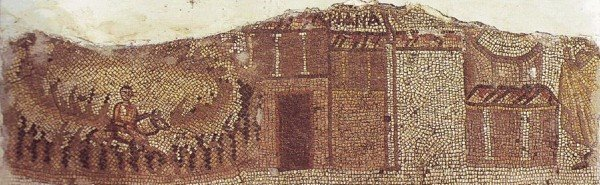
Megalopsychia mosaic border now in the Hatay Archaeology Museum.

The Megalopsychia Hunt of Antioch (Yakto mosaics) are two floor mosaics from the late fifth to early sixth century, part of a large group of mosaics known collectively as the Antioch mosaics. They were discovered at the ancient village of Yakto, near Daphne, a suburb of Antioch, near the modern city of Antakya, Turkey.

They are representative of the trait or virtue of megalopsychia, which has been interpreted to mean arrogance or the belief of superiority and being worthy of great things and respect.

One of the mosaics depicts a medallion with a woman holding a rose in one hand with scenes of animals attacking each other, then an outer ring surrounding it of six scenes of hunters taking down their prey. The mosaics are highly allegorical and carry deep symbolism that operates on multiple levels. One interpretation of these scenes is that they represent not only the strength of those depicted, but courage and the subjugation of the natural world by the ruler. It is a way of showing the assertion of order, bounty, and, above all, the victory or triumph of mankind over nature. Another interpretation would be that the female figure in the center is the representation of serenity of mind and logic, she is serene and undisturbed despite the violence surrounding her. The battles surrounding her show the various rises and falls of human society, the wars they wage, the victories won and the defeats suffered.

The other mosaic has a lead male figure in a hunting scene where he is killing a lion, with men and horses fighting animals around him. He remains detached in much the same way the female figure was in the other medallion. One is accepting the world around her and the other is subjugating it to his will, both are apparently unaffected by the actions happening around them because they are meant to be above it. This detachment of the mind and spirit from turmoil is part of the ideal behind the virtue of megalopsychia.
