= Judgement of Paris (mosaic) =

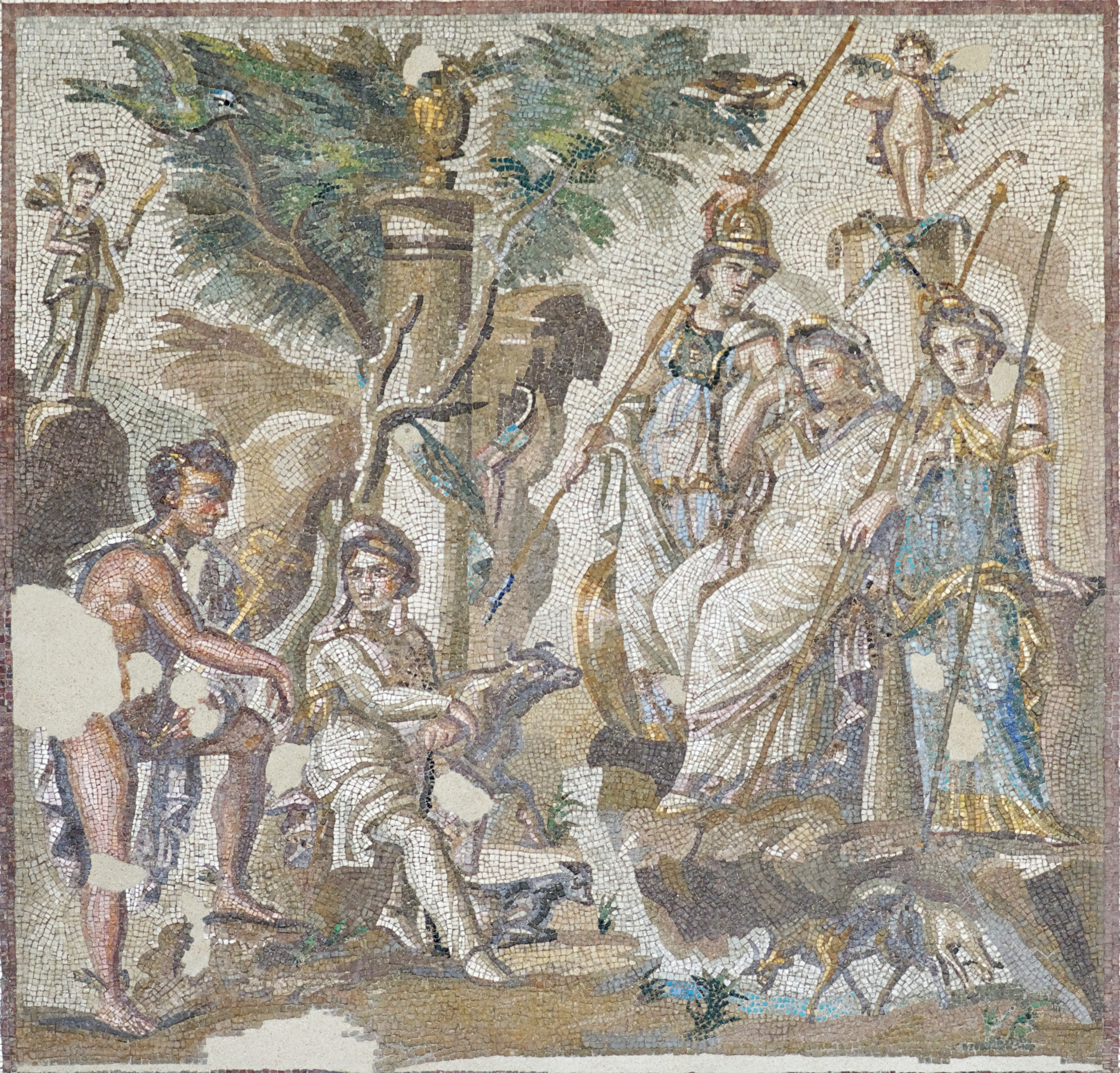
The Judgment of Paris (from the Atrium House triclinium in Antioch-on-the-Orontes (Turkey).) Note that this extract excludes the mosaic's elaborate floral frame.

The Judgement of Paris is the theme of a mosaic from the early second century AD, discovered in 1932 in Antioch. It is one of the most important mosaics from the ancient city, which was located a short distance from the site of modern Antakya (Antioch). The mosaic is normally housed in Paris at the Louvre (Ma 3443), although it has been known to go on tour. In 2007 it was scheduled to feature in an itinerant exhibition of important pieces that the Louvre organised in the United States.

The mosaic depicts the Judgement of Paris, one in a series of incidents which led to the Trojan War. Paris is shown seated in the middle of the scene, where he is required to determine which of the three goddesses, Hera, Athena or Aphrodite, is the most beautiful. The goddesses stand to the right. Over on the left Hermes watches: above him Psyche looks on from a rock, while on the right side, above and behind the divine contestants, Eros looks down from the top of an appropriately positioned pillar. The composition is framed with a rich floral pattern in which vine leaves feature prominently.

The mosaic is square in shape. The sides are 1,860 mm (73 in) long. Originally it was part of a large floor mosaic featuring five different images. It formed the floor of the dining room in a large atrium house. The Judgement of Paris was the central and largest image, with two others on each side. The other four are housed in other museums as follows:

- "The Drinking Contest of Hercules" (Worcester Art Museum)
- "Aphrodite and Adonis (The Art Museum, Princeton University)
- "Dancing Maenad" (Baltimore Museum of Art)
- "Dancing Satyr" (Baltimore Museum of Art)

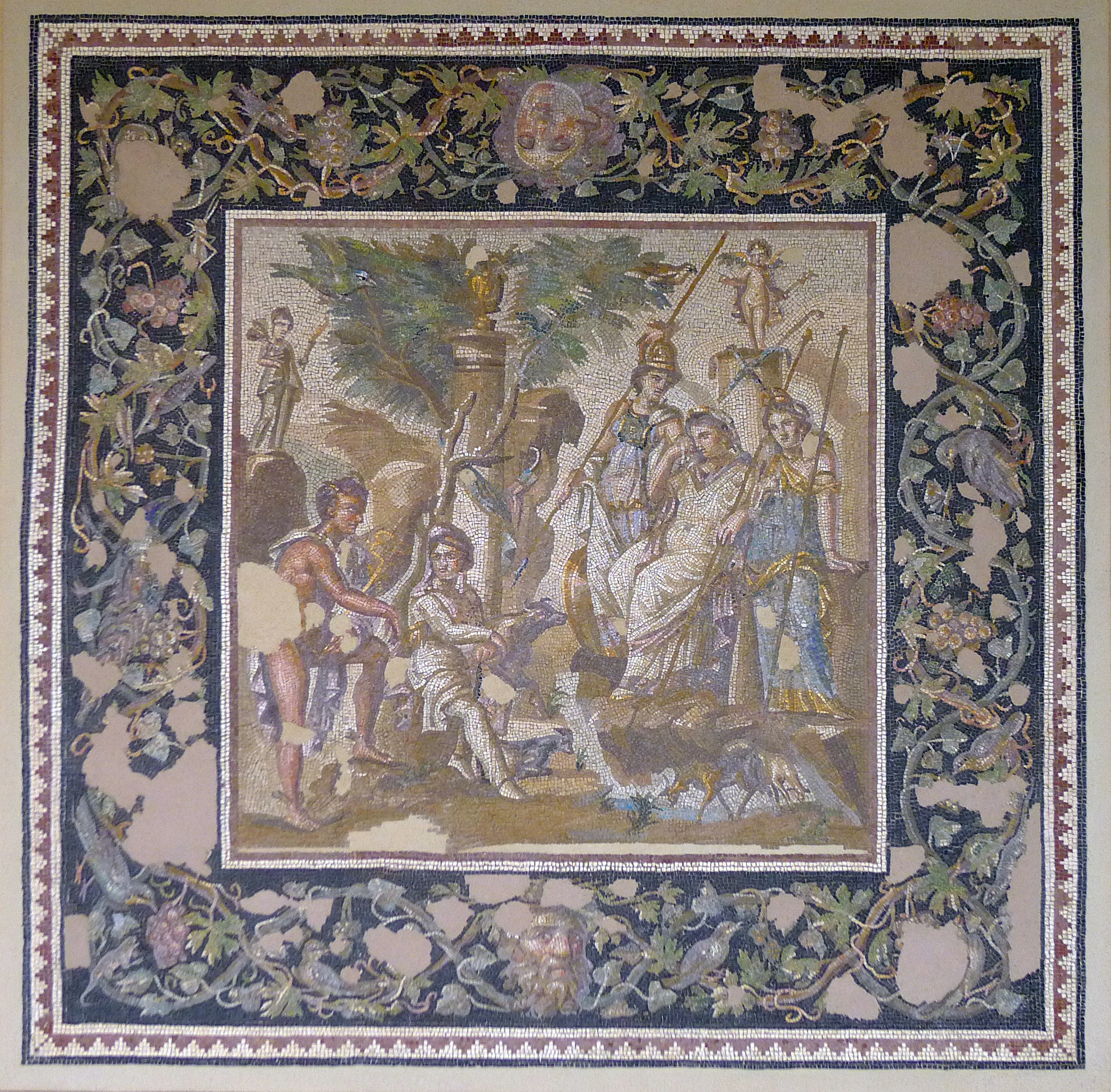

The archeologist-scholar Doro Levi saw a certain impressionistic effect in the work, especially in respect of the interplay between the light and the shadows.

"The Judgment of Paris" was a popular theme in antiquity. Around six examples have been identified among the wall paintings at Pompeii. Only two other surviving mosaic depictions have been found, however. These are on Kos and at Casariche in Spain.
