= Diocese of the East =

Division of the late Roman Empire

Diocese of the East Dioecesis Orientis Ἑῴα Διοίκησις
- Diocese of the Roman Empire and Byzantine Empire
- 314–535/536
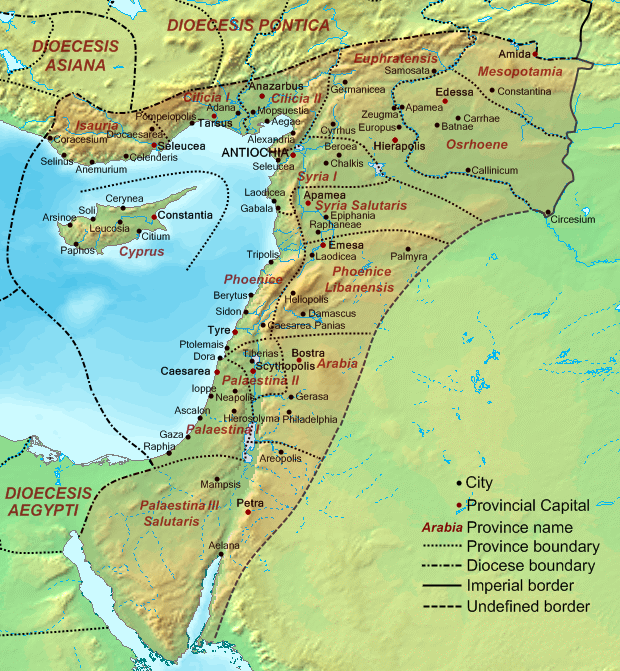
- The Diocese of the East c. 400
- Capital: Antioch
- Historical era: Late Antiquity
  - Established: 314
  - Diocese abolished by Justinian I: 535 or 536
Succeeded by
Al-Jazira (caliphal province)
Bilad al-Sham
Roman Cyprus
Roman Isauria

The Diocese of the East, also called the Diocese of Oriens (Latin: Dioecesis Orientis; Greek: Διοίκησις Ἑῴα), was a diocese of the later Roman Empire and Byzantine Empire, incorporating the provinces of the western Middle East, between the Mediterranean Sea and Mesopotamia. During Late Antiquity and the period of late antique Syria, it was one of the major commercial, agricultural, religious and intellectual areas of the empire, and its strategic location facing the Sassanid Empire and the nomadic tribes gave it exceptional military importance.

== History ==
The capital of the diocese was at Antioch, and its governor had the special title of comes Orientis ("Count of the East", of the rank vir spectabilis and later vir gloriosus) instead of the ordinary "vicarius". The diocese was established after the reforms of Diocletian (r. 284–305), and was subordinate to the praetorian prefecture of the East.

The diocese included originally all Middle Eastern provinces of the Empire: Isauria, Cilicia, Cyprus, Euphratensis, Mesopotamia, Osroene, Syria Coele, Phoenice, Syria Palaestina, Arabia, and the Egyptian provinces Aegyptus, Augustamnica, Thebais, Libya Superior and Libya Inferior, which were grouped into the separate Diocese of Egypt under Valens (r. 364–378). During the course of the 4th century, several provinces were split, resulting in the new provinces of Cilicia I and Cilicia II, Syria I and Syria II Salutaris, Phoenice I and Phoenice II Libanensis (east of Mt. Lebanon), Palaestina I, Palaestina II and Palaestina Salutaris (or Palaestina III). The last creation of a new province dated to the reign of Justinian I (r. 527–565), when Theodorias, the region around Laodicea, was split off from Syria I. At about the same time, Cyprus was split off and became part of a new super-province, the quaestura exercitus.

In 535, as part of his administrative reforms, Justinian I abolished the diocese, and the comes Orientis became the provincial governor of Syria I, while retaining his previous rank of vir spectabilis and his salary.

The entire area of the former diocese came under Sassanid Persian occupation in the 610s and 620s, during the Byzantine–Sassanid War of 602–628. Shortly after the Byzantine victory in the war and the recovery of the region, it was again lost, this time permanently, to the Muslims, with the exception of Cilicia and most of the Levantine coasts later reconquered: by the 640s, Cilicia formed the border (Al-Awasim) between Byzantium and the new Arab Rashidun Caliphate and its successors, while Cyprus became a disputed territory. From the old provinces of the Diocese of the East, only Isauria and parts of the two Cilicias remained under Byzantine rule, grouped under the new Anatolic Theme.

== List of Comites Orientis ==
Names and dates are taken from the Prosopography of the Later Roman Empire. Dates given are those in which the comites are known to have held office, but not necessarily when they started or ended their terms.

- 335: Flavius Felicianus
- 335?/337: Ianuarius
- 330/336: Quintus Flavius Maesius Egnatius Lollianus
- 340: Archelaeus
- c. 340/341: Marcus Maecius Memmius Furius Baburius Caecilianus Placidus
- 342 April 5: Vulcacius Rufinus
- 349 April 6: Leontius
- 349 October 3: Marcellinus
- 353–354: Honoratus
- 354–358: Nebridius
- 358–362 February 4: Domitius Modestus
- 362 August 28–363 February 23: Iulianus
- 363 October 22–364: Aradius Rufinus
- 364 April 17: Iulianus
- After 364: Domitius
- 364/375: Gaius Valerius Eusebius
- 370/374: Eutolmius Tatianus
- 380 July 8: Felix
- 381 March 31: Tuscianus
- 381 July 19: Glycerius
- 382 September 20: Philagrius
- 383 March 8–384: Proculus
- 384–385: Icarius
- 385?/6: Pergamius
- 386 April 30: Clearchus
- 386: Deinias
- 387: Unknown
- 391?/392: Palladius
- 392 November 10: Martinianus
- c. 393: Romulianus
- 393: Lucianus
- 393 December 30: Infantius
- 396: Archelaus
- 396 April 24: Claudianus
- 397 November 1–398 February 14: Asterius
- Early/mid 5th century: Eleutherius
- Early/mid 5th century (after 437?): Iulius Agrius Tarrutenius Marcianus
- Early/mid 5th century: Unknown
- Before 433: Callistus
- Before 433: Memnonius
- Before 433: Zoilus
- 435 January 29: Abthartius
- 445: Sallustius
- 446/447: Dionysius
- Mid 5th century: Archelaus
- 5th/6th century: Auxitius
- c. 489?/490: Theodorus
- c. 494: Calliopius
- 494: Constantius
- 507: Basilius
- 507: Procopius
- 507: Irenaeus Pentadiastes
- 513/518: Unknown
- 518: Irenaeus
- Before 522: Theodotus
- 522/523–524/525: Ephraemius
- 525: Anatolius
- 526: Ephraemius
- 527: Zacharias
- 527: Patricius
- 542: Lazarus
- 560/561: Zemarchus
- Mid 6th century: Unknown
- ?6th century: Fl... th...
- c. 579: Unknown
- 587/588: Asterius
- 587/588: Ioannes
- 588/589: Bacchus
- 609–610: Bonosus

== See also ==
- Arabia in late antiquity
- Late antique Egypt
- Late antique literature

== Sources ==
- Bury, John Bagnell (1958) [1923]. History of the Later Roman Empire: From the Death of Theodosius I to the Death of Justinian, Volume 2. Mineola, New York: Dover Publications. OCLC 41478187.
- Martindale, John R.; Jones, A. H. M.; Morris, John, eds. (1971). The Prosopography of the Later Roman Empire: Volume I, AD 260–395. Cambridge: Cambridge University Press. ISBN 0-521-07233-6.
- Martindale, John R., ed. (1980). The Prosopography of the Later Roman Empire: Volume II, AD 395–527. Cambridge: Cambridge University Press. ISBN 0-521-20159-4.
- Martindale, John R., ed. (1992). The Prosopography of the Later Roman Empire: Volume III, AD 527–641. Cambridge: Cambridge University Press. ISBN 0-521-20160-8.
