= Philagrius =

Philagrius or Philagrios may refer to:

- Philagrius (prefect of Egypt), Roman governor of Egypt in 335–337 and 338–340
- Philagrius (comes Orientis)
- Philagrius of Epirus
- Philagrios, a co-editor of Philogelos
- Hieromartyr Philagrius of Cyprus, an East Orthodox saint
