= Late antique Syria =

History of Syria in late antiquity

Late antique Syria was the history of Syria and its neighboring lands in the eastern Mediterranean between the later Roman Empire and the early Islamic period, roughly from the fourth to the eighth centuries. In this period, Syria formed one of the most urbanized and culturally diverse regions of the eastern Roman world. Its cities, countryside, monasteries, churches, schools, and pilgrimage centers connected the Mediterranean with Mesopotamia, Armenia, Arabia, and Iran.

The region was not a single political or cultural unit. In Roman and Byzantine administrative usage, "Syria" could refer to several provinces, including Syria Prima, Syria Secunda, Euphratensis, Phoenice Libanensis, and territories adjacent to Osrhoene, Mesopotamia, and Arabia Petraea. Greek remained the dominant language of civic, administrative, and elite literary culture in much of western Syria, while varieties of Aramaic remained widely spoken and Syriac became an increasingly prestigious literary, liturgical, and theological language.

Late antique Syria was marked by continuity and transformation. Antioch remained one of the major cities of the eastern Mediterranean, but the region also saw the rise of powerful rural settlements, monasteries, saints' cults, and Syriac Christian institutions. From the sixth century, earthquakes, plague, Sasanian invasions, and internal ecclesiastical divisions reshaped the region. The Muslim conquest in the 630s did not uniformly destroy late antique society, but it changed the political framework, redirected patronage, and accelerated older transformations in urban form, religious authority, and regional economy.

== Scope and terminology ==
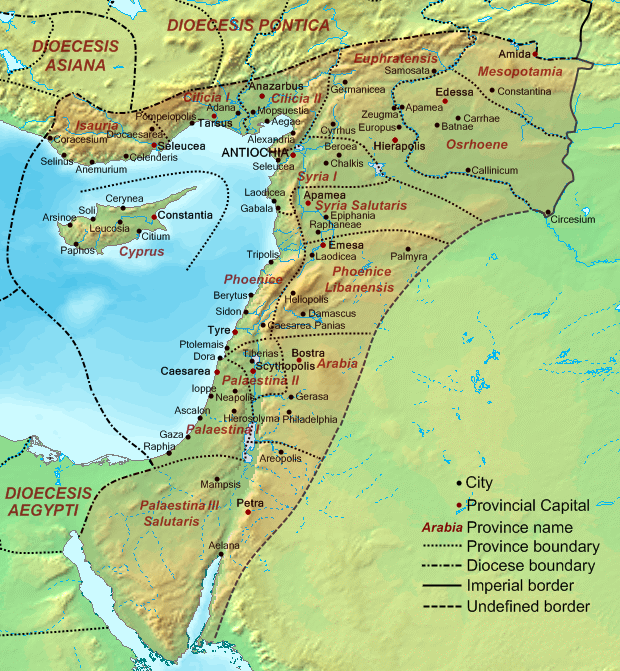
The Roman Diocese of the East around 400, showing the administrative divisions of Syria and neighboring regions

The expression "late antique Syria" is used by modern historians for a broad cultural and historical zone rather than for a single province. Its boundaries varied according to whether one is discussing Roman administration, Syriac Christianity, Antiochene urban culture, the limestone villages of northern Syria, the Euphrates frontier, or the wider lands of Bilad al-Sham under early Islam. The term can include areas now in modern Syria, Turkey, Lebanon, Jordan, Israel, and Palestine, although individual studies often focus on narrower regions such as Antioch and its hinterland, northern Syria, the Hauran, or the Syrian steppe.

Late antiquity in Syria is often dated from the fourth century, when Christianity acquired public and imperial prominence, to the eighth century, when the region had been incorporated into the Umayyad Caliphate and then into the early Abbasid Caliphate. These chronological limits are approximate. Some developments, such as the emergence of Syriac literature and the rise of Christian asceticism, began earlier, while other late antique patterns continued under Islamic rule.

== Historical setting ==
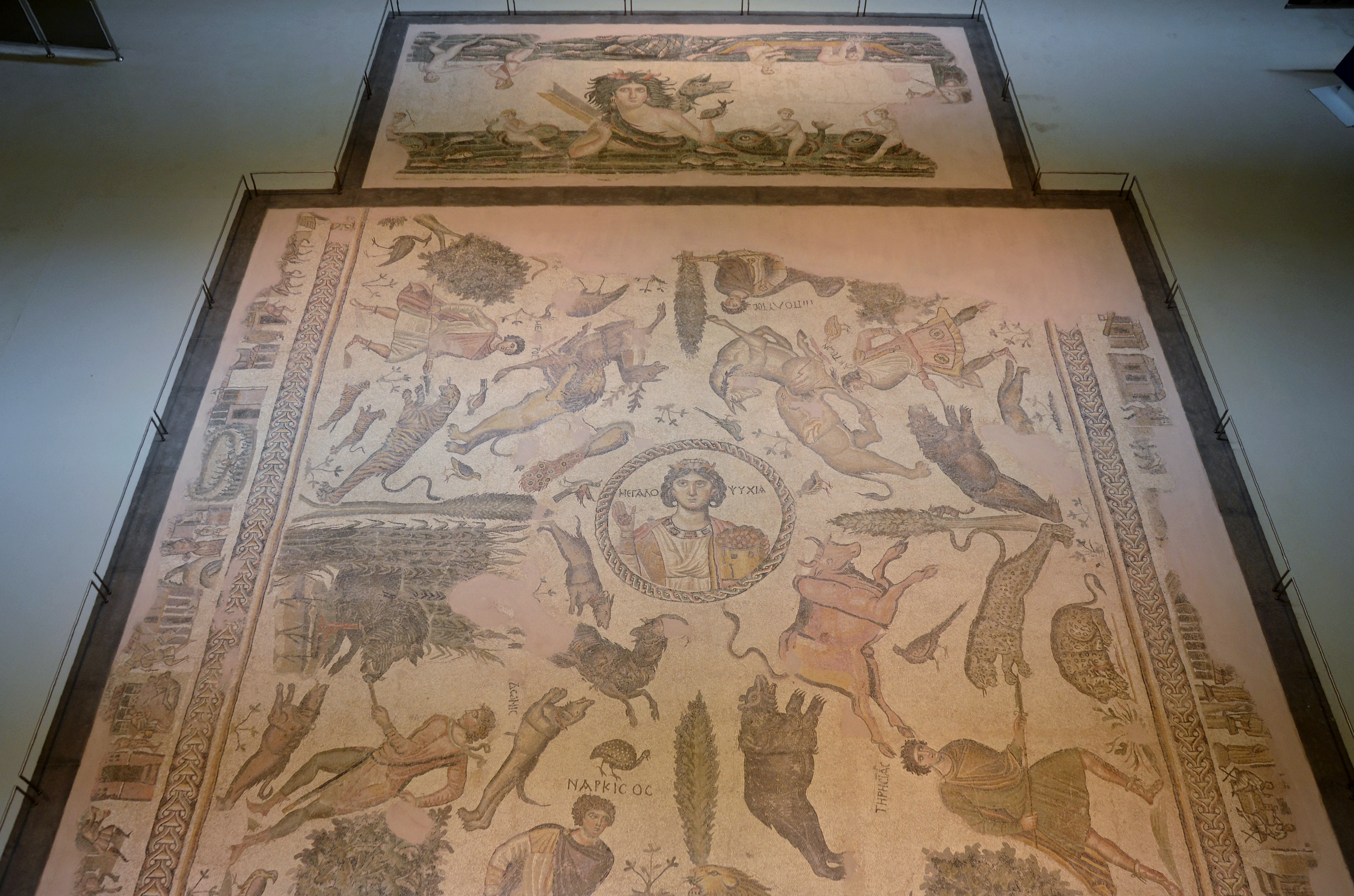
The late fifth-century Megalopsychia Hunt mosaic, discovered at Yakto near Antioch

Syria had long been one of the central regions of the Roman East. Antioch, founded in the Hellenistic period and later incorporated into the Roman Empire, became a major administrative, military, and cultural center. The region's roads, river valleys, ports, and frontier routes linked the Mediterranean coast with the Orontes valley, the Euphrates, Mesopotamia, and Arabia.

In the fourth and fifth centuries, Syria remained closely tied to the imperial government. Antioch was an occasional imperial residence, a center of rhetoric and law, and a city of administrators, merchants, scholars, and Christian congregations. The city and its territory also formed a major setting for debates about Christian identity, Judaism, Greek civic culture, and the relationship between religious affiliation and social life.

The sixth century brought both prosperity and crisis. Some cities and rural districts continued to build churches, houses, monasteries, and public works, while Antioch and other cities suffered earthquakes, plague, Persian attacks, and fiscal strain. The Sasanian occupation of Syria in the early seventh century and the subsequent Byzantine recovery were followed within a few years by the Muslim conquest, which transferred Syria from Roman rule to an Islamic state.

== Cities and urban life ==
=== Antioch ===
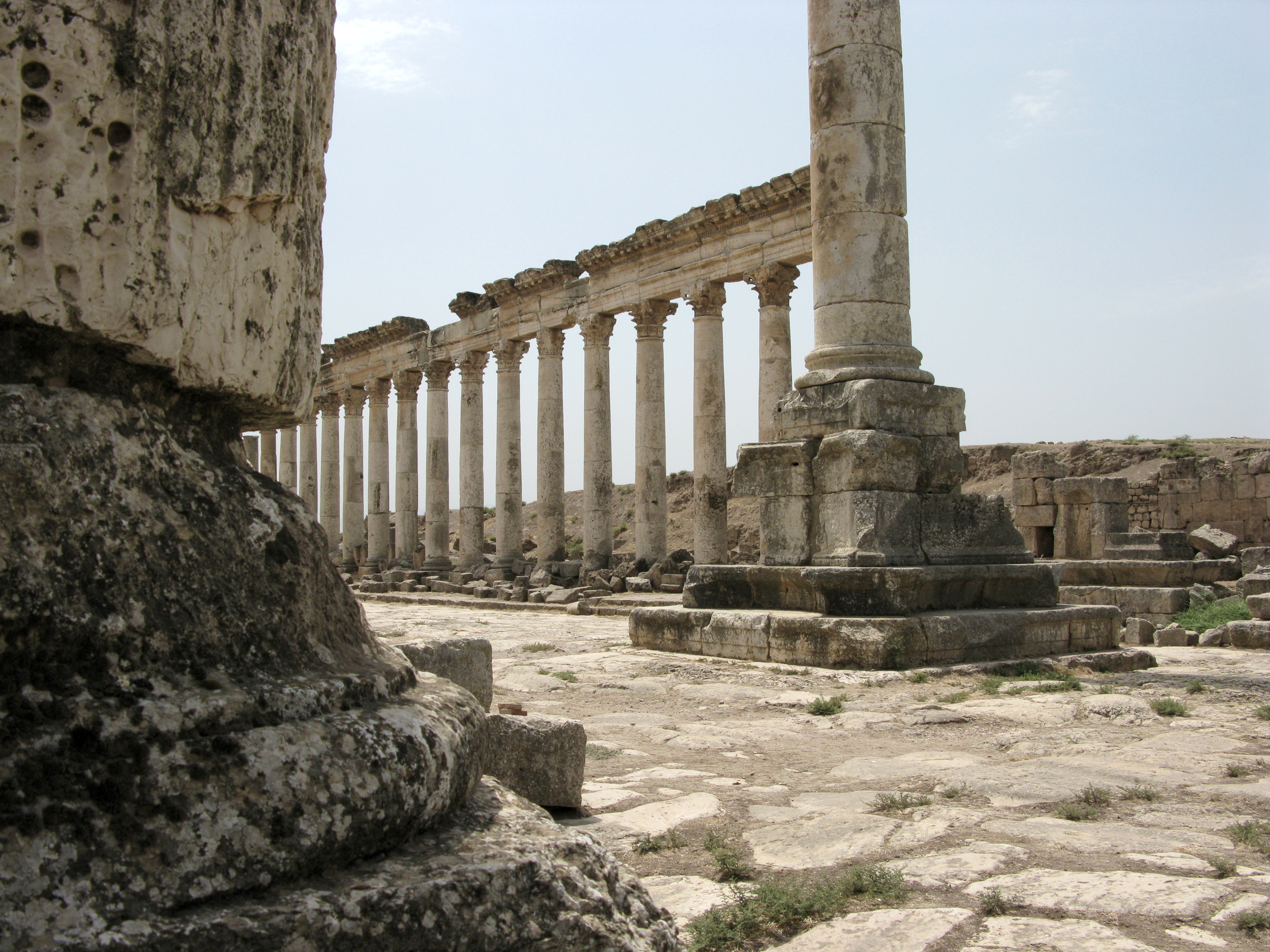
The Great Colonnade of Apamea, part of the inherited Roman monumental landscape of late antique Syria

Antioch was the principal city of late antique Syria and one of the largest cities of the Roman East. Its importance derived from its administrative functions, elite educational culture, Christian institutions, and location between the Mediterranean, northern Syria, and Mesopotamia. In the fourth century, it was associated with figures such as Libanius and John Chrysostom, whose writings show the coexistence of classical education, Christian preaching, Jewish communities, civic ceremony, and religious competition.

The late antique city contained monumental streets, baths, churches, elite houses, suburban villas, and pilgrimage sites. Yet Antioch's urban fabric was repeatedly damaged in the sixth century. Earthquakes in the 520s, the Persian sack of 540, later Persian attacks, and plague all affected the city. Archaeological evidence suggests that Antioch did not simply vanish, but its classical monumental form was increasingly replaced by smaller structures, reused spaces, and altered street patterns.

=== Urban transformation ===
Hugh Kennedy argued that the transformation from the classical polis to the early Islamic madina was not a single consequence of the Muslim conquest, but a long process that began in late antiquity. In Syrian cities, theatres, gymnasia, and large public baths declined before or around the time of the conquests, while streets and market areas gradually changed from open colonnaded spaces into narrower, more enclosed commercial zones. Mosques became important new public buildings under Islam, but many other changes in urban layout, public patronage, and commercial space had late antique roots.

The pace of change differed by city. Antioch and Apamea had lost much of their old classical monumentality before or soon after the seventh century, whereas Bostra and some southern settlements show stronger continuity into the Umayyad period. Foss concluded that the Arab conquest itself left little direct archaeological trace in many areas; older disasters, regional conditions, and later eighth- and ninth-century changes were often more visible archaeologically than the events of the 630s.

== Countryside and villages ==
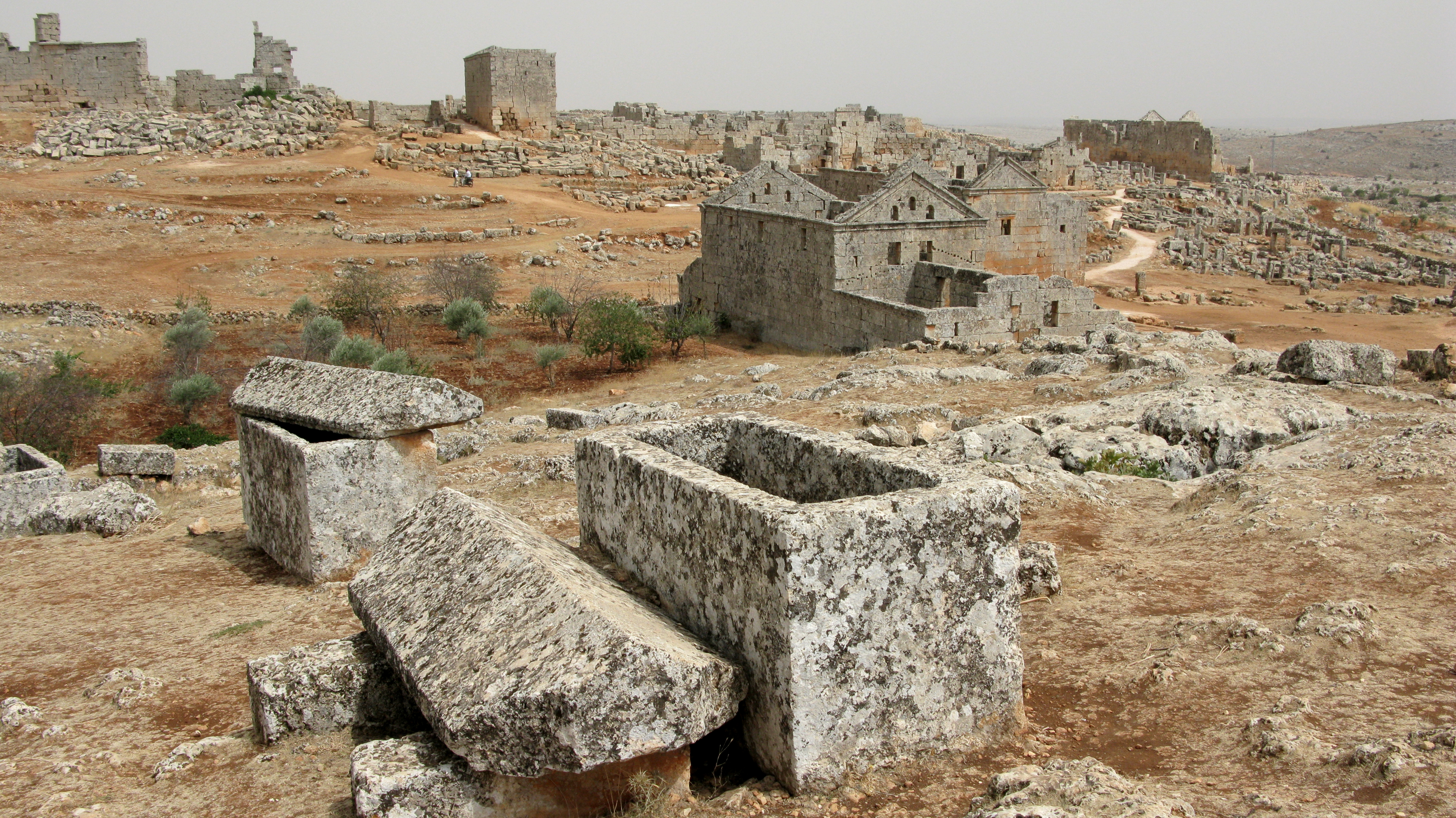
Serjilla, one of the well-preserved late antique villages of the limestone hills of northern Syria

One of the distinctive features of late antique Syria was the prosperity of many rural settlements, especially in northern Syria. The limestone hills east of Antioch and Apamea preserve large numbers of villages, farmhouses, churches, monasteries, and communal buildings. These settlements have often been called the "Dead Cities", although modern scholarship generally treats them as evidence for a once-densely settled and economically active countryside rather than as isolated ruins.

The rural economy was not based only on subsistence agriculture. Archaeological work has connected these villages with olive cultivation, animal husbandry, stone-built domestic architecture, craft production, and exchanges with nearby cities. The scale and quality of domestic and ecclesiastical architecture suggest that many inland Syrian peasants were not uniformly impoverished, and that late antique rural Syria differed from older models of a declining or crushed peasantry.

Rural prosperity did not continue unchanged. In several areas, domestic building seems to have slowed or stopped around the middle of the sixth century, while churches and monasteries continued to be built into the later sixth and early seventh centuries. Foss's study of Dehes and other northern Syrian sites suggests a period of stagnation and deterioration rather than immediate abandonment: people remained in old houses, reused spaces, repaired buildings more roughly, and continued economic activity into the seventh century.

== Languages and literary culture ==
Late antique Syria was multilingual. Greek was the principal written language of Roman administration, high literary culture, public inscriptions, rhetoric, and much urban communication west of the Euphrates. Latin had a more limited role, especially in the army and law, while Aramaic dialects remained widely spoken across Syria and Mesopotamia.

Syriac, the Edessene literary dialect of Aramaic, became increasingly important in late antiquity. Taylor emphasizes that Syriac was not identical with every local Aramaic dialect of Syria, but became a high-status literary and religious language whose geographical range expanded over time. Brock similarly treats late antique Syriac culture as deeply engaged with Greek, through translation, loanwords, biblical interpretation, hymnography, and literary exchange.

The relationship between Greek and Syriac was not simply one of replacement. Greek remained prestigious in administration and elite education, while Syriac gained prestige through Christianity, liturgy, poetry, exegesis, and theological writing. Some authors wrote in Greek, some in Syriac, some translated between the two, and many Christian texts associated with Greek-speaking authors survived in Syriac translation.

== Education and communication ==
The urban elite in the fourth century carried on the tradition of classical education. The sophist Libanius taught rhetoric in Antioch and maintained an extensive network of students, families, officials, and former pupils. His school illustrates the continued prestige of Greek rhetoric, literary training, and elite social connections in late Roman Syria.

Christian preaching created another form of public communication. John Chrysostom's sermons in Antioch show how Christian teachers addressed mixed urban congregations and attempted to shape everyday behavior, religious boundaries, and communal identity.

Education and preaching overlapped with broader questions of identity. Sandwell's study of Chrysostom and Libanius argues that religious categories such as "Christian", "Jew", and "Greek" were actively constructed in late antique Antioch rather than simply given social facts. Chrysostom pressed for sharp religious boundaries, while Libanius often used religious allegiance in more situational and strategic ways.

== Religious communities ==
Late antique Syria contained Christians, Jews, adherents of traditional Greco-Roman cults, Manichaeans, Marcionites, and other religious groups. Christianity became increasingly public and institutionally powerful from the fourth century onward, but Christianization was uneven and involved negotiation, polemic, shared practices, and local variation.

Antioch had important Jewish communities, and Jewish-Christian interaction was a major feature of late antique religious life. Chrysostom's anti-Jewish homilies reflect anxieties about Christians attending Jewish festivals, seeking healing from Jewish specialists, and crossing religious boundaries that Christian leaders wanted to harden. Kennedy and Liebeschuetz argue that Christian-Jewish antagonism intensified in Antioch from the fourth century, even though Jews continued to possess communal institutions and remained part of the city's social world.

The region was also shaped by Christological controversy. After the Council of Chalcedon in 451, Syria became a central arena of conflict between Chalcedonian and non-Chalcedonian Christians. The non-Chalcedonian movement was strong among monks and Syriac-speaking communities. Menze argues that theological disagreement, in addition to historical and institutional processes, from the fifth and sixth centuries led to the emergence of the Syrian Orthodox Church. Many groups played a role in creating this new and independent ecclesiastical structure: exiled non-Chalcedonian bishops, monastic networks, liturgy, sacraments, commemoration of persecuted leaders, and new clerical ordinations.

== Asceticism, saints, and pilgrimage ==
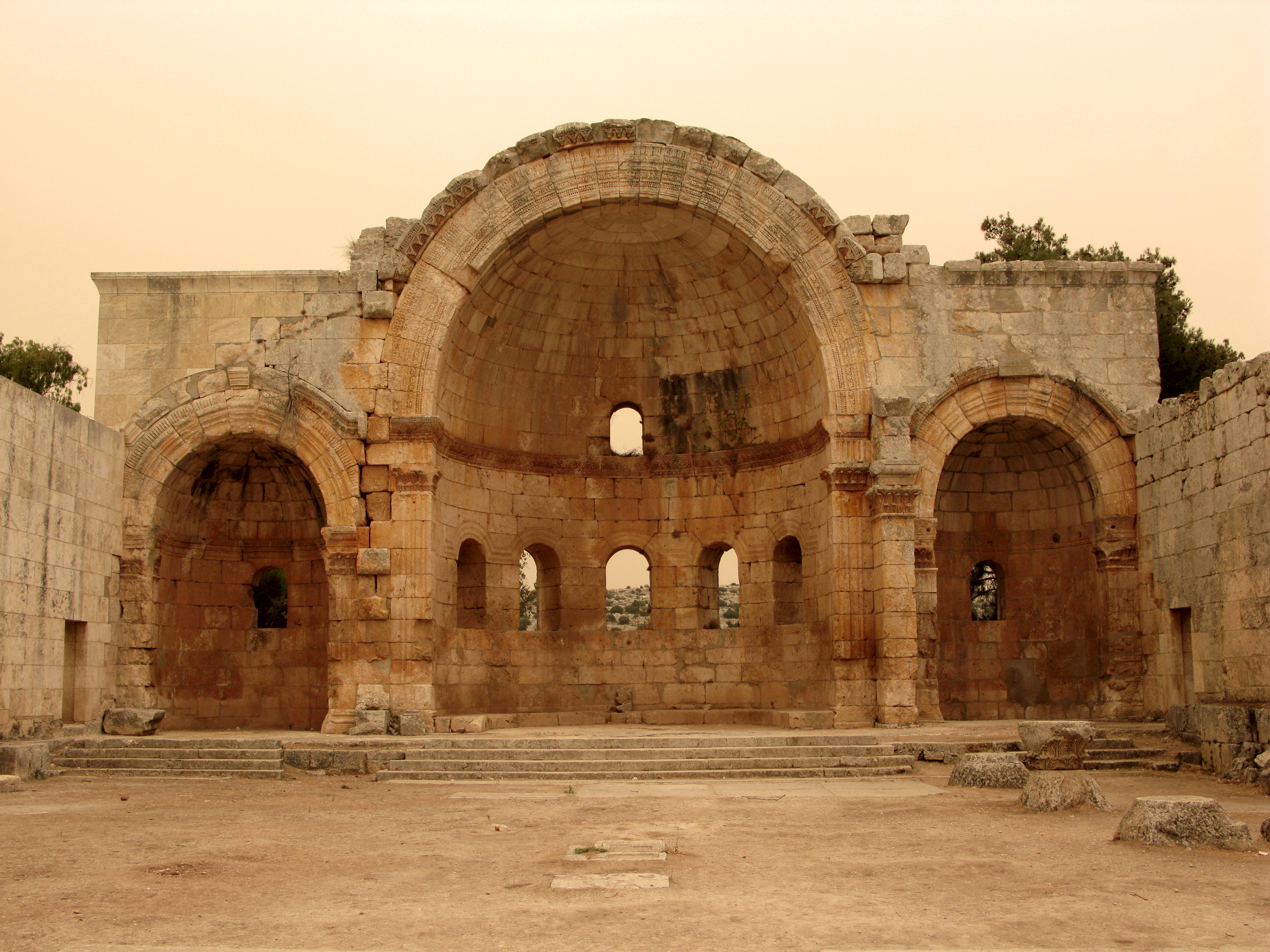
The fifth-century pilgrimage complex of Saint Simeon Stylites at Qal'at Sim'an

Syria was famous for ascetics and holy men. The most prominent were the stylites, monks who lived on pillars, including Symeon Stylites the Elder and Symeon Stylites the Younger. Their cults drew pilgrims, inspired monumental building, and connected rural monasteries with urban and imperial society. The sanctuary around the pillar of Symeon the Elder at Qal'at Sim'an introduced new monumentality into the northern Syrian countryside.

Holy men were not only religious specialists but also social actors. They mediated disputes, preached repentance, criticized wealth, and became symbols through which communities interpreted disaster and divine punishment. Parker's study of Symeon Stylites the Younger shows how hagiography from the Antiochene region responded to earthquakes, plague, Persian invasion, social tension, and the problem of whether a saint could protect his community in times of crisis.

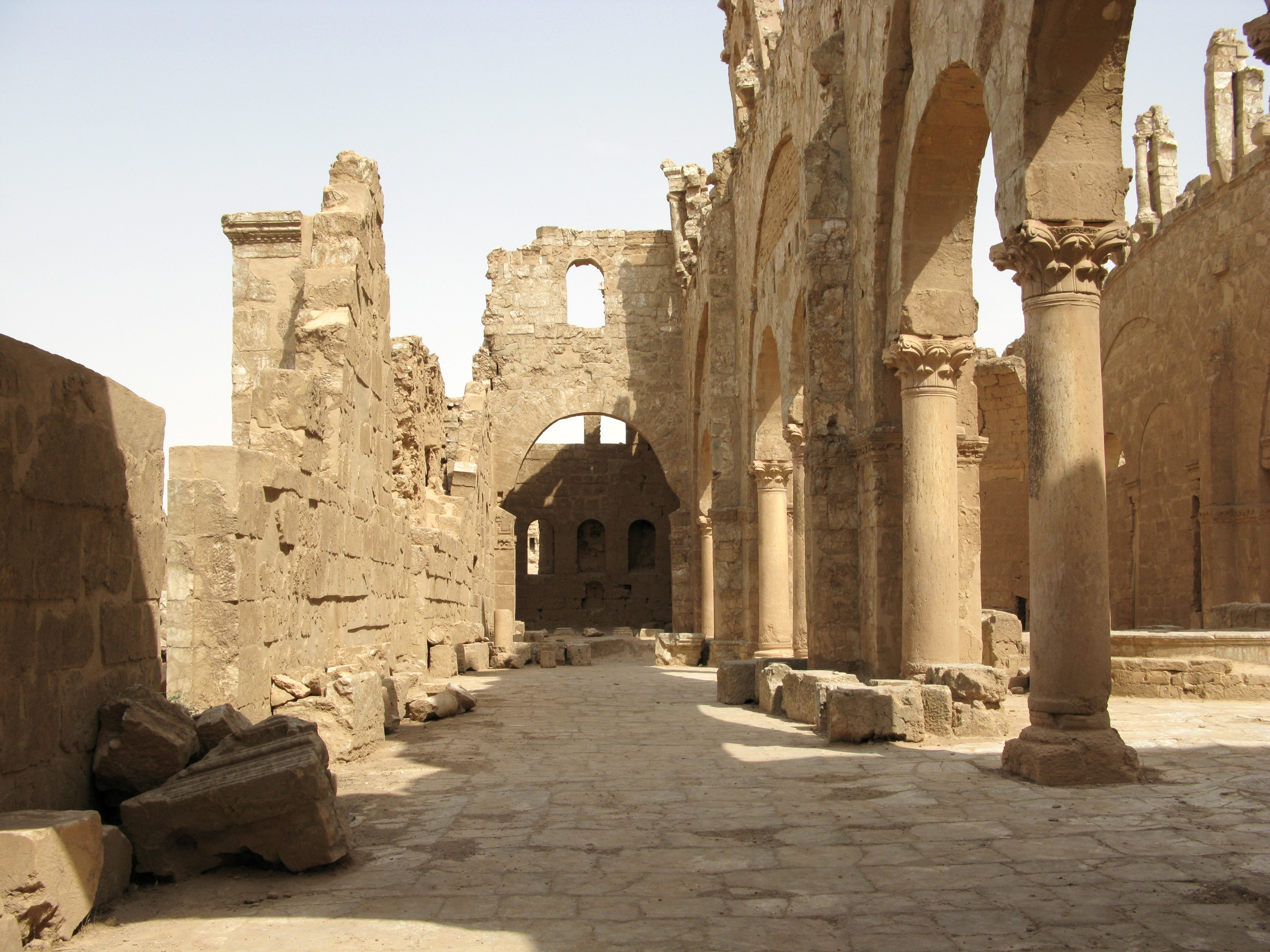
The basilica at Resafa, or Sergiopolis, an important pilgrimage center on the Euphrates frontier

Pilgrimage also linked Syria to wider late antique religious geography. These include shrines of figure like Qal'at Sim'an and SergiopolisRusafa which gained attention from locals, imperial authorities, and communities on the empire's frontiers. The frontier groups linked to these shrines could, in turn, serve religious, economic, diplomatic and other functions with groups beyond the frontiers, such as the Sasanian Empire or the many groups inhabiting late antique Arabai.

== Crisis and war ==
Sixth-century Syria experienced repeated natural and military disasters. For example, the great city of Antioch was struck by major earthquakes, including the disasters of 526 and 528, and was sacked by the Sasanian ruler Khosrow I in 540. The Justinian plague that began in the 540s also affected Syria and became part of late antique interpretations of crisis, punishment, and the limits of saintly intercession.

The Sasanian wars of the early seventh century were more disruptive still. Persian occupation, Byzantine reconquest, and the loss of the region to the early caliphate followed in rapid succession. Foss argues that the material record does not show a uniform collapse at the moment of conquest; rather, different parts of Syria were affected in different ways. Northern cities such as Antioch and Apamea had already been heavily transformed, while southern sites such as Bostra and rural districts of the Hauran show considerable continuity into the Umayyad period.

== Early Islamic transition ==
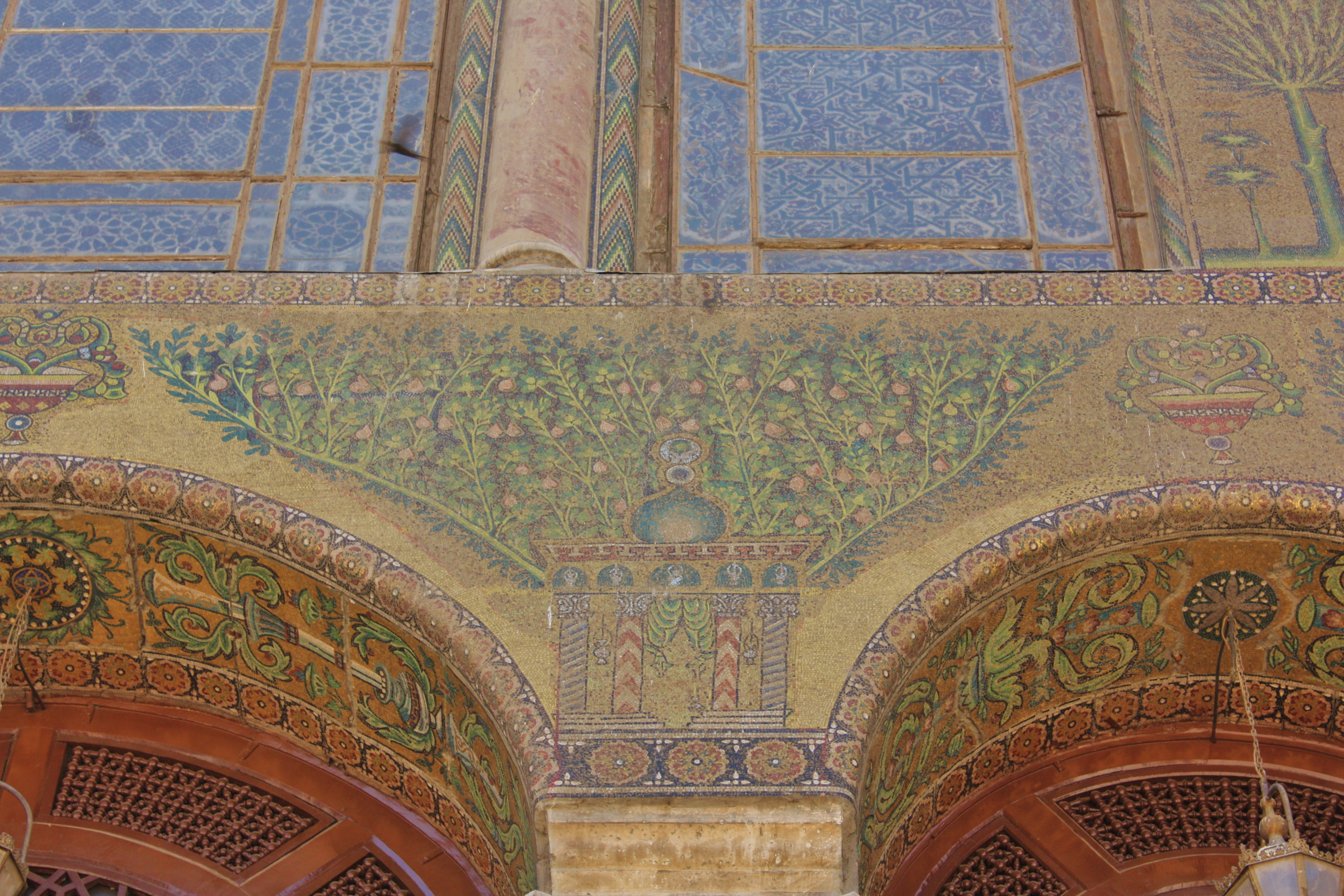
Early eighth-century mosaics in the Umayyad Mosque of Damascus

The Muslim conquest of Syria in the 630s altered political sovereignty and tied Syria to the emerging Islamic state. Damascus became the capital of the Umayyad caliphs, and Syria became a central region of the early caliphate. In urban space, mosques appeared as new public buildings and gradually took over some civic, judicial, educational, and ceremonial functions previously associated with other buildings and institutions.

At the same time, many late antique structures persisted. Churches continued to function in several areas, Christian communities remained numerous, and some villages and towns continued to be occupied through the Umayyad period. In some places, Christian and Muslim institutions stood side by side; in others, older churches were transformed, abandoned, or incorporated into new urban arrangements.

The transition was therefore uneven. The Umayyad period brought new patronage, administrative structures, coinage, mosques, elite residences, and desert complexes, but it did not erase the late antique inheritance. In many areas, the most decisive breaks in settlement and material culture came later, especially after the end of Umayyad rule, the Abbasid shift of political gravity to Iraq, earthquakes, rural insecurity, and changes in regional trade.

== See also ==
- Arabia in late antiquity
- Late antique Egypt
- Later Roman Empire
- Roman Syria
- Byzantine Syria
- Antioch
- Syriac Christianity
- Syrian Orthodox Church
- History of the Jews in Syria
- Muslim conquest of the Levant
- Umayyad Caliphate
- Resafa
- Dead Cities

== Bibliography ==
- Brock, Sebastian P. (1999). From Ephrem to Romanos: Interactions between Syriac and Greek in Late Antiquity. Aldershot: Ashgate. ISBN 9780860788003.
- Cribiore, Raffaella (2007). The School of Libanius in Late Antique Antioch. Princeton: Princeton University Press. ISBN 9780691128245.
- De Giorgi, Andrea U.; Eger, A. Asa (2021). Antioch: A History. London: Routledge. ISBN 9781138845244.
- Drijvers, Han J. W. (1994). History and Religion in Late Antique Syria. Aldershot: Ashgate. ISBN 9780860784517.
- Foss, Clive (1997). "Syria in Transition, A.D. 550-750: An Archaeological Approach". Dumbarton Oaks Papers. 51: 189–269. JSTOR 1291765.
- Kennedy, Hugh (1985). "From Polis to Madina: Urban Change in Late Antique and Early Islamic Syria". Past & Present (106): 3–27. JSTOR 650637.
- Kennedy, Hugh; Liebeschuetz, J. H. W. G. (1988). "Antioch and the Villages of Northern Syria in the Fifth and Sixth Centuries A.D.: Trends and Problems". Nottingham Medieval Studies. 32: 65–90.
- Maxwell, Jaclyn L. (2006). Christianization and Communication in Late Antiquity: John Chrysostom and his Congregation in Antioch. Cambridge: Cambridge University Press. ISBN 9780521860406.
- Menze, Volker-Lorenz (2008). Justinian and the Making of the Syrian Orthodox Church. Oxford: Oxford University Press. ISBN 9780199534876.
- Parker, Lucy (2022). Symeon Stylites the Younger and Late Antique Antioch: From Hagiography to History. Oxford: Oxford University Press. ISBN 9780192865175.
- Sandwell, Isabella (2007). Religious Identity in Late Antiquity: Greeks, Jews and Christians in Antioch. Cambridge: Cambridge University Press. ISBN 9780521879156.
- Shepardson, Christine (2014). Controlling Contested Places: Late Antique Antioch and the Spatial Politics of Religious Controversy. Berkeley: University of California Press. ISBN 9780520286214.
- Taylor, David G. K. (2002). "Bilingualism and Diglossia in Late Antique Syria and Mesopotamia". In Adams, J. N.; Janse, Mark; Swain, Simon (eds.). Bilingualism in Ancient Society: Language Contact and the Written Word. Oxford: Oxford University Press. pp. 298–331. ISBN 9780199245062.
