= Late antique literature =

Literary production in the Mediterranean and Near East during late antiquity

Late antique literature is the body of literary, scholarly, and religious writing produced during late antiquity, commonly from the mid-third to the early seventh centuries CE. It includes works in Greek and Latin, but also in Syriac, Coptic, Armenian, Georgian, Middle Persian, Arabic, and other languages of the Roman, Sasanian, and post-Roman worlds. In broader scholarly usage, the field may also include legal, technical, epigraphic, school, and paraliterary texts when these are studied as literary forms or as part of the textual culture of the period. Moving away from prior prejudices, recent scholarship treats the literature of this period as reflecting religious and intellectual transformations, exchanges across languages, and a period of massive literary production.

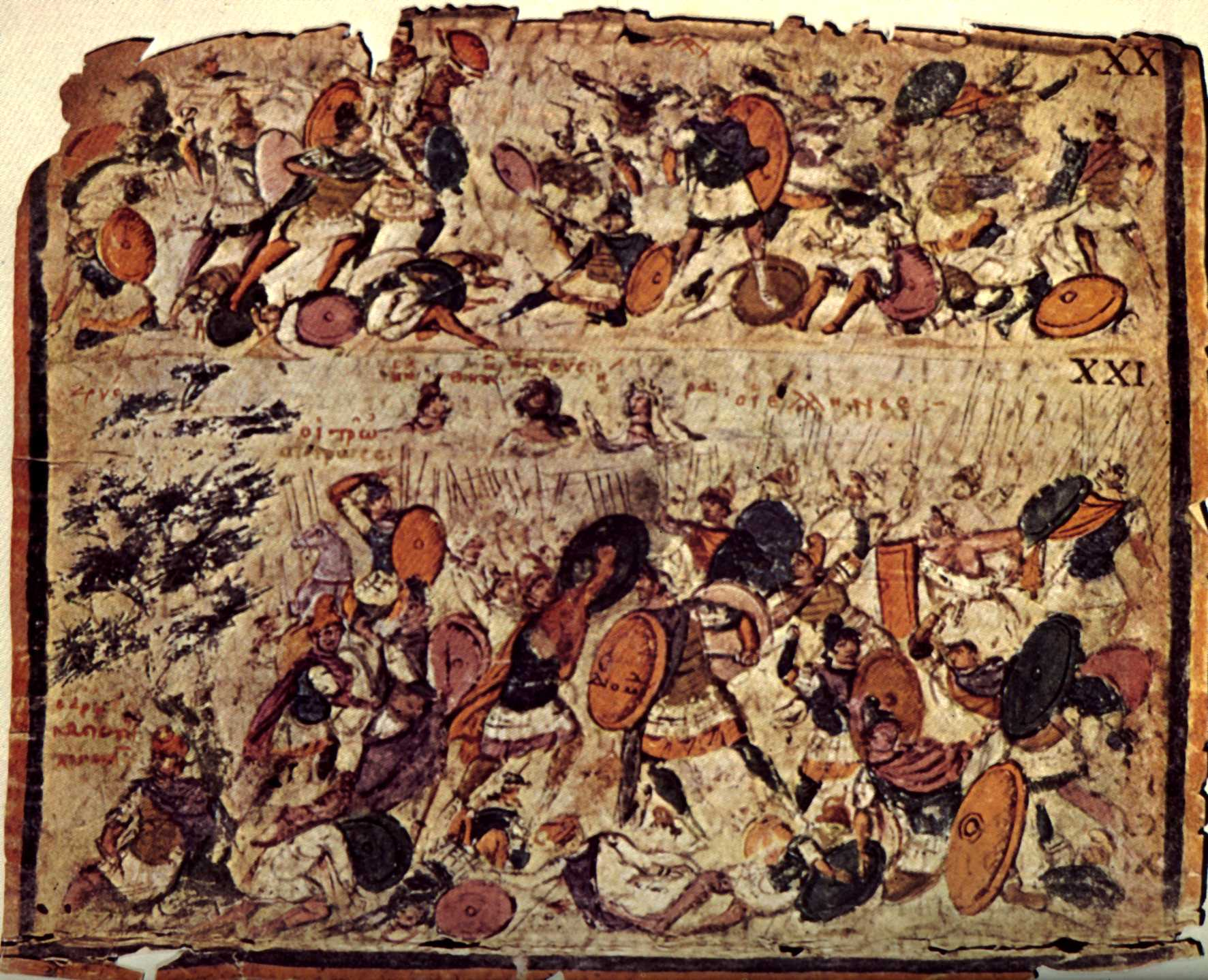
Battle scenes from the fifth-century Ambrosian Iliad, an illustrated Greek manuscript of Homer.

The surviving literature of late antiquity is exceptionally varied. It includes poetry, panegyric, sermons, letters, chronicles, histories, biblical commentary, theological treatises, hagiography, travel writing, law, school texts, handbooks, epitomes, florilegia, inscriptions, and translations. The period also saw the emergence or consolidation of several Christian literary cultures, the continued cultivation of classical education, the textualization of religious authority, and the movement of works across linguistic boundaries through translation and adaptation. Biblical traditions also circulated across Jewish, Christian, and Muslim communities.

== Scope and chronology ==
Late antique literature is usually studied within the wider period of late antiquity, a periodization more recently introduced into historiography and popularized in Peter Brown's book The World of Late Antiquity (1971). The era of "Late Antiquity" ranges from the political, religious, and cultural changes of the third century to the first half of the seventh century, although the endpoint varies by region and language. Greek and Latin works are central to this area, but the concept of late antique literature has expanded to include the literary cultures of Syria, Egypt, Armenia, Georgia, Iran, and the Arabian Peninsula, where literary traditions developed in relation to the major religious and intellectual traditions of the region.

The field is therefore not only a late extension of classical literature. While many authors maintained classical forms and rhetorical education continued to be important, late antique writers innovated the functions of older genres, developed new styles of writing, and used their texts to define communities, authority, memory, and sacred history.

== Languages and literary cultures ==
=== Greek ===
Greek retained enormous prestige in late antiquity as a language of empire, education, philosophy, theology, intellectual exchange, and literary display. In the eastern Roman Empire, a Greek rhetorical education remained a principal route to elite status. Greek literary production included classicizing history, poetry, philosophical commentary, ecclesiastical history, biblical exegesis, letters, hagiography, and miracle collections. Greek writings were translated into numerous languages including Latin, Syriac, Coptic, Armenian, Georgian, Ethiopic, Arabic, and others.

Late antique Greek authors often combined classical literary forms with Christian subject matter. The poetry of Nonnus and his circle, the hymnic tradition associated with Romanos the Melodist, the historical works of Procopius, Agathias, and Theophylact Simocatta, and the theological writings of the Greek fathers all show the continuing vitality of Greek literary culture after the classical period.

=== Latin ===
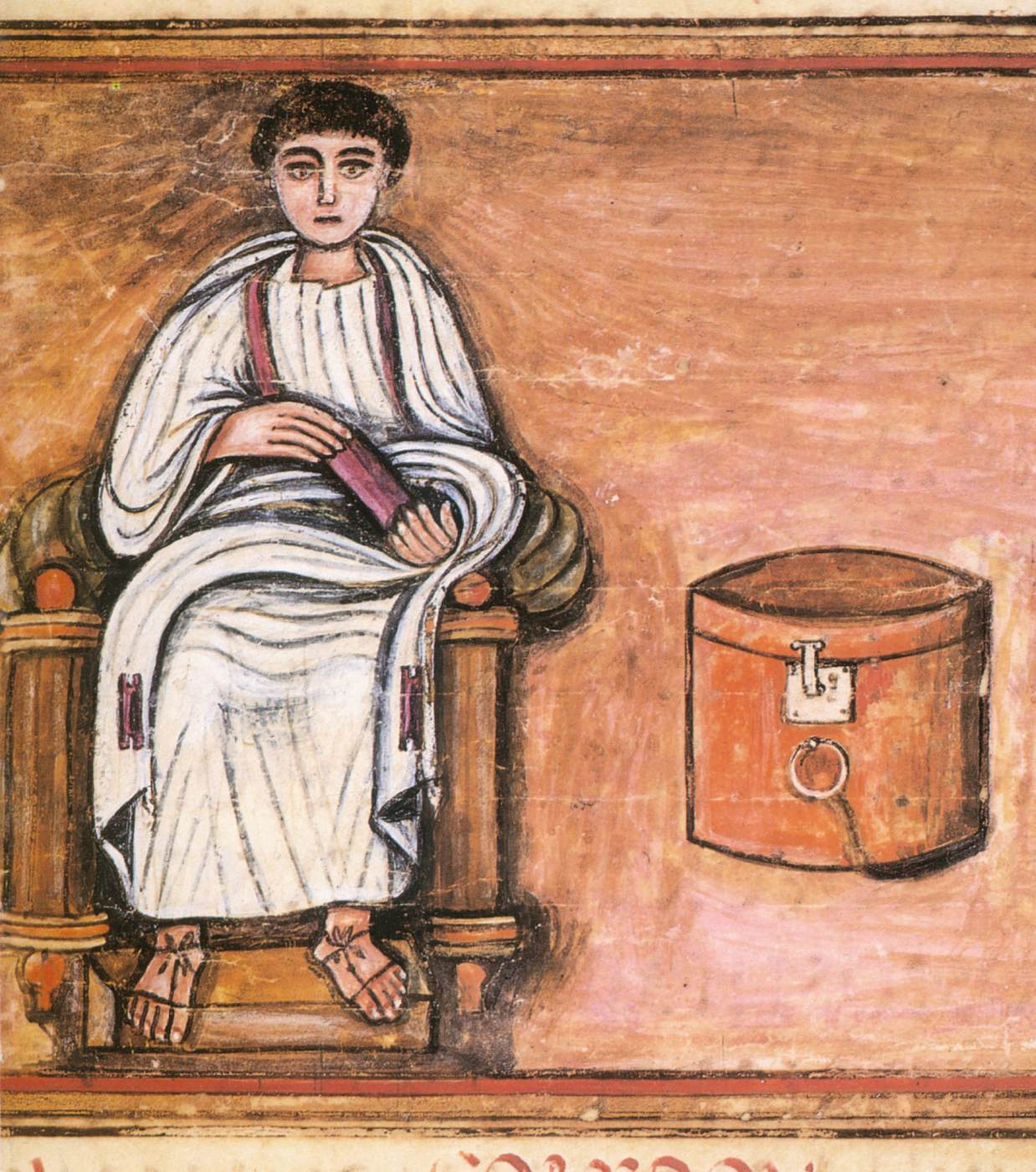
A page from the Vergilius Romanus, a fifth-century illustrated manuscript of Virgil.

Between the fourth and the sixth centuries, Latin literature underwent a substantial transformation under the trends of the growth of Christianity, the evolution of how imperial power was organized and wielded, and the formation of post-Roman states in Western Europe. Genres reserved for the elite, like panegyric, epigram, historiography, and didactic literature continued, but were complemented by religious forms including Christian sermons, biblical poetry, hagiography, theological treatises, and episcopal letters, all of which became central to Latin literary culture.

The period produced major Latin authors such as Ambrose, Augustine, Jerome, Prudentius, Claudian, Paulinus of Nola, Sidonius Apollinaris, Boethius, Cassiodorus, Venantius Fortunatus, and Gregory of Tours. Late antique Latin also saw changes in poetic technique and sound, including greater use of accentual verse and rhyme alongside inherited classical meters.

=== Syriac ===
Syriac literature flourished especially in Christian communities east of the Euphrates and in the borderlands between the Roman and Sasanian empires. Its surviving late antique corpus is overwhelmingly Christian and includes biblical commentary, homilies, theological prose, hagiography, hymns, and metrical verse. Ephrem the Syrian was a foundational figure in Syriac literary culture: his prose commentaries and especially his hymns established models for biblical interpretation, doctrinal teaching, and poetic theology.

Syriac poetry developed distinctive stanzaic and metrical forms, including the madrashe and memre. Jacob of Serugh and Narsai composed memre on biblical and ecclesiastical themes. Philoxenus of Mabbug and the author of the Book of Steps (Liber graduum) used prose treatise, letter, and paraenesis for Christological and ascetic instruction.

=== Coptic ===
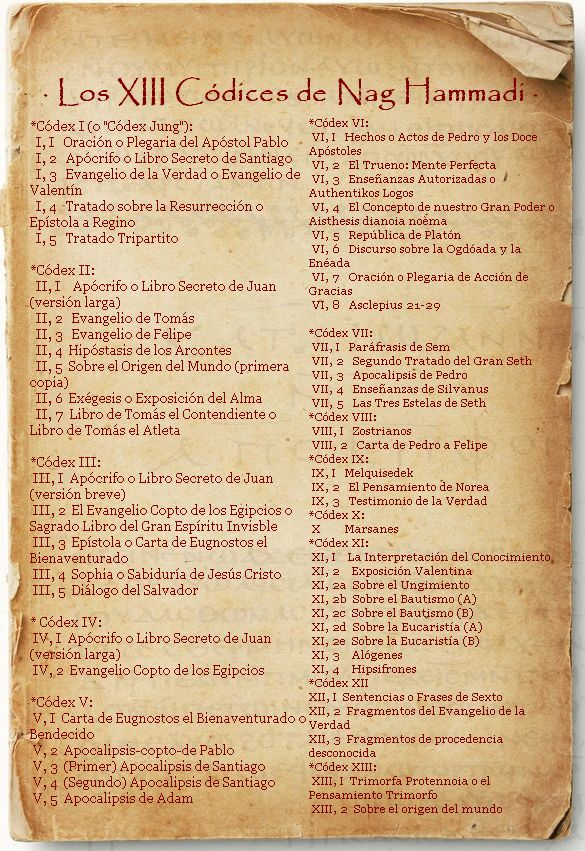
The thirteen codices of the Nag Hammadi library, copied in Coptic.

Coptic literature emerged in late antique Egypt from the interaction of Egyptian, Greek, and Christian cultures. Coptic, the final stage of the Egyptian language, was written mainly in the Greek alphabet with additional Egyptian signs, and its literature includes translations from Greek as well as original works. The surviving corpus is largely religious: biblical translations, monastic rules and letters, sermons, hagiography, Manichaean texts, and the writings associated with Nag Hammadi and the White Monastery.

The most important Coptic author of late antiquity was Shenoute, the abbot of the White Monastery, whose sermons, letters, and monastic regulations show Coptic as a language of complex rhetoric, discipline, and ecclesiastical controversy. The fragmentary survival of Coptic manuscripts makes the reconstruction of this literary culture especially dependent on codicology, manuscript finds, and the study of monastic libraries.

=== Armenian and Georgian ===
Armenian and Georgian literary cultures developed in close connection with Christianization, the creation of written scripts, and Bible and religious translations. Armenian literature was shaped by the invention of the Armenian alphabet by Mesrop Mashtots in the late fourth to early fifth century. In addition, the translation of the Bible and the production of apologetic, historical, and theological prose also played a major contribution in shaping its literature. Histories attributed to or associated with the historian Agathangelos, the Buzandaran or Pseudo-Faustus, Elishe, Ghazar Parpetsi, and later Sebeos used narrative history to explain Christian identity, noble patronage, and conflict with the Persian Sasanian Empire.

Georgian literature likewise developed as part of a Christian Caucasus where local culure interacted with Iranian and Byzantine influences. Early Georgian writing included translations of scripture and hagiography. The Passion of Shushanik was a famous work of early Georgian hagiography. In later times, the traditions entering The Georgian Chronicles had a significant impact on Georgian kingship and memory.

=== Middle Persian ===
Middle Persian, or Pahlavi, survives in later manuscripts after the late antique period; however, many of these traditions were transmitted directly from Sasanian and early post-Sasanian worlds. Pahlavi writing included inscriptions, commentaries on the Avesta, apocalyptic and debate texts, wisdom literature, geographical and epic material, and substantial legal literature such as the Madiyan i Hazar Dadestan.

Manichaean Middle Persian texts also formed part of late antique Iranian literary culture. They include Mani's Shabuhragan, fragmentary hagiographic and martyrological material, and sermons or addresses associated with later Manichaean figure-heads.

=== Rabbinic Hebrew and Aramaic ===
Rabbinic literature was central to late antique Jewish textual culture. Its principal corpora include the Mishnah, Tosefta, halakhic midrashim, the Palestinian or Jerusalem Talmud, the Babylonian Talmud, aggadic midrashim, targums, and piyyutim. These corpora used Hebrew and Aramaic in major Palestinian and Babylonian rabbinic settings, though later aggadic, paytanic, and targumic creativity was especially Palestinian. Mishnaic Hebrew was the language of the tannaitic and amoraic sages in Palestine and Babylonia; tannaitic literature was redacted roughly between 70 and 250 CE, while amoraic literature extended from the late third century to around 500 CE. Hebrew remained a spoken language in Palestine until about 200 CE, but later amoraic literature was formed in environments where Jewish Palestinian Aramaic and Jewish Babylonian Aramaic were major languages of speech and learned discourse.

The Mishnah, traditionally associated with Judah ha-Nasi ("Judah the Prince") around the beginning of the third century, was the first major rabbinic compilation of legal material and was organized by subject rather than as a biblical commentary. The Tosefta, a parallel and supplementary tannaitic legal collection, is closely related to the Mishnah but was edited after it, probably between the mid-third and fourth centuries. Halakhic midrash, by contrast, presented legal interpretation in the form of scriptural exegesis; its major collections cover much of Exodus through Deuteronomy and originated in Palestine, probably toward the end of the tannaitic period, while preserving earlier rabbinic material.

The two Talmuds continued the interpretation of the Mishnah and other tannaitic traditions in different regional forms. The Palestinian Talmud was produced in the rabbinic academies of Palestine in the third and fourth centuries, probably in Tiberias, and combines Hebrew with Galilean Aramaic; it includes Mishnah commentary, legal decisions, baraitot, halakhic midrash, and non-legal material. The Babylonian Talmud was composed by rabbis in Sasanian Babylonia from the third to the sixth or seventh centuries, and is more encyclopedic in character than the Palestinian Talmud, preserving legal argument, narrative, scriptural interpretation, medical and magical traditions, folk material, and other genres. Later Palestinian rabbinic creativity also produced aggadic midrash, synagogue poetry, and targumic traditions; Shinan links this material especially to the synagogue and house of study, and emphasizes the importance of oral performance and transmission in its development.

=== Arabian languages and the Quran ===
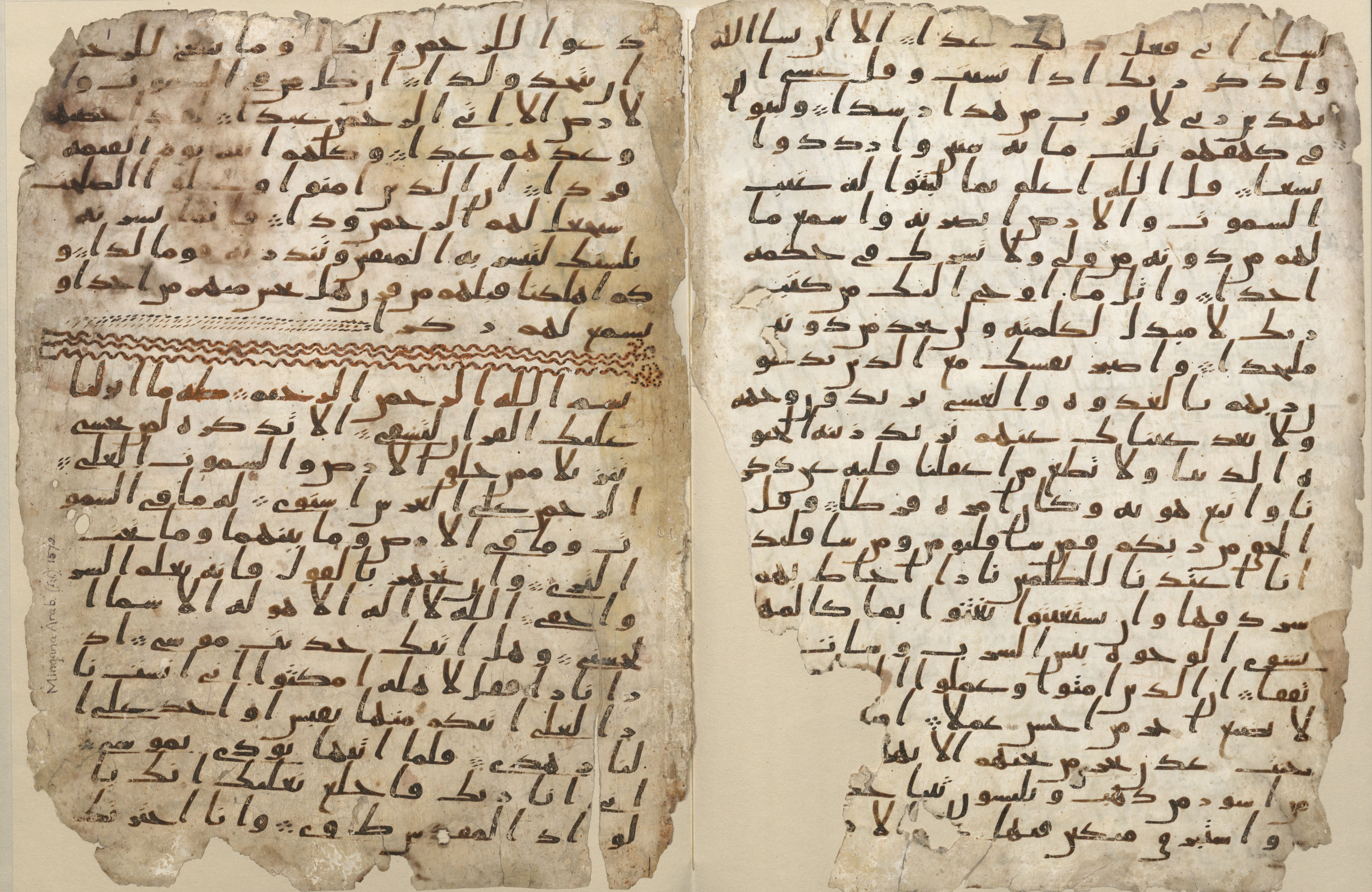
The Birmingham Quran manuscript, written in an early Arabic script on parchment.

Arabia in late antiquity was linguistically heterogeneous: Ancient South Arabian, Ancient North Arabian, and Old Arabic are attested in inscriptions and graffiti. Old Arabic was written first in a late Nabataean Aramaic script. Early and pre-Islamic Arabic poetry and prose are known mainly through their survival in later transmitted works. The Quran is the earliest surviving book in Arabic and the most impactful piece of literature work to emerge from late antique Arabia.

Scholars such as Angelika Neuwirth and Kevin van Bladel have studied the Quran within the religious and literary world of late antiquity, especially in relation to biblical, parabiblical, liturgical, and apocalyptic traditions known across the Near East. This approach treats the Quran as a late antique text without reducing it to its Jewish or Christian antecedents.

== Literary institutions and transmission ==
Late antique literary production depended heavily on schools, libraries, scribes, readers, and systems of patronage. Classical rhetorical education remained important, especially in Greek and Latin cities, where literary competence was tied to public office, elite identity, and social mobility. Grammatical, rhetorical, and philosophical training shaped not only poems and histories but also letters, panegyrics, commentaries, legal texts, and sermons. At the same time, Christian and other religious communities developed new settings and networks for textual production, preservation, and exchange.

Translation was a major practice in late antique textual culture. Greek works were translated into Syriac, Coptic, Armenian, Georgian, Latin, and Arabic, while biblical and theological texts circulated in multiple versions. Translation could transmit texts, but it could also transform them by adapting vocabulary, doctrine, style, and genre to new audiences.

Late antique books also circulated in excerpted and reorganized forms. Epitomes, handbooks, florilegia, scholia, catenae, and commentaries helped readers master large textual traditions and made older literature usable in new educational, religious, and scholarly contexts.

== Literary institutions and transmission ==
Late antique literary production depended heavily on schools, libraries, scribes, readers, and systems of patronage. Classical rhetorical education remained important, especially in Greek and Latin cities where literary competence was tied to public office, elite identity, and social upward mobility. Grammatical, rhetorical, and philosophical training shaped not only poems and histories but also letters, panegyrics, commentaries, legal texts, and sermons. At the same time, Christian and other religious communities developed new settings and networks for textual production, preservation, and exchange.

Translation was a major practice in late antique textual culture. Greek works were translated into Syriac, Coptic, Armenian, Georgian, Latin, and Arabic, while biblical and theological texts circulated in multiple versions. Translation could transmit texts, but it could also transform them by adapting vocabulary, doctrine, style, and genre to new audiences.

Late antique books also circulated in excerpted and reorganized forms. Epitomes, handbooks, florilegia, scholia, catenae, and commentaries helped readers master large textual traditions and made older literature usable in new educational, religious, and scholarly contexts.

== Religious and intellectual contexts ==
Christianity reshaped much late antique literary production without replacing classical literary culture: Christian authors remade inherited genres and literary models, and Christian poetry in particular adapted classical forms for hymns, biblical paraphrase, doctrinal instruction, and polemic. The Bible became a central literary archive and interpretive object; biblical exegesis shaped commentaries, homilies, biblical paraphrase, and hymnic poetry, including Ephrem's Hymns on Faith.

Authorship itself could be understood as a religious practice. Hagiographers and hymnographers could present writing as devotion, ascetic labor, worship through art, and participation in holiness. This did not eliminate literary self-consciousness. Late antique Christian writers often displayed technical virtuosity, alluded to classical authors, and used literary artistry to construct authority.

Other religious and philosophical traditions were also central to late antique writing. Zoroastrian Middle Persian texts preserved legal, exegetical, cosmological, and didactic traditions, while Manichaean communities produced Middle Persian and Coptic literary corpora. Neoplatonic and Aristotelian traditions sustained philosophical commentary as a major scholarly form, especially through close reading of authoritative texts. Jewish biblical interpretation and Greek Bible versions also formed part of the wider late antique textual environment, especially through translation, revision, and debate over authoritative scriptural language.

== Literary forms ==
=== Poetry ===
Greek and Latin poets continued to use inherited meters and genres, while late antique poetry also developed Christian hymnody, biblical epic, epigram, occasional verse, poetic games, and visual experimentation. Latin poets such as Prudentius, Paulinus of Nola, Dracontius, Avitus of Vienne, and Venantius Fortunatus combined biblical narrative, moral instruction, classical allusion, and courtly or ecclesiastical praise.

Michael Roberts has characterized late antique poetic style as a "jeweled" aesthetic, marked by compression, brilliance, dense ornament, and the display of verbal craft. More recent studies similarly emphasize formal experimentation, including the material and visual dimensions of poetry, the arrangement of texts on the page, and the transformation of classical genres for new religious and political purposes.

=== Historiography and chronicles ===
Late antique historiography included both classicizing histories and explicitly Christian historical writing. Greek historians such as Procopius and Agathias wrote in a tradition that prized Atticizing style and classical ethnographic language, while Latin historical writing shifted after Ammianus Marcellinus toward chronicles, ecclesiastical history, and post-Roman regional history.

Chronicles were a widely used historical form in late antiquity. They organized events within annalistic or chronological frameworks and often combined biblical, imperial, ecclesiastical, and local history. Eusebius' chronological work was especially important for later Greek, Latin, Syriac, Armenian, and other historical traditions.

=== Letters ===
Letters were both practical instruments and literary artifacts. Late antique letter collections allowed authors to preserve friendships, petition officials, conduct doctrinal controversy, manage monasteries and bishoprics, and fashion public identities. The literary letter could include consolation, recommendation, moral exhortation, theological argument, travel narrative, invective, and political negotiation.

The distinction between pagan and Christian epistolography should not be overstated: both used inherited conventions of friendship, rhetoric, gift exchange, and social networking, even as Christian bishops, monks, and ascetics adapted the letter to ecclesiastical and spiritual purposes.

=== Exegesis, sermons, and theology ===
Biblical commentary and preaching were central to late antique Christian literature. Commentaries interpreted scripture through philological, allegorical, doctrinal, and pastoral methods, while sermons translated exegetical and theological concerns into public performance. Sermons by authors such as Augustine, John Chrysostom, Ambrose, Caesarius of Arles, and Gregory the Great show the overlap between rhetoric, liturgy, instruction, and social discipline.

Theological literature responded to disputes over the Trinity, Christology, asceticism, grace, ecclesiastical authority, and the interpretation of scripture. Such works were not merely doctrinal statements; they were shaped by rhetoric, polemic, genre, and institutional setting.

=== Rewritten Bible and biblical history ===
Another form of scriptural literature was the "rewritten Bible" or "History Bible": a continuous retelling of biblical history that paraphrased, selected, expanded, and reorganized biblical narrative rather than commenting on scripture lemma by lemma. McDowell argues that the "Bible" rewritten in such works was often not the biblical text in isolation but biblical history: these narratives typically began with creation, covered a substantial portion of sacred history, and incorporated non-biblical traditions from oral or written sources.

This kind of literature complicates a simple division between exegesis, historiography, and popular narrative. Works such as the Book of Jubilees, the Cave of Treasures, and Pirkei De-Rabbi Eliezer present biblical history from different confessional standpoints while drawing on shared repertoires of ancient and late antique tradition. McDowell treats the Cave of Treasures as a "History Bible of Eastern Christianity and early Islam", Jubilees as especially important in Byzantine reception, and Pirkei as a rabbinic counterpart to Christian and Muslim History Bibles.

=== Philosophy and commentary ===
Philosophical commentary was a major late antique scholarly form. Commentators treated authoritative texts, especially Plato and Aristotle, as starting points for philological explanation, pedagogy, and philosophical argument. The commentary form linked education, book culture, and intellectual authority, and it influenced Christian and non-Christian modes of exegesis.

=== Hagiography and biography ===
Late antiquity was a formative period for Christian biography and hagiography. Saints' lives, martyr acts, miracle collections, monastic biographies, and autobiographical works presented holiness as an object of memory, imitation, and communal identity. These texts often combined narrative, exegesis, moral instruction, and claims about sacred power. They also helped define local cults, pilgrimage sites, monastic authority, and models of ascetic life.

=== Travel, geography, and knowledge literature ===
Travel literature and pilgrimage writing grew in importance as centers of Christian religion and imperial frontiers. Pilgrimage accounts and geographical writing mapped sacred history onto physical landscapes and connected readers to places they might never visit. Late antique authors also produced technical, antiquarian, scientific, legal, grammatical, and encyclopedic works that preserved and reorganized bodies of knowledge for new readers.

=== Law and legal forms ===
Legal writing was both administrative practice and literary form. Imperial constitutions, rescripts, legal codes, inscriptions, papyri, and collections such as Cassiodorus' Variae show that late antique legal texts could use rhetoric, ceremonial language, and authorial presentation as well as technical juridical content. The Theodosian and Justinianic codifications also changed how earlier legal materials were excerpted, edited, organized, and transmitted.

=== Pseudepigraphy ===
Pseudepigraphy, the attribution of a work to someone other than its actual author, was an important late antique phenomenon because literary authority was often attached to ancient names, apostolic figures, philosophers, saints, and canonical authors. Pseudepigraphic writing could serve apologetic, polemical, pedagogical, or theological purposes, and its interpretation depends on genre, audience, and claims of authority rather than on modern categories of forgery alone.

=== Inscriptions and visual texts ===
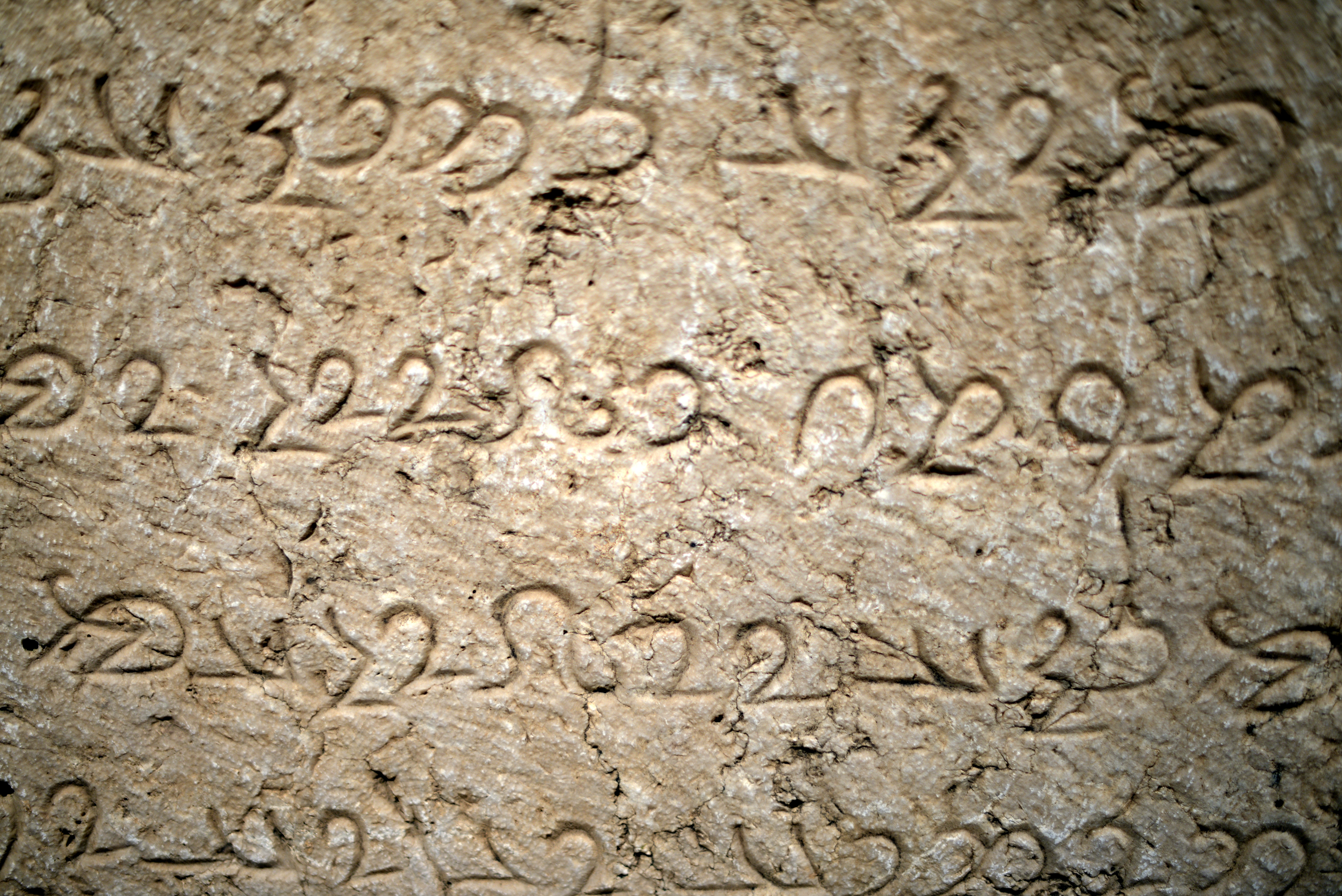
Middle Persian inscription from the Sasanian Paikuli inscription.

Inscriptions remained conspicuous throughout the late Roman world and could function as public texts, images, monuments, legal documents, dedications, verse compositions, or instruments of memory. Late antique inscriptions were often read visually as well as verbally: their placement, letter forms, material support, and relationship to statues, buildings, and earlier inscriptions shaped their meaning. This visual dimension connects epigraphy with other late antique literary experiments, including patterning, ornament, and visual poetry.

== Aesthetics and style ==
Late antique style was long judged by the standards of classical restraint and therefore often described as artificial, ornate, or decadent. Modern scholarship has reassessed this judgment by treating late antique literary style as a deliberate aesthetic. Authors frequently prized density, allusion, verbal patterning, ekphrasis, visuality, and the juxtaposition of inherited forms with new religious meanings.

This reassessment has also affected the study of genre. Rather than treating late antique works as imperfect examples of classical genres, scholars increasingly examine how writers shifted, hybridized, and repurposed genres for new institutions, audiences, and media. The result was a literary culture in which classical paideia, scriptural interpretation, imperial politics, ascetic practice, and local memory could meet within the same literary culture.

== Reception and legacy ==
Late antique literature shaped medieval literary cultures in Byzantium, the Latin West, the Islamic world, and the Christian East. Byzantine scholars preserved, excerpted, commented on, and imitated late antique Greek texts, making authors such as Procopius, late antique theologians, and philosophical commentators part of medieval Greek learned culture.

In the Latin West, schools, monastic libraries, and educational contexts transmitted late antique Latin authors as part of medieval education. Christian poets, grammarians, encyclopedists, theologians, and historians from late antiquity became authorities for medieval readers, while classical and Christian forms were reorganized through florilegia, commentaries, and school use.

Arabic and Islamic literary cultures also received late antique materials. Greek philosophical, scientific, medical, historiographical, and religious texts entered Arabic through translation and adaptation, while Syriac often served as an intermediary language. Syriac, Armenian, Georgian, and Coptic traditions likewise received late antique works through translation and related religious and literary practices.

Biblical history circulated through both written and oral channels across religious boundaries. Gavin McDowell argues that Jewish, Christian, and Muslim writers could draw on a shared "biblical koine" or repertoire of extrabiblical assumptions about sacred history, even while reshaping that material for sectarian or catechetical purposes. In this model, regional and linguistic settings could matter as much as formal religious boundaries: Syriac, Arabic, Coptic, Georgian, Armenian, Hebrew, and other traditions could preserve or adapt related narratives about Adam, the antediluvian patriarchs, the Flood, and the early history of humanity.

The modern study of late antique literature has moved away from narratives of cultural decline and toward attention to transformation, reception, multilingualism, and religious creativity. As a result, late antique literature is now studied not only as the end of ancient literary history, but also as a beginning point for Byzantine, medieval Latin, Syriac, Armenian, Georgian, Coptic, Arabic, and Islamic literary traditions.

== List of poets ==
=== Greek poets ===
- Antoninus Liberalis
- Quintus Smyrnaeus
- Nonnus
- Romanus the Melodist
- Paul the Silentiary

=== Latin poets ===
- Ausonius
- Paulinus of Nola
- Claudian
- Rutilius Namatianus
- Orientius
- Sidonius Apollinaris
- Corippus
- Arator

=== Jewish poets ===
- Yannai
- Eleazar ben Killir
- Yose ben Yose

== See also ==
- Ancient Greek literature
- Coptic literature
- Syriac literature

== Bibliography ==
- Allen, Pauline; Neil, Bronwen (2020). Greek and Latin Letters in Late Antiquity: The Christianisation of a Literary Form. Cambridge University Press.
- Aull, Charles N. (2018). "Legal Texts". In McGill, Scott; Watts, Edward J. (eds.). A Companion to Late Antique Literature. Wiley Blackwell. pp. 417–430.
- Baltussen, Han (2018). "Philosophical Commentary". In McGill, Scott; Watts, Edward J. (eds.). A Companion to Late Antique Literature. Wiley Blackwell. pp. 297–311.
- Bar-Asher, Moshe (2006). "Mishnaic Hebrew: An Introductory Survey". In Katz, Steven T. (ed.). The Cambridge History of Judaism. Vol. 4: The Late Roman-Rabbinic Period. Cambridge University Press. pp. 369–403.
- Brakke, David (2018). "Coptic". In McGill, Scott; Watts, Edward J. (eds.). A Companion to Late Antique Literature. Wiley Blackwell. pp. 61–73.
- Breuer, Yochanan (2006). "Aramaic in Late Antiquity". In Katz, Steven T. (ed.). The Cambridge History of Judaism. Vol. 4: The Late Roman-Rabbinic Period. Cambridge University Press. pp. 457–491.
- Burgess, R. W. (2018). "Chronicles". In McGill, Scott; Watts, Edward J. (eds.). A Companion to Late Antique Literature. Wiley Blackwell. pp. 177–191.
- Bussières, Marie-Pierre (2018). "Biblical Commentary". In McGill, Scott; Watts, Edward J. (eds.). A Companion to Late Antique Literature. Wiley Blackwell. pp. 313–326.
- Darling Young, Robin (2018). "Armenian". In McGill, Scott; Watts, Edward J. (eds.). A Companion to Late Antique Literature. Wiley Blackwell. pp. 75–86.
- Daryaee, Touraj (2018). "Middle Persian (Pahlavi)". In McGill, Scott; Watts, Edward J. (eds.). A Companion to Late Antique Literature. Wiley Blackwell. pp. 103–121.
- Drijvers, Jan Willem (2018). "Travel and Pilgrimage Literature". In McGill, Scott; Watts, Edward J. (eds.). A Companion to Late Antique Literature. Wiley Blackwell. pp. 359–372.
- Elsner, Jaś; Hernández Lobato, Jesús (2017). "Introduction: The Poetics of Late Latin Literature". In Elsner, Jaś; Hernández Lobato, Jesús (eds.). The Poetics of Late Latin Literature. Oxford Studies in Late Antiquity. Oxford University Press. pp. 1–22.
- Formisano, Marco (2018). "Literature of Knowledge". In McGill, Scott; Watts, Edward J. (eds.). A Companion to Late Antique Literature. Wiley Blackwell. pp. 491–504.
- Garcea, Alessandro (2018). "Grammar". In McGill, Scott; Watts, Edward J. (eds.). A Companion to Late Antique Literature. Wiley Blackwell. pp. 451–470.
- Greatrex, Geoffrey (2016). "Introduction". In Elton, Hugh; Greatrex, Geoffrey (eds.). Shifting Genres in Late Antiquity. Ashgate. pp. 1–8.
- Harris, Jay M. (2006). "Midrash Halachah". In Katz, Steven T. (ed.). The Cambridge History of Judaism. Vol. 4: The Late Roman-Rabbinic Period. Cambridge University Press. pp. 336–368.
- Horster, Marietta; Reitz, Christiane (2018). "Handbooks, Epitomes, and Florilegia". In McGill, Scott; Watts, Edward J. (eds.). A Companion to Late Antique Literature. Wiley Blackwell. pp. 431–450.
- Insley, Sarah; Saint-Laurent, Jeanne-Nicole Mellon (2018). "Biography, Autobiography, and Hagiography". In McGill, Scott; Watts, Edward J. (eds.). A Companion to Late Antique Literature. Wiley Blackwell. pp. 373–388.
- Johnson, Scott Fitzgerald (2016). Literary Territories: Cartographical Thinking in Late Antiquity. Oxford University Press.
- Johnson, Scott Fitzgerald (2018). "Greek". In McGill, Scott; Watts, Edward J. (eds.). A Companion to Late Antique Literature. Wiley Blackwell. pp. 9–26.
- Kaldellis, Anthony (2018). "Late Antique Literature in Byzantium". In McGill, Scott; Watts, Edward J. (eds.). A Companion to Late Antique Literature. Wiley Blackwell. pp. 557–568.
- Kelly, Christopher (2018). "Antiquarian Literature". In McGill, Scott; Watts, Edward J. (eds.). A Companion to Late Antique Literature. Wiley Blackwell. pp. 539–556.
- King, Daniel (2018). "Translation". In McGill, Scott; Watts, Edward J. (eds.). A Companion to Late Antique Literature. Wiley Blackwell. pp. 523–538.
- Kalmin, Richard (2006). "The Formation and Character of the Babylonian Talmud". In Katz, Steven T. (ed.). The Cambridge History of Judaism. Vol. 4: The Late Roman-Rabbinic Period. Cambridge University Press. pp. 840–876.
- Katz, Steven T. (2006). "Introduction". In Katz, Steven T. (ed.). The Cambridge History of Judaism. Vol. 4: The Late Roman-Rabbinic Period. Cambridge University Press. pp. 1–22.
- Kraemer, David (2006). "The Mishnah". In Katz, Steven T. (ed.). The Cambridge History of Judaism. Vol. 4: The Late Roman-Rabbinic Period. Cambridge University Press. pp. 299–315.
- Krueger, Derek (2004). Writing and Holiness: The Practice of Authorship in the Early Christian East. University of Pennsylvania Press.
- Kulikowski, Michael (2018). "Classicizing History and Historical Epitomes". In McGill, Scott; Watts, Edward J. (eds.). A Companion to Late Antique Literature. Wiley Blackwell. pp. 143–160.
- Lössl, Josef (2018). "Christian Theological Literature". In McGill, Scott; Watts, Edward J. (eds.). A Companion to Late Antique Literature. Wiley Blackwell. pp. 327–342.
- Mandel, Paul (2006). "The Tosefta". In Katz, Steven T. (ed.). The Cambridge History of Judaism. Vol. 4: The Late Roman-Rabbinic Period. Cambridge University Press. pp. 316–335.
- Martínez, Javier (2018). "Pseudepigraphy". In McGill, Scott; Watts, Edward J. (eds.). A Companion to Late Antique Literature. Wiley Blackwell. pp. 401–416.
- Maxwell, Jaclyn (2018). "Sermons". In McGill, Scott; Watts, Edward J. (eds.). A Companion to Late Antique Literature. Wiley Blackwell. pp. 343–358.
- McDowell, Gavin (2025). The Rewritten Bible in Late Antiquity: Pirqe de-Rabbi Eliezer, Jubilees, and the Cave of Treasures. Studia Judaica. Vol. 138. Walter de Gruyter. doi:10.1515/9783111590776.
- McGill, Scott; Watts, Edward J. (2018). "Introduction". In McGill, Scott; Watts, Edward J. (eds.). A Companion to Late Antique Literature. Wiley Blackwell. pp. 3–8.
- Miguélez-Cavero, Laura; McGill, Scott (2018). "Christian Poetry". In McGill, Scott; Watts, Edward J. (eds.). A Companion to Late Antique Literature. Wiley Blackwell. pp. 259–280.
- Moscovitz, Leib (2006). "The Formation and Character of the Jerusalem Talmud". In Katz, Steven T. (ed.). The Cambridge History of Judaism. Vol. 4: The Late Roman-Rabbinic Period. Cambridge University Press. pp. 663–677.
- Mulligan, Bret (2018). "Epigrams, Occasional Poetry, and Poetic Games". In McGill, Scott; Watts, Edward J. (eds.). A Companion to Late Antique Literature. Wiley Blackwell. pp. 241–258.
- Neuwirth, Angelika (2019). The Qur'an and Late Antiquity: A Shared Heritage. Translated by Wilder, Samuel. Oxford University Press.
- Pucci, Joseph (2018). "Late Antique Literature in the Western Middle Ages". In McGill, Scott; Watts, Edward J. (eds.). A Companion to Late Antique Literature. Wiley Blackwell. pp. 583–596.
- Rapp, Stephen H. Jr. (2018). "Georgian". In McGill, Scott; Watts, Edward J. (eds.). A Companion to Late Antique Literature. Wiley Blackwell. pp. 87–102.
- Roberts, Michael (1989). The Jeweled Style: Poetry and Poetics in Late Antiquity. Cornell University Press.
- Shinan, Avigdor (2006). "The Late Midrashic, Paytanic, and Targumic Literature". In Katz, Steven T. (ed.). The Cambridge History of Judaism. Vol. 4: The Late Roman-Rabbinic Period. Cambridge University Press. pp. 678–698.
- Sogno, Cristiana; Watts, Edward J. (2018). "Epistolography". In McGill, Scott; Watts, Edward J. (eds.). A Companion to Late Antique Literature. Wiley Blackwell. pp. 389–400.
- van Bladel, Kevin T. (2018). "Languages of Arabia". In McGill, Scott; Watts, Edward J. (eds.). A Companion to Late Antique Literature. Wiley Blackwell. pp. 123–142.
- van Bladel, Kevin T. (2018). "The Arabic Reception of Late Antique Literature". In McGill, Scott; Watts, Edward J. (eds.). A Companion to Late Antique Literature. Wiley Blackwell. pp. 569–582.
- Van Dam, Raymond (2018). "Inscriptions". In McGill, Scott; Watts, Edward J. (eds.). A Companion to Late Antique Literature. Wiley Blackwell. pp. 505–522.
- Watt, John W. (2018). "Syriac". In McGill, Scott; Watts, Edward J. (eds.). A Companion to Late Antique Literature. Wiley Blackwell. pp. 47–60.
- Wickes, Jeffrey (2019). Bible and Poetry in Late Antique Mesopotamia: Ephrem's Hymns on Faith. Christianity in Late Antiquity. Vol. 5. University of California Press.
- Whitby, Mary; Roberts, Michael (2018). "Epic Poetry". In McGill, Scott; Watts, Edward J. (eds.). A Companion to Late Antique Literature. Wiley Blackwell. pp. 221–240.
- Wood, Ian (2018). "Latin". In McGill, Scott; Watts, Edward J. (eds.). A Companion to Late Antique Literature. Wiley Blackwell. pp. 27–45.
