= Philagrius (comes Orientis) =

Roman statesman

Philagrius (fl. 361–382 AD) was a Roman politician. From 361 to 363 he was a notary in service of the Emperor Julian. In Gaul in 361 Julian employed Philagrius to kidnap the Alamannic king Vadomarius, whom Julian's rival, the Emperor Constantius II, had instigated to attack him. Philagrius accompanied Julian on his invasion of Persia in 363.

In 382 Philagrius was serving as comes Orientis, that is, governor of the diocese of the East, under the Emperor Theodosius I. During his term of office a famine broke out in the region. Initially said to have shown moderation in his response, Philagrius eventually lost patience and flogged the bakers for raising prices, stopping only after the Antiochene rhetor protested Libanius. Philagrius exchanged several letters with Libanius, who praised him for his contempt of lampoons and acclamations alike.

He is probably identical with the patrician Philagrius who was an ancestor of the Western Roman emperor Avitus and of bishop Magnus Felix Ennodius. Both of them were both born in Gaul, and since Philagrius was serving under Julian in Gaul in 361 he may have come from there as well.
