= Late antique Egypt =

History and culture of Egypt in late antiquity

Late antique Egypt refers to the history and culture of Egypt during late antiquity, broadly from the later third century to the seventh century AD. In political terms, the period runs from the reforms of Diocletian and the late Roman Empire through the Byzantine period and the Muslim conquest of Egypt. In cultural and art-historical studies, the term is sometimes used more broadly for developments from about 250 to 700, a period marked by the transformation of Roman provincial society, the expansion of Christianity, the emergence of Coptic literature, and the continuation and adaptation of Greek and Egyptian traditions.

Egypt was one of the best-documented regions of the late antique Mediterranean. Thousands of Greek and Coptic papyri, inscriptions, archaeological remains, monastic writings, hagiography, and works of art make it possible to study not only imperial administration and the church, but also landholding, villages, households, labor, literacy, domestic objects, and local religious practice. Nevertheless, urban landscapes, financial matters, and literate groups are overrepresented in the surviving evidence, and archaeology has preserved some settings better than others.

The period saw both change and continuity. Cities and villages continued to operate within the structures of the Roman state; Greek remained central to administration, education, and elite culture; and Coptic developed as a written form of Egyptian closely tied to Christian and scribal culture. Religious change was gradual and local. Traditional temples lost their institutional role, but their buildings were reused in varied ways, while Christianity was practiced through households, shrines, workshops, monasteries, processions, and sacred landscapes as well as through bishops and councils.

== Periodization and sources ==
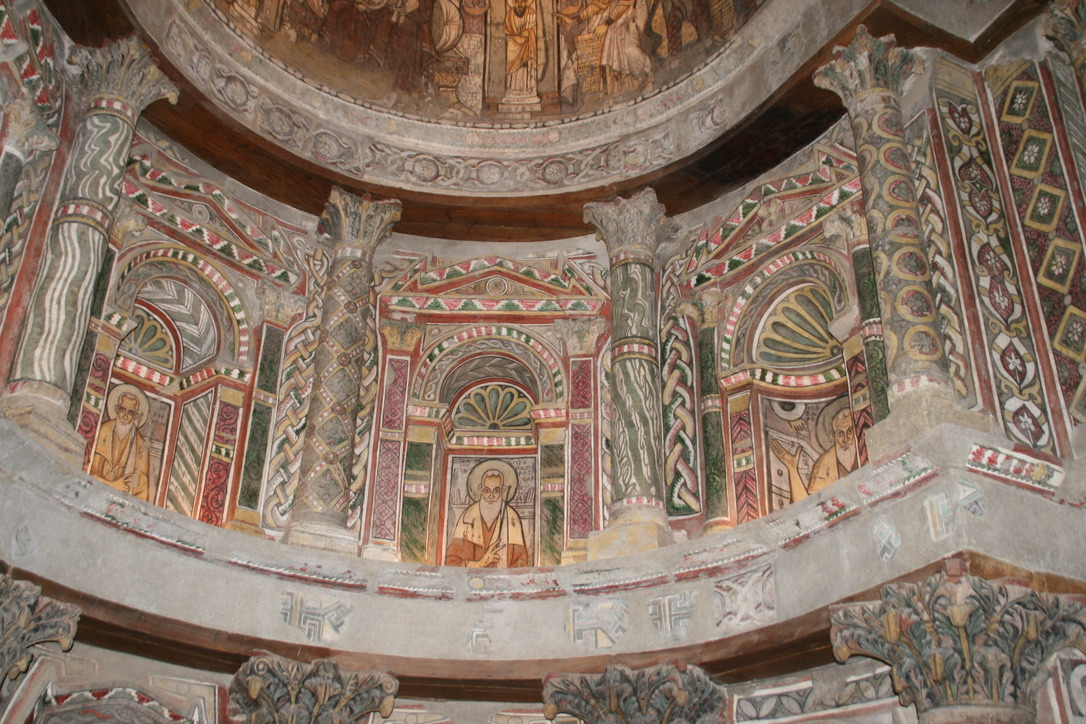
Wall painting of Shenoute, Pcol and Pshoi in the Red Monastery near Sohag, one of the major monastic centers of late antique Upper Egypt.

The chronological limits of late antique Egypt vary according to the subject being studied. Social histories often begin with the emergence from the third-century crisis and the reforms associated with Diocletian, when administrative, fiscal, military, and monetary changes reshaped Roman government in Egypt. Art-historical studies may use a broader span from the mid-third century to about 700, since artistic and material developments crossed the political boundary of the Arab conquest.

The chief documentary evidence consists of papyri and ostraca in Greek, Coptic, and, to a lesser extent in this period, Latin and other languages. Greek documents are especially abundant for taxation, leases, loans, petitions, correspondence, municipal affairs, and the management of land. Coptic documents become common later, but early Coptic letters and literary manuscripts show the growth of a new written form of Egyptian in Christian and monastic contexts.

The abundance of evidence has its own limits. Bagnall emphasizes that papyri often preserve the viewpoint of propertied and literate groups, especially in the nome capitals such as Oxyrhynchus and Hermopolis. Village archives often survive because villagers interacted with taxation, credit, and urban institutions. Archaeological survival is also uneven: many ancient settlements were damaged by modern occupation, agriculture, sebbakh digging, papyrus hunting, or excavation practices focused on texts, temples, and cemeteries rather than complete towns and villages.

== Geography and environment ==
Late antique Egypt was shaped by the same environmental structures that had long defined Egyptian life: the Nile Valley, the Delta, the Fayum, the desert margins, the oases, and the Red Sea routes. The Nile made north-south transport easier than movement across the valley, and the agricultural year was organized around inundation, sowing, harvest, and the maintenance of dikes and canals. The desert was not empty space but a zone of quarries, roads, military posts, monastic settlements, pilgrimage routes, and symbolic retreat.

Food production centered on grain, especially wheat and barley, but the agricultural system also included legumes, oil crops, vegetables, fruit, flax, and animal husbandry. Transport by river linked villages, nome capitals, Alexandria, and imperial supply networks. The Nile also connected Egypt to the wider Mediterranean, while desert roads connected the valley to the oases, the Eastern Desert, and the Red Sea ports.

== Administration and political history ==
Under the Roman Empire, Egypt was governed as a strategically important province whose grain, taxation, and communications were closely watched by the imperial state. In late antiquity, Diocletian's reforms reorganized the province, altered fiscal administration, and strengthened military arrangements. The older nome system remained important as a territorial framework, but provincial government, city councils, fiscal offices, and military commands were reshaped by late Roman administrative practice.

The fourth century saw a complicated balance between continuity and institutional change. Cities retained councils, officials, archives, public buildings, and wealthy landowners, but their civic autonomy was narrowed by the needs of taxation, administration, and imperial service. The military was not simply a frontier institution; soldiers, officers, requisitions, transport, and legal disputes connected the army to everyday provincial society.

The fifth and sixth centuries placed Egypt within the eastern Roman, or Byzantine, state. Imperial rule remained mediated through local elites, officials, landowners, bishops, monasteries, and fiscal agents. Christian controversy also affected public life. Theological disputes became especially visible after imperial support for Christianity, and Egypt was central to controversies associated with Athanasius, the Melitian schism, and, after the Council of Chalcedon in 451, the growing division between Chalcedonian and non-Chalcedonian churches.

In the seventh century, Byzantine control was interrupted by the Sasanian occupation. According to Török's summary, Alexandria fell to the Persians in 618 and the rest of Egypt in 619; Byzantine rule was restored after the peace of 628. The Arab conquest of 639-646 then altered Egypt's political and cultural setting, though material and documentary evidence suggests substantial continuities in the first generations of Islamic rule.

== Settlement and society ==
=== Cities ===
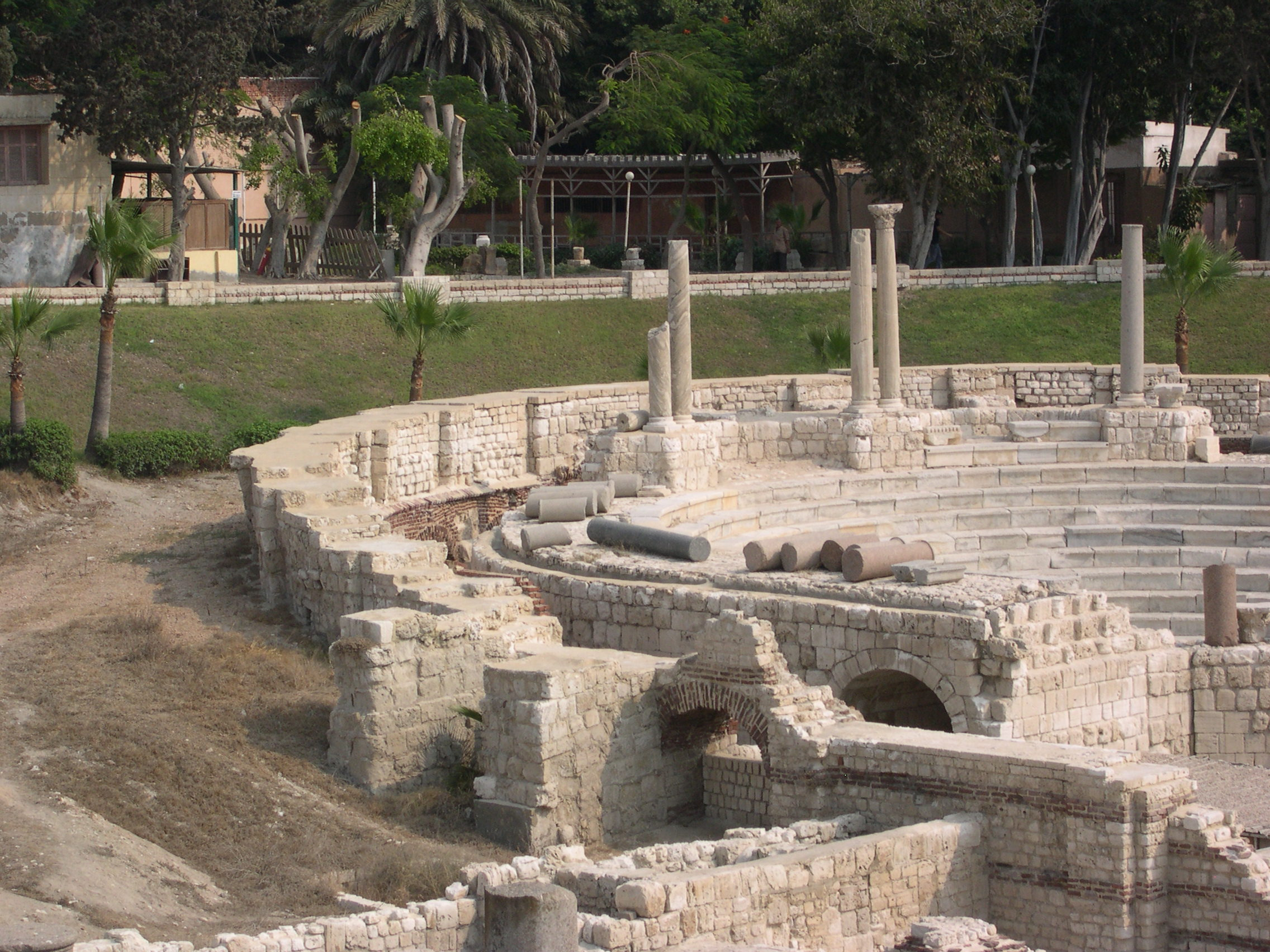
The theatre at Kom El Deka in Alexandria, part of a late antique urban complex that included baths, lecture halls and elite domestic spaces.

The cities of late antique Egypt included old nome capitals such as Hermopolis, Oxyrhynchus, Arsinoe, Panopolis, Lycopolis, and Antinoopolis, as well as Alexandria, the great Mediterranean metropolis. Bagnall's treatment of the period concentrates largely on the chora, or country outside Alexandria, because the surviving papyri from provincial cities and villages provide unusually rich evidence for social and economic life.

Provincial cities were centers of administration, landholding, credit, education, craft production, litigation, and taxation. Their public landscapes included streets, colonnades, baths, churches, temples, official buildings, and, in some places, military installations. The city was not isolated from the countryside: urban landowners managed rural estates, villagers paid taxes through urban institutions, and the circulation of commodities, documents, and officials tied cities to their hinterlands.

=== Villages and countryside ===
Villages were the basic units of rural life. They varied in size, wealth, and relationship to the nome capital, but many were closely linked through land leases, tax obligations, credit, labor, and transport. Documentary archives from places such as Karanis and Theadelphia preserve leases, petitions, receipts, and correspondence, though often through the perspective of fiscal and legal demands placed on villagers.

Rural society included independent farmers, tenants, hired laborers, estate managers, craftsmen, shepherds, transport workers, women active in household and village economies, and people living on the margins of cultivated land. Large landowners and urban creditors could exert pressure on villages, but rural communities were not passive; villagers petitioned, negotiated, moved, borrowed, leased, and used the legal machinery available to them.

== Economy and daily life ==
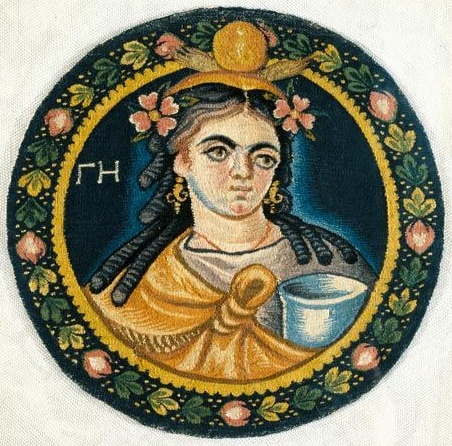
Fourth-century Egyptian textile medallion depicting Gaia-Isis.

Agriculture laid the basis for the late antique Egyptian economy. Landholding ranged from small plots and leases to large estates, and documentary papyri show a world of rents, wages, tax payments, loans, deliveries, and requisitions. The fiscal system made agricultural production visible in unusually detailed ways, especially where grain, money, and transport intersected with state demands.

Urban and rural economies also depended on craft production, trade, services, and household labor. Textiles were particularly important: flax, wool, spinning, weaving, clothing, and furnishing textiles appear in documentary and archaeological evidence. Objects of dress, including beads, bracelets, torcs, shoes, sandals, hairpins, and earrings, show how age, gender, status, protection, and local taste were embodied in everyday material culture.

Households were material worlds as well as legal and economic units. Archaeological collections from Roman and late antique Egypt preserve dress accessories, sandals, beads, textile tools, children's objects, toys, bells, cymbals, and amuletic objects. Swift, Stoner, and Pudsey argue that such objects help reconstruct social roles, family relationships, life-course identities, sensory experience, and domestic production that are often muted in textual sources.

Family life was shaped by marriage, divorce, inheritance, slavery, patronage, dependency, and the authority of parents and household heads. Papyri reveal conflicts as well as cooperation: petitions, contracts, dowries, divisions of property, loans, and disputes show how families used writing and law to manage vulnerability and advantage. Women appear in the evidence as property holders, workers, litigants, correspondents, and participants in household economies, though the surviving record is filtered through legal and documentary conventions.

== Language, literacy and culture ==
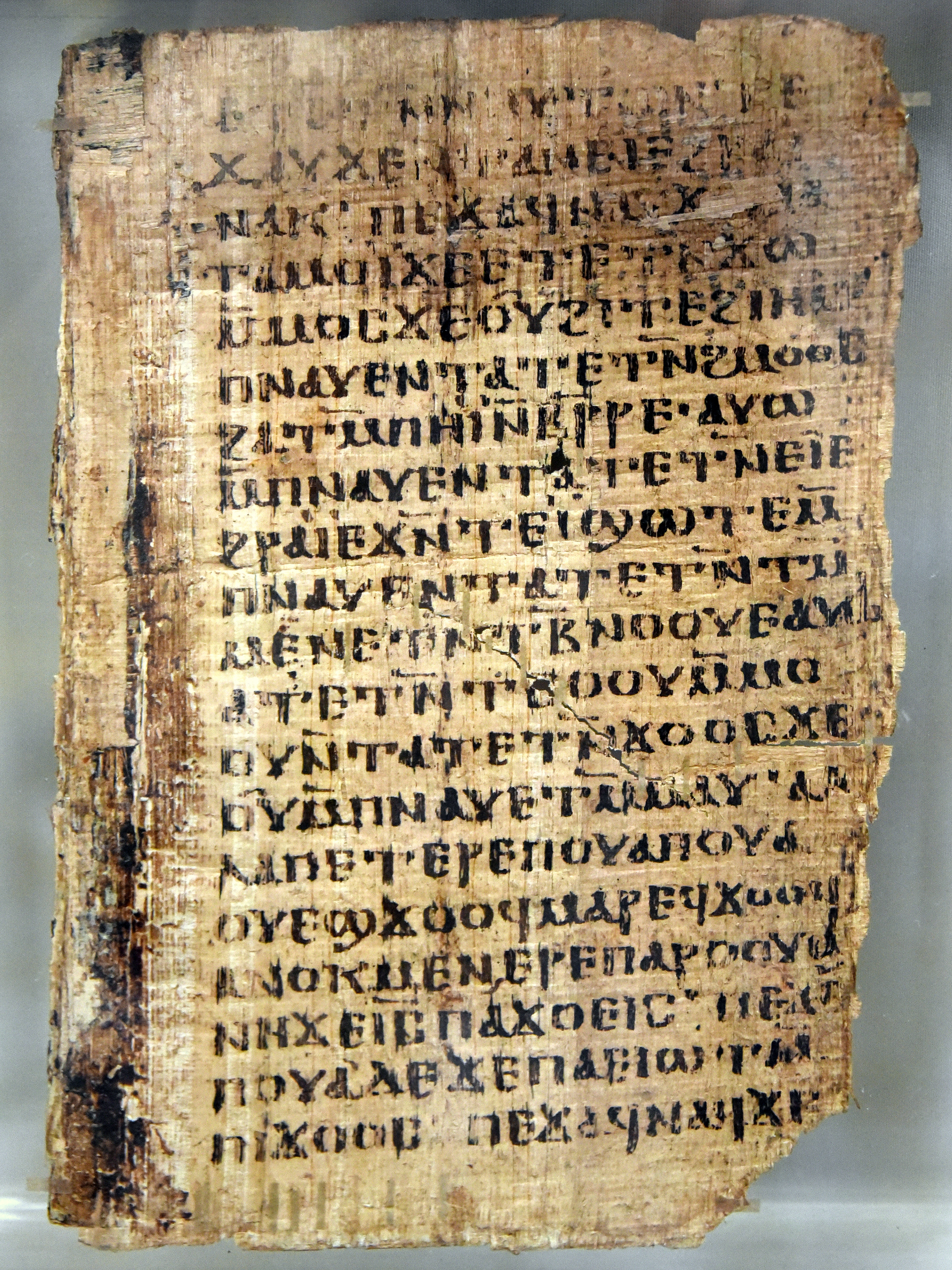
A Sahidic Coptic manuscript of the Life of Shenoute, dated to the sixth or seventh century.

Late antique Egypt was multilingual. Greek remained the principal language of administration, law, elite education, and much documentary writing. Latin had a narrower official and military role. Egyptian continued as a spoken language and, in late antiquity, acquired a new written form in Coptic, which used the Greek alphabet with additional signs derived from Demotic for sounds not represented in Greek.

Coptic did not simply replace Greek. Choat argues that Coptic developed at the intersection of Christian and non-Christian, provincial and imperial, Greek and Egyptian, town and country, and literary and documentary contexts. Greek culture and education remained important, while Coptic became increasingly significant for biblical translation, monastic literature, letters, sermons, and eventually documents of daily life.

The rise of Coptic was closely connected with Christianity and monasticism, but it was not created by monks alone. Earlier experiments in writing Egyptian with Greek letters, bilingual scribal practice, priestly learning, Christian book production, and educational settings all contributed to the emergence of Coptic. Monastic communities helped spread and consolidate it by linking villages, towns, the Thebaid, Alexandria, pilgrims, and scribal networks.

Literacy was socially stratified. Many people encountered written documents without writing them personally, through scribes, agents, officials, or literate family members. Bagnall describes late antique Egypt as a society in which writing penetrated everyday life even for many illiterates, while economic position, practical need, gender, occupation, and social status shaped who learned to write and in what language.

== Religion and Christianization ==
=== Temples and traditional cults ===
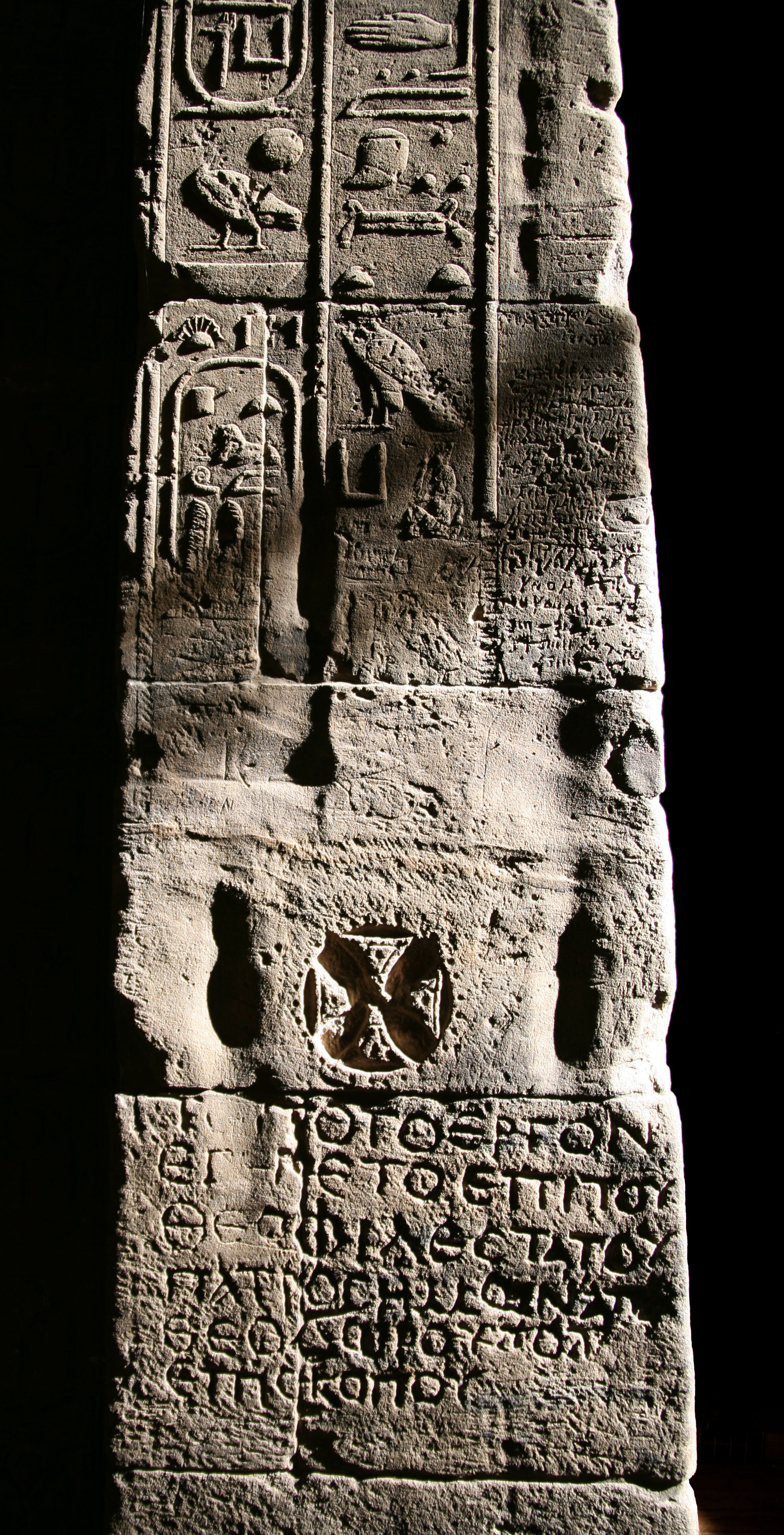
Coptic cross and Greek inscription carved into the Temple of Isis at Philae, reflecting the Christian reuse of older temple spaces.

Traditional Egyptian and Greco-Egyptian cults remained visible into late antiquity, but their institutional basis weakened. Temples had long been central to Egyptian religious life as places of ritual action, sacrifice, procession, priestly authority, property, and local identity. By the fourth and fifth centuries, many temples had lost resources, personnel, or public functions, though older religious practices and ideas continued in modified forms.

The fate of temples was more varied than a simple story of destruction or conversion into churches. Dijkstra argues that Christian literary sources often dramatize temple destruction, while inscriptions, papyri, and archaeology show a wider range of outcomes: abandonment, secular reuse, dismantling for building material, military use, continued local significance, and, in some cases, conversion into churches. Violence and church conversion occurred, but were exceptional parts of a larger transformation of sacred landscapes.

Philae and the First Cataract region show the complexity of this process. Literary evidence associated with Justinian presents the end of the Isis cult in dramatic terms, but archaeological and epigraphic evidence complicates any simple account of sudden destruction. Temple spaces could be altered, reused, reinscribed, or incorporated into new Christian topographies while retaining traces of older sacred and monumental meanings.

=== Christianization as local practice ===
Christianization in Egypt was not only a matter of imperial law, episcopal policy, or formal conversion. Frankfurter describes it as a local process through which Christian symbols, stories, saints, scriptures, and ritual forms were assembled in homes, workshops, shrines, monastic settings, and landscapes. Older gestures and habits could be reworked into Christian idioms rather than simply surviving unchanged or disappearing.

Domestic religion is especially important for understanding this process. Late antique households used lamps, bread stamps, charms, figurines, amulets, votive objects, and household shrines in ways that addressed protection, fertility, healing, fortune, and family continuity. Frankfurter argues that such practices should not be reduced to "pagan survivals"; they show how Christianity was made meaningful through household needs and material practices.

Magic, astrology, amulets, and protective objects also crossed boundaries that modern categories often separate. Bagnall notes that Christians as well as non-Christians could use horoscopes, charms, and amulets, while monastic and hagiographic sources continued to assume the reality of demons and invisible powers. Material evidence likewise shows Christian symbols used in protective ways on pendants, bracelets, textiles, and other objects.

=== Holy men, saints and demons ===
The Egyptian holy man became a major figure in late antique religion. Ascetics, monks, bishops, and saints were represented as healers, exorcists, judges, prophets, protectors, and mediators of divine power. Frankfurter argues that holy men could oppose older cults while also reorganizing older expectations about demons, spirits, sacred substances, blessing, and local religious authority.

Shrines of saints became places of blessing, healing, dreams, votive donation, festival, procession, divination, and contact with sacred power. In this sense, saint cults did not merely replace temples; they helped create a new sacred geography in which bodies, objects, relics, images, stories, and journeys connected local communities to Christian authority.

== Monasticism ==
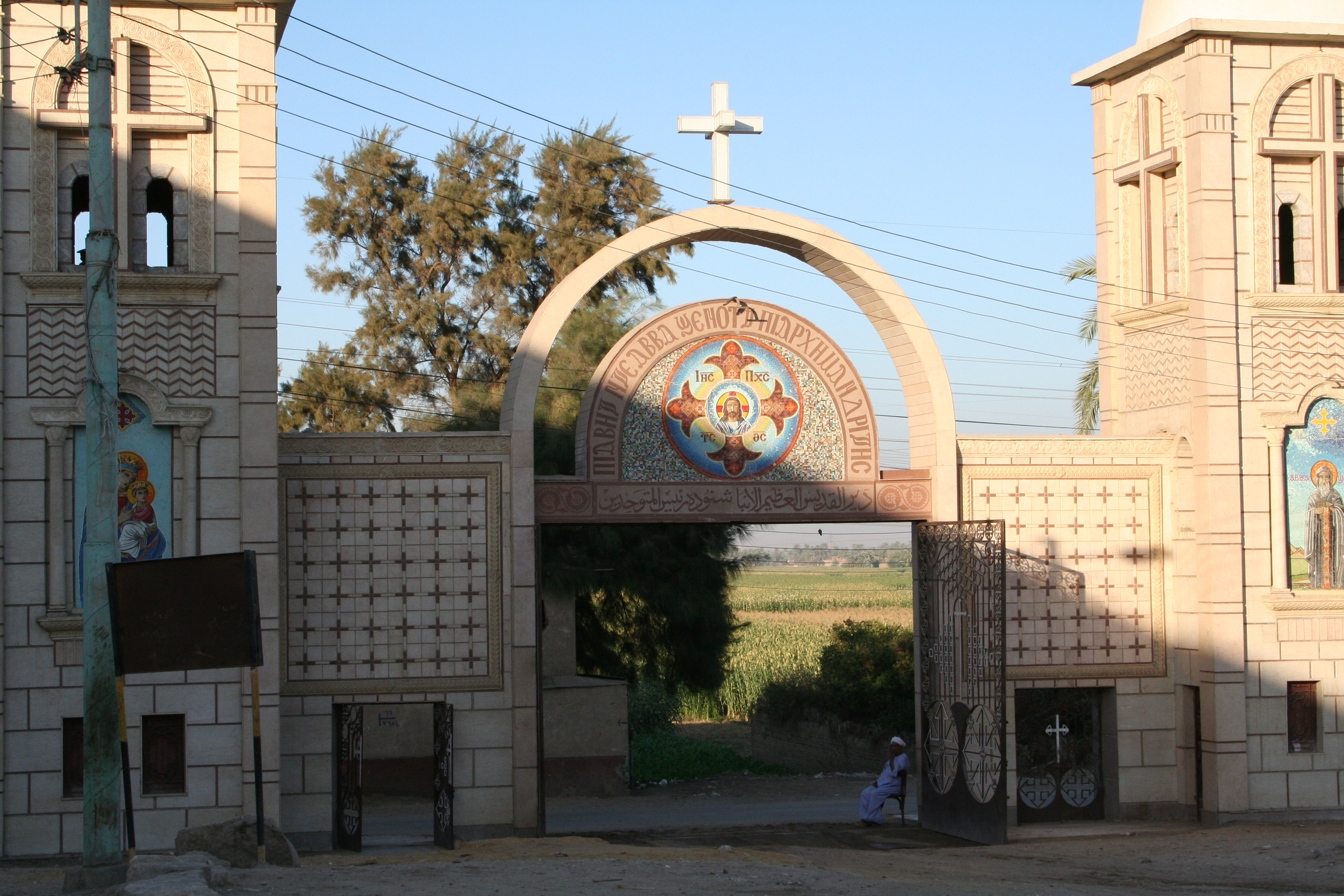
The White Monastery near Sohag, associated with Shenoute of Atripe and one of the most important institutions of Coptic monasticism.

Egypt was one of the most influential centers of early Christian monasticism. Literary traditions associated with Antony, Pachomius, Macarius, Shenoute, and other ascetics made the Egyptian desert a central imaginative landscape for Christian renunciation. These texts helped create a powerful image of monks withdrawing to the desert, fighting demons, practicing discipline, and becoming living models of holiness.

Archaeology complicates the literary image of a purely isolated desert monasticism. Brooks Hedstrom argues that the monastic landscape of Egypt included many kinds of settlements and spaces: cells, villages, quarries, abandoned monuments, desert margins, churches, storerooms, courtyards, residences, and large institutional complexes. Monastic communities were built environments that transformed underused or marginal landscapes and were connected to agriculture, roads, visitors, and nearby settlements.

Pachomian communities and Shenoute's federation near Atripe show different forms of organized monastic life. Pachomian monasticism developed communal structures, rules, labor, and networks of houses, while Shenoute's White Monastery combined ascetic discipline, major building programs, preaching to lay and monastic audiences, social authority, and authority over a wider monastic domain. Monasteries could own property, receive visitors, manage production, and exercise influence beyond their walls.

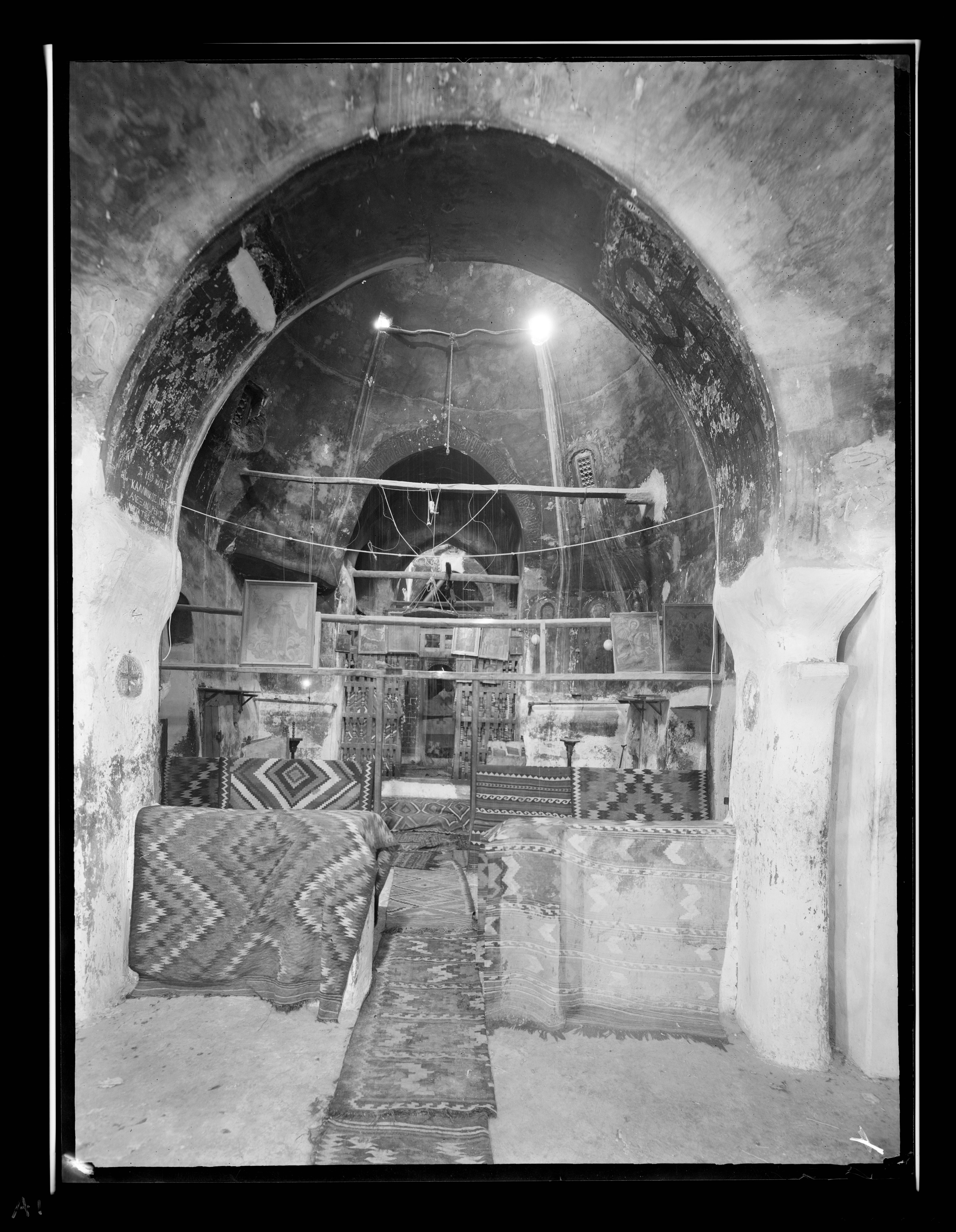
Interior of the Monastery of Saint Anthony in the Eastern Desert, a major site of Egyptian monastic tradition.

Monastic sites were also places of writing and memory. Coptic literary production, libraries, sermons, biblical copying, letters, graffiti, and inscriptions linked monastic communities to the spread of Coptic and to the preservation of Egyptian Christian traditions. Monks were therefore not only religious specialists but also major agents in the creation of late antique Egyptian textual culture.

== Pilgrimage and sacred landscape ==
Pilgrimage in late antique Egypt included journeys to living holy men, martyr shrines, monastic centers, healing sanctuaries, and regional sacred sites. Pilgrims sought blessing, healing, instruction, protection, dreams, or contact with a holy person or place. Egypt's pilgrimage culture drew on older patterns of sacred travel while also developing Christian centers and narratives.

The pilgrimage center of Abu Mena became one of the best-known Christian sacred sites in Egypt. Associated with Saint Menas, it included churches, a martyr shrine, facilities for visitors, and a landscape organized around healing and devotion. Such centers linked local cult, regional movement, architecture, liturgy, and the circulation of objects such as flasks and votive offerings.

Other sacred landscapes were more regional or monastic. Shenoute's domain near Atripe included the White Monastery, associated settlements, agricultural space, routes, and ritual movement. A liturgical procession preserved in a Coptic manuscript shows how pilgrims could move through a monastic landscape, using scripture, hymnody, stations, and the memory of Shenoute to map holiness onto territory.

== Art, architecture and material culture ==
Late antique Egyptian art is often called Coptic art, but modern scholarship has challenged older views that treated it as anti-classical, isolated, or merely "folk" art. Török argues that late antique art in Egypt should be understood as part of the wider late antique, early Byzantine Mediterranean, Hellenistic, and Roman visual forms.

Art and architecture show both continuity and change. Classical and Hellenistic motifs continued in textiles, sculpture, architectural decoration, and elite display, but they were reinterpreted in new social and religious contexts. Christian imagery gradually reshaped artistic production through crosses, saints, biblical scenes, church decoration, monastic paintings, and objects associated with devotion and protection.

Material culture gives a different view of the period. Dress objects, beads, bracelets, shoes, sandals, spindle whorls, toys, bells, and domestic tools show how people performed social roles and experienced daily life. Cross pendants, inscribed bracelets, amuletic bells, and protective objects show the material embodiment of Christian identity and protection, often in continuity with older habits of using objects to mediate power.

Architecture was likewise reused and repurposed across many, sometimes unrelated categories. For example, temples could be repurposed into forts, or houses, storehouses, churches, or even be taken apart as a source for more building material. Monasteries and their surrounding complexes may have incorporated not only churches, but also local residences and work areas.

== Transition to Islamic rule ==
Late antique Egypt did not end at a single moment in time. The Arab conquest altered political authority and Egypt's place within the Eastern Mediterranean and Near Eastern world. In language and material culture, however, many late antique practices continued into the early Islamic period. Greek and Coptic documents, Christian communities, monasteries, textile production, burial practices, and forms of dress and adornment show continuity as well as change.

Some objects and practices acquired new meanings after the conquest. Cross pendants, for example, continued to be used in Christian burials, but their social meaning could shift once Christians lived under Muslim rule. The dress cultures of the latest Byzantine and earliest Islamic periods are therefore difficult to separate sharply.

== See also ==
- Arabia in late antiquity
- Late antique Syria
- Roman Egypt
- Egypt (Roman province)
- Byzantine Egypt
- Coptic history
- Coptic literature
- Coptic art
- Muslim conquest of Egypt
- Late antiquity
