= Thyssen-Bornemisza Museum =

Art museum in Madrid, Spain

Thyssen-Bornemisza National Museum
- Museo Nacional Thyssen-Bornemisza
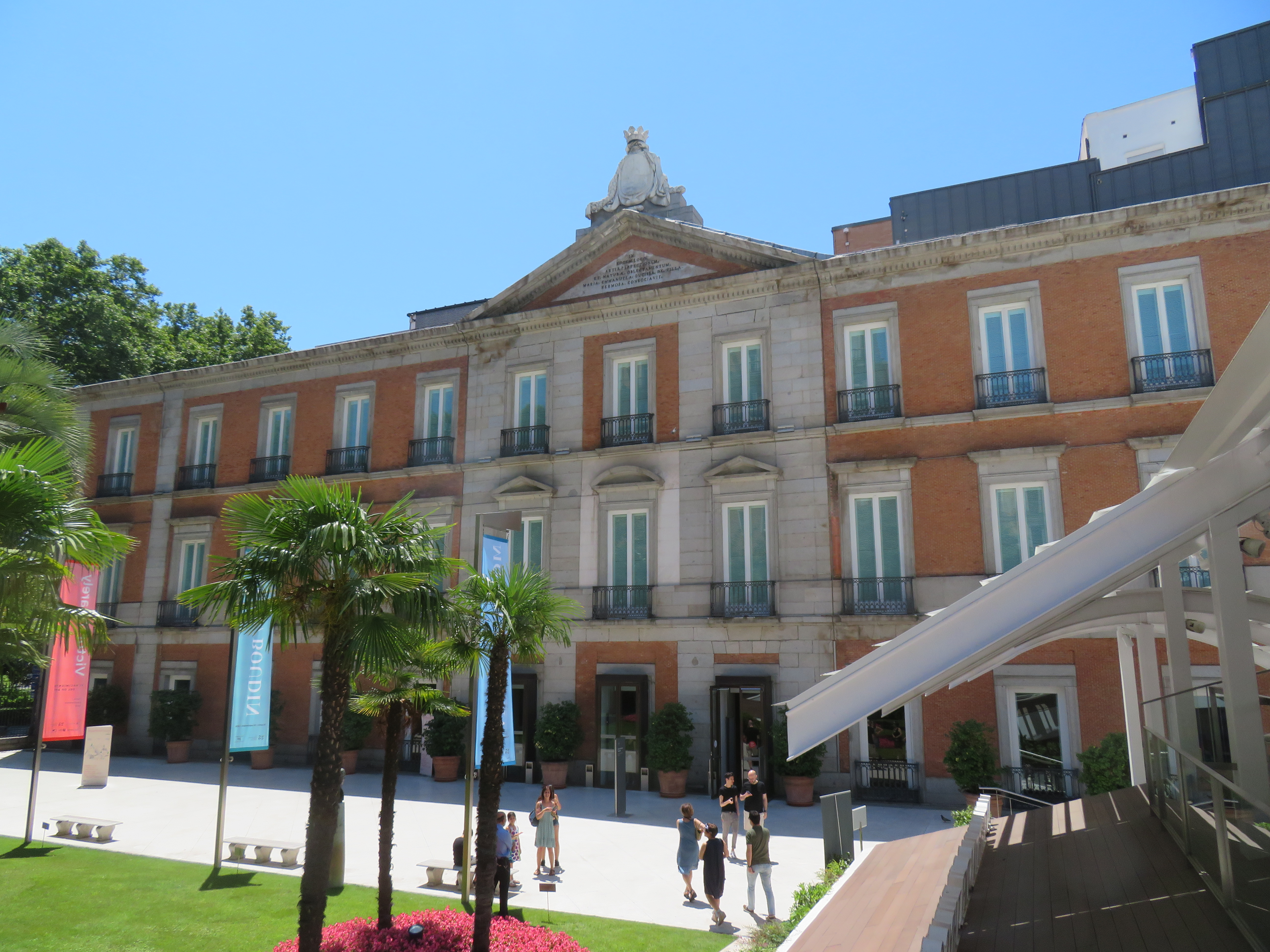
- Site of the Retiro and the Prado
- Interactive fullscreen map
- Established: 1992
- Location: Palace of Villahermosa; Paseo del Prado, 8. Madrid, Spain
- Coordinates: 40°24′58″N 3°41′42″W
- Collection size: 1,600
- Visitors: 1.052.014 (2017)
- Founder: Heinrich, Baron Thyssen-Bornemisza de Kászon
- Directors: Guillermo Solana (Artistic Director), Evelio Acevedo (Managing Director)
- Public transit access: Banco de España
- Website: www.museothyssen.org

The Thyssen-Bornemisza National Museum (Spanish: Museo Nacional Thyssen-Bornemisza, pronounced [muˈseo ˈtisen boɾneˈmisa]; named after its founder, Baron Heinrich Thyssen-Bornemisza), or simply the Thyssen, is an art museum in Madrid, Spain, located near the Prado Museum on one of the city's main boulevards. It is known as part of the "Golden Triangle of Art", which also includes the Prado and the Reina Sofía national galleries. The Thyssen-Bornemisza fills the historical gaps in its counterparts' collections: Italian primitives and works from the English, Dutch and German schools at the Prado; andImpressionists, Expressionists, and European and American paintings from the 20th century at the Reina Sofía.

With over 1,600 paintings, it was once the second largest private collection in the world after the British Royal Collection. A competition was held to house the core of the collection in 1987–88 after Baron Thyssen, having unsuccessfully sought permission to enlarge his museum in Lugano (Villa Favorita), searched for a better-suited location elsewhere in Europe.

== History ==
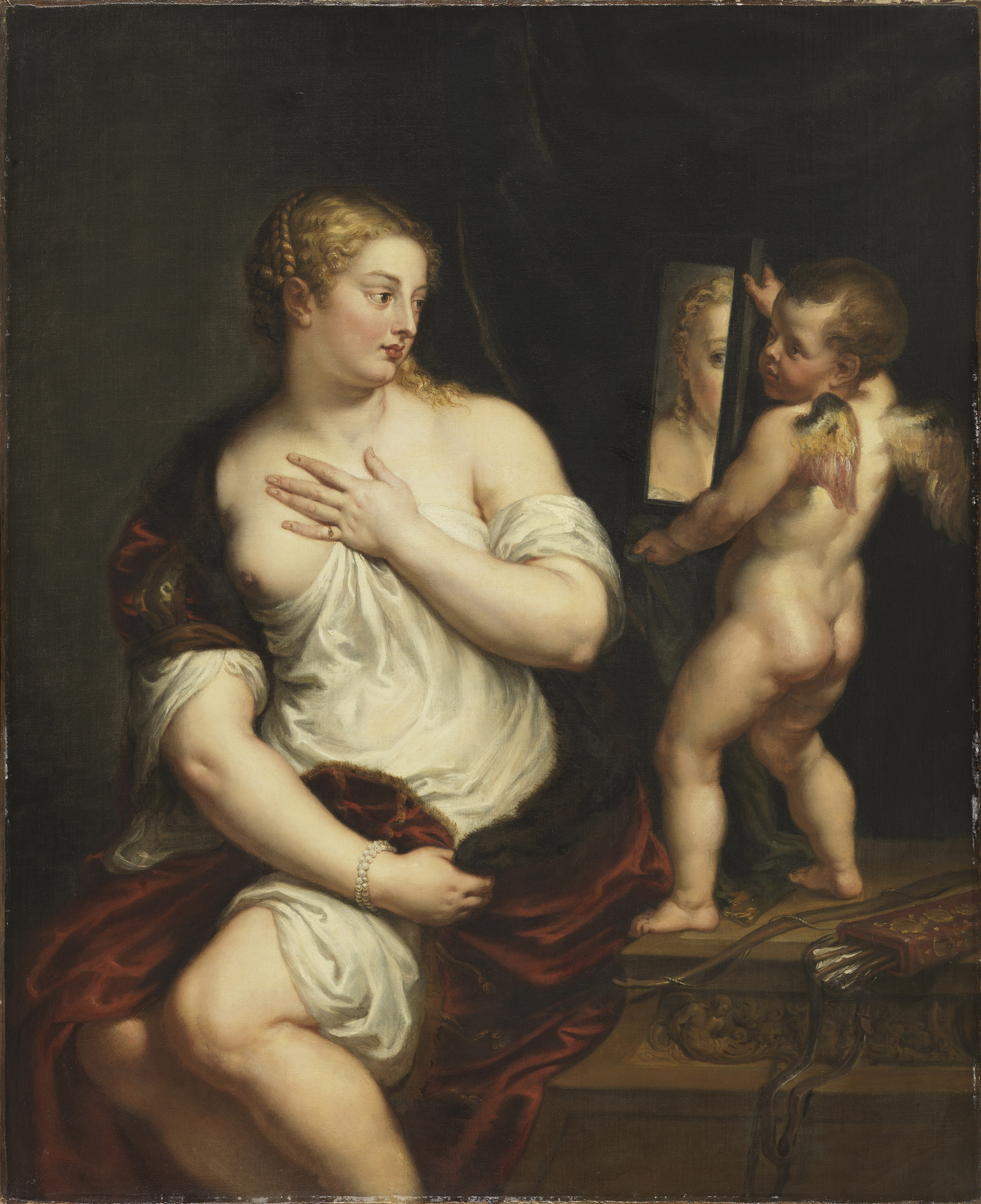
Venus and Cupid holding a mirror – Peter Paul Rubens

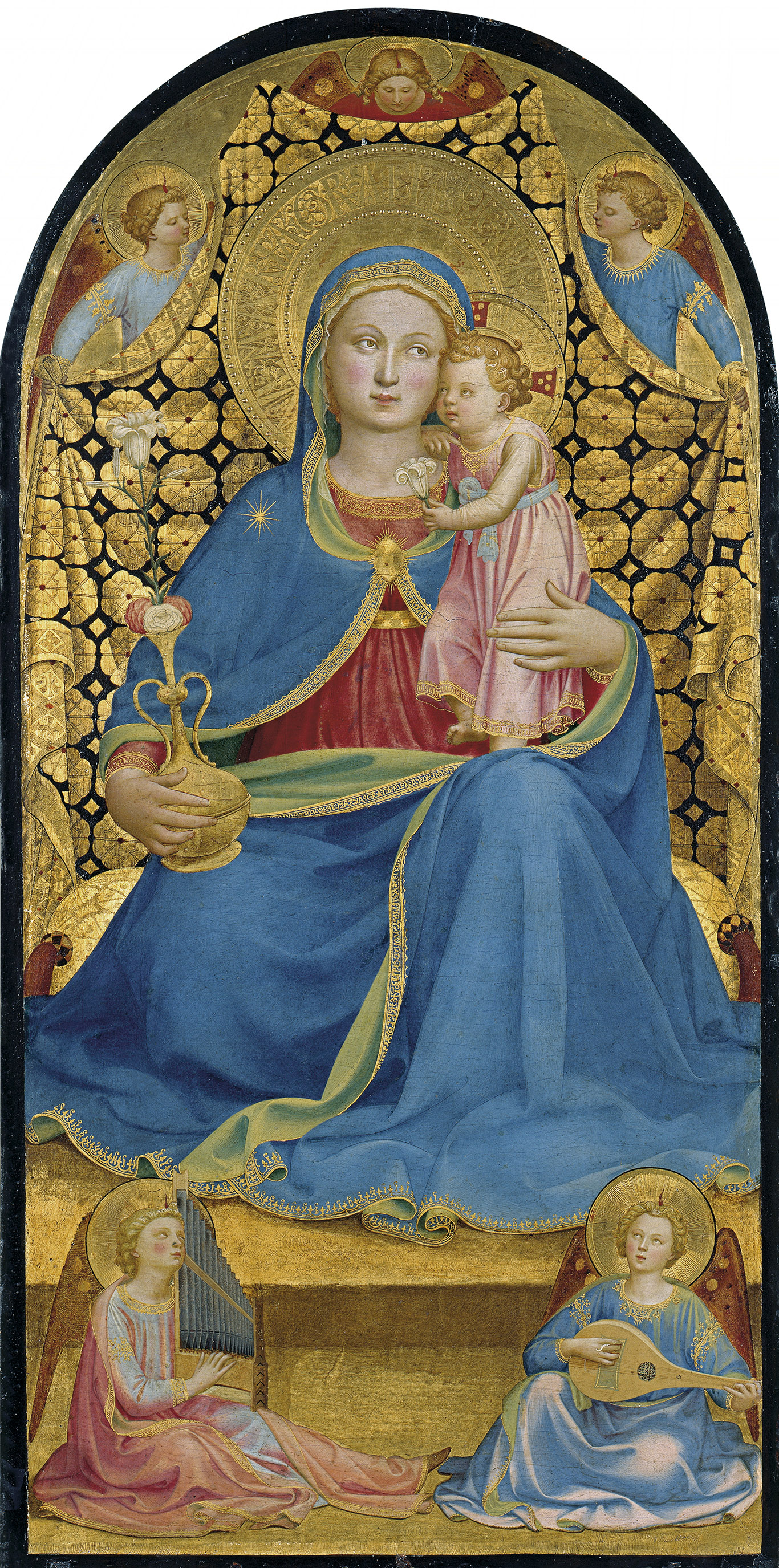
Virgin of Humility - Fra Angelico

The collection was started in the 1920s as a private collection by Heinrich, Baron Thyssen-Bornemisza de Kászon. In a reversal of the movement of European paintings to the US during this period, one of the elder Baron's sources was the collections of American millionaires coping with the Great Depression and inheritance taxes. In this way he acquired old master paintings such as Ghirlandaio's portrait of Giovanna Tornabuoni (once in the Morgan Library) and Carpaccio's Knight (from the collection of Otto Kahn). The collection was later expanded by Heinrich's son Baron Hans Heinrich Thyssen-Bornemisza (1921–2002), who assembled most of the works from his relatives' collections and proceeded to acquire large numbers of new works (from Gothic art to Lucian Freud).

The collection was initially housed in the family estate in Lugano in a twenty-room building modelled after the Neue Pinakothek in Munich. In 1988, the Baron filed a request for building a further extension designed by British architects James Stirling and Michael Wilford, but the plan was rejected by the Lugano City Council.

In 1985, the Baron married Carmen "Tita" Cervera (a former Miss Spain 1961) and introduced her to art collecting. Cervera's influence was decisive in persuading the Baron to relocate the core of his collection to Spain where the local government had a building available next to the Prado. The Thyssen-Bornemisza Museum officially opened in 1992, under the directorship of Tomás Llorens, showing 715 works of art. A year later, the Spanish Government bought 775 works for €300 million. These pieces are now in the purpose-built museum in Madrid. After the museum opened, in 1999, Cervera loaned 429 works of her own art collection to the museum for 11 years. The loan was renewed annually for free from 2012 to 2021.

The Baroness remains involved with the museum. She personally decided the salmon pink tone of the interior walls and in May 2006, publicly demonstrated against plans of the Mayor of Madrid, Alberto Ruiz-Gallardón to redevelop the Paseo del Prado as she thought the works and traffic would damage the collection and the museum's appearance.

In 2015, the Baroness delayed the annual renewal of her loan while deciding whether or not to temporarily move her collection for a fee to a museum in Barcelona, the United States, or Russia. She eventually decided to keep the collection in Madrid, but in 2017, she again delayed signing the agreement. In 2021, the Ministry of Culture officially finalized an agreement to borrow the collection (valued at €1B) for an annual fee of €6.5 million over the course of 15 years.

== The collection ==
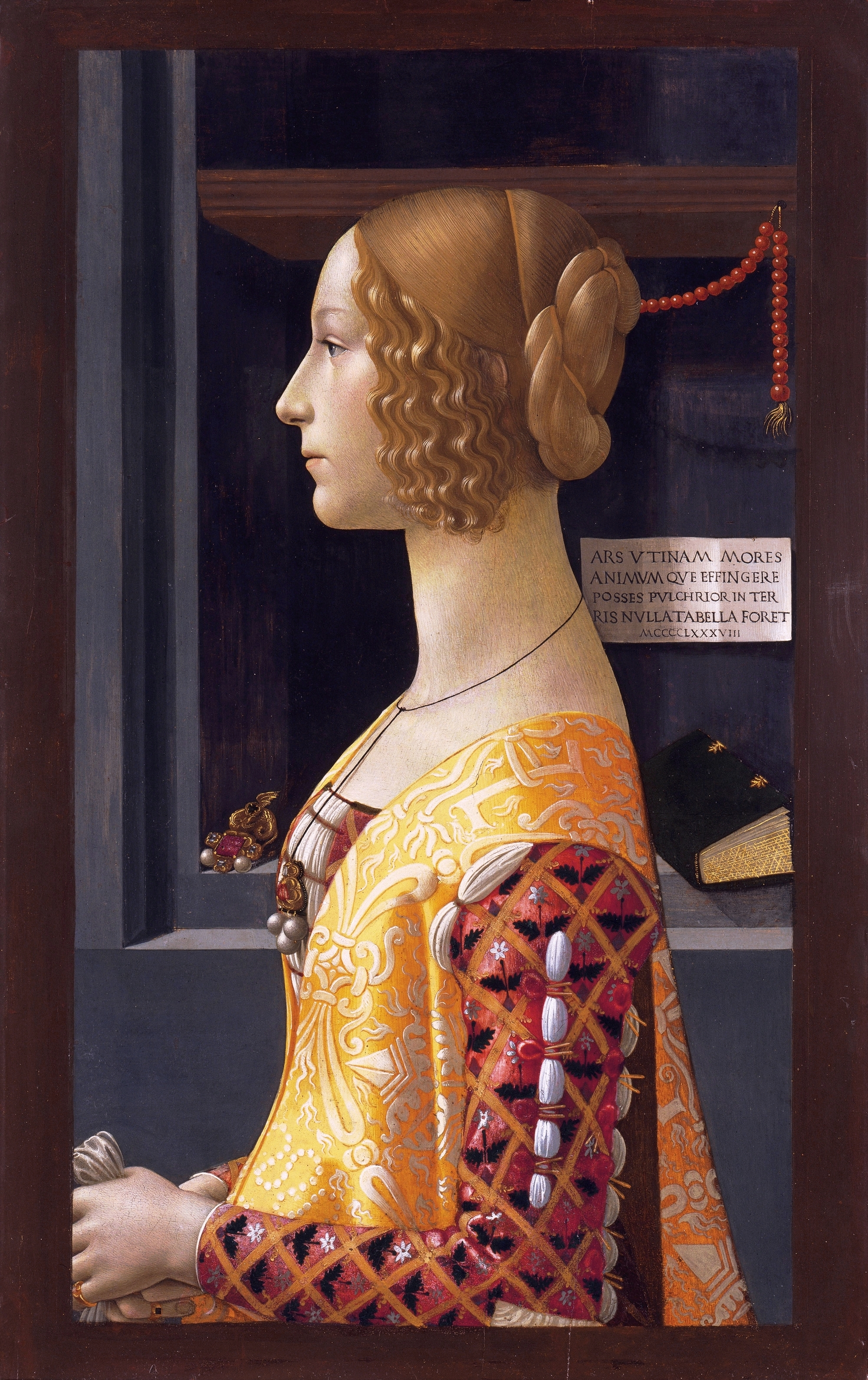
Portrait of Giovanna Tornabuoni – Domenico Ghirlandaio (1489–'90)

The Old Masters were mainly bought by the elder Baron, while Hans focused more on the 19th and 20th century, resulting in a collection that spans eight centuries of European painting, without claiming to give an all-encompassing view but rather a series of highlights.

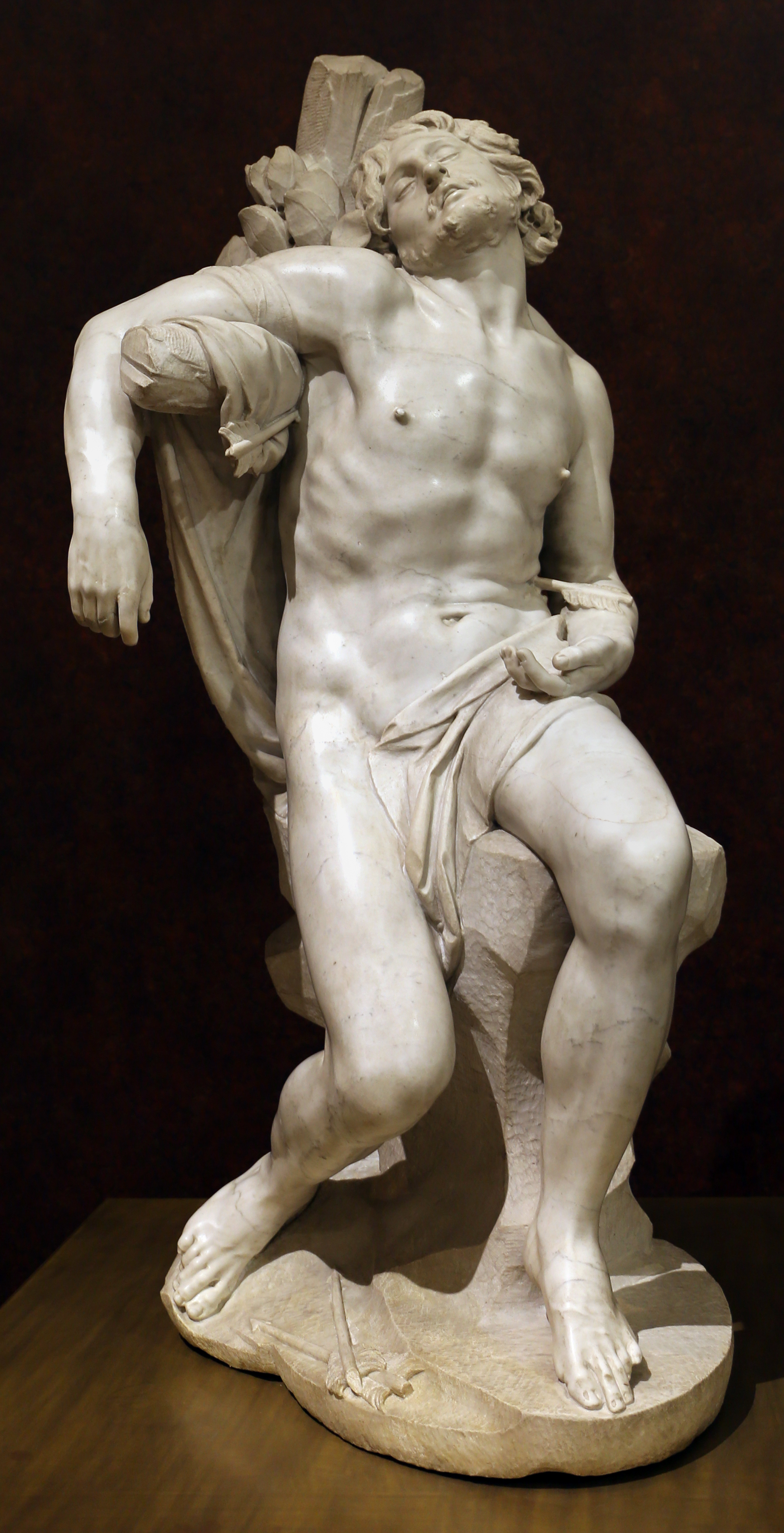
Saint Sebastian – Gian Lorenzo Bernini (c. 1616–'17). Work exhibited on loan from a private collection.

One of the focal points is the early European painting, with a major collection of trecento and quattrocento (i.e. 14th and 15th century) Italian paintings by Duccio, Luca di Tommè, Bernardo Daddi, Paolo Uccello, Benozzo Gozzoli and his contemporaries, and works of the early Flemish and Dutch painters like Jan van Eyck (Diptich of the Annunciation), Petrus Christus (Madonna of the Dry Tree), Robert Campin, Rogier van der Weyden, Gerard David and Hans Memling.

Other highlights include works by leading Renaissance, Baroque and Rococo painters, including Antonello da Messina (Portrait of a Man), Francesco del Cossa, Bramantino (Christus Dolens), Fra Bartolomeo, Giulio Romano, Giovanni Bellini, Palma il Vecchio, Titian, Tintoretto, Veronese, Jacopo Bassano, Sebastiano del Piombo (Portrait of Ferry Carondelet), Bernardino Luini, Agnolo Bronzino, Domenico Beccafumi, Albrecht Dürer (Christ among the Doctors), Hans Baldung Grien, Lucas Cranach the Elder, Hans Holbein (Portrait of Henry VIII), Albrecht Altdorfer, El Greco, Caravaggio (Saint Catherine), Guercino, Sebastiano Ricci, Rubens, Van Dyck, Murillo, Rembrandt, Frans Hals (Family Portrait in a Landscape), Simon Vouet, Claude Lorrain, Canaletto, Francesco Guardi, Tiepolo, Giambattista Pittoni, Watteau, François Boucher, Chardin, Fragonard, Gainsborough and Pompeo Batoni, as well as two famous portraits by Domenico Ghirlandaio (Giovanna Tornabuoni) and Vittore Carpaccio (Knight in a landscape).

The Museum houses a display of North American paintings from 18th and 19th centuries, including works by Copley, Winslow Homer, John Singer Sargent.

The display of the European 19th century starts with works by Francisco Goya, Thomas Lawrence, Delacroix, Géricault, Corot and Courbet. There are Impressionist and Post-Impressionist works by the artists Claude Monet, Auguste Renoir, Edgar Degas, Camille Pissarro, Alfred Sisley, Berthe Morisot, Pierre Bonnard, Toulouse-Lautrec, Paul Gauguin, Cézanne, and Vincent van Gogh. The large collection of twentieth-century modern art includes Cubist works by Picasso, Braque and Juan Gris, as well as paintings by Edvard Munch, Egon Schiele, James Ensor, Kandinsky, Salvador Dalí, Paul Klee, Chagall, Magritte, Piet Mondrian, Edward Hopper, Jackson Pollock, Mark Rothko, Roy Lichtenstein, Willem de Kooning and Francis Bacon. The selection of German Expressionism is extensive, and includes works by Emil Nolde, Ernst Ludwig Kirchner, August Macke, Max Beckmann, George Grosz, and Otto Dix.

A collection of works from the museum (Fra Angelico, Cranach, Titian, Canaletto, Rubens) is housed in Barcelona in the Museu Nacional d'Art de Catalunya.

=== Rue Saint-Honoré in the Afternoon, Effect of Rain ===
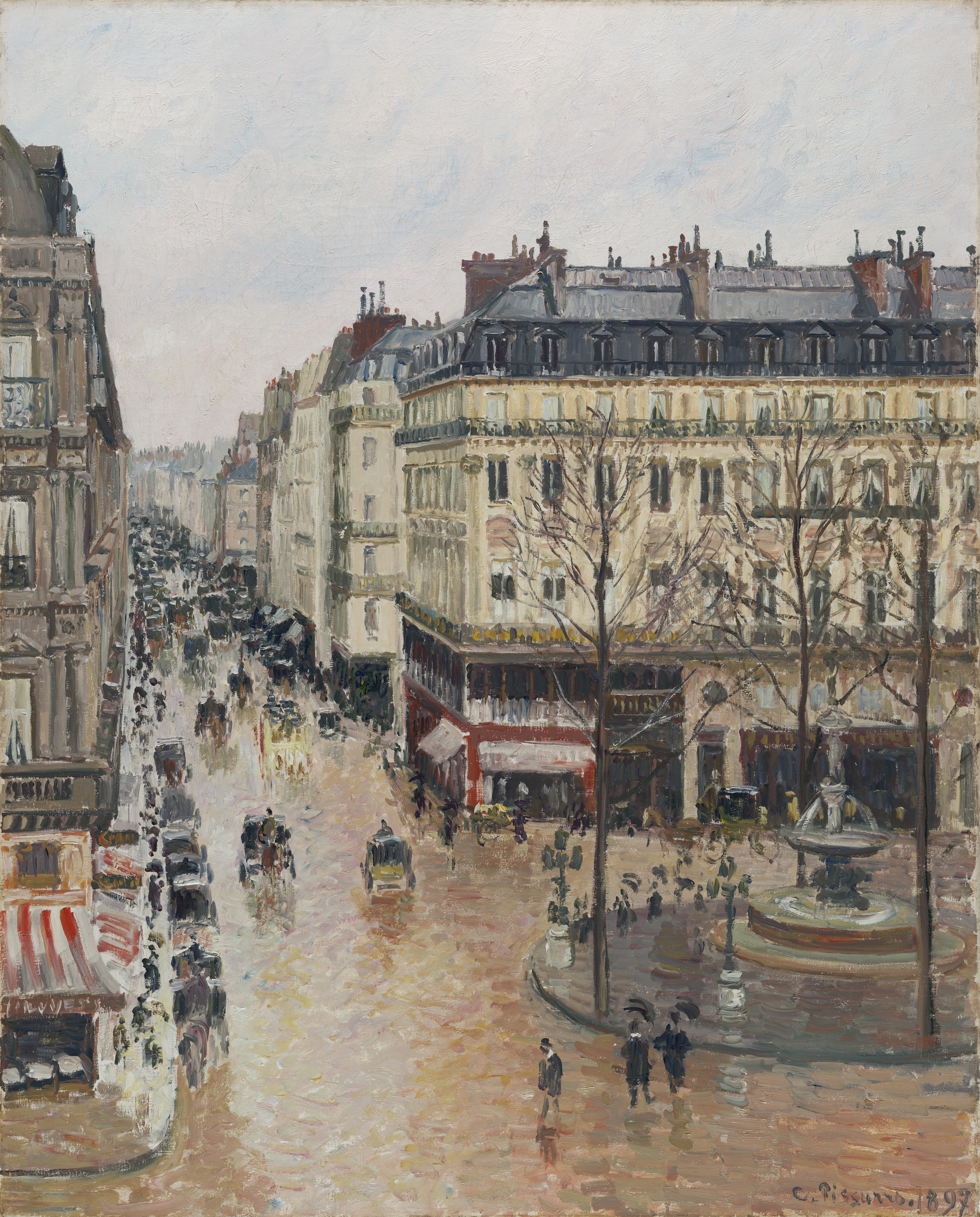
Rue Saint-Honoré in the Afternoon. Effect of Rain – Camille Pissarro (1897)

One painting, Rue Saint-Honoré in the Afternoon. Effect of Rain by Camille Pissarro, belonged to a Jewish woman, Lilly Cassirer, who was compelled by a Nazi official to sell it under duress for an exit visa to escape Nazi Germany shortly after Kristallnacht in 1939. In 1958, a German court awarded Lilly Cassirer Neubauer compensation of DM 120,000, the fair market value for the work.

By 2015, her descendants had filed a lawsuit against the museum, on the grounds that the painting had been looted by the Nazis. On 1 May 2019, a California judge determined that the museum held the right to keep the painting.

The case was heard by the United States Supreme Court on 18 January 2022. The Supreme Court ruled that California law on choice-of-law should apply to the suit. On remand, the Ninth Circuit affirmed the district court's judgment in favour of the Thyssen-Bornemisza Collection in an action under the Foreign Sovereign Immunities Act. Motivated by this verdict, Jesse Gabriel, co-chair of the California Legislative Jewish Caucus, authored Assembly Bill 2867, which aims to help California residents recover art and other personal property stolen during the Holocaust or other acts of genocide or persecution. The bill was passed in August 2024. The United States Supreme Court in March 2025 vacated the Ninth circuit decision and ordered the Ninth Circuit to review the case in light of the new California law. The Ninth Circuit then remanded the case to the trial court to review the effect of Assembly Bill 2867.

== Selected collection highlights ==
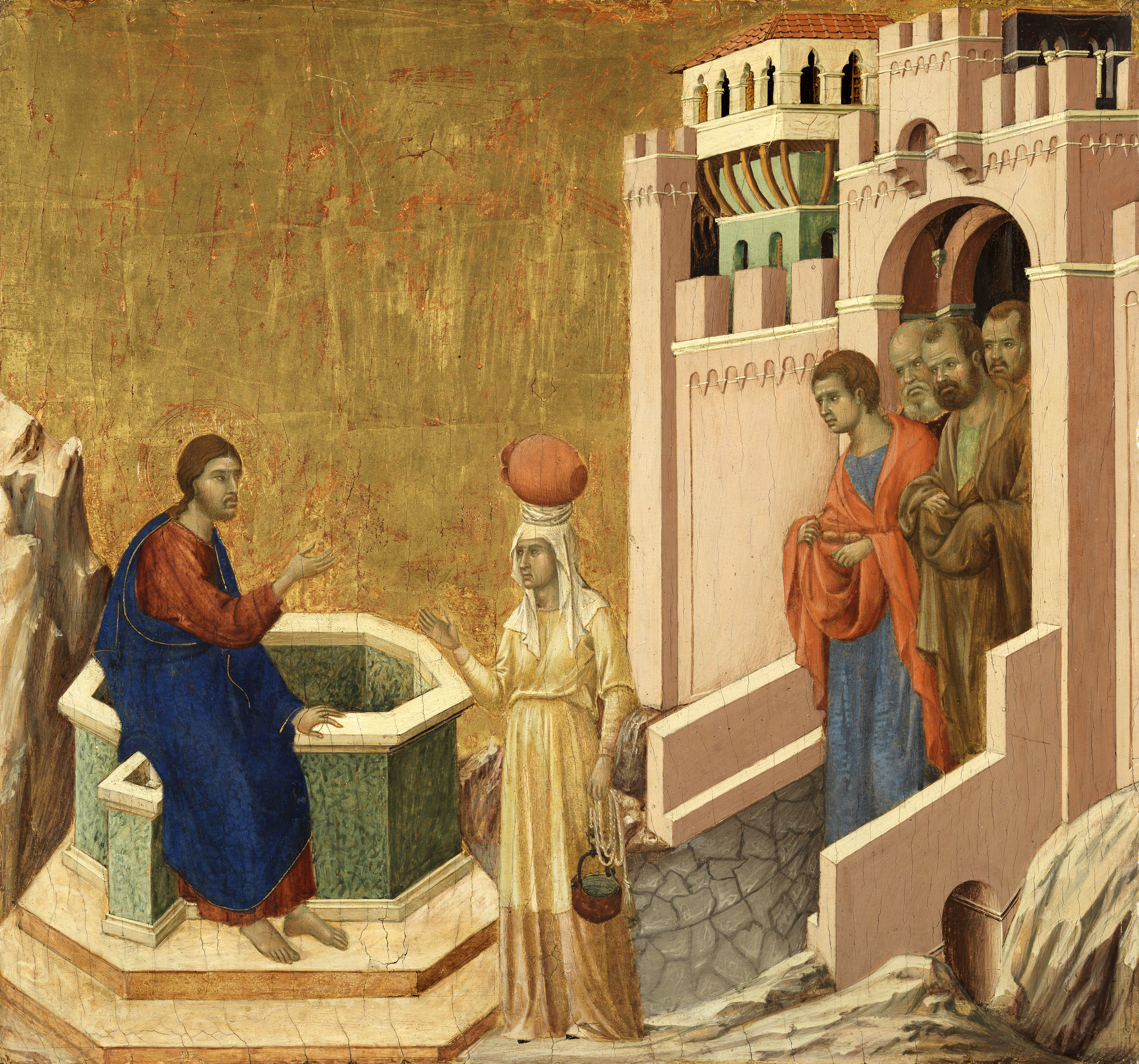
Christ and the Samaritan – Duccio 1310-11

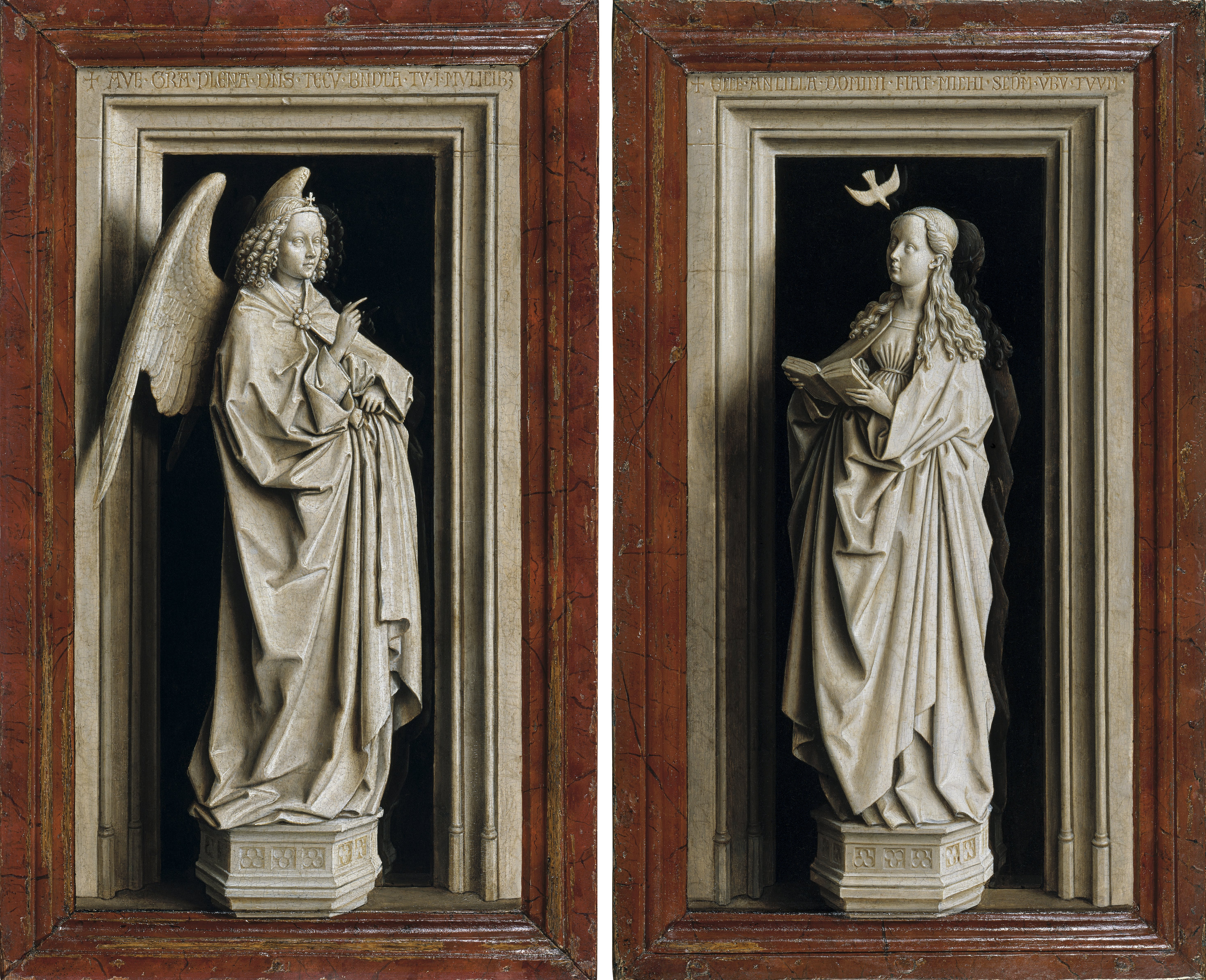
Annunciation – Jan van Eyck 1433-35

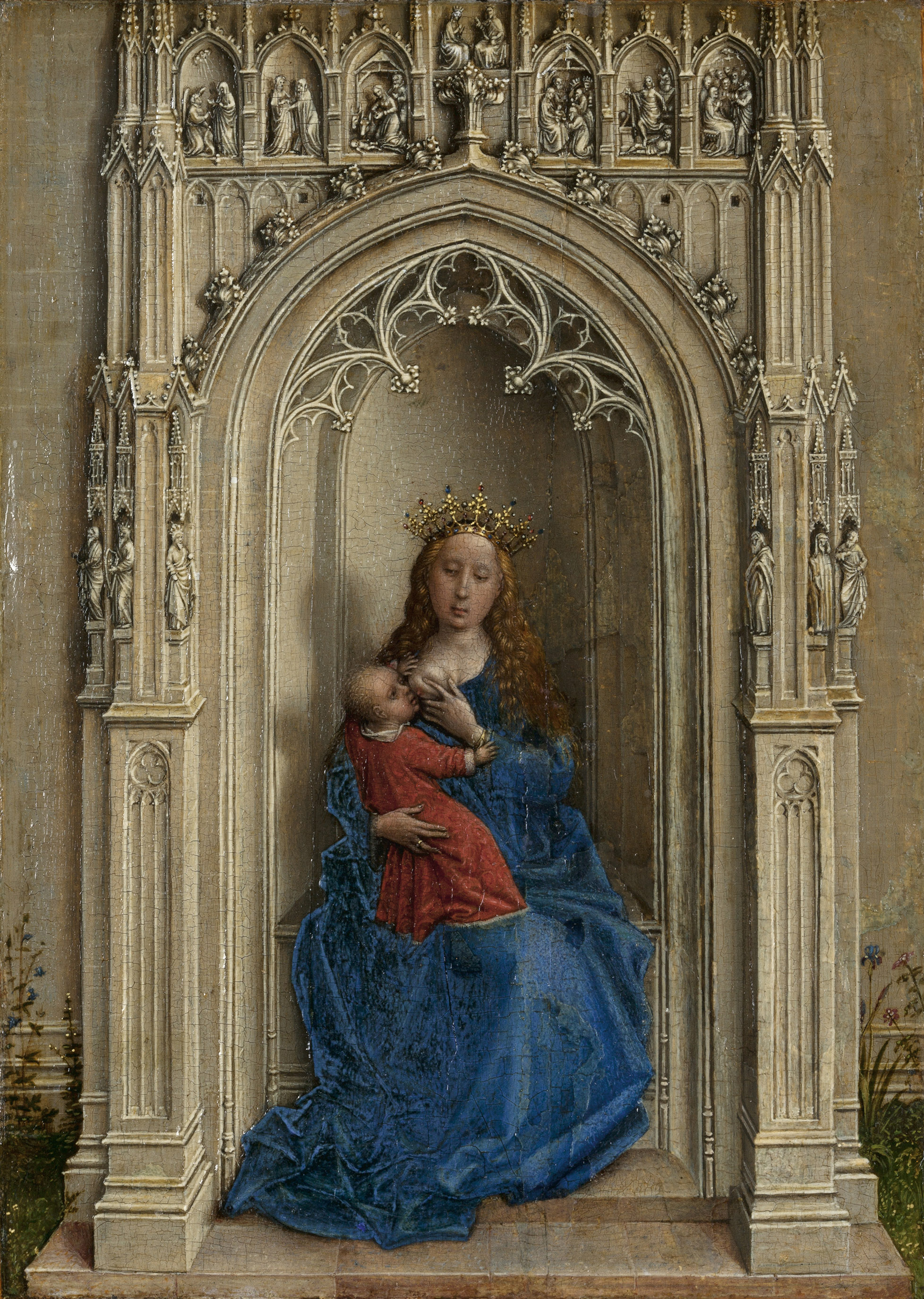
Virgin and Child Enthroned – Rogier van der Weyden c.1433

Young Knight in a Landscape – Vittore Carpaccio 1505

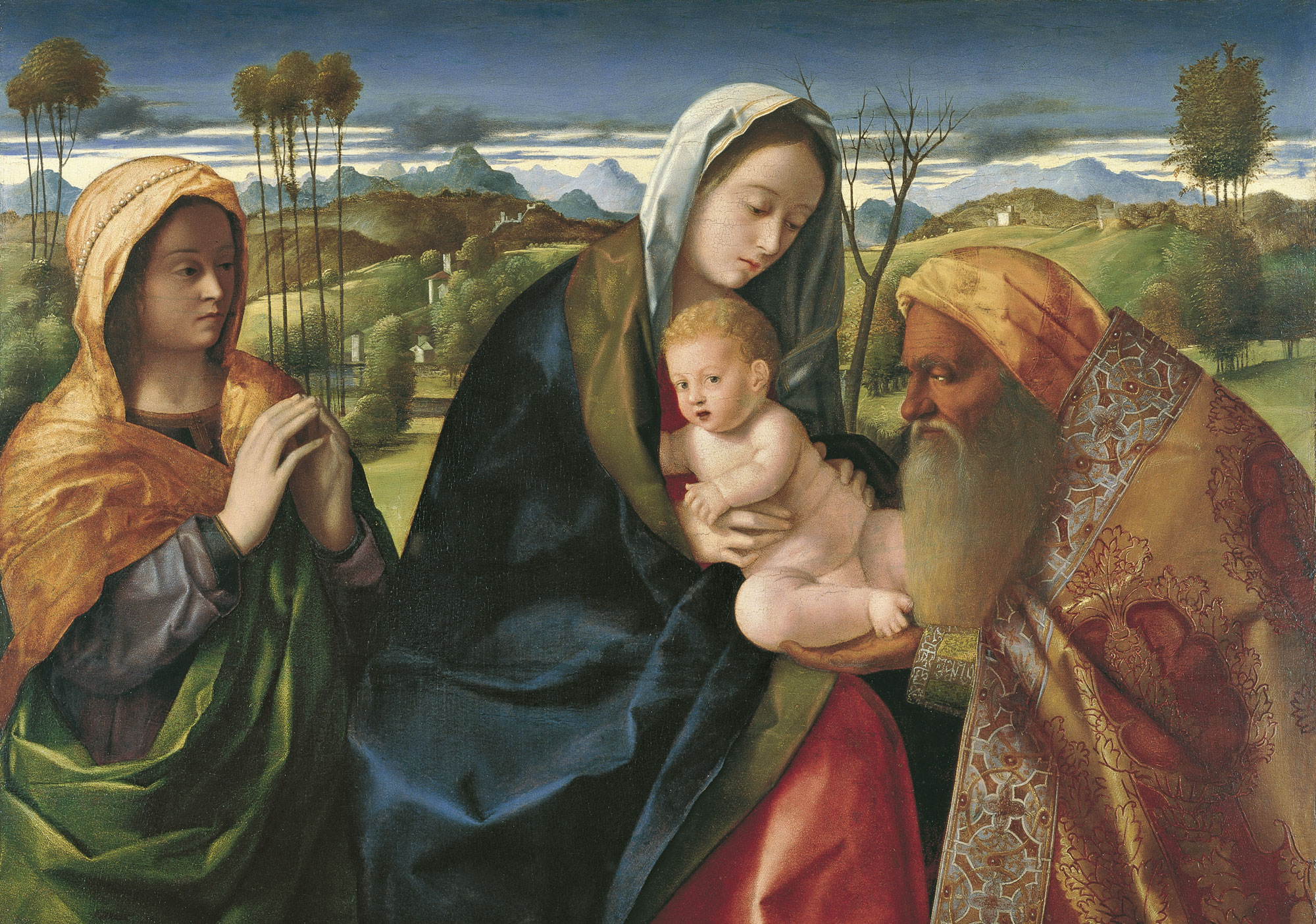
Sacred Conversation – Giovanni Bellini 1505-10

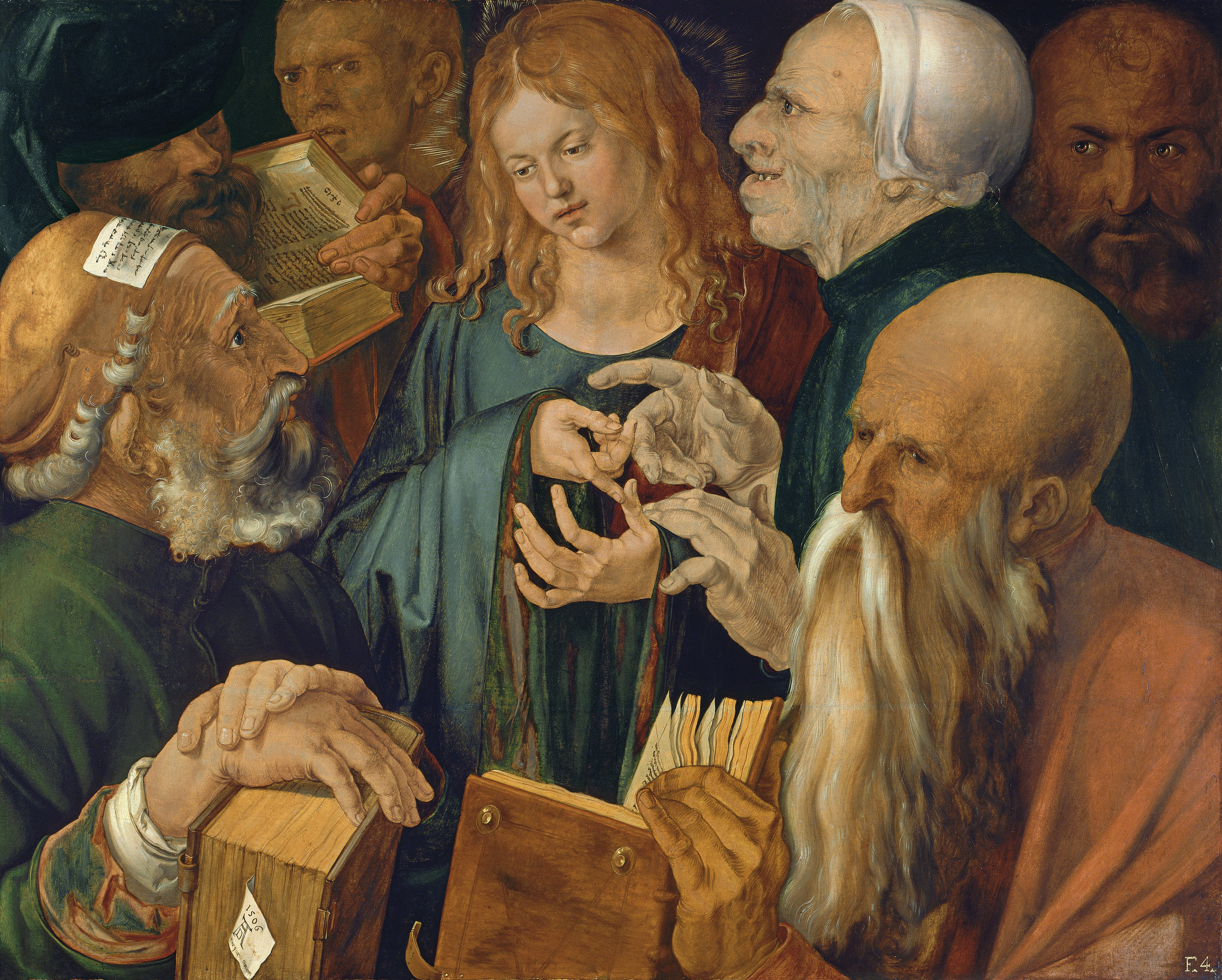
Christ among the Doctors – Albrecht Dürer 1506

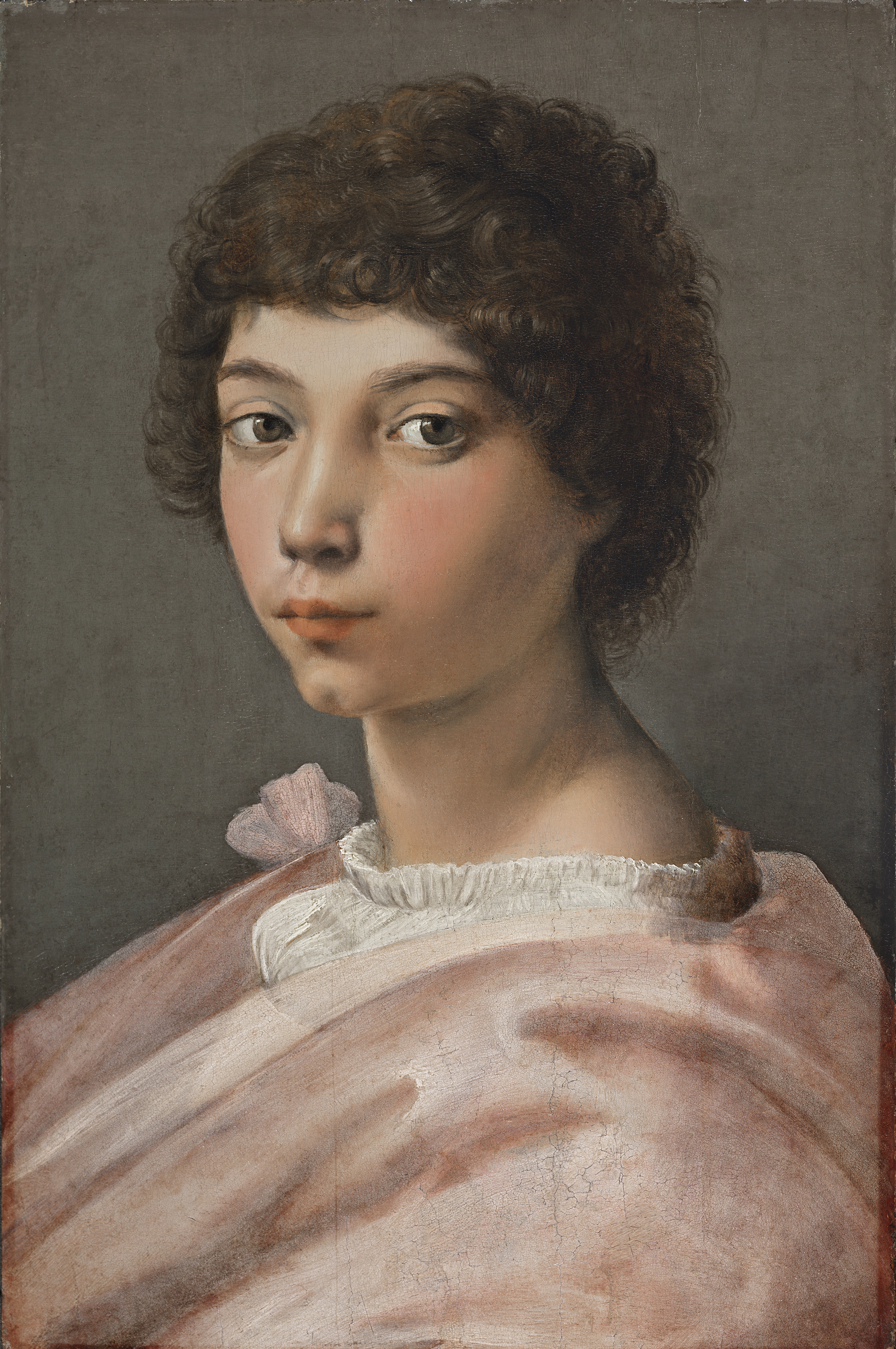
Portrait of a Young Man – Raphael 1518-19

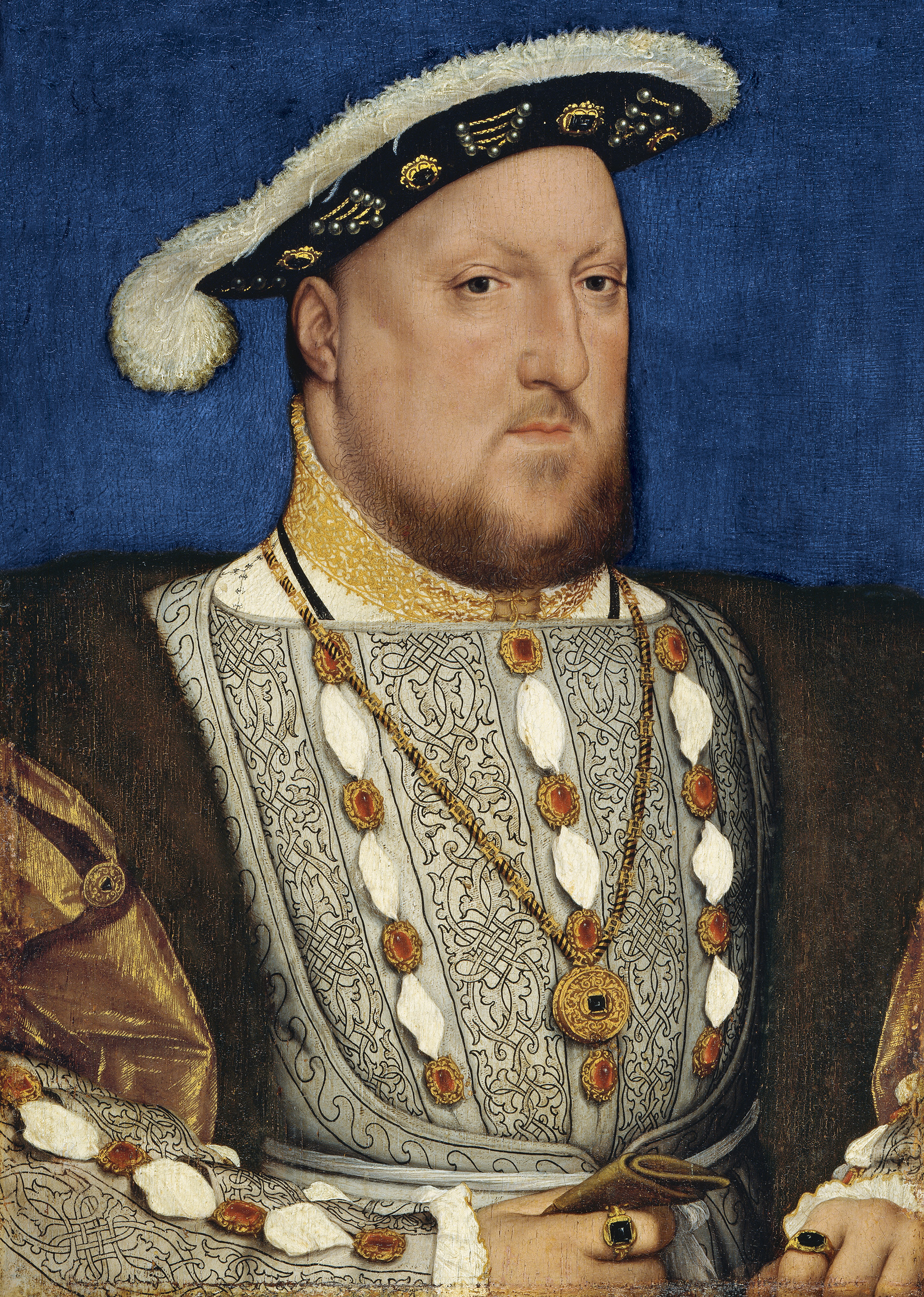
Portrait of Henry VIII – Hans Holbein c.1537

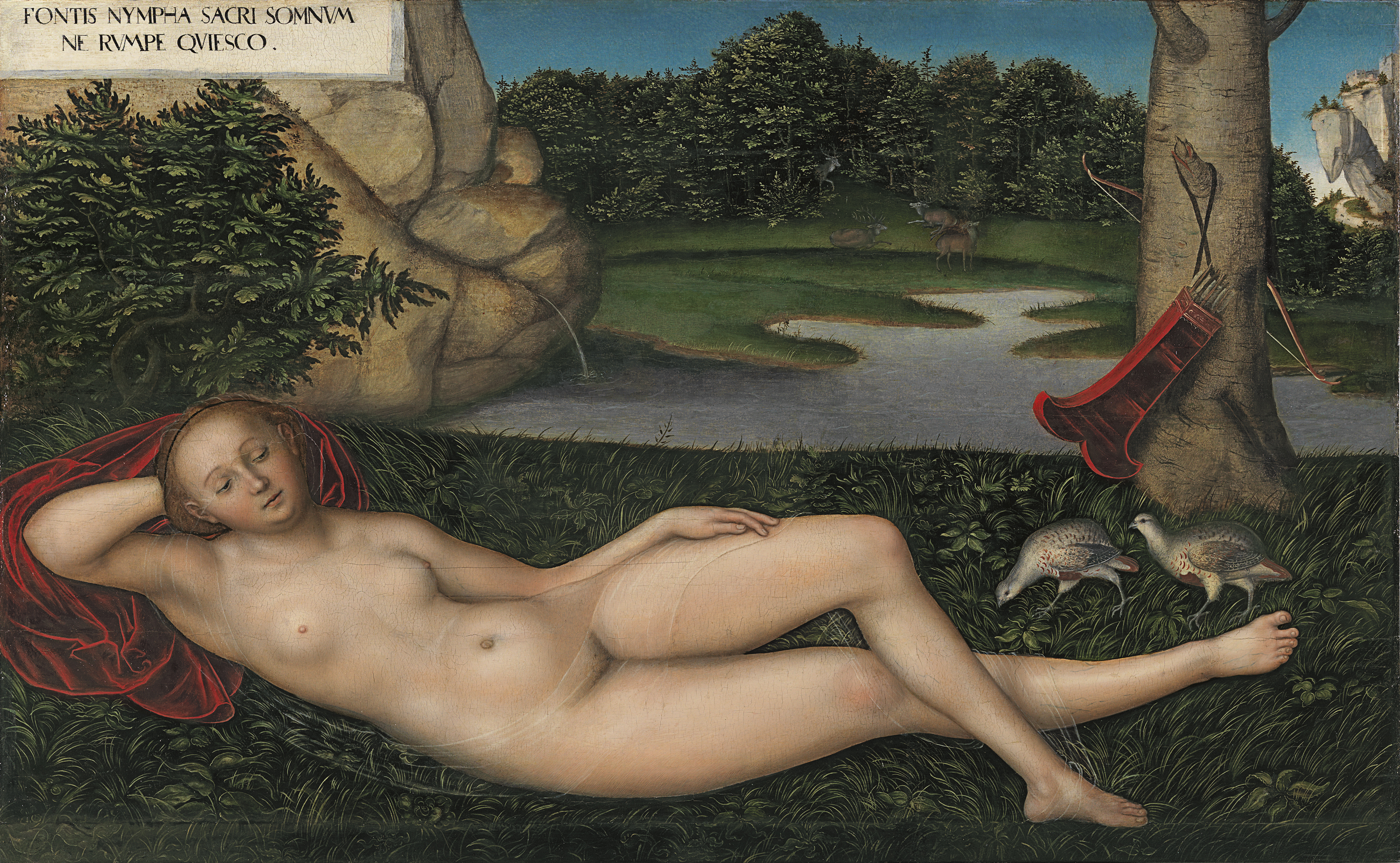
Spring nymph at the fountain – Lucas Cranach the Elder 1530-34

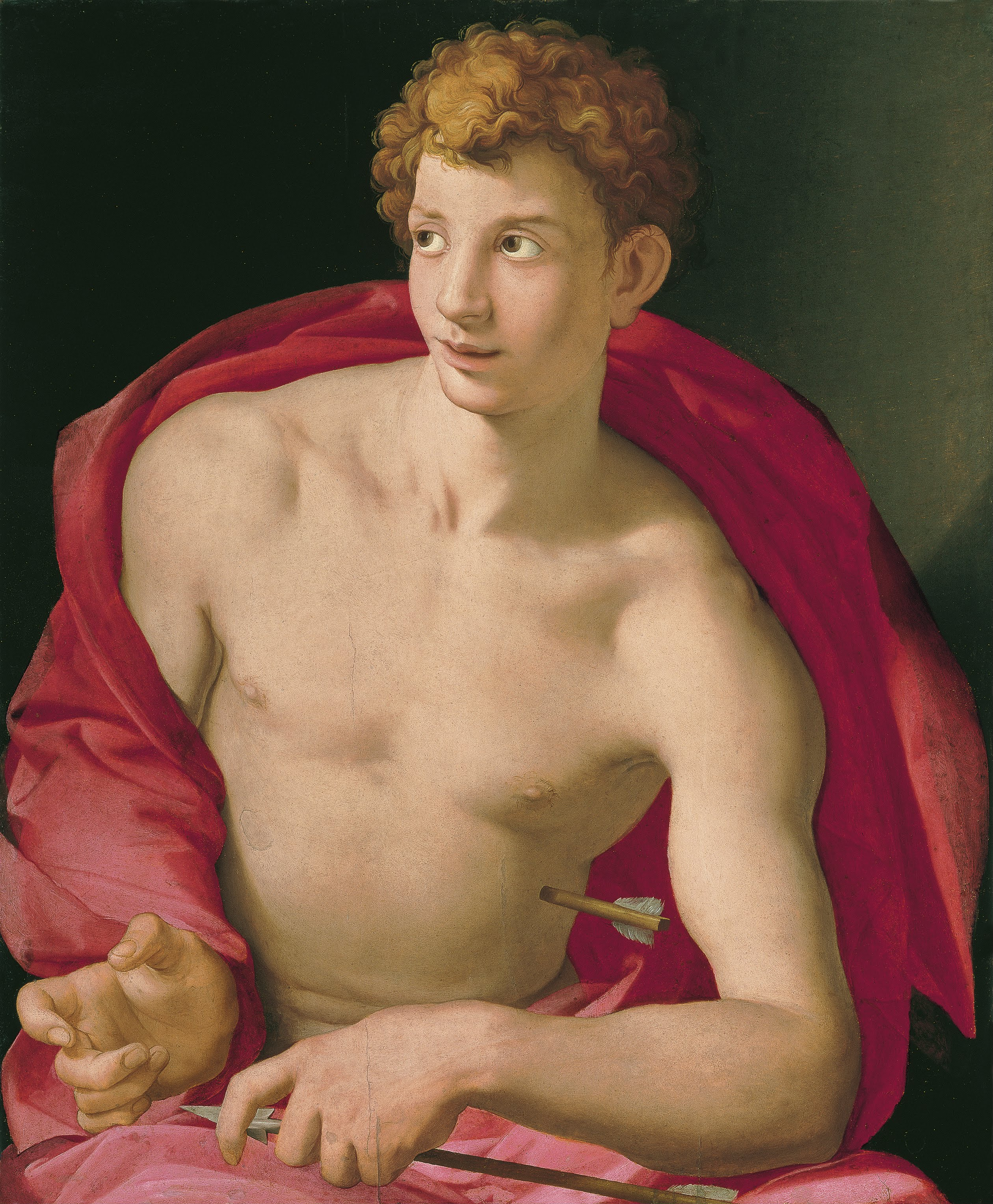
Saint Sebastian – Bronzino 1533

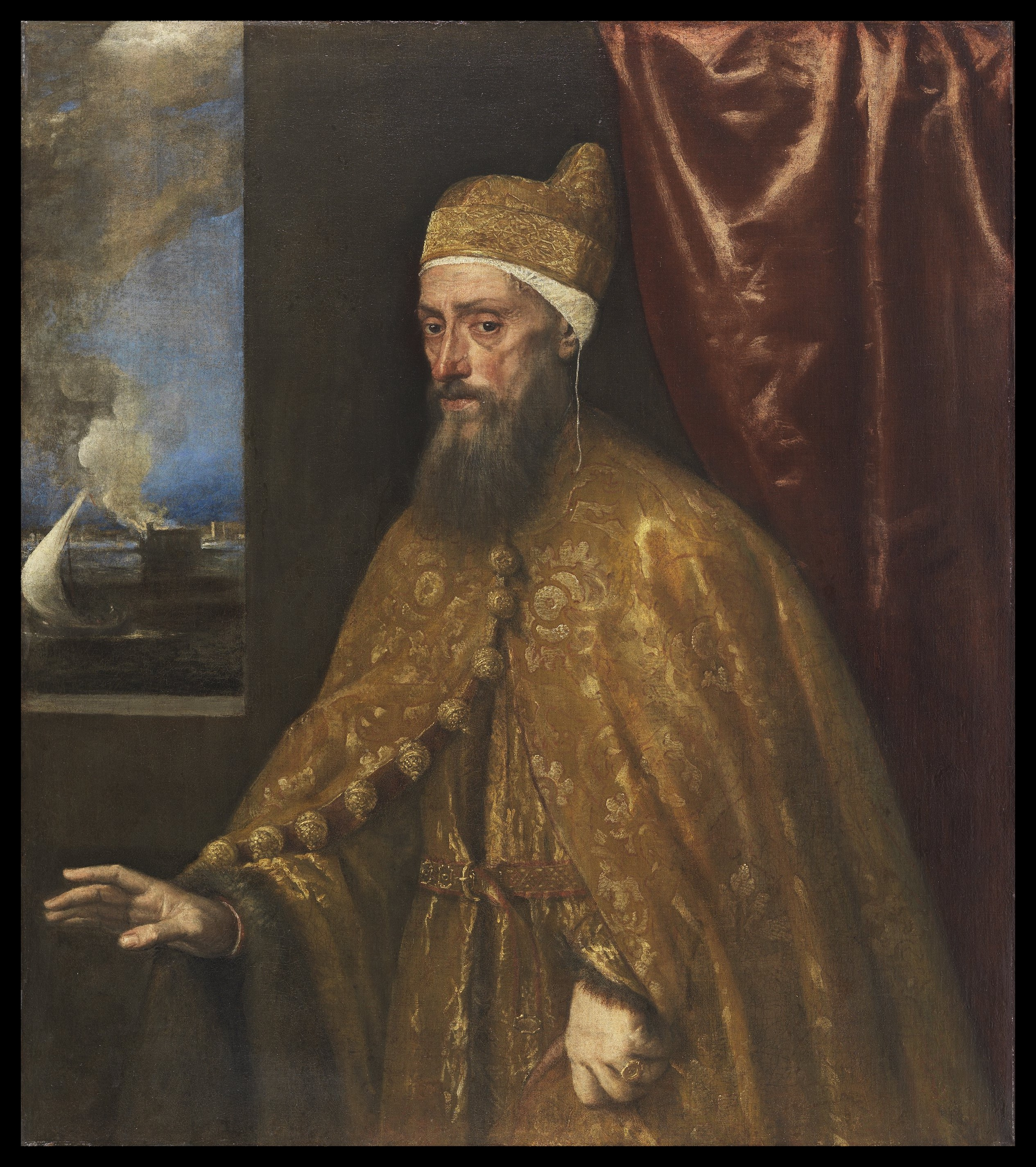
Portrait of Dux Francesco Venier – Titian 1554-56

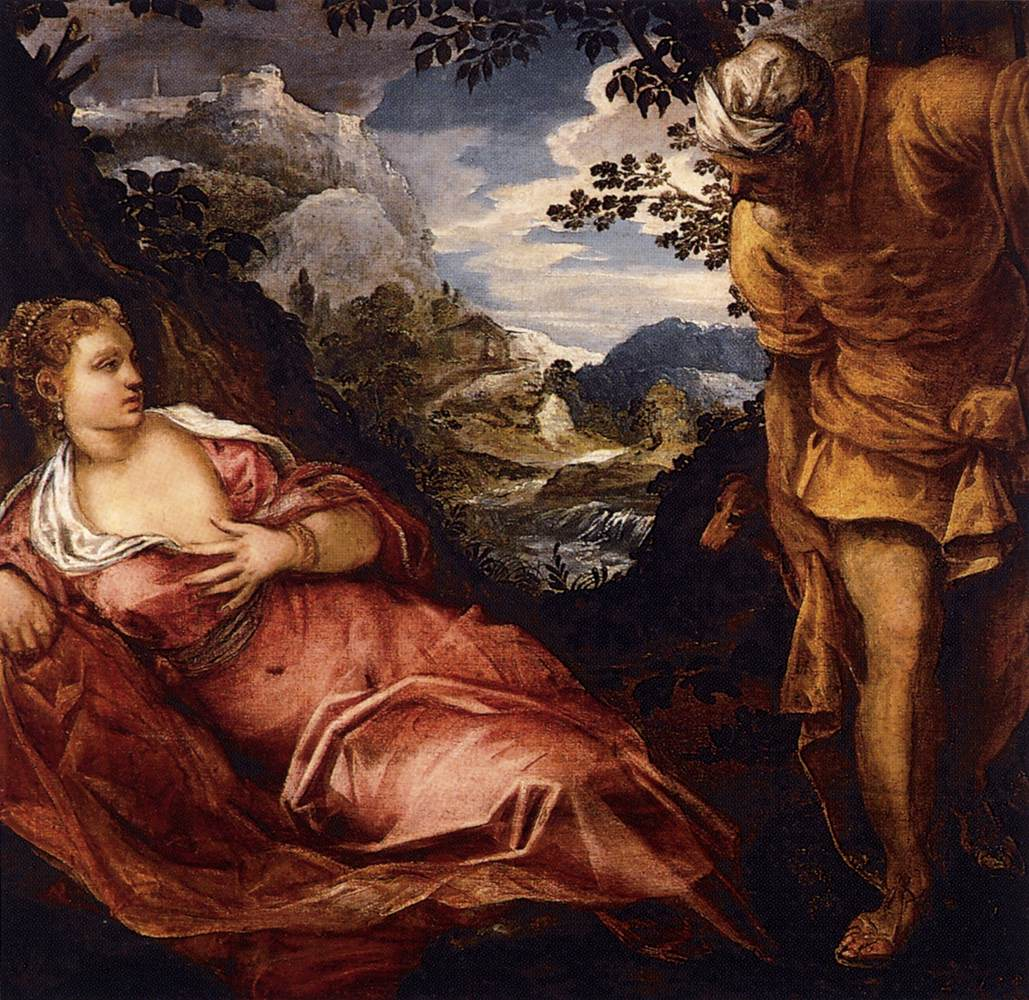
The Meeting of Tamar and Judah - Tintoretto 1555-59

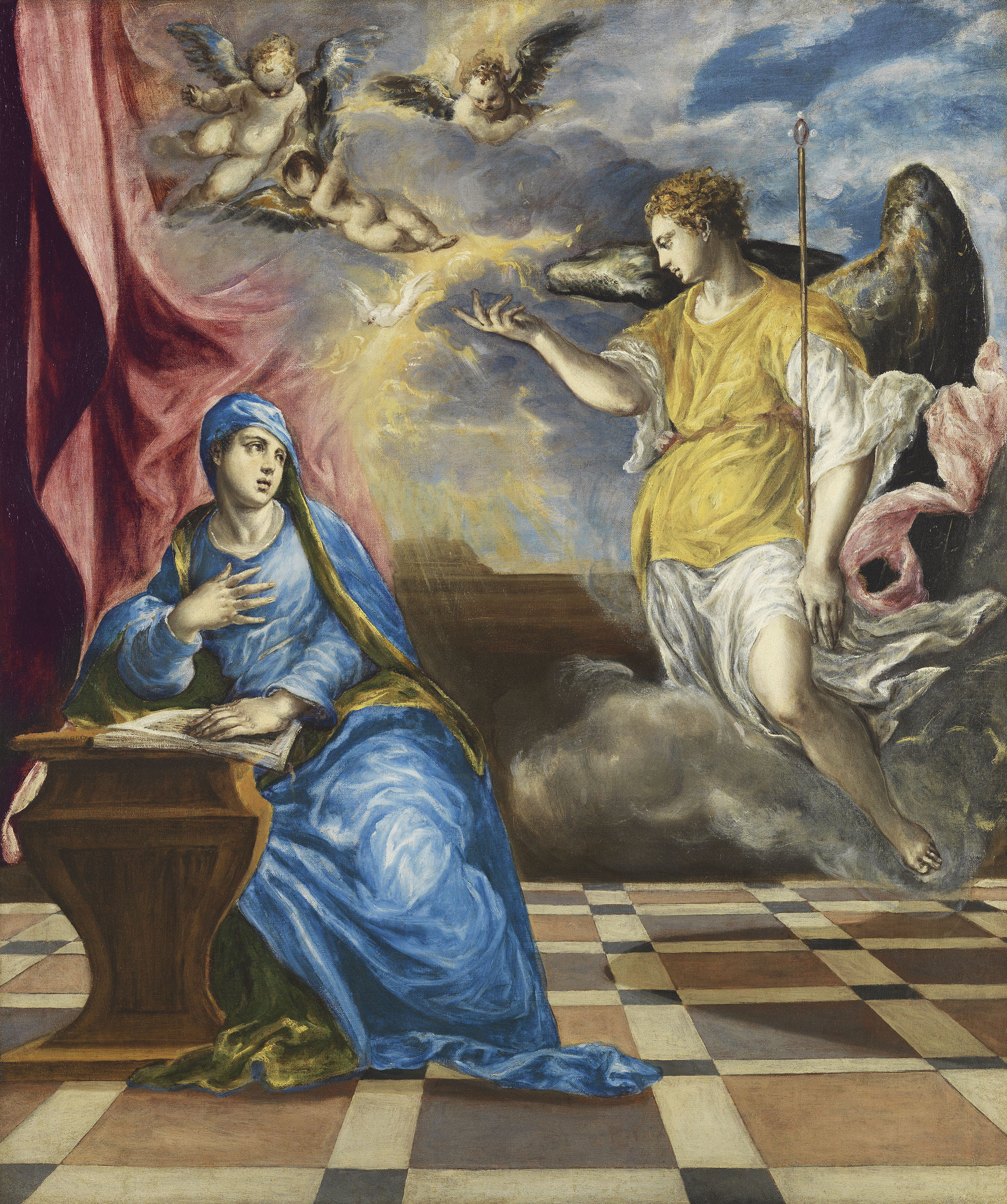
Annunciation – El Greco c.1576

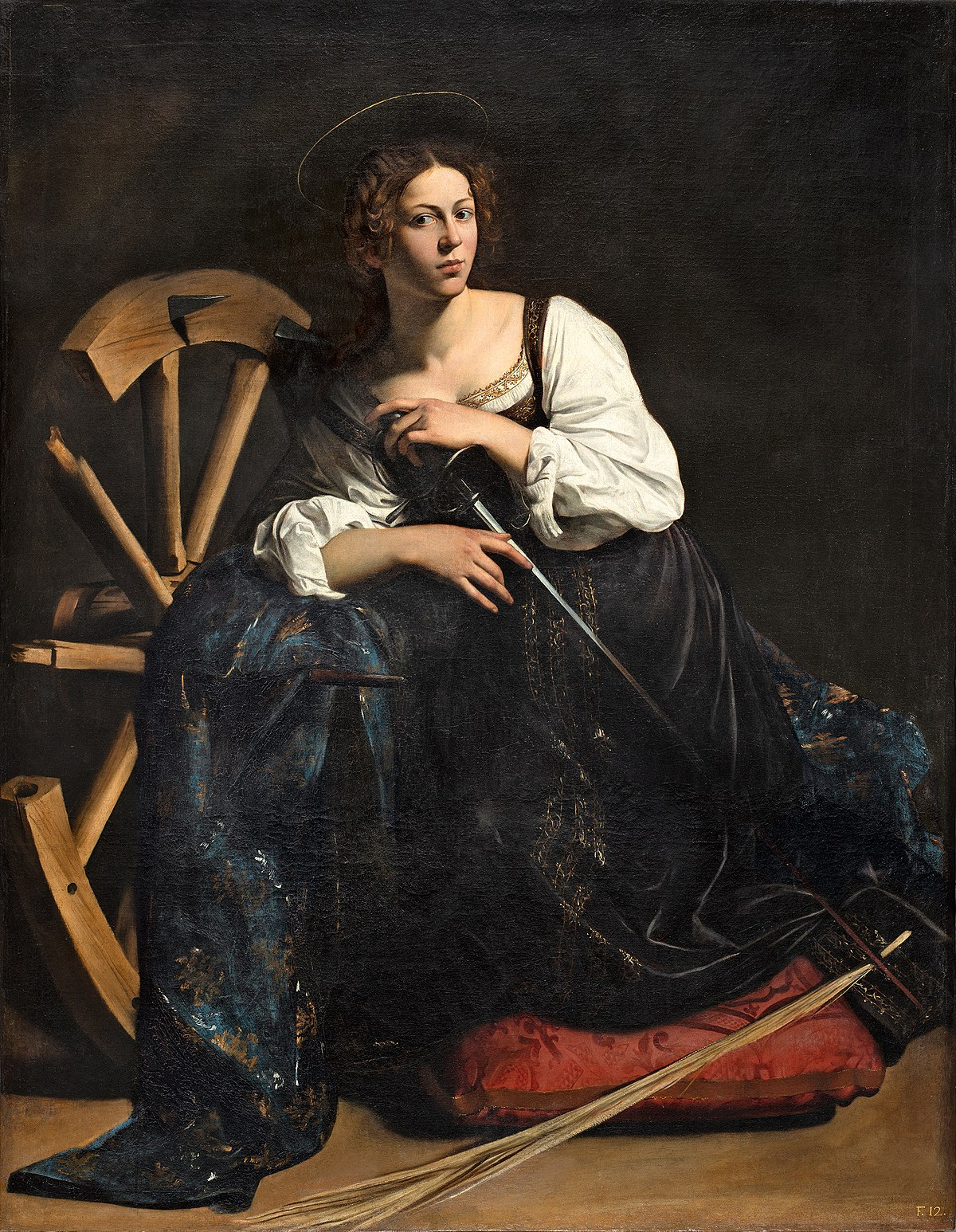
Saint Catherine – Caravaggio 1598-99

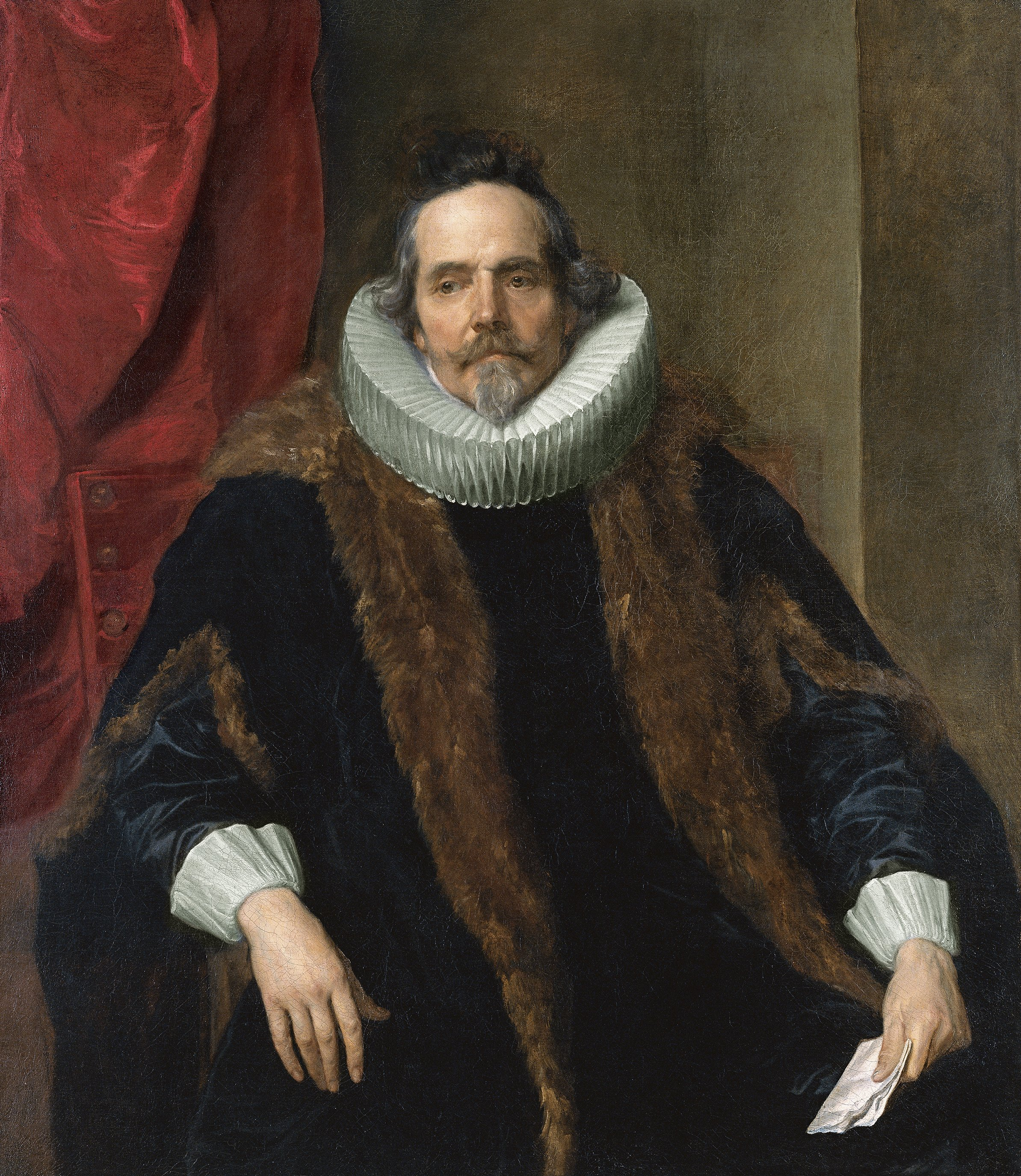
Portrait of Jacques Le Roy – Anthony van Dyck 1631

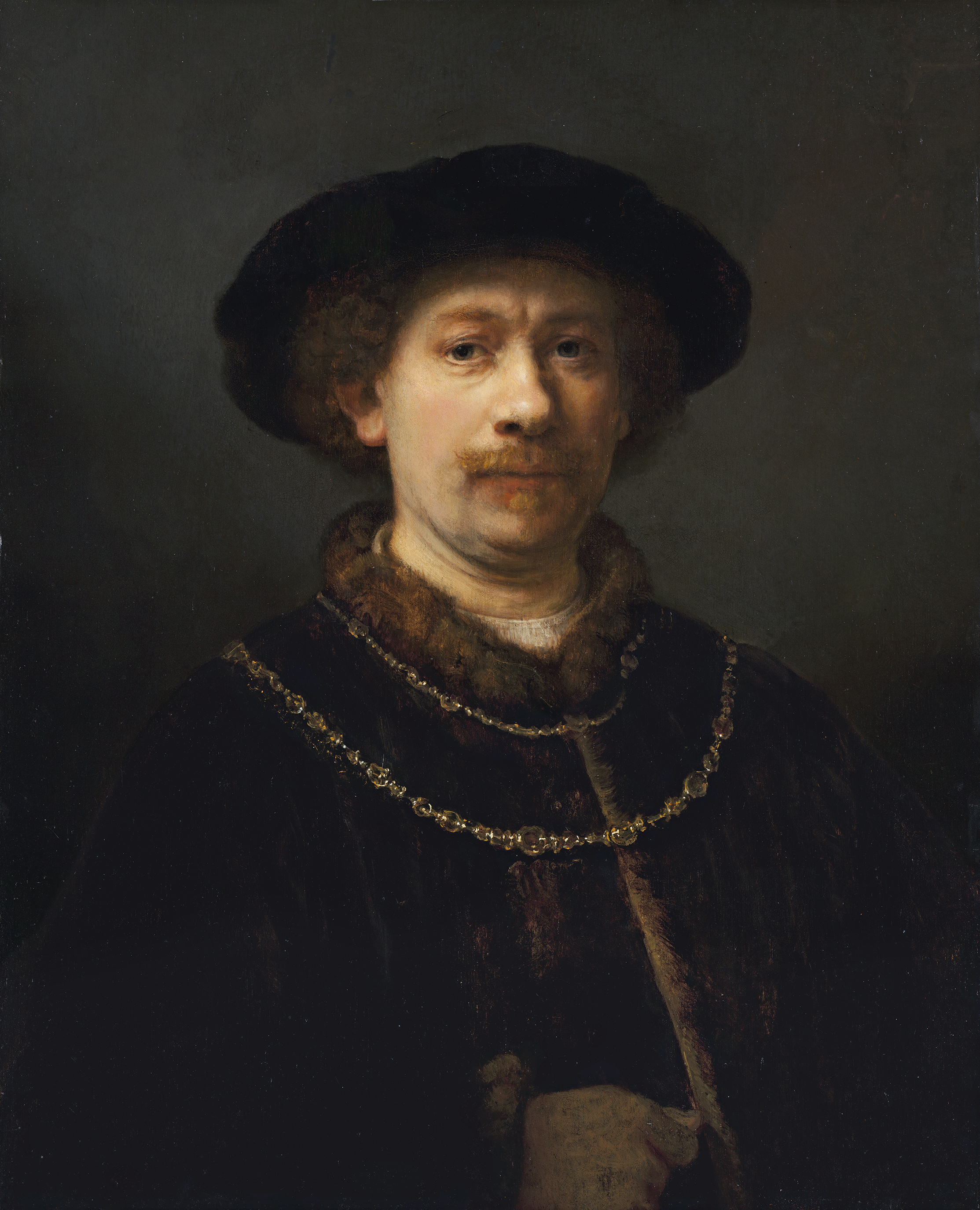
Self-portrait wearing a Hat and two Chains – Rembrandt 1642-43

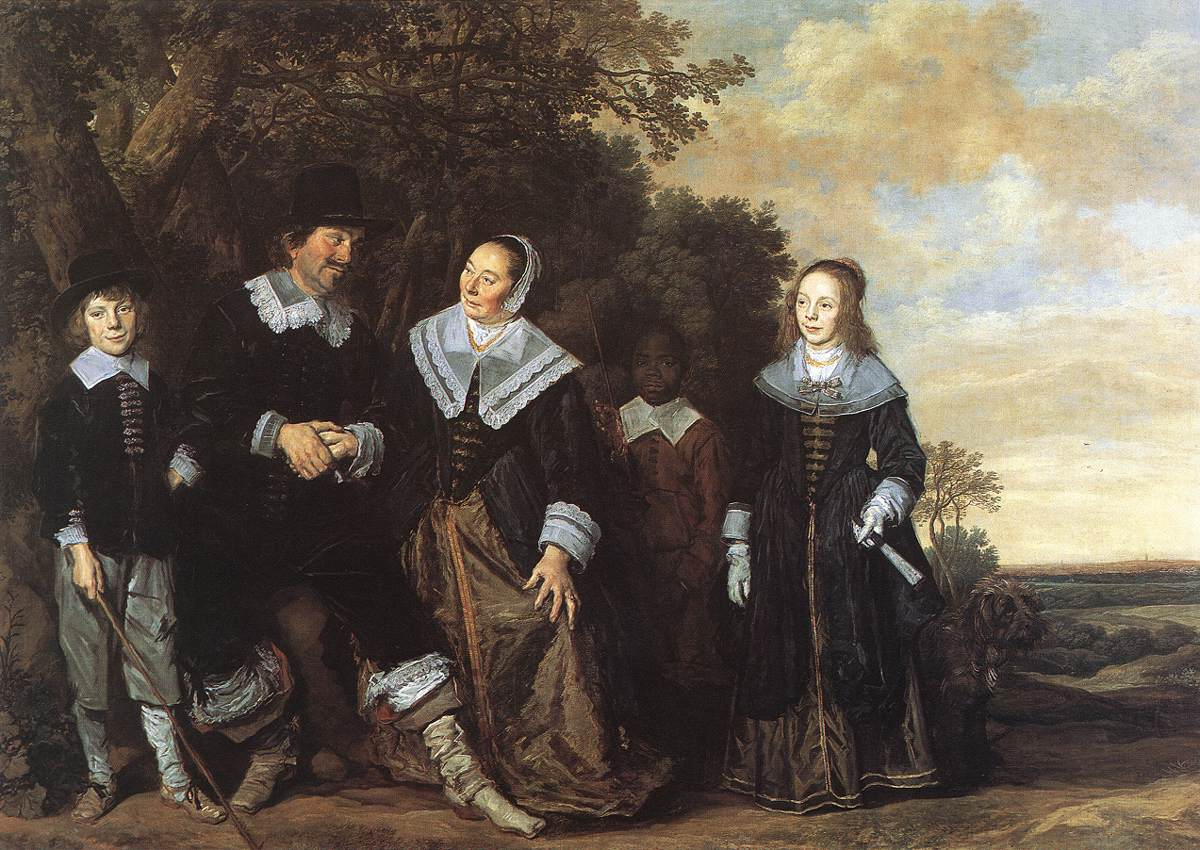
Family Group in a Landscape – Frans Hals 1645-48

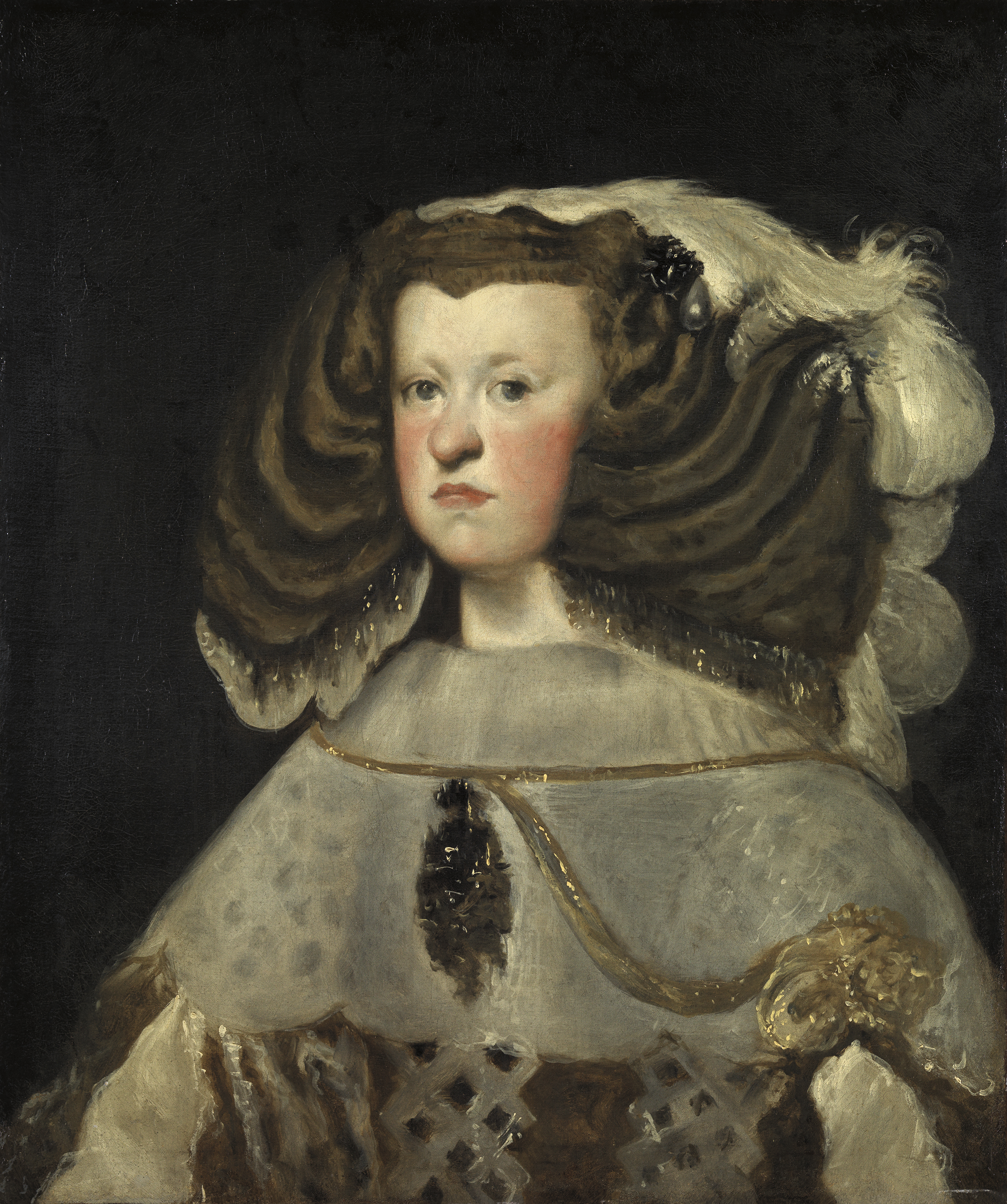
Portrait of Mariana of Austria – Diego Velázquez 1655-57

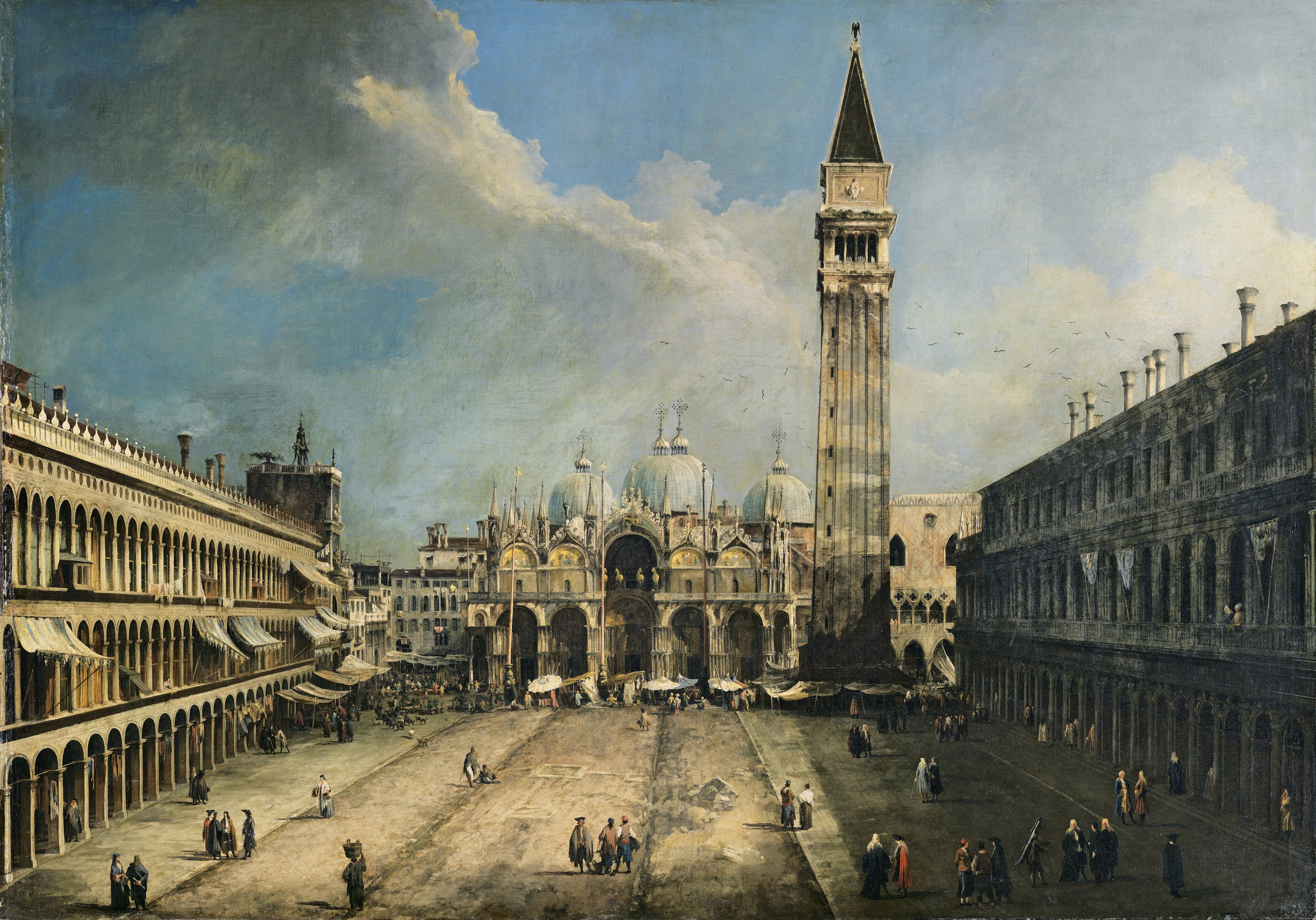
The Piazza San Marco in Venice – Canaletto 1723-24

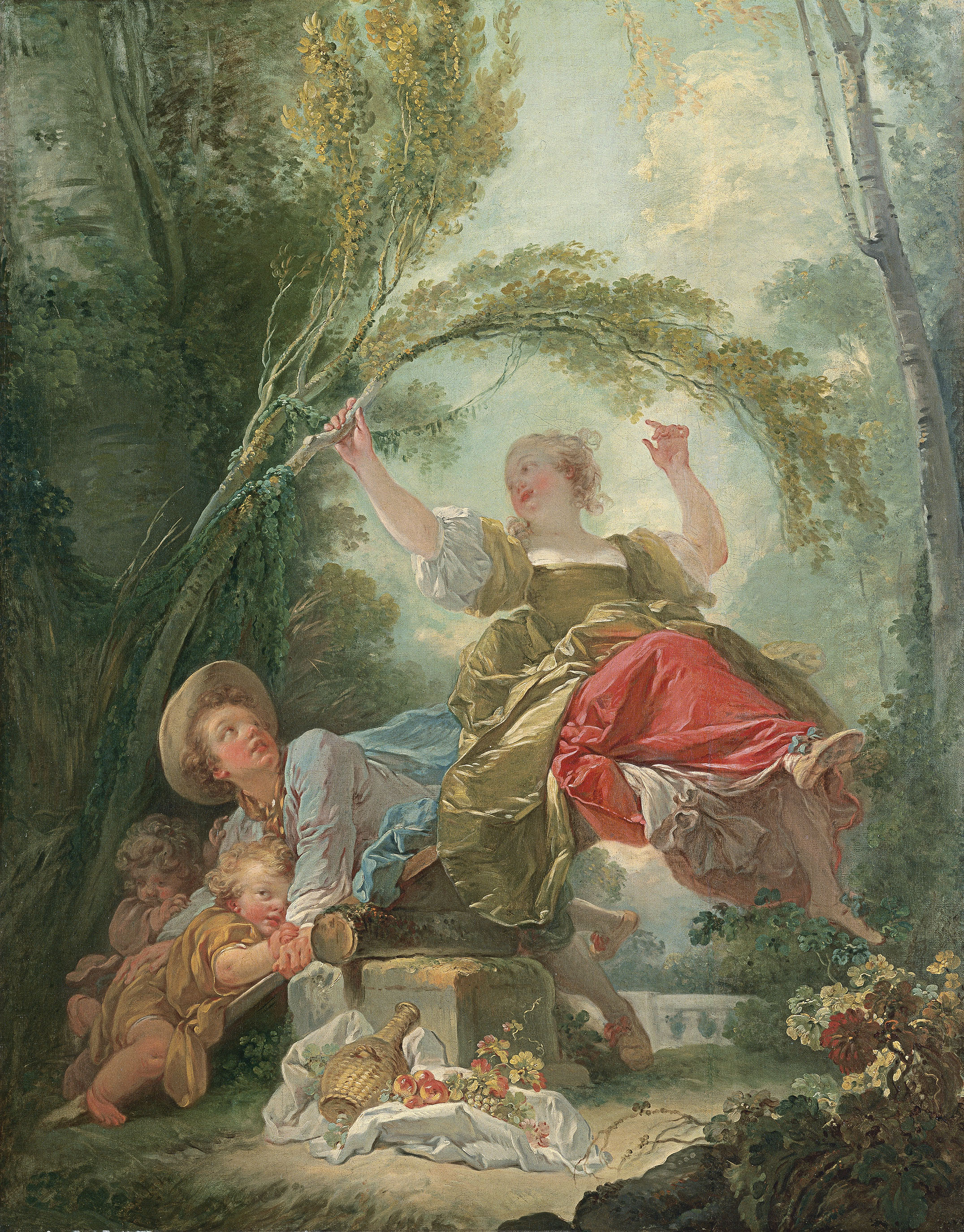
The See-Saw – Jean-Honoré Fragonard 1750-52

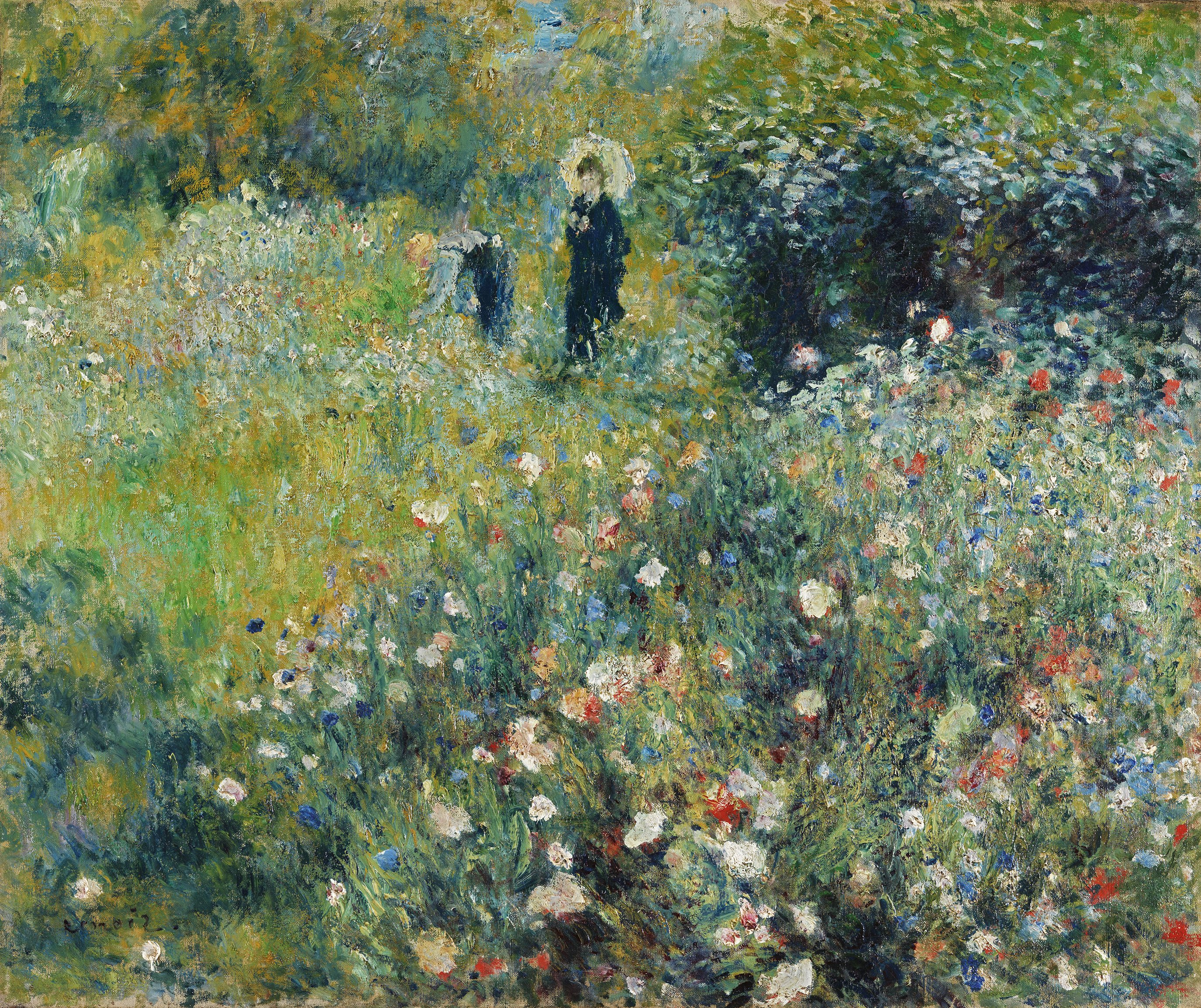
Woman with a Parasol in a Garden – Renoir 1875

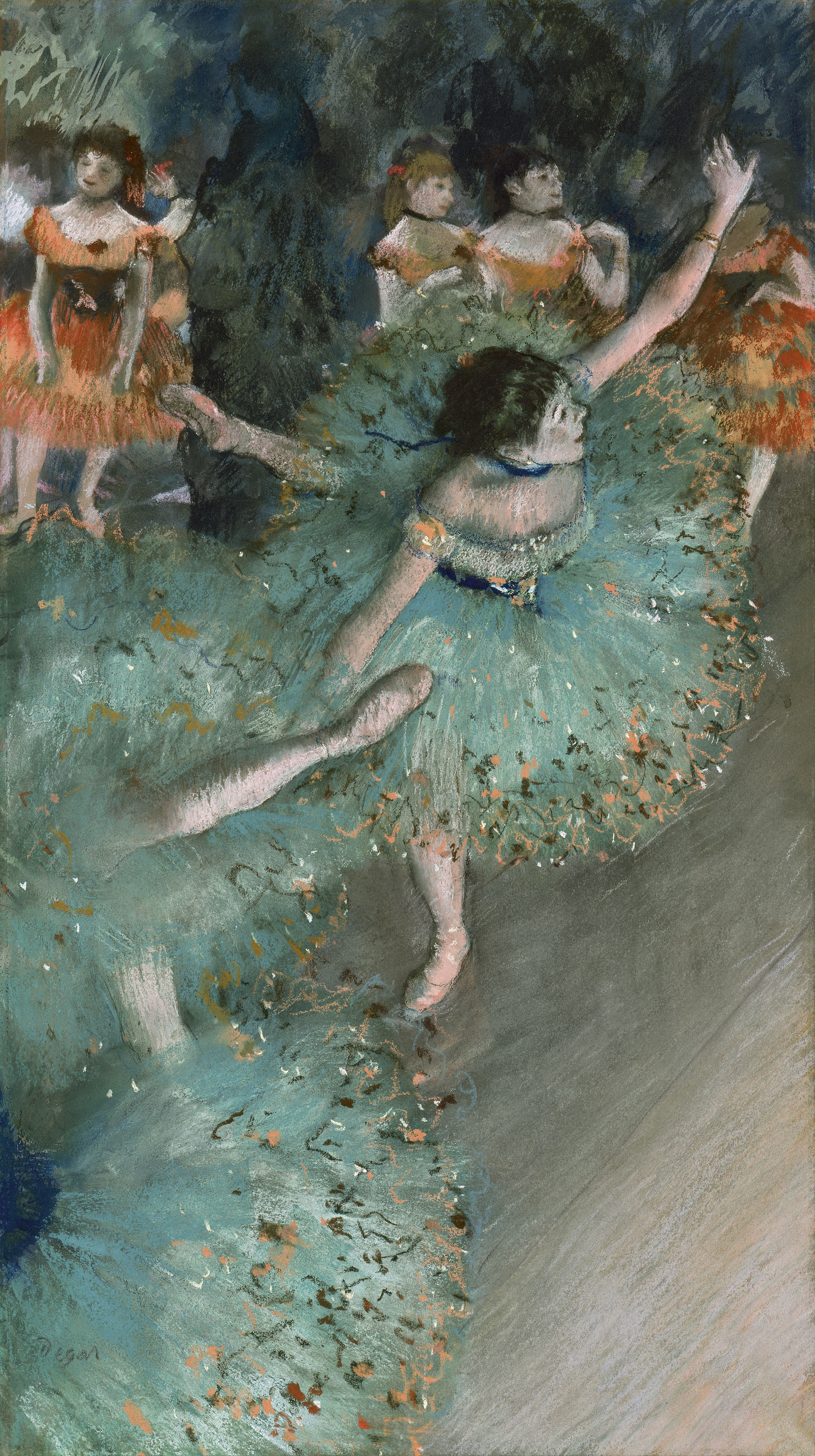
Swaying Dancer – Degas 1877

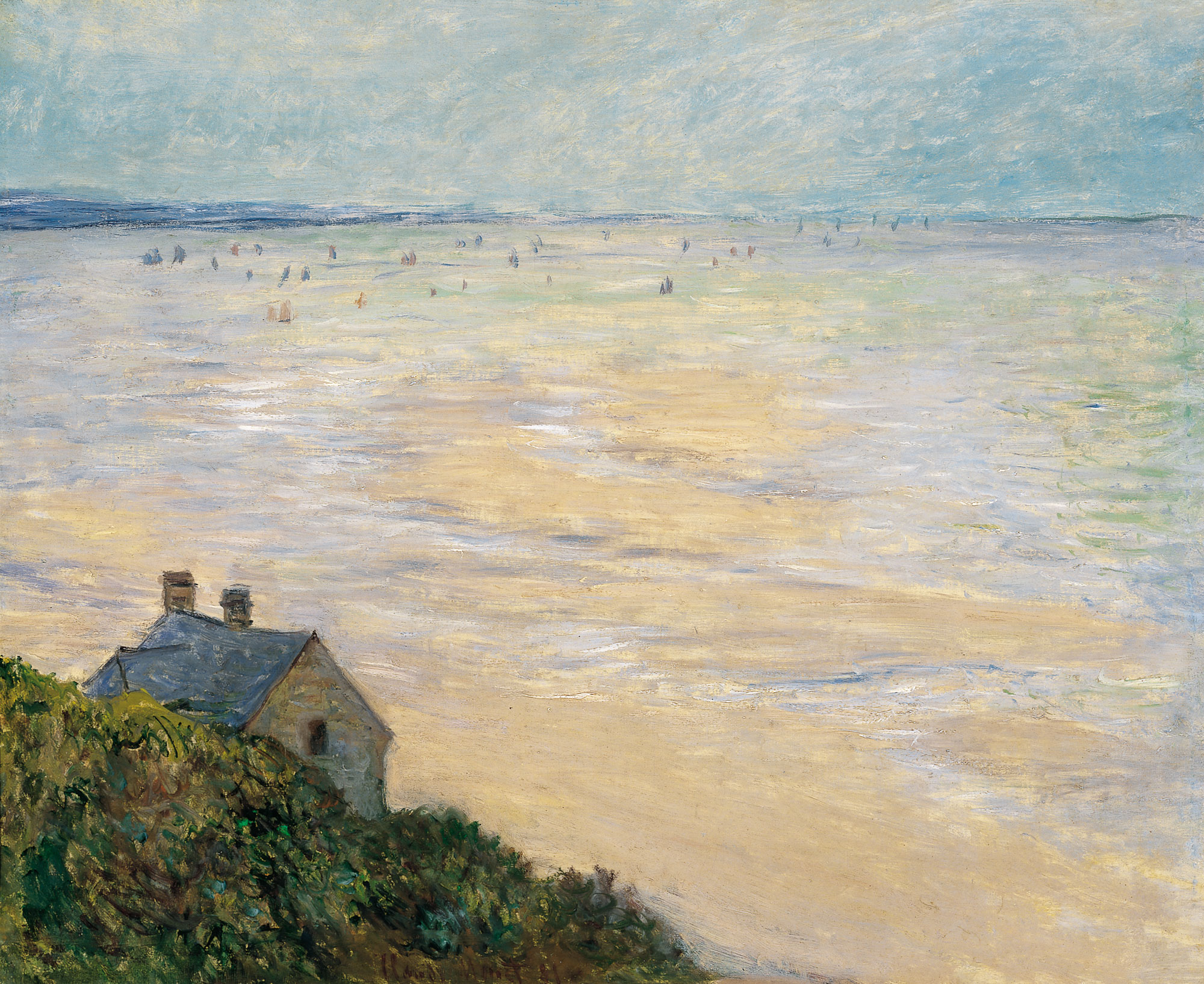
The Hut in Trouville, Low Tide - Claude Monet 1881

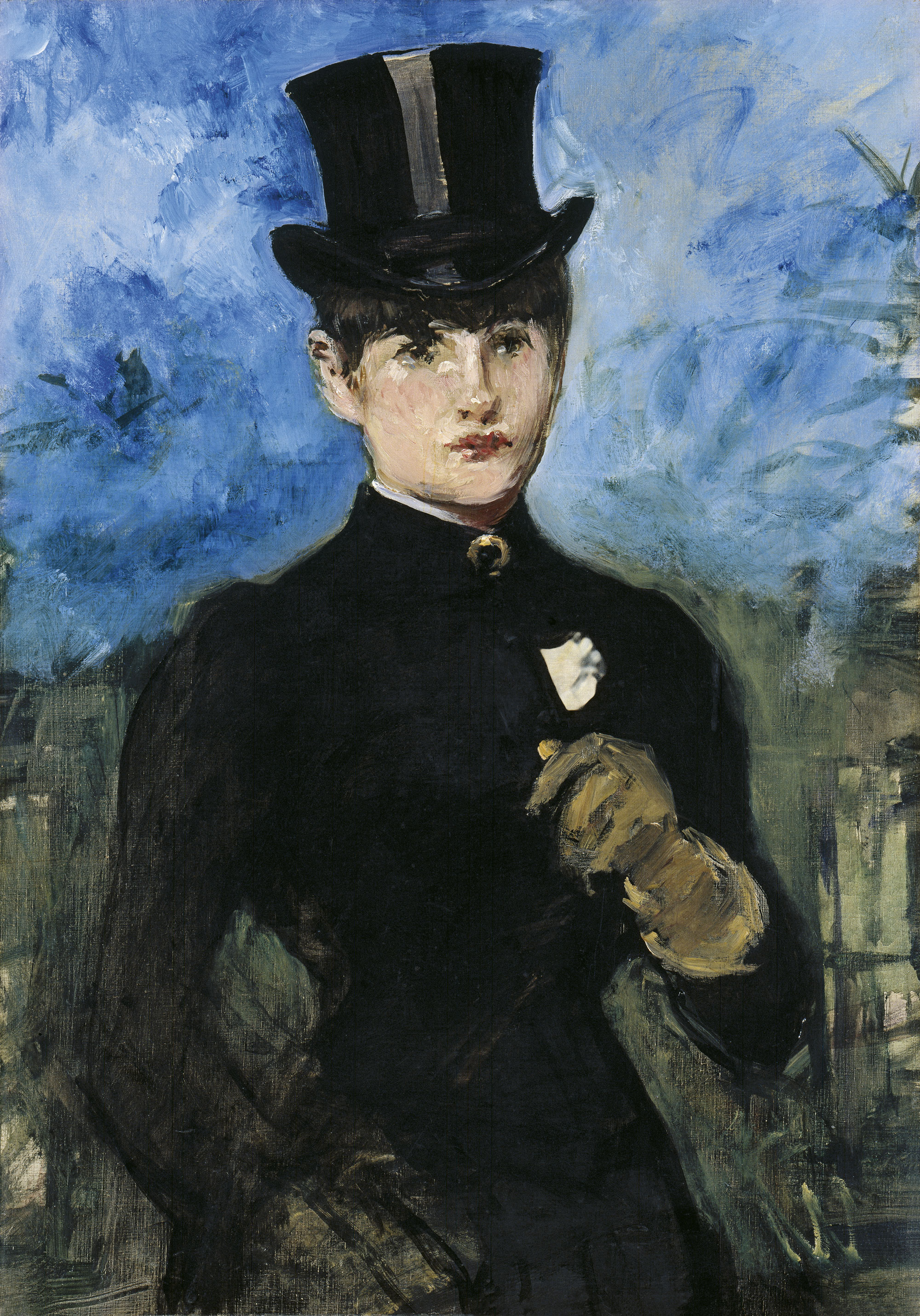
The Amazon – Manet c.1882

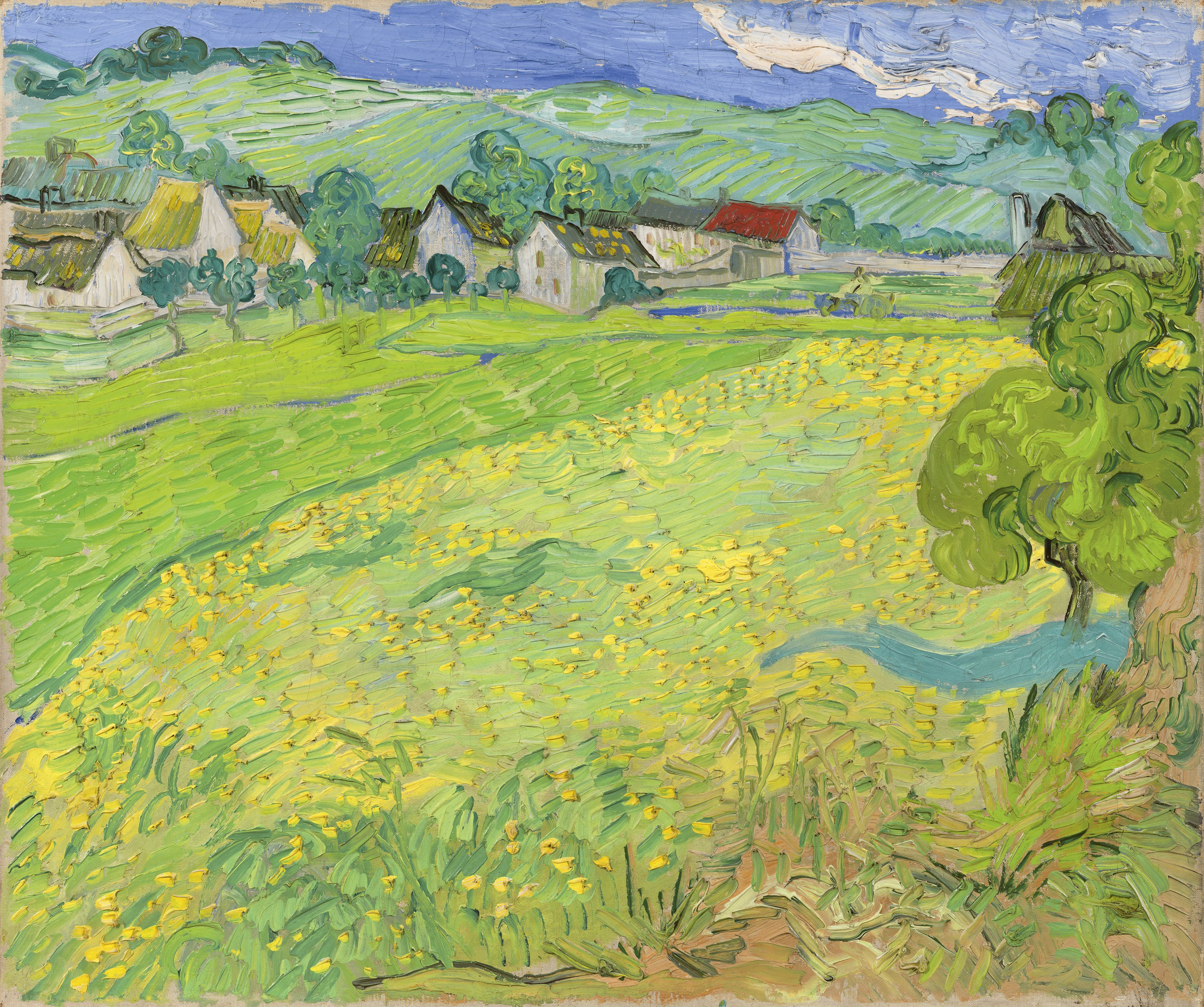
Les Vessenots à Auvers – Vincent van Gogh 1890

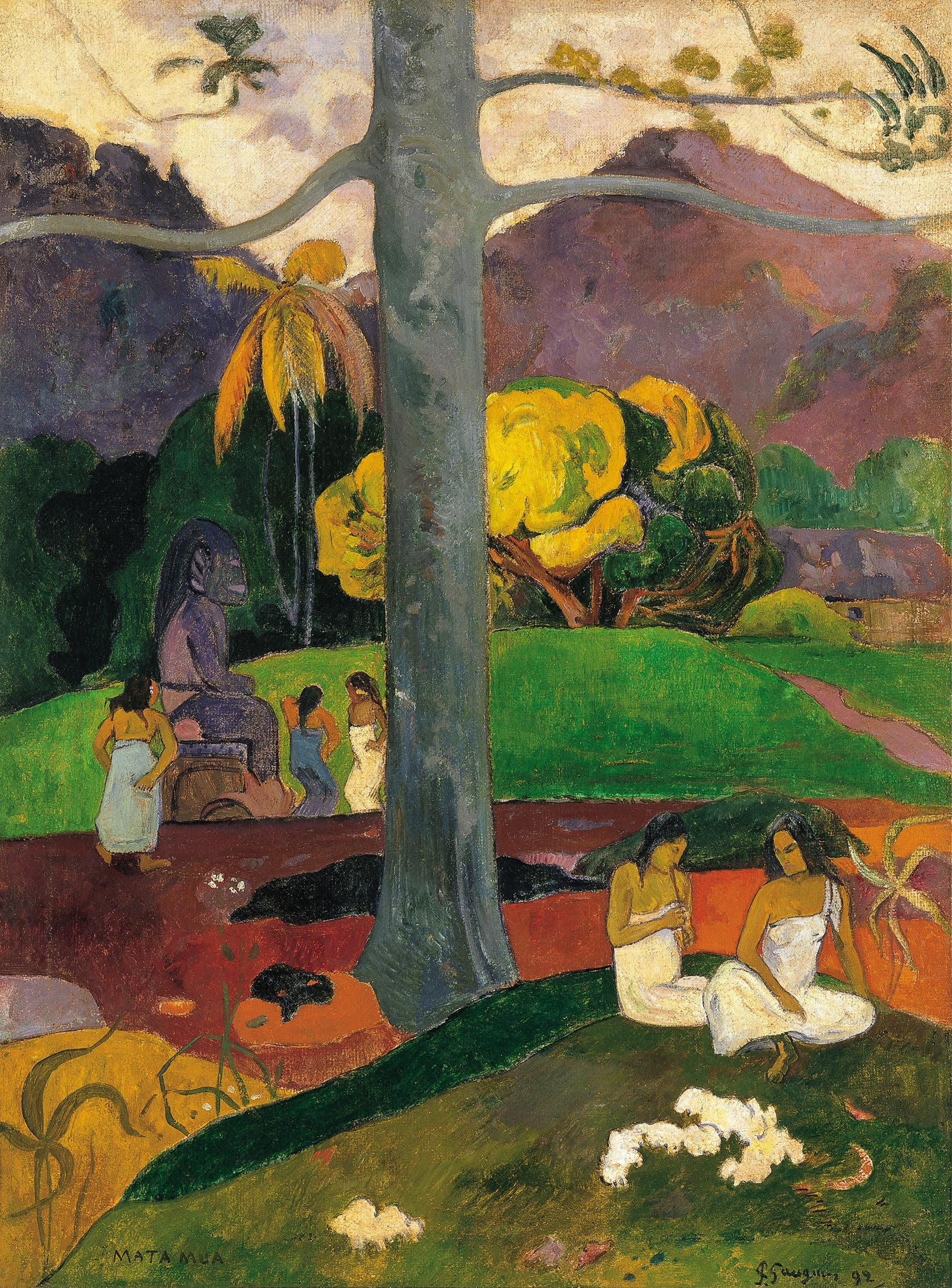
Mata Mua – Paul Gauguin 1892

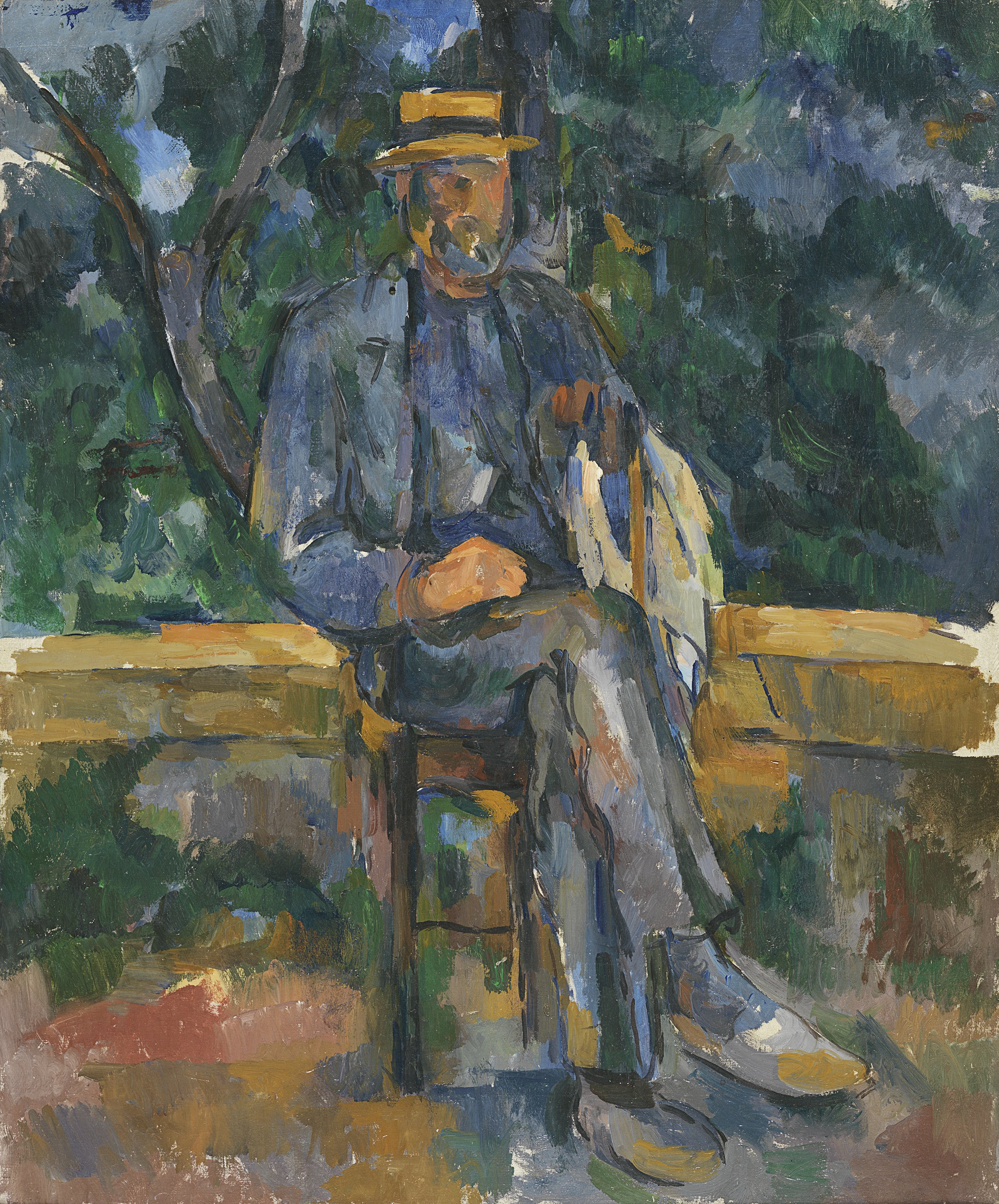
Seated Man – Paul Cézanne 1905-06

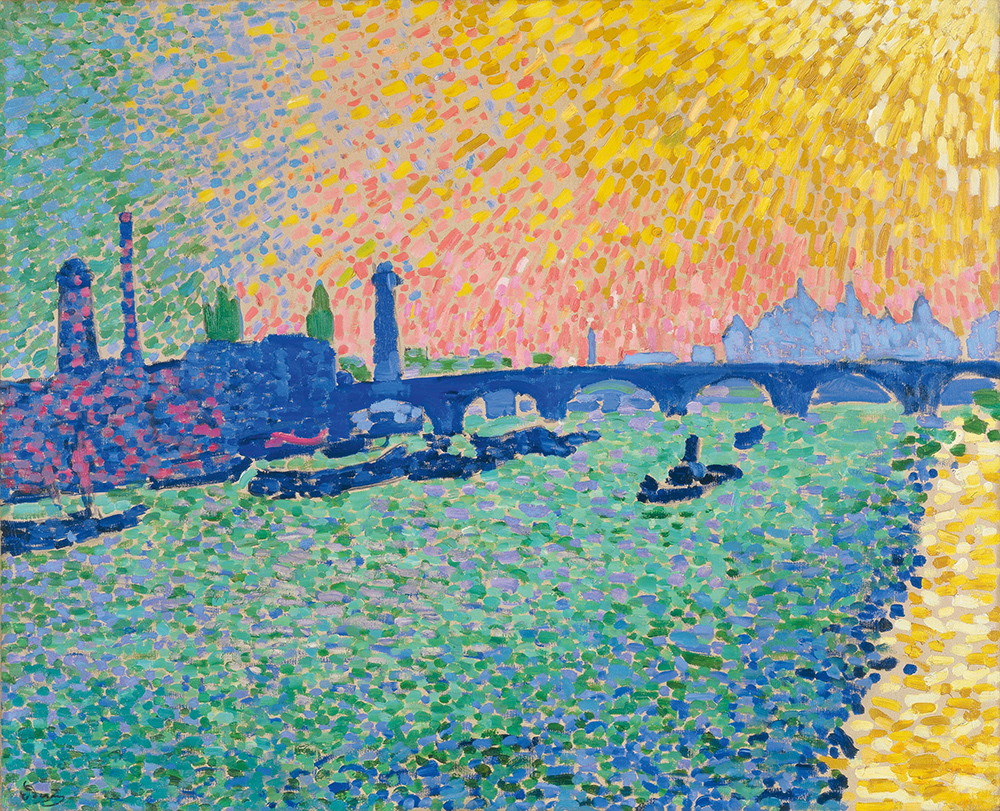
Waterloo Bridge – André Derain 1906

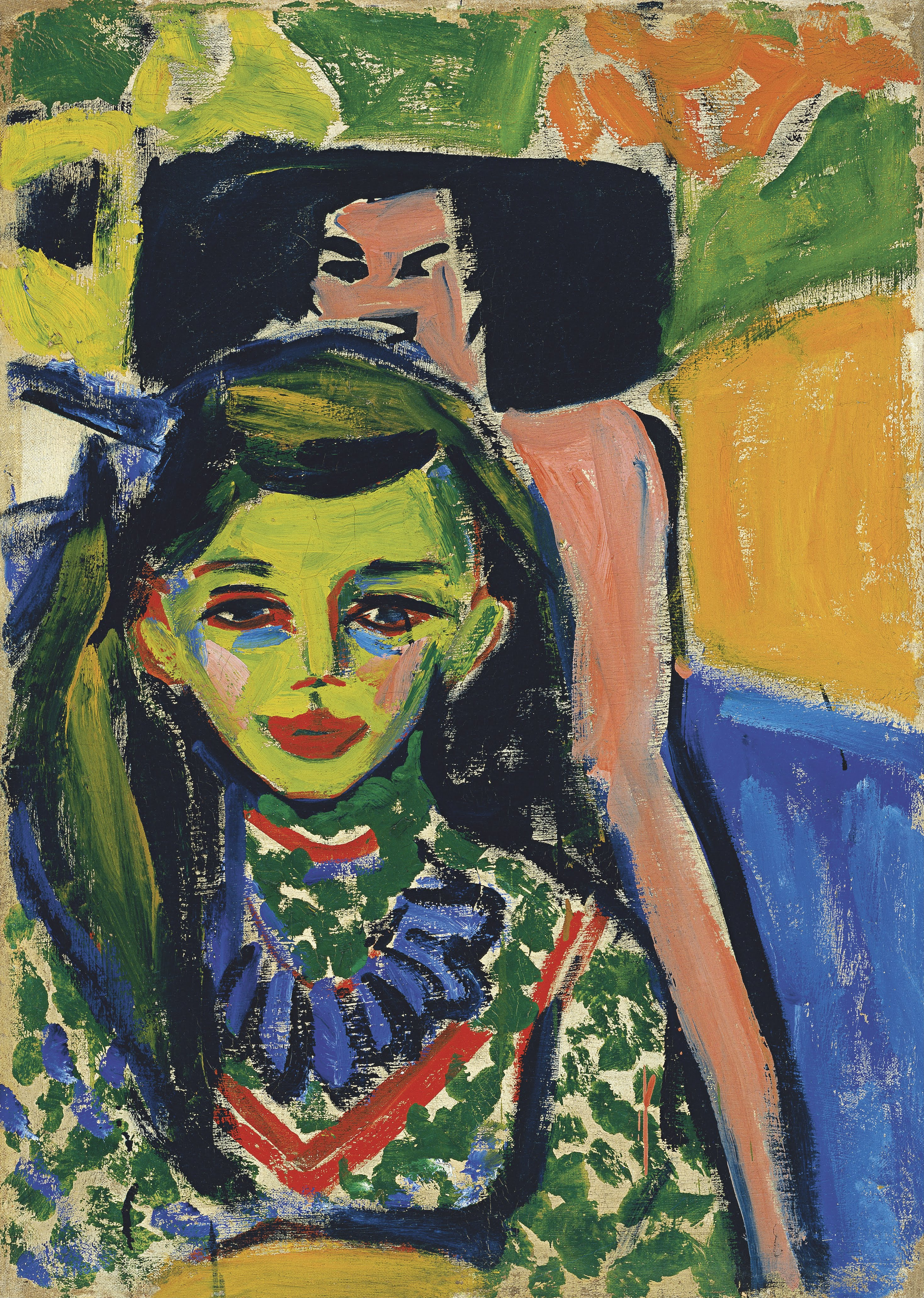
Fränzi before a carved chair – Ernst Ludwig Kirchner 1910

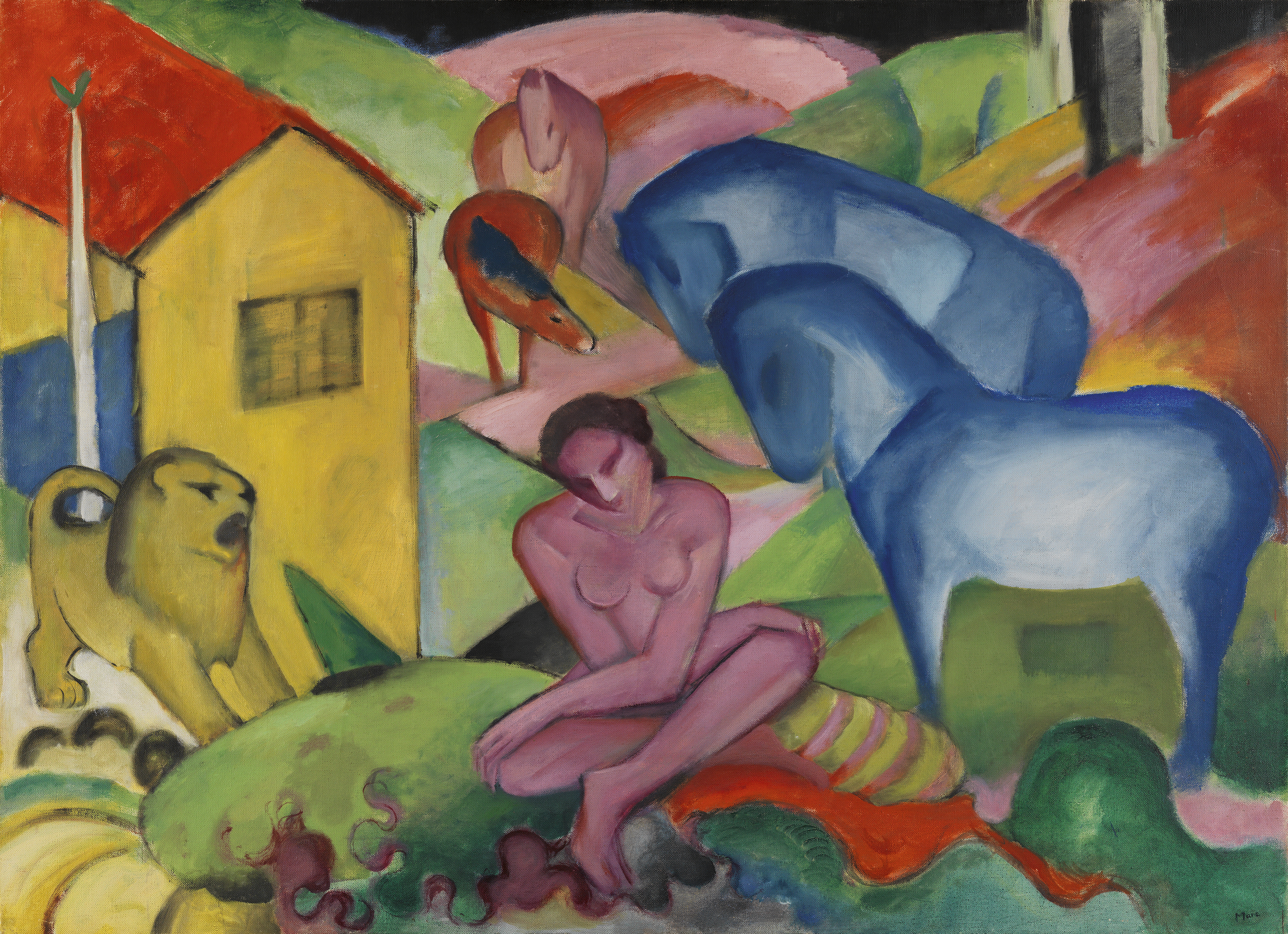
The dream – Franz Marc 1912

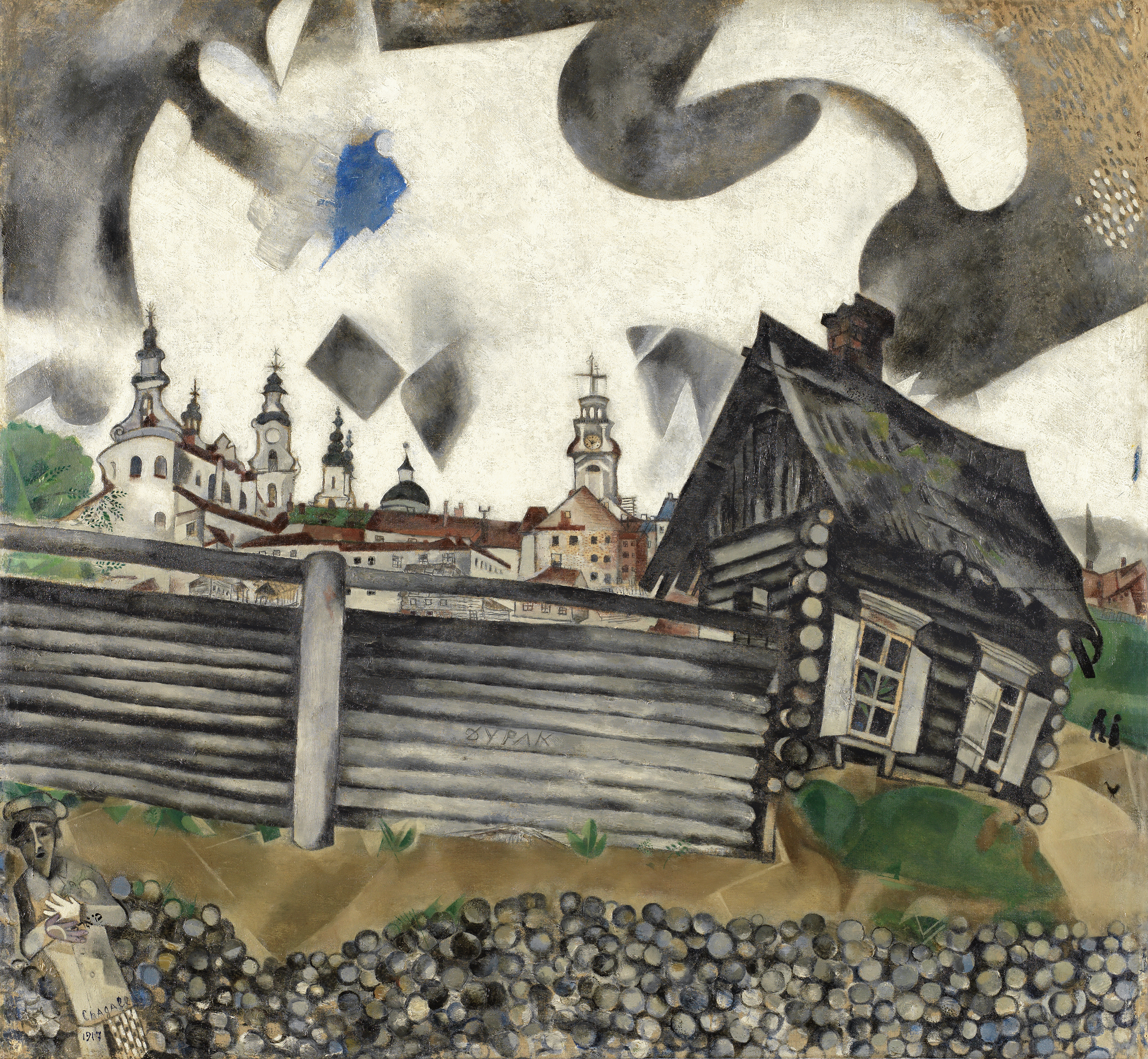
The Grey House- Marc Chagall 1917

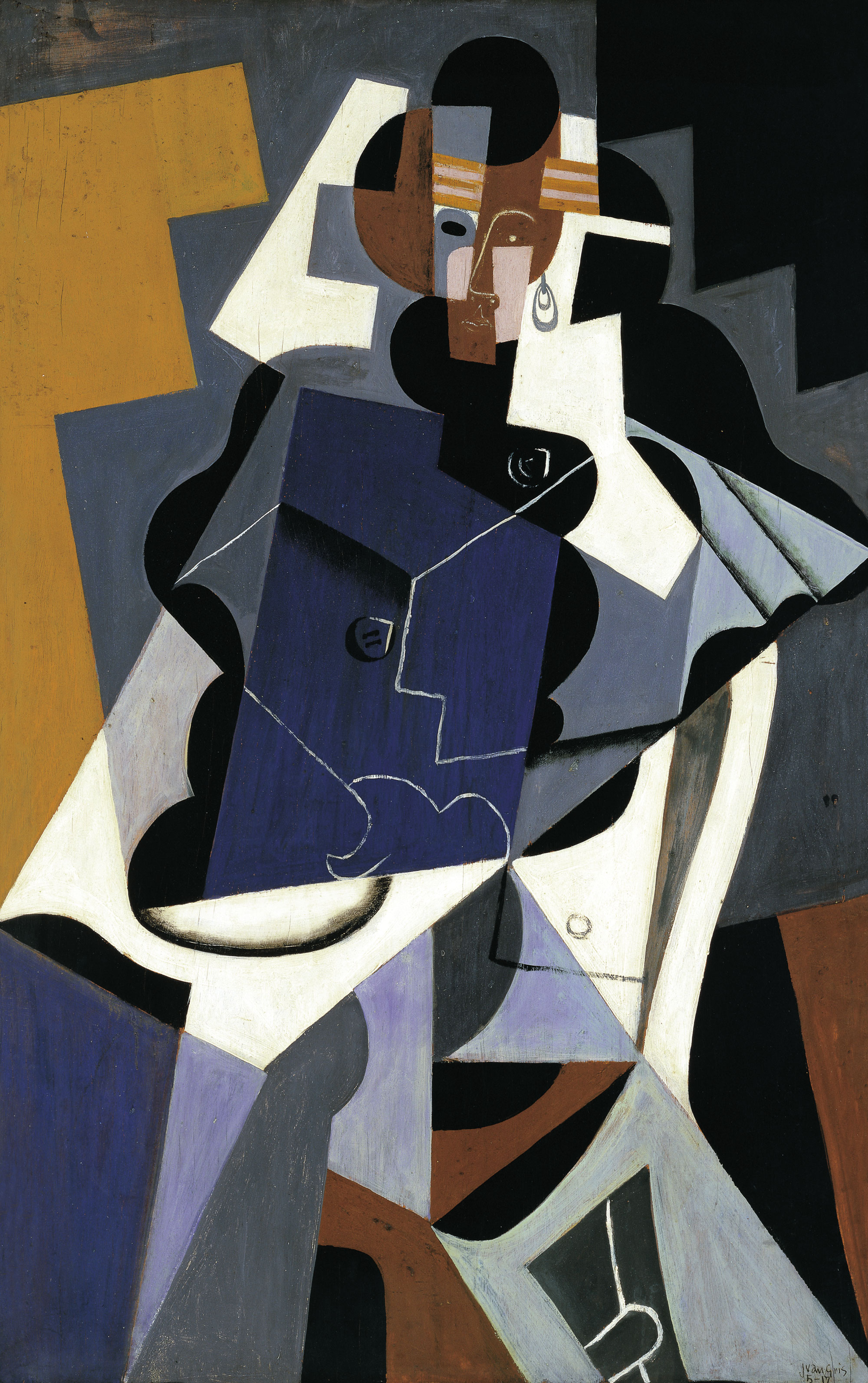
Seated Woman - Juan Gris 1917

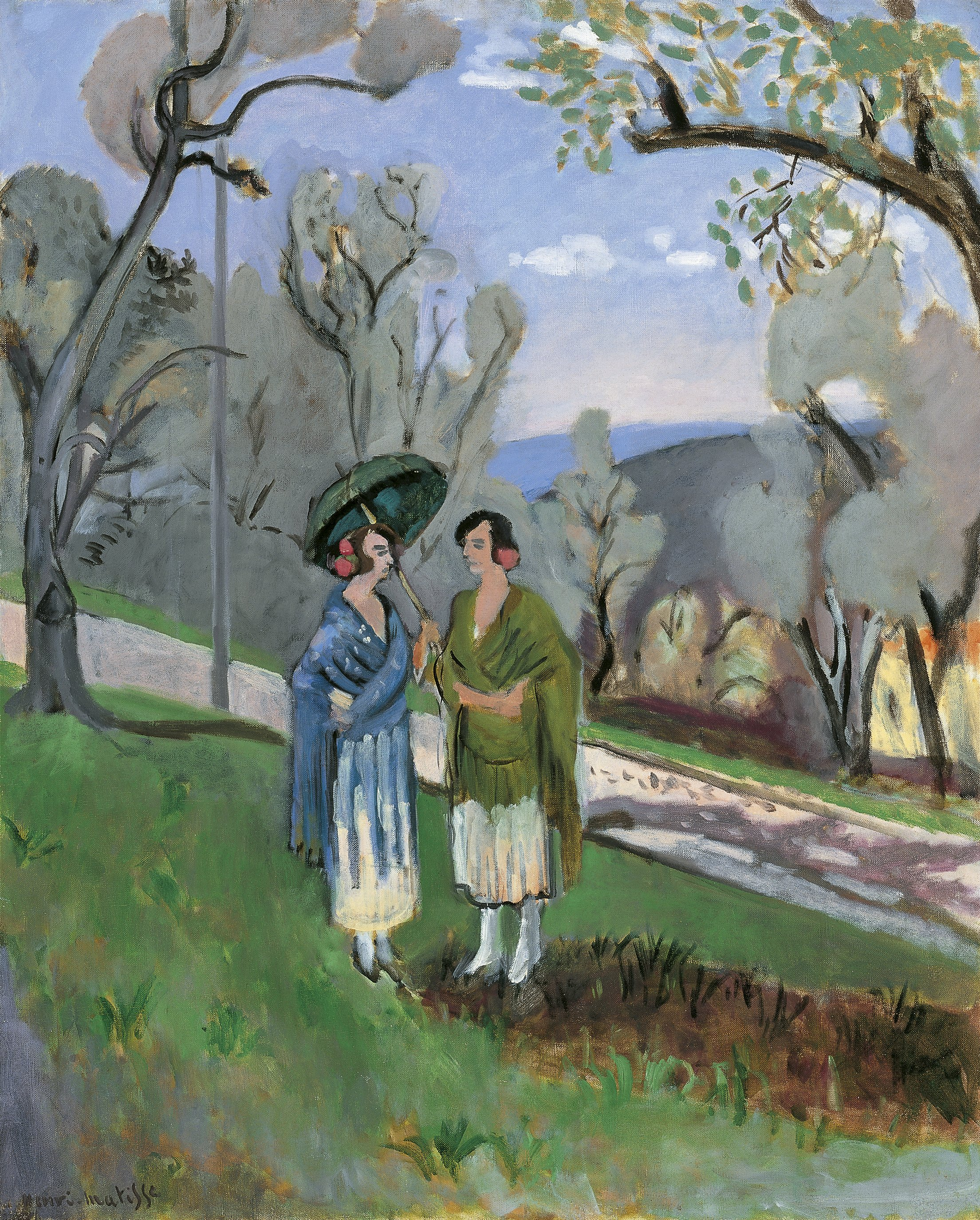
Conversation under the Olive Trees – Henri Matisse 1921

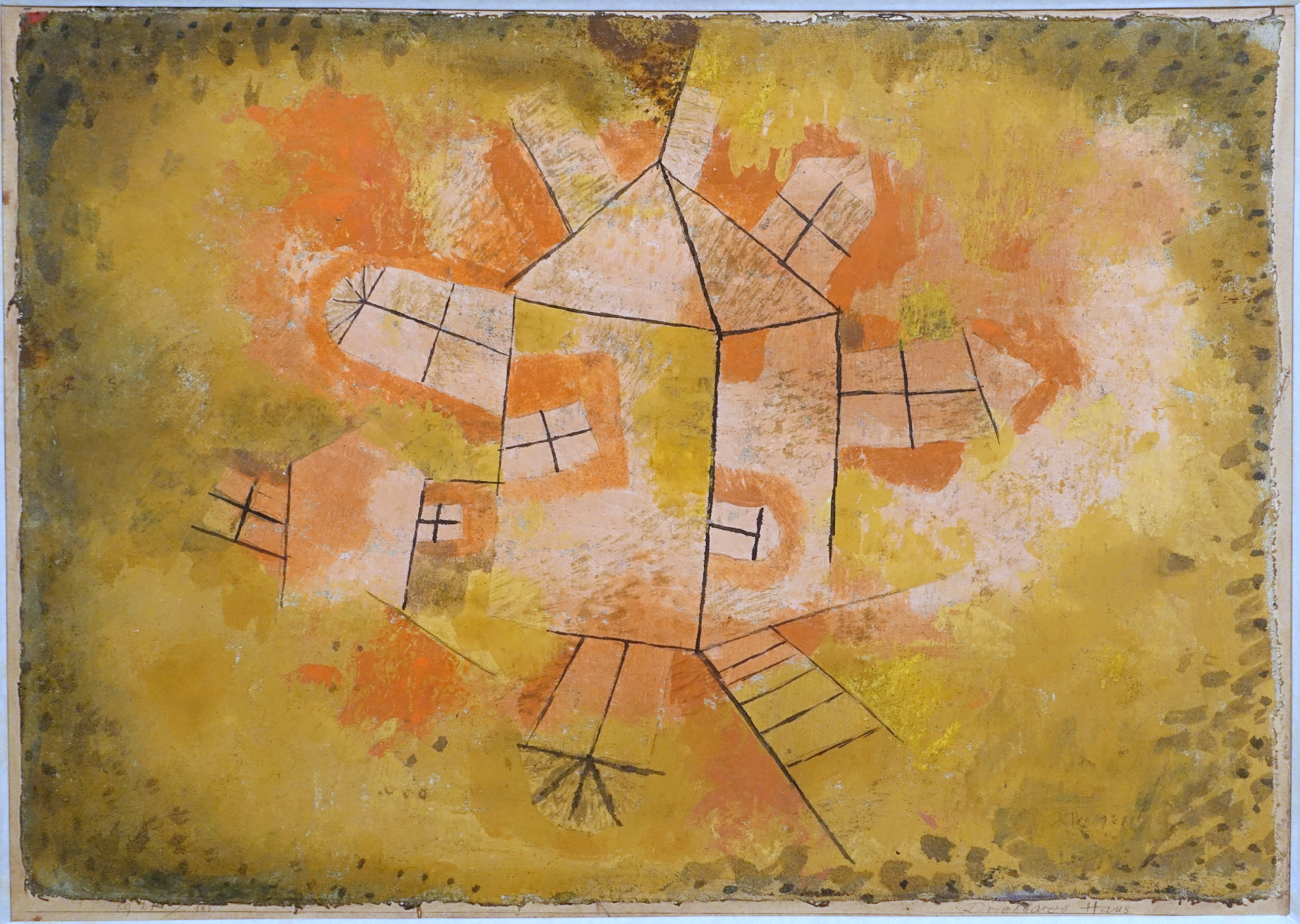
Revolving House – Paul Klee 1921

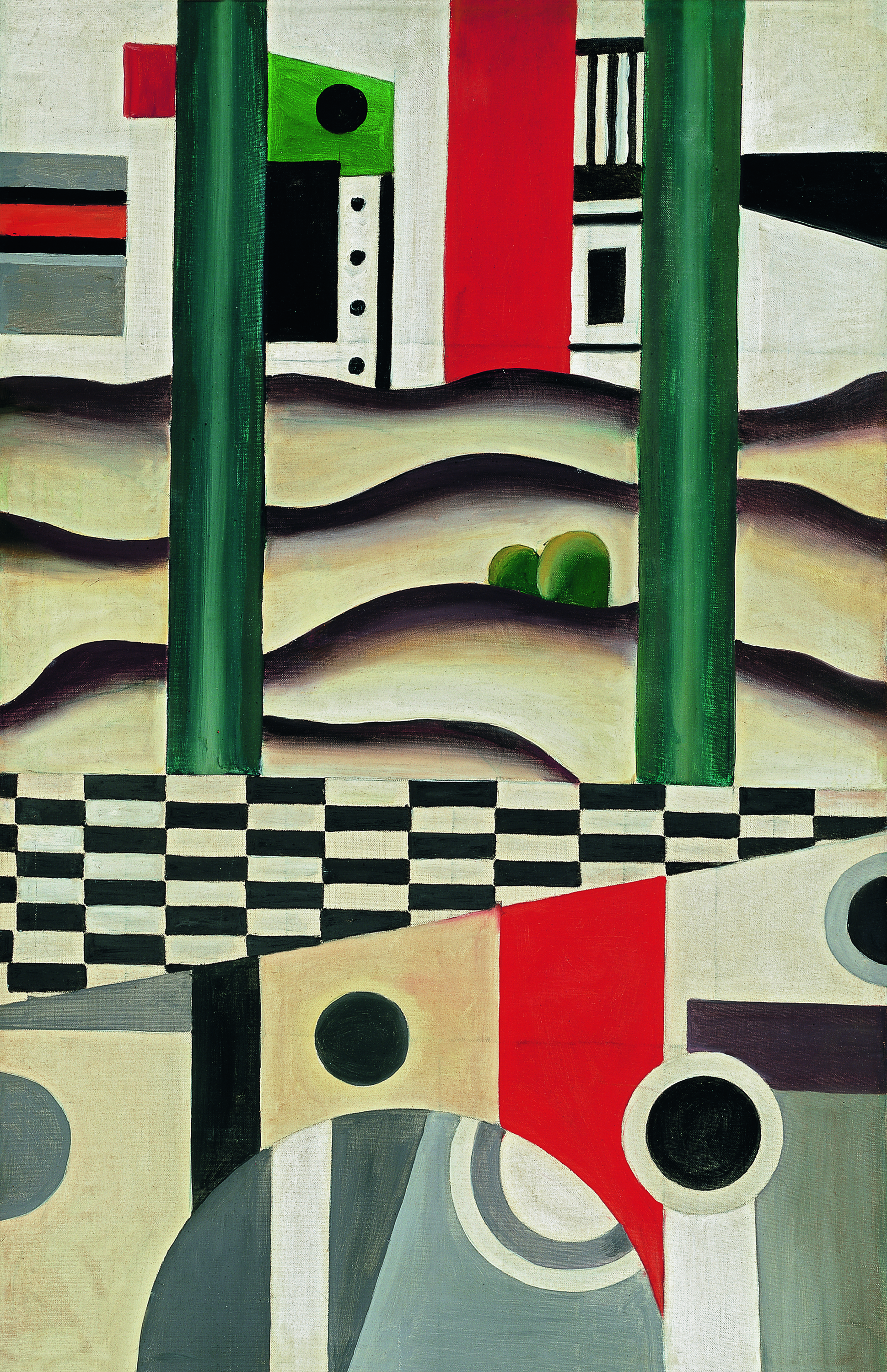
The Bridge - Fernand Léger 1923

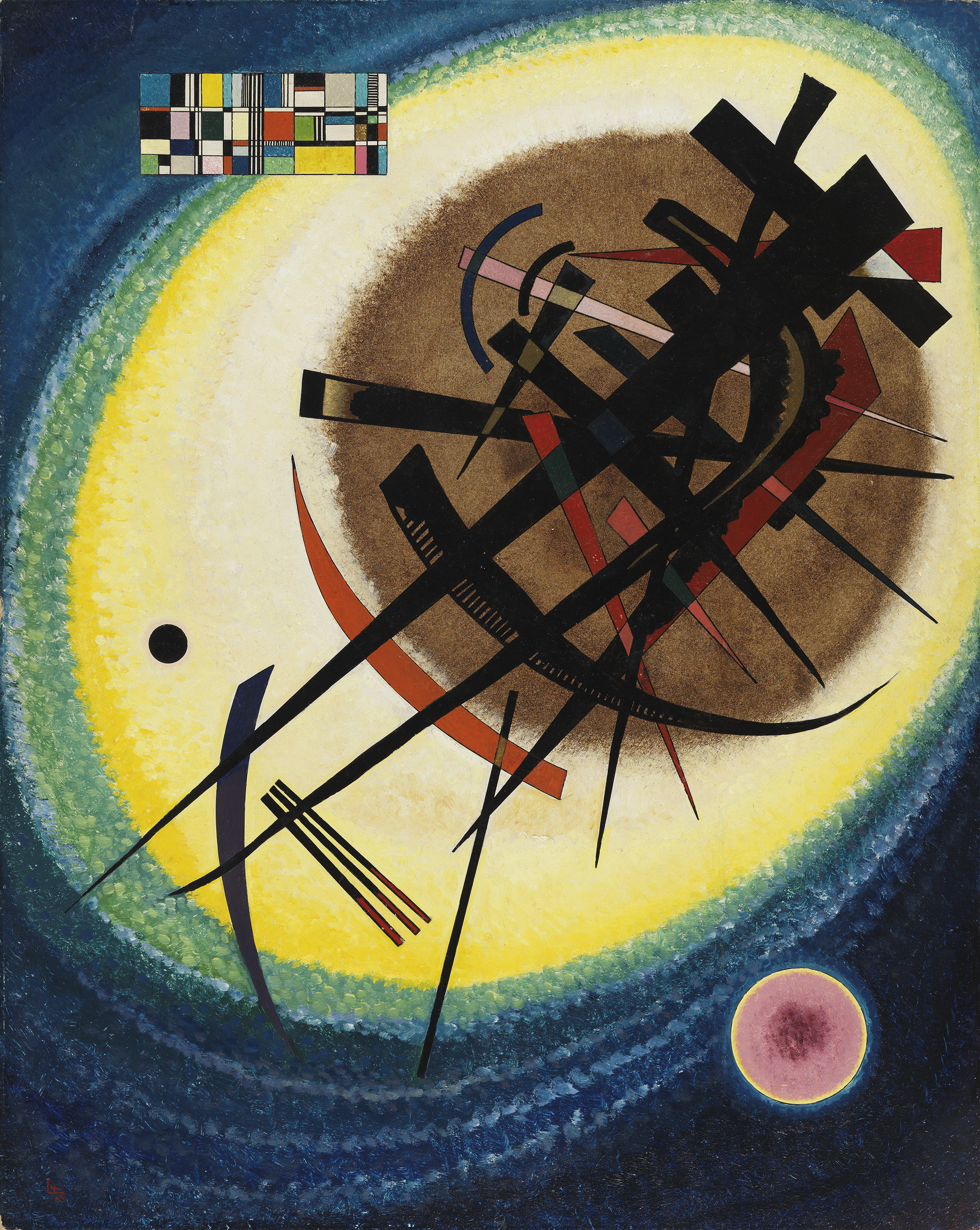
In the Bright Oval – Wassily Kandinsky 1925

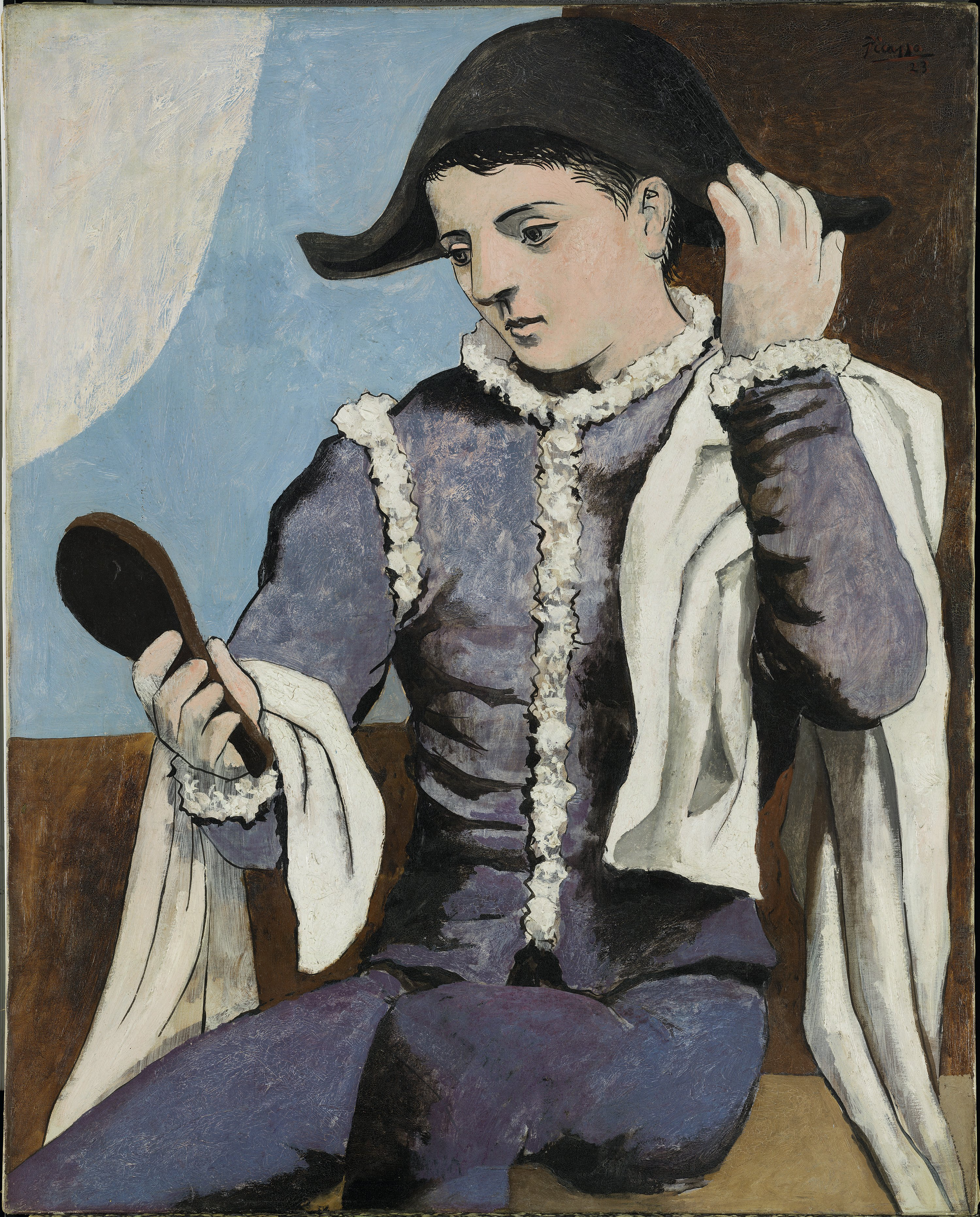
Harlequin with a Mirror – Pablo Picasso 1923

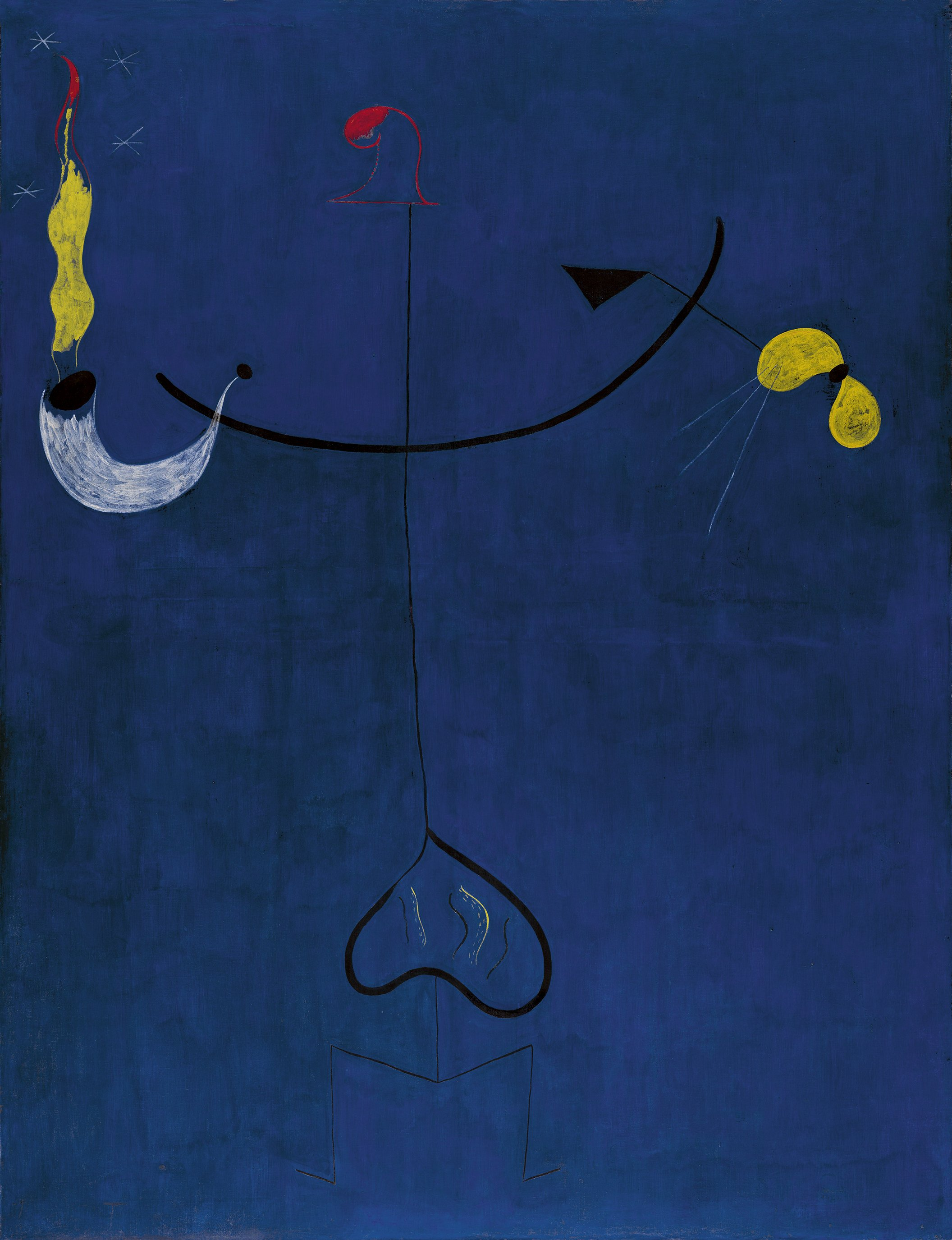
Catalan Peasant with a Guitar - Joan Miró 1924

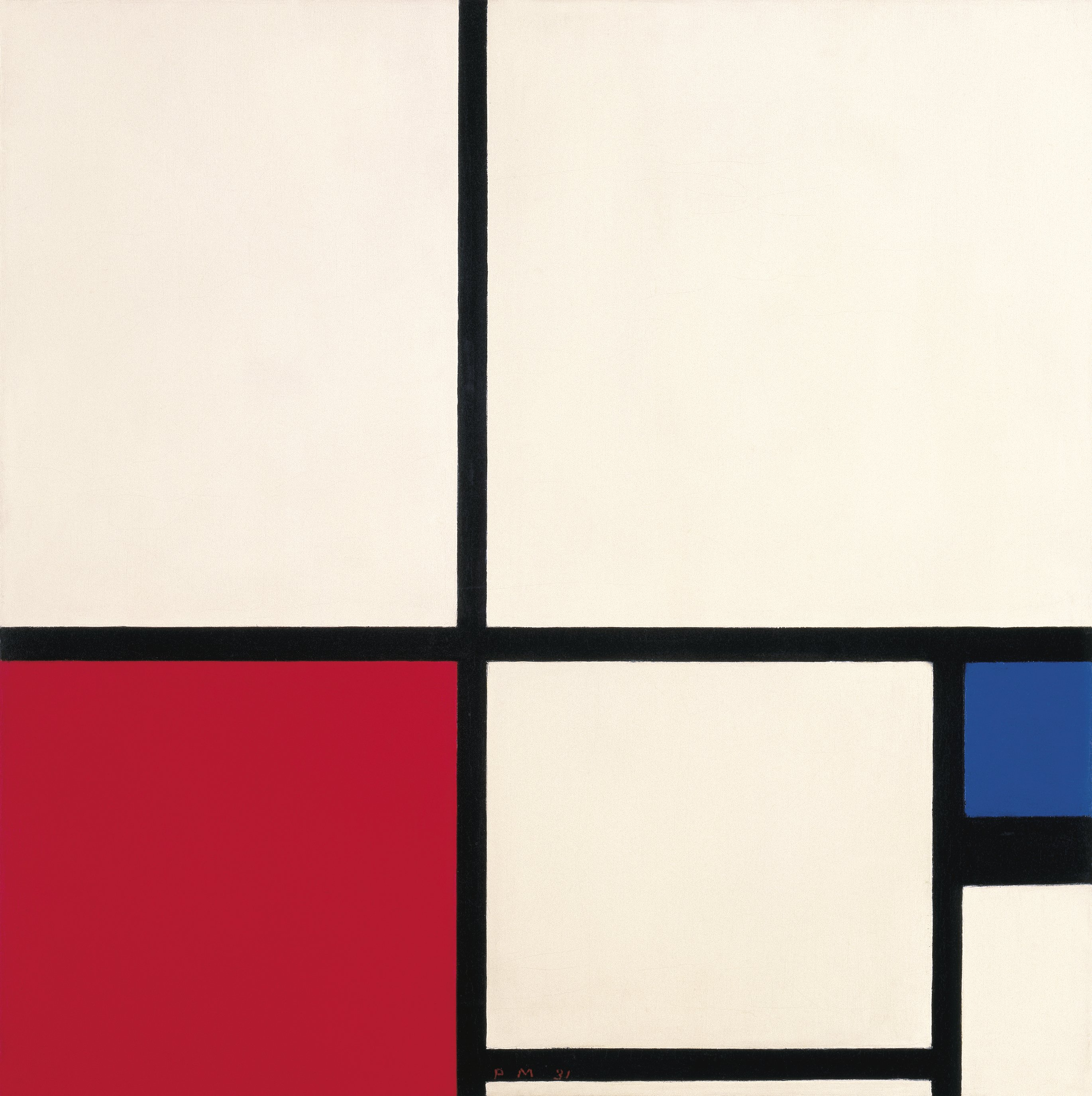
Composition No. I – Piet Mondrian 1931

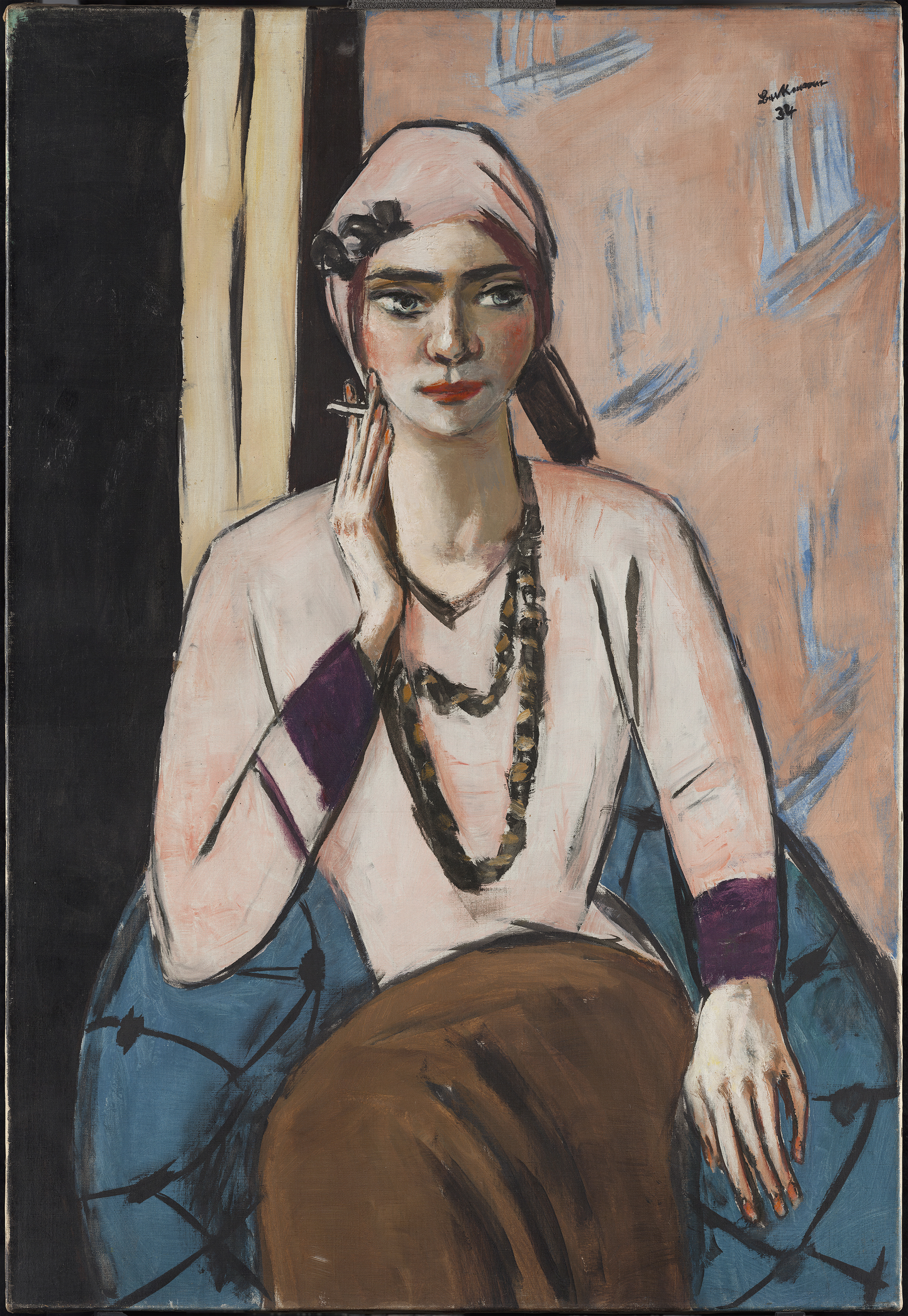
Quappi in Pink Jumper – Max Beckmann 1932-34

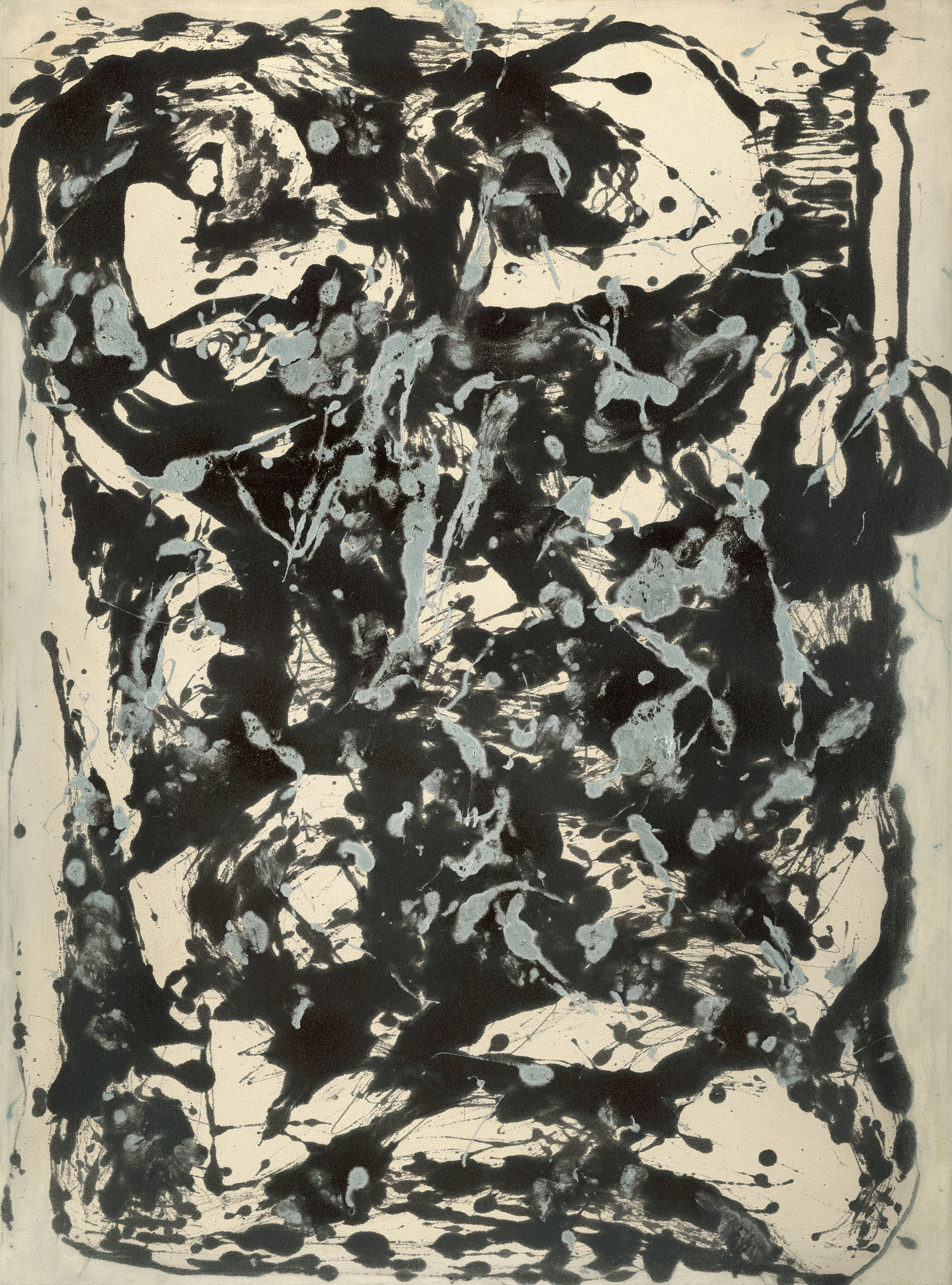
Brown and Silver I - Jackson Pollock 1951

== Sales ==
In 2011, due to "a lack of liquid funds", Cervera decided to sell The Lock by the English artist John Constable. The painting, which belonged to her private collection, was sold in London the following year for €25.8 million, more than doubling the price paid for it in 1990.

== See also ==
- Carmen Thyssen Museum
- Thyssen family
