= 1950 in art =

Events from the year 1950 in art.

== Events ==
- Austrian painter Arnulf Rainer founds the Hundsgruppe ("dog pack") with Arik Brauer, Ernst Fuchs and Josef Mikl.
- Paint by number kits introduced by Max S. Klein, an engineer and owner of the Palmer Paint Company of Detroit, and Dan Robbins.
- Ernst Gombrich's The Story of Art is published by Phaidon Press.

== Awards ==
- Archibald Prize: William Dargie – Sir Leslie McConnan
- Audubon Artists Gold Medal – Richmond Barthé

== Works ==
- Jean Arp – Evocation of a Form: Human, Lunar, Spectral (model for bronze)
- Francis Bacon – Fragment of a Crucifixion
- Max Beckmann – Falling Man
- Marc Chagall – La Mariée
- Salvador Dalí – The Madonna of Port Lligat (second version, Fukuoka Art Museum)
- Max Desfor – Flight of Refugees Across Wrecked Bridge in Korea (photograph)
- Robert Doisneau – Le baiser de l'hôtel de ville (The Kiss) (photograph)
- Alberto Giacometti – The Chariot
- E. Chambré Hardman – The Birth of the Ark Royal (photograph)
- Maruki Iri and Maruki Toshi – Ghosts, Fire and Water (Yūrei, Hi and Mizu), first of The Hiroshima Panels (原爆の図, Genbaku no zu)
- Oskar Kokoschka – The Myth of Prometheus (triptych)
- L. S. Lowry – The Pond
- Henri Matisse – Beasts of the Sea (paper collage)
- Joan Mitchell - Figure and the City'
- Jackson Pollock – Autumn Rhythm (Number 30)
- William Scott – Bowl, Eggs and Lemons
- Vladimir Tretchikoff – Chinese Girl, popularly known as "The Green Lady"
- Keith Vaughan – Theseus and the Minotaur (Tate Britain)

== Births ==
- April 22 – Thierry Zéno, Belgian filmmaker (d. 2017)
- June 24 – Bob Carlos Clarke, Irish photographer (d. 2006)
- July 28 – Neville Garrick, Jamaican graphic artist and photographer (d. 2023)
- July 29 – Jenny Holzer, American neo-conceptual artist
- August 30
  - Konrad Bernheimer, Venezuelan-born German art dealer and collector
  - Antony Gormley, English sculptor
- September 4 – Kobe (Jacques Saelens), Belgian visual artist and sculptor
- November 10 – Jonathan Janson, American painter and art historian
- December 11 – Aleksandr Tatarskiy, Russian animator, artist and film director (d. 2007)

(Specific date unknown)

- David Ruben Piqtoukun, Canadian Inuit sculptor
- Andrew Unangst. American photographer

== Deaths ==
- February 12 – Boris Vladimirski, Soviet painter of the Socialist Realism school (b. 1878)
- February 15 – Albert Herter, American painter (b. 1871)
- April 5 – Hiroshi Yoshida, Japanese painter and woodblock printmaker (b. 1876)
- September 26 – Pierre Roy, French-born painter, illustrator and designer (b. 1880)
- December 7 – Wojciech Weiss, Polish painter and draughtsman (b. 1875)
- December 28 – Max Beckmann, German painter (b. 1884)
- James Sleator, Irish painter (b. 1889)

== See also ==
- 1950 in fine arts of the Soviet Union
