= Night (disambiguation) =

Night is the period in which the sun is below the horizon.

Night or Nights may also refer to:

== People ==
- Candice Night (born 1971), American vocalist/lyricist
- Lydia Night (born 2000), American musician
- Rebecca Night (born 1985), British actress
- M. Night Shyamalan (born 1970), Indian-born American film director

== Art ==
- The Night (Beckmann), a 20th-century painting by German artist Max Beckmann
- Night (Michelangelo), a 1526–1531 sculpture by Michelangelo

== Film ==
- Night (1930 film), animated short
- La Notte, a 1961 Italian film
- Night, a 2004 Australian film
- Night (2007 film), an Australian documentary

== Television ==
- "Night" (The Acolyte), an episode of The Acolyte
- "Night" (The Handmaid's Tale season 1 episode)
- "Night" (The Handmaid's Tale season 3 episode)
- "Night" (Star Trek: Voyager), a 1998 episode of Star Trek: Voyager

== Video games ==
- Nights into Dreams, the first game in the series, for the Sega Saturn
- Nights: Journey of Dreams, the second game in the series, for the Wii console

== Literature ==
- Al-Lail ("Night" or "The Night"), the ninety-second sura of the Qur'an
- Night (memoir), a 1956 (Yiddish), 1960 (English) book by Elie Wiesel
- Night (O'Brien novel), a 1972 novel by Edna O'Brien
- Night (sketch), a 1969 short play by Harold Pinter
- "Night" (Blake poem), a poem by Robert Blake poem from the 1789 collection Songs of Innocence
- "Night" (Ralph poem)

== Music ==
=== Performers ===
- Night (rock band), a band from the late 1970s and early 1980s
- Night (Nepali band)

=== Albums ===
- Night (John Abercrombie album), 1984
- Night (Kino album), 1986
- Night (Misako Odani album), 2003
- Night, by Gazpacho, 2007
- Night (Holly Cole album), 2012
- Night (George Winston album), 2022

=== Songs ===
- "Night" (Mussorgsky song), an 1864 song by composer Mussorgsky
- "Night" (Rubinstein song), a 1940s song by composer Anton Rubinstein
- "Night" (Jackie Wilson song), 1960
- "Night" (Bruce Springsteen song), from the 1975 album Born to Run
- "Night" (Janet Jackson song), 2015
- "Night" (Stray Kids song), from the 2024 album Giant
- "Nights" (Lindisfarne song), 1982
- "Nights" (Ed Bruce song), 1986
- "Nights" (Frank Ocean song), from the 2016 album Blonde
- "Night", a 1950s song by Edwin McArthur
- "Night", by American band Bright from the 2005 studio album Bells Break Their Towers

== Other uses ==
- Night, Alberta, Canada
- Night (hieroglyph)
- Night (company), an American digital talent management

== See also ==
- "A Night", 2015 song by Rihanna, later released on the 2016 album Anti and retitled as "Goodnight Gotham"
- List of night deities, some of whom are known by names also meaning "night"
- The Night (disambiguation)
- Night and Day (disambiguation)
- Darkest Night (disambiguation)
- Longest Night (disambiguation)
- Night After Night (disambiguation)
- Nite (disambiguation)
