= The Night =

The Night may refer to:

== Film ==
- The Night (1992 film) (Al-Lail), a 1992 film by Syrian filmmaker Mohammad Malas
- La Notte (The Night), a 1961 Italian film
- The Night (2020 film), a film by Iranian-American filmmaker Kourosh Ahari

== Music ==
- The Night, an indie dance group formed by members of Nero

=== Albums ===
- The Night (Morphine album), 2000
- The Night (Saint Etienne album), 2024

=== Songs ===
- "The Night" (Frankie Valli and the Four Seasons song)
- "The Night" (The Animals song), 1983
- "The Night" (Disturbed song), 2008
- "The Night" (Goodnight Nurse song), 2008
- "The Night" (Valerie Dore song), 1984
- "The Night" (Scooter Song), 2003
- "The Night", a song by Basshunter from The Old Shit album
- "The Night", a song by Heart from Brigade
- "The Night", a song by Hell on Wheels
- "The Nights", a song by Avicii

== Other uses ==
- Al-Lail (“The Night” or “Night”), the ninety-second sura of the Qur'an
- The Night (painting), by Max Beckmann c. 1919

== See also ==
- Night, the period of time when the sun is below the horizon
- Night (disambiguation)
- Nights (disambiguation)
