= Portrait of Mink with Violet Shawl =

Painting by Max Beckmann

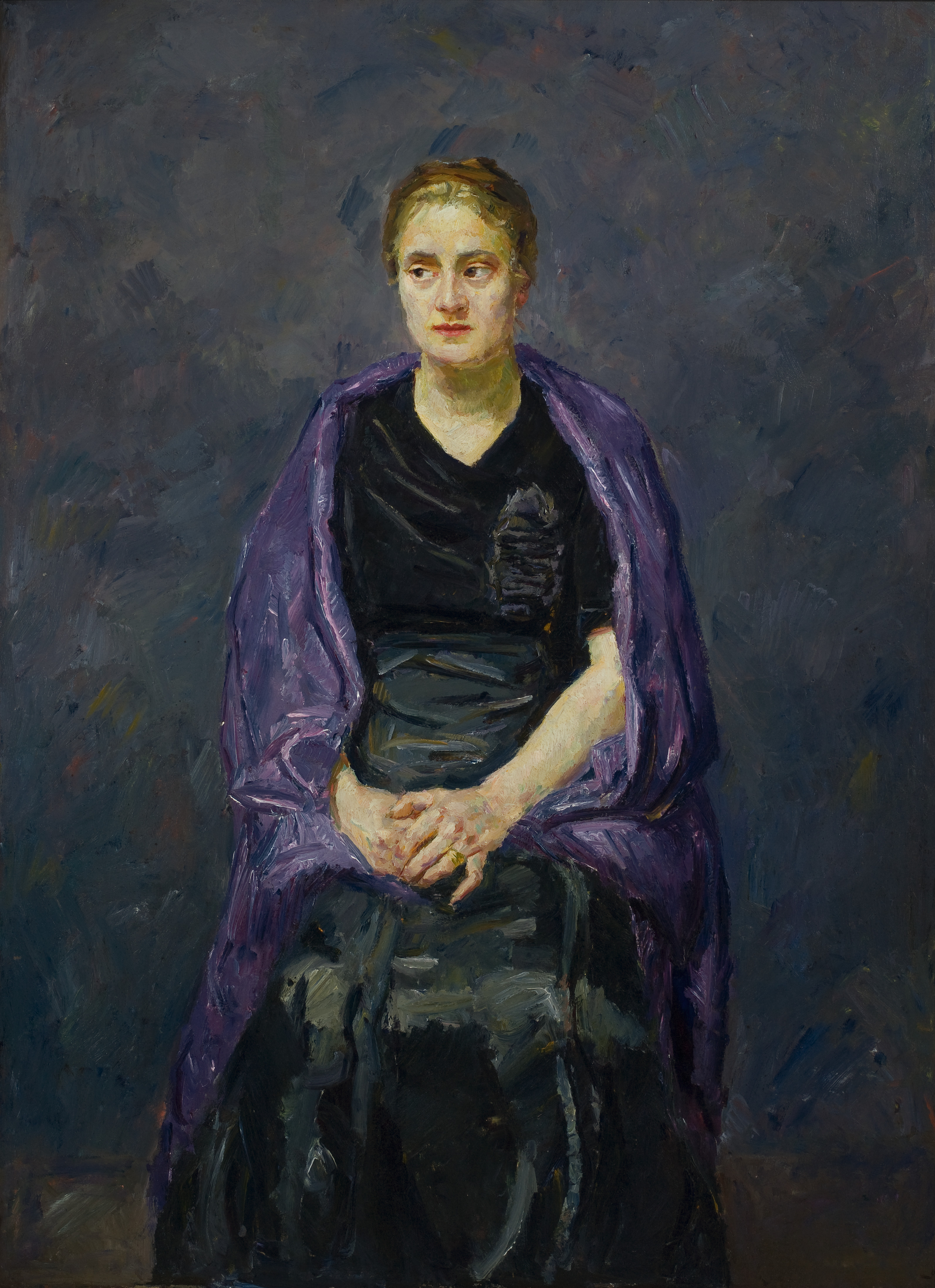
- Artist: Max Beckmann
- Year: 1910
- Medium: Oil on canvas
- Dimensions: 136.5 cm × 100.5 cm (53.7 in × 39.6 in)
- Location: Saint Louis Art Museum; Saint Louis

Portrait of Mink with Violet Shawl is an oil-on-canvas portrait by German painter Max Beckmann. It depicts his first wife, the opera singer Minna Beckmann-Tube, and was executed in 1910. It is held in the collection of the Saint Louis Art Museum.

== Description and analysis ==
The painting depicts Minna, also known as Mink, seated in a chair, wearing a black dress, with a violet shawl covering her shoulders and arms, her hands folded, while she looks quietly to her left. The background appears in a bluish colour.

The portrait was executed during the painter's twenties, when he was openly critical of the more modern contemporary art tendencies, such as expressionism, fauvism and cubism. Beckmann still follows German impressionism, reflecting the influence of Max Liebermann, in particular in his somber tonalities, but without his brushwork, or the brilliance of Lovis Corinth. His style is more conservative and still close to realism.

== Provenance ==
The painting was bequested by Morton D. May to the Saint Louis Art Museum in 1983.
