= Max Beckmann Gesellschaft =

German artistic association

The Max Beckmann Gesellschaft (English: Max Beckmann Society) is an association dedicated to the promotion of research on the life and work of German painter Max Beckmann. It also includes the Max Beckmann Archive.

== History ==
The society was founded in 1951, a few months after the artist's death, by his former student, the painter Theo Garve. It was first located in Murnau, then officially in Munich. Other founding members were Minna Beckmann-Tube, the artist's first wife, Peter Beckmann, his son, the art historian Erhard Göpel, who worked on the oeuvre catalog of Beckmann's paintings together with his wife Barbara, and Beckmann's patron Lilly von Schnitzler, as well as numerous other friends of the artist. The company was tacitly dissolved in 1984.

In 2005 it was re-established when the Friends of the Max Beckmann Archive, founded in 1996, were reorganized as the Max Beckmann Gesellschaft on the initiative of the art historian Christian Lenz.

== Purpose ==
The society has set itself the goal of promoting the research into Max Beckmann life and work. The Max Beckmann Archive, headed by Christian Lenz, in the Bayerische Staatsgemäldesammlungen, at the Kunstareal in Munich, collects materials and documents, publishes an annual report and organizes lectures and exhibitions on the artist. Their annual reunion takes place on February 12, Max Beckmann's birthday, in the Neue Pinakothek in Munich.
