= La Mariée =

1950 painting by Marc Chagall

- The Bride (English)
- Artist: Marc Chagall
- Year: 1950
- Medium: Gouache, pastel
- Dimensions: 68 cm × 53 cm (27 in × 21 in)
- Owner: Private collection, Japan

La Mariée (French for The Bride) is a gouache and pastel painting by Belarusian-French artist Marc Chagall, from 1950. It is held in a private collection in Japan. La Mariée was prominently featured in the 1999 film Notting Hill.

== The painting ==
Chagall paintings often feature young women or couples, but in La Mariée, the focus is on a young bride. Described by a Chagall fan as "an ode to young love," the painting presents the bride as if the viewer were the one marrying her.

=== Colours ===
The second peculiarity of La Mariée, in comparison with other Chagall paintings, is the choice of colours. The young woman wears a red dress and a white veil, while the background is mostly a mix of blue and gray. This effect allows the image of the woman to jump off the canvas and draw the viewer's attention.

=== Images in La Mariée ===
The wedding is the major theme of the painting, and includes a feature found in other Chagall paintings and in many other European artworks of the twentieth century, animals playing musical instruments. In this case it's a goat playing a cello. The painting also shows a man hanging over the head of the bride with his hands on her veil, a church which stands in the background almost as an afterthought, a man playing a flute, a girl with pigtails, a fish with arms holding a candle and a chair, several more buildings, and a squirrel.

== Notting Hill ==
In the 1999 film Notting Hill, Julia Roberts' character Anna Scott sees a poster of La Mariée in the home of Hugh Grant's character, William Thacker. Later in the film Anna, in proclaiming her love for William, gives him the original.

According to director Roger Michell in an article in Entertainment Weekly, the painting was chosen because screenwriter Richard Curtis was a fan of Chagall's work, and because La Mariée "depicts a yearning for something that's lost." Producers had a reproduction made for use in the film, but had to first get permission from the painting's owners and obtain clearance from the British Design and Artists Copyright Society. The reproduction was created by British artist, Thomasina Smith. According to producer Duncan Kenworthy, "... we had to agree to destroy it. They were concerned that if our fake was too good, it might float around the market and create problems." The article notes that the real painting could have been "worth between $500,000 and $1 million." A closely related work by Chagall, also called La Mariée, was sold in 2003 by Christie's for just above US$1 million.

== See also ==
- List of artworks by Marc Chagall
- 1950 in art
