= Quappi in Pink Jumper =

Painting by Max Beckmann

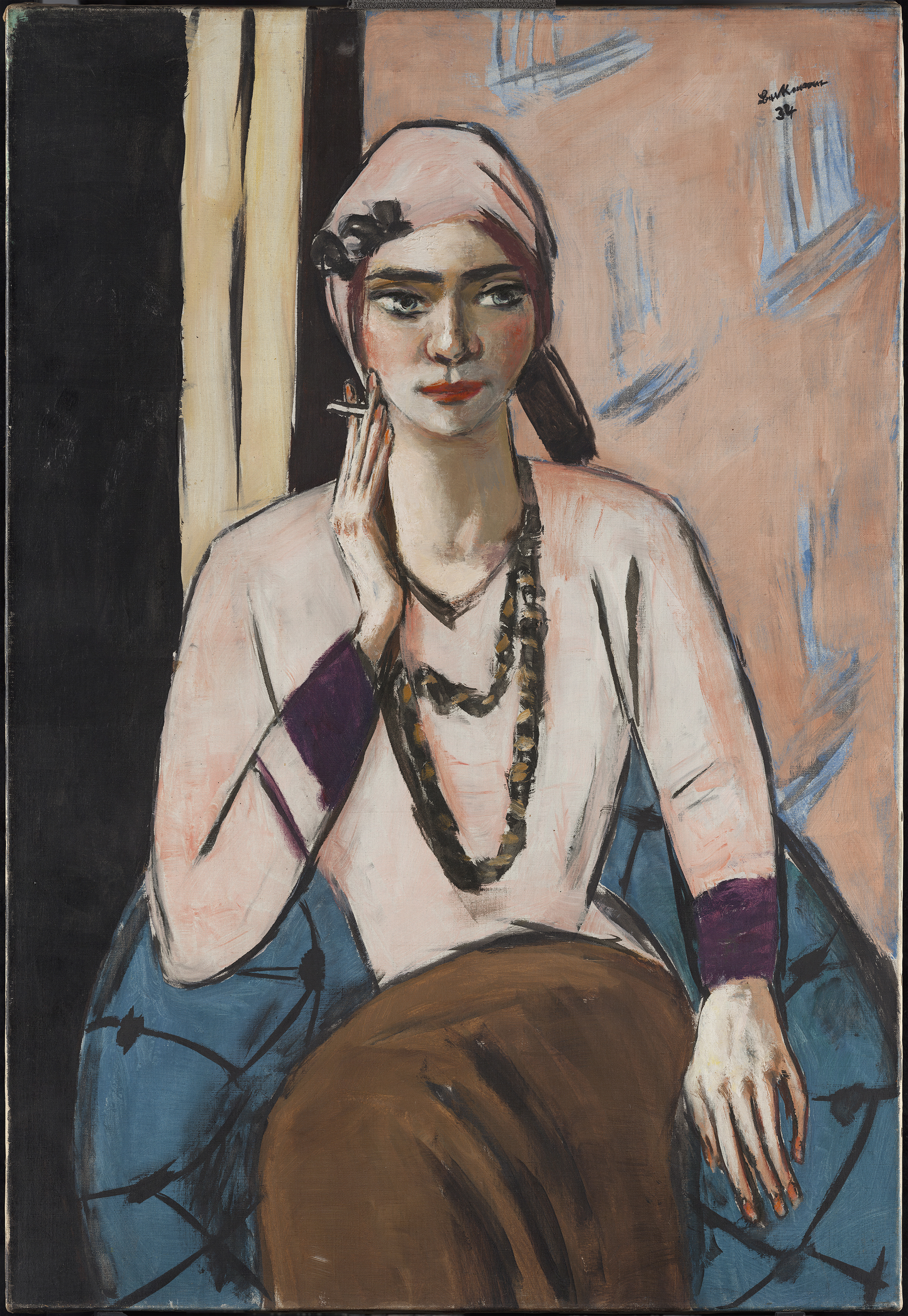
- Artist: Max Beckmann
- Year: 1932–1934
- Medium: Oil on canvas
- Dimensions: 105 cm × 73 cm (41 in × 29 in)
- Location: Thyssen-Bornemisza Museum; Madrid

Quappi in Pink Jumper is an oil-on-canvas painting by German artist Max Beckmann, executed between 1932 and 1934. The painting is in the collections of the Thyssen-Bornemisza Museum in Madrid.

== Description ==
Beckmann's characteristically harsh style began to soften noticeably since the mid-1920s, which coincided with his acquaintance and marriage to Matilda von Kaulbach, also known as Quappi, the artist's second wife.

The distinctive black outline, formerly of a bitter contempt for modern society, now sets off the beautiful features of his young wife. Quappi is depicted sitting in an armchair, wearing a pink kerchief, dressed in a pink jumper and a brown skirt, with her legs crossed, holding a cigarette in her right hand. Beckmann's quick brush turns the fashionable Quappi into the prototype of a modern woman, determined and confident. Beckmann began work on the portrait in 1932 and finished it in 1934, changing the date and making Quappi less smiling to better reflect the couple's concerns about the Nazi rise to power.
