= Marie-Louise von Motesiczky =

Austrian artist (1906–1996)

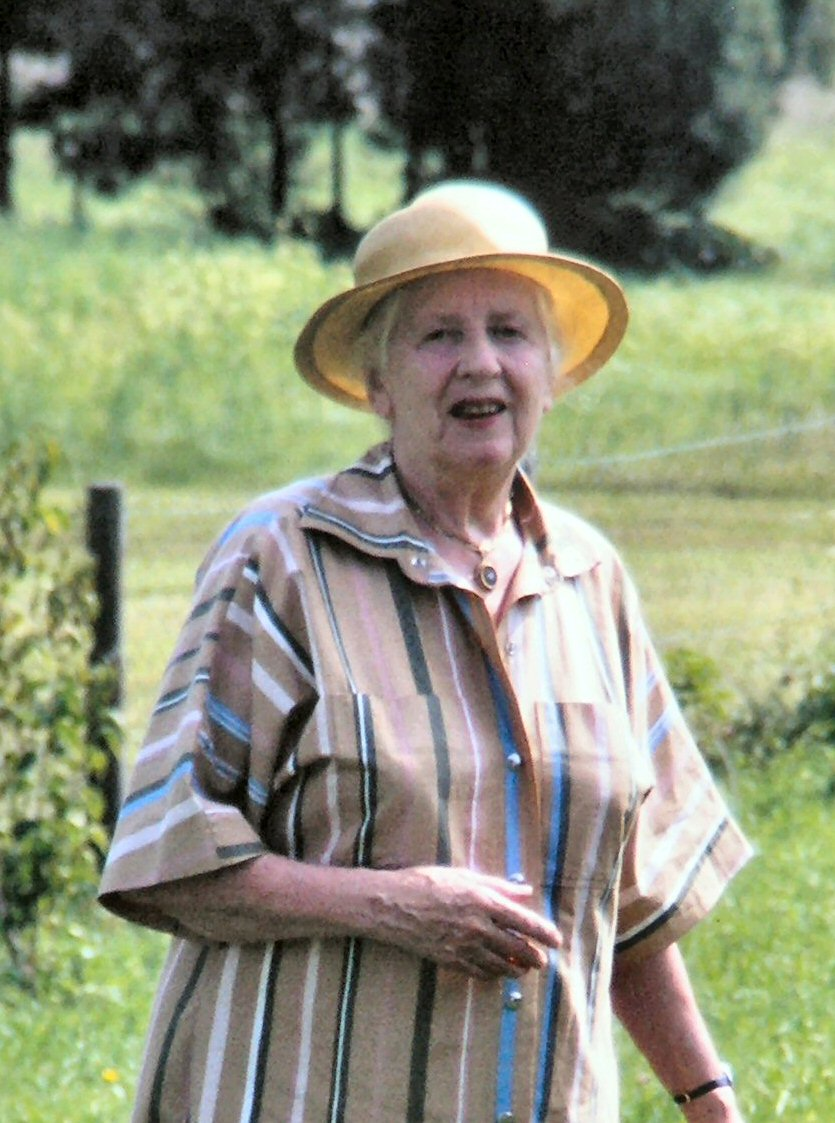
Marie Louise von Motesiczky, 1988

Marie-Louise von Motesiczky (24 October 1906 – 10 June 1996) was an Austrian-born British painter. She lived in Britain from 1939 onwards, and became a naturalised subject in 1948.

== Early life ==
Marie-Louise von Motesiczky was born in Vienna in 1906 to Edmund von Motesiczky (1866–1909) and Henriette von Lieben (1882–1978). Edmund was the illegitimate son of Franz Ritter von Hauer (1822–1899), Director of the Naturhistorisches Museum in Vienna, but was given the surname of his mother's husband Matthias Motesiczky and partly brought up by the family of the conductor Franz Schalk. Edmund had considerable musical talent, becoming a gifted (amateur) cellist. Her mother, Henriette von Lieben, came from one of the most wealthy and cultured families in the Habsburg Empire. They had donated many of the artworks in the Kunsthistorisches Museum, and, in their palatial salon opposite the opera, Hugo von Hofmannsthal had read his first poems. Their own art collection at the family's country estate in Hinterbrühl was formidable. In order to marry Henriette, who was Jewish, in 1903, Edmund von Motesiczky renounced Catholicism to enter the Protestant Church, which Henriette did likewise. Their two children Karl Motesiczky (1904–1943) and Marie-Louise were baptised as Lutherans.

The von Liebens were steeped in the social and intellectual life of Vienna as well as having an impact on the early history of psychoanalysis. Marie-Louise's grandmother Anna von Lieben (née Todesco), was one of Sigmund Freud's patients in the 1890s, referred to under the pseudonym of ‘Cäcilie M’. Henriette’s family divided their time between central Vienna and the Villa Todesco at Hinterbrühl in the Wienerwald south-west of Vienna, where Marie-Louise was to spend the summers of her childhood and early adult life.

== Life and work ==
After leaving school at only thirteen, Marie-Louise attended art classes in Vienna, The Hague, Frankfurt, Paris and Berlin. In 1927/28 she was invited by Max Beckmann to join his master class at the Städelschule in Frankfurt. Beckmann had been introduced to the Motesiczky family in 1920 and it was through them that he met the singer Mathilde von Kaulbach (‘Quappi’, 1904–86), who became his second wife in 1925. Beckmann was a lifelong friend and mentor to Marie-Louise whose influence can be seen in her early portraiture and still-lifes, and the allegorical subjects from the 1940s onwards. The second great influence on her work after Max Beckmann was Oskar Kokoschka. Her large circle of friends also included the sculptor Marie Duras, the art historian Sir Ernst Gombrich and the artist Milein Cosman.

The day after the Anschluss (the annexation of Austria into the German Third Reich) on 12 March 1938, Marie-Louise and her mother Henriette left Vienna, going to Holland where Marie-Louise’s aunt, Ilse von Leembruggen, lived in the Hague. There she had her first solo exhibition in January 1939, but soon left with her mother for England, travelling via Switzerland. In London they renewed their acquaintance with Oskar Kokoschka (1886-1980) and met the writer Elias Canetti (1905–94) with whom Marie-Louise was to develop a relationship that lasted for more than thirty years, and a correspondence that continued until 1992. Canetti dedicated a collection of aphorisms to 'Marie-Louise' in 1942 (these were published posthumously). Marie-Louise's portrait of Canetti is in the National Portrait Gallery in London. Her brother Karl had stayed behind in Vienna; he was able to send a substantial part of their possessions to London, including Marie-Louise’s paintings. These were eventually installed in the house in Amersham in Buckinghamshire, bought by Marie-Louise and her mother in 1941 to be out of reach of bombing raids on London. Wherever Marie-Louise lived from then on – in Amersham and then in Hampstead – space was provided not only for her studio, but for Canetti’s library from Vienna and Canetti himself. Canetti repaid her kindness by bestowing her with an autograph manuscript of what he called his aphorisms for Marie-Louise in 1942 which were published 50 years later.

In Britain, von Motesiczky joined the Artists’ International Association and exhibited at the Czechoslovak Institute in London in 1944. After the War she rented a flat in London while her mother stayed in Amersham until 1960, when they moved into a large house at 6 Chesterford Gardens in Hampstead that was to be their home for the rest of their lives. Two solo exhibitions in the Hague and Amsterdam in 1952 were followed by others in Germany and Austria in the 1950s and 60s. After the move to Chesterford Gardens Marie-Louise’s time was increasingly dominated by the demands of caring for her mother. This prompted what was in many respects her most remarkable body of work: a series of unflinching portraits of her mother, expressive of the ravages of age but also the deep emotional bond between the two women. They showed the development of a distinctive style and subject matter of Marie-Louise’s own, moving on from the influence of Beckmann and Kokoschka. Yet for all her reclusiveness, Marie-Louise delighted in company and in her irregular salons which attracted such celebrities as Sir Ernst Gombrich, Hans Keller, Milein Cosman, Bettina Gross and H.G. Adler as well as upcoming talents such as the young Edmund de Waal and Jeremy Adler.

The first success in her native country came in 1966 when the Wiener Secession staged a large solo exhibition which subsequently travelled to Linz, Bremen and Munich. Her breakthrough in the UK occurred in 1985, with a major retrospective at the Goethe Institute in London, which generated much acclaim and saw her reputation as a major Austrian artist cemented. However, on the subject of exhibiting, as the artist's friend and executor Jeremy Adler wrote in his obituary for her, "Motesiczky never needed to sell her paintings, indeed she preferred to keep them around her". An aristocratic disdain for the marketplace meant that, while she half welcomed exhibitions, they remained uncomfortable experiences." The retrospective was accompanied by essays from Gunther Busch, Richard Calvocoressi and Ernst Gombrich. The Tate Gallery acquired three paintings and the exhibition travelled to the Fitzwilliam Museum in Cambridge. The last major exhibition of her lifetime took place at the Österreichische Galerie Belvedere in Vienna in 1994. Marie-Louise died in London on 10 June 1996. Her ashes were consigned to the family grave at the Döbling Cemetery in Vienna.

== Posthumous recognition ==
View from the Window, Vienna (painted 1925)

At her death in 1996, the collection, along with the bulk of her possessions, passed into her estate and the executors subsequently made it over to the Trust set up in 1992 for the preservation and promotion of her work, support of the arts and other charitable objects. It received charitable status on 21 November 1996 as the Marie-Louise von Motesiczky Charitable Trust. A centenary exhibition was organised in 2006-07, starting at Tate Liverpool and travelling to Frankfurt, Vienna and Passau, then to Southampton Art Gallery in Britain. This was followed by the publication of a biography in 2007, a catalogue raisonné of the artist’s paintings in 2009 and two exhibitions at Galerie St Etienne in New York in 2010 and 2014. In recent years, the Trust has been making donations of Marie-Louise’s work to public collections. She is represented in local, regional, university and national museums in Britain, the Republic of Ireland, Austria, Germany, the Netherlands and the USA. The great majority of Marie-Louise’s drawings and sketchbooks, the archive of her and her family’s papers, along with other documentary items connected to her life and work, have been presented to Tate where the Archive Gallery at Tate Britain has been named for her.

Of her life in art, she once remarked “If you could only paint a single good picture in your lifetime, your life would be worthwhile.”

Diana Athill wrote about her friendship with Motesiczky in her memoir 'Somewhere Towards the End' (Granta, 2008).

In 2022 a commemorative plaque was installed at her former home at 6, Chesterford Gardens, NW3, supported by the Heath and Hampstead society.

She is represented in local, regional, university and national museums in the following countries:

- Austria:
  - Lentos Kunst Museum, Linz.
  - Museum Kunst der verlorenen Generation, Salzburg.
  - Leopold Museum, Vienna
- United Kingdom:
  - Amersham Museum, Amersham
- Germany:
  - Staedel Museum, Frankfurt

== Literature ==
- Jeremy Adler, Birgit Sander (Hrsg.): Marie-Louise von Motesiczky (1906-1996). Prestel, München 2006, ISBN 978-3-7913-3693-0 (Catalogue of Exhibition in Liverpool 11. April to 13. August 2006).
- Elias Canetti, Marie-Louise von Motesiczky: Liebhaber ohne Adresse – Briefwechsel 1942-1992 (published by Ines Schlenker and Kristian Wachinger), Hanser, München 2011, ISBN 978-3-446-23735-3
- Evi Fuks u. a. (Hrsg.): Die Lieben. 150 Jahre Geschichte einer Wiener Familie. Böhlau-Verlag, Wien 2005, ISBN 978-3-205-77321-4 (Catalogue of Exhibition in Vienna 11. November 2004 to 3. April 2005).
- Jill Lloyd: The Undiscovered Expressionist. A Life of Marie-Louise Von Motesiczky. Yale University Press, New Haven, Conn. 2007, ISBN 978-0-300-12154-4 (Vorschau auf englisch)
- Eva Michel: Marie-Louise von Motesiczky (1906-1996). Eine österreichische Schülerin von Max Beckmann. Universität Wien 2003 (unpublished Masters Thesis).
- Sabine Plakholm-Forsthuber: Künstlerinnen in Österreich 1897-1938. Picus-Verlag, Wien 1994, ISBN 978-3-85452-122-8.
- Stephan Reimertz: Max Beckmann. Biographie. Rowohlt, Reinbek 2006, ISBN 978-3-499-50558-4.
- Klaus Schröder: Neue Sachlichkeit, Österreich 1918-38. Kunstforum Bank Austria, Wien 1995 (Catalogue of Exhibition in Vienna 1. April to2. July 1995).
- Elias Canetti: Aufzeichnungen für Marie-Louise, edited by Jeremy Adler ISBN 9783446205949 Hanser. Munich (2005)
