= Stephan Reimertz =

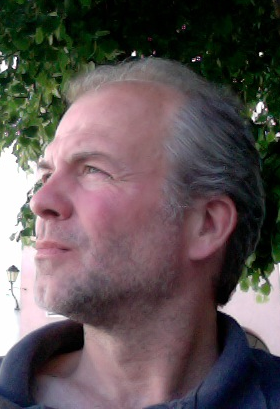
- Born: 4 March 1962 (age 64); Aachen, West Germany
- Resting place: Paris
- Education: LMU Munich, Free University of Berlin
- Occupations: Poet, writer, art historian
- Writing career
- Language: German, French
- Genres: Poems, novels, biographies
- Notable works: Papiergewicht; Eine Liebe im Porträt; Max Beckmann

Stephan Reimertz (born 4 March 1962) is a German poet, essayist, novelist and art historian.

== Life ==
Born in Aachen, West Germany, Reimertz is the grandnephew of Nikolaus Groß, resistance fighter in the 20th July plot against Hitler. His grandfather was a democratic major and politician from Westphalia. His father was a mining engineer and met his mother at RWTH Aachen; she was a pharmacist from Riga and of Baltic German ethnicity. Reimertz was raised at his grandmothers in the medieval village of Niederwenigern on the Ruhr Peninsula, later attended school in Kronberg, where he joined the Catholic Boy Scouts.

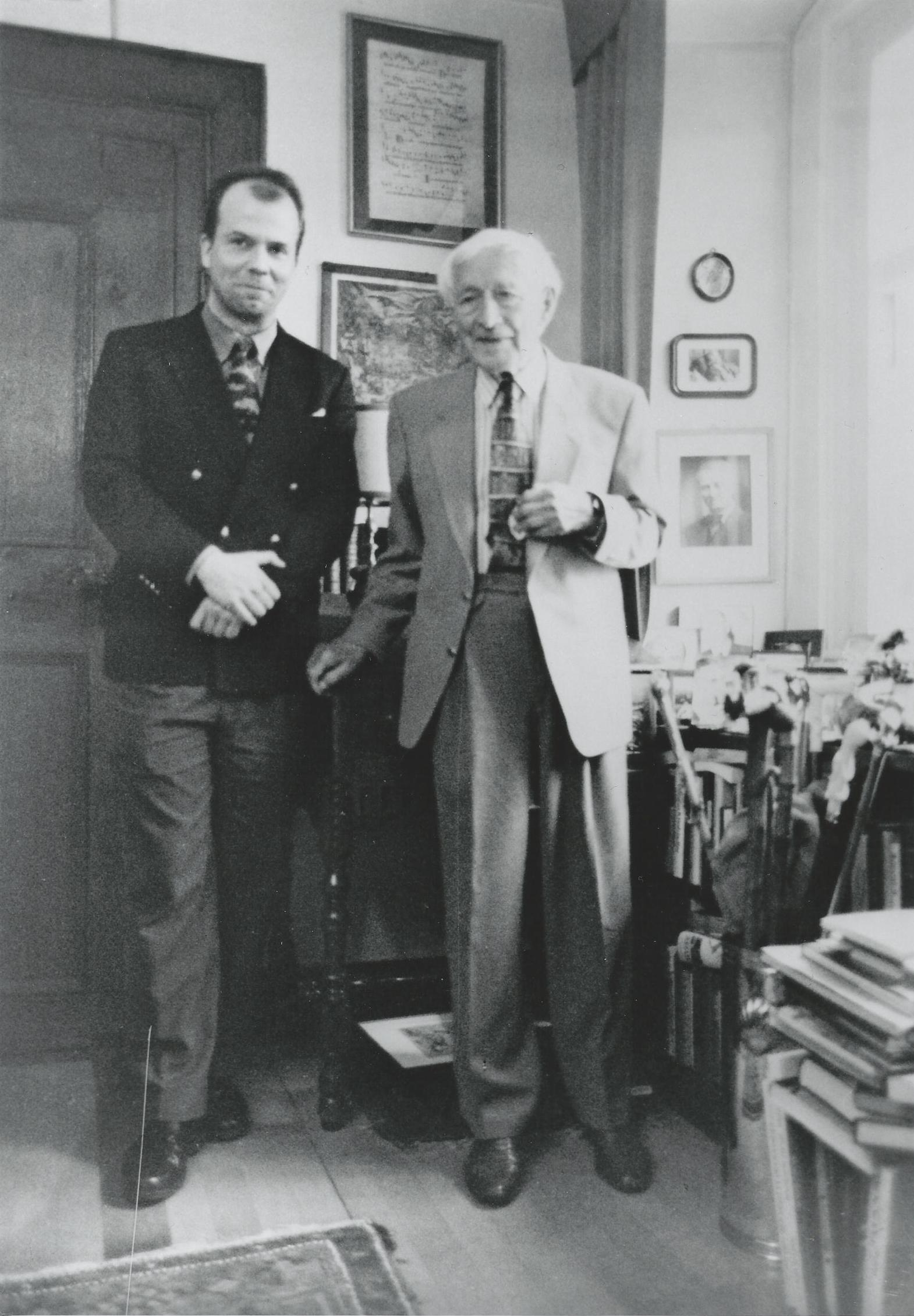
Ernst Jünger and Stephan Reimertz

A grantee of the German National Merit Foundation, the German Academic Exchange Service, etc., Reimertz went to college at LMU Munich and graduated with an MA in comparative literature and a doctorate in art history and philosophy from FU Berlin. He has taught at Juniata College in Huntingdon, Pennsylvania, and was a Fulbright grantee at University of Texas at Austin, and a research fellow at Washington University in St. Louis. Reimertz dedicated a monograph to Woody Allen and the American cinema.

== Works ==
In art history, Reimertz followed Hans Sedlmayr’s method of structural analysis (Strukturanalyse), calling on the discipline of art history to move past empirical research and reveal the aesthetic nature of the artwork. His monograph on the German artist Max Beckmann connects structural analysis with a cultural historiographic narrative and is considered a benchmark in modern art history.

Reimertz’s first novel, Eine Liebe im Portrait ("A Love in Portraiture"), was released in 1996, featuring the fate of the artist Minna Tube, a painter who became a celebrated mezzo-soprano after her husband Max Beckmann had banned her from painting. Reimertz set up a new style of Realroman ("reality novel"), using only authentic quotations and composing them in an artistic narrative structure, thus combining the French tradition of biographie romancée with the German classical forms of Künstlerroman and Bildungsroman.

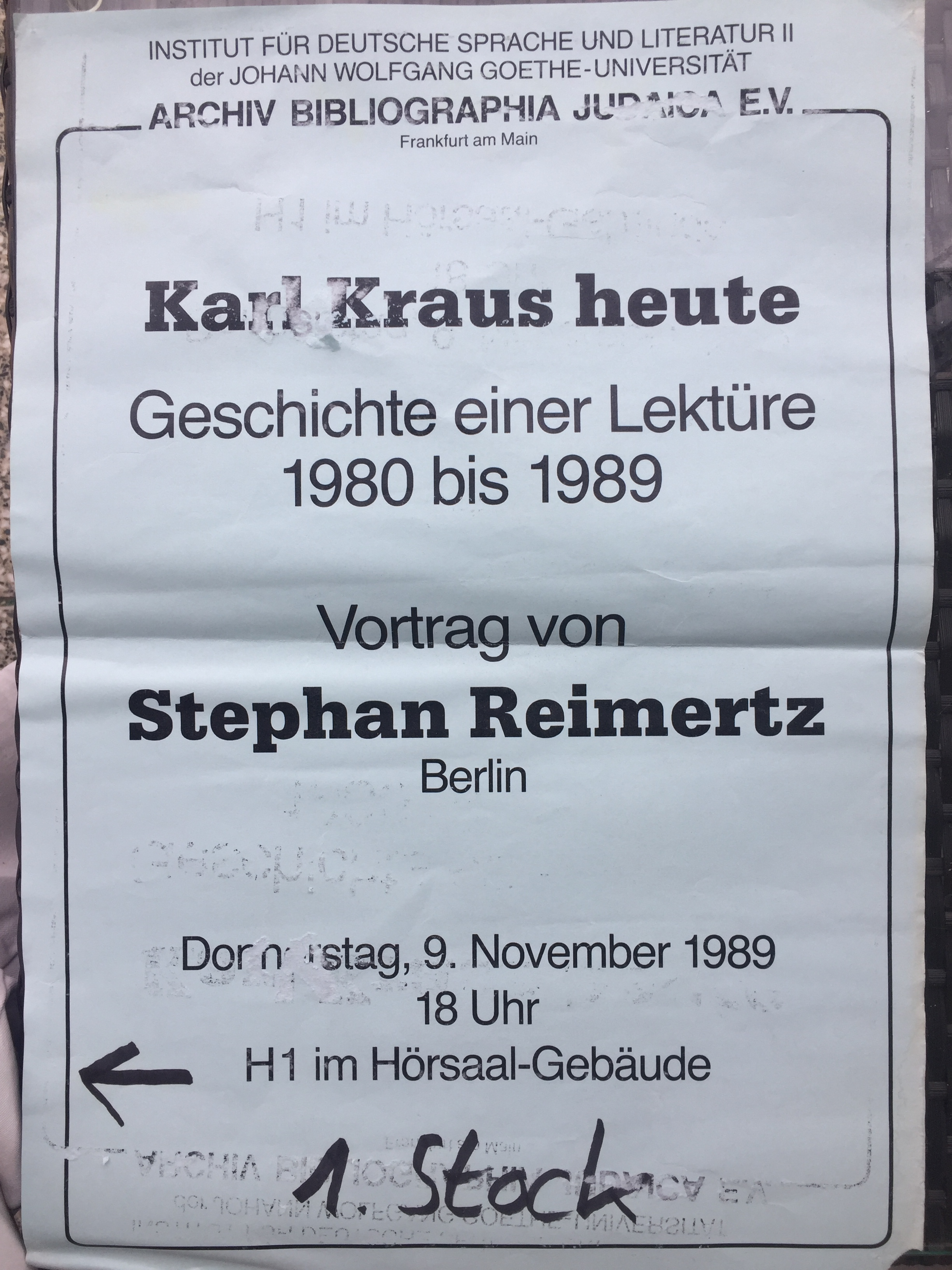
Karl Kraus Lecture by Stephan Reimertz Frankfurt University 9. Nov. 1989

In 2001, Stephan Reimertz authored Papiergewicht ("Paper Weight"), an autobiographical novel set in a decadent upper-class family, reflecting the social changes of the early Seventies.

== Selected bibliography ==
The books he has written are:

=== Novels ===
- Eine Liebe im Porträt. Rowohlt, Reinbek 1996. ISBN 3-499-22768-1
- Papiergewicht. Luchterhand, Munich 2001, ISBN 3-630-87086-4

=== Non Fiction ===
- Max Beckmann, (rororo-Monographie). Rowohlt, Reinbek 1995. ISBN 3-499-50558-4
- Vom Genuß des Tees. Eine heitere Reise durch alte Landschaften, ehrwürdige Traditionen und moderne Verhältnisse, inklusive einer kleinen Teeschule. Gustav Kiepenheuer, Leipzig 1998, ISBN 3-378-01023-1
- Woody Allen. Eine Biographie. Rowohlt, Reinbek 2000, ISBN 3-499-61145-7
- Max Beckmann. Biographie. Luchterhand, Munich 2003. ISBN 3-630-88006-1
- Woody Allen (rororo-Monographie). Rowohlt, Reinbek 2005, ISBN 3-499-50410-3
