= Departure (Beckmann) =

Painting by Max Beckmann

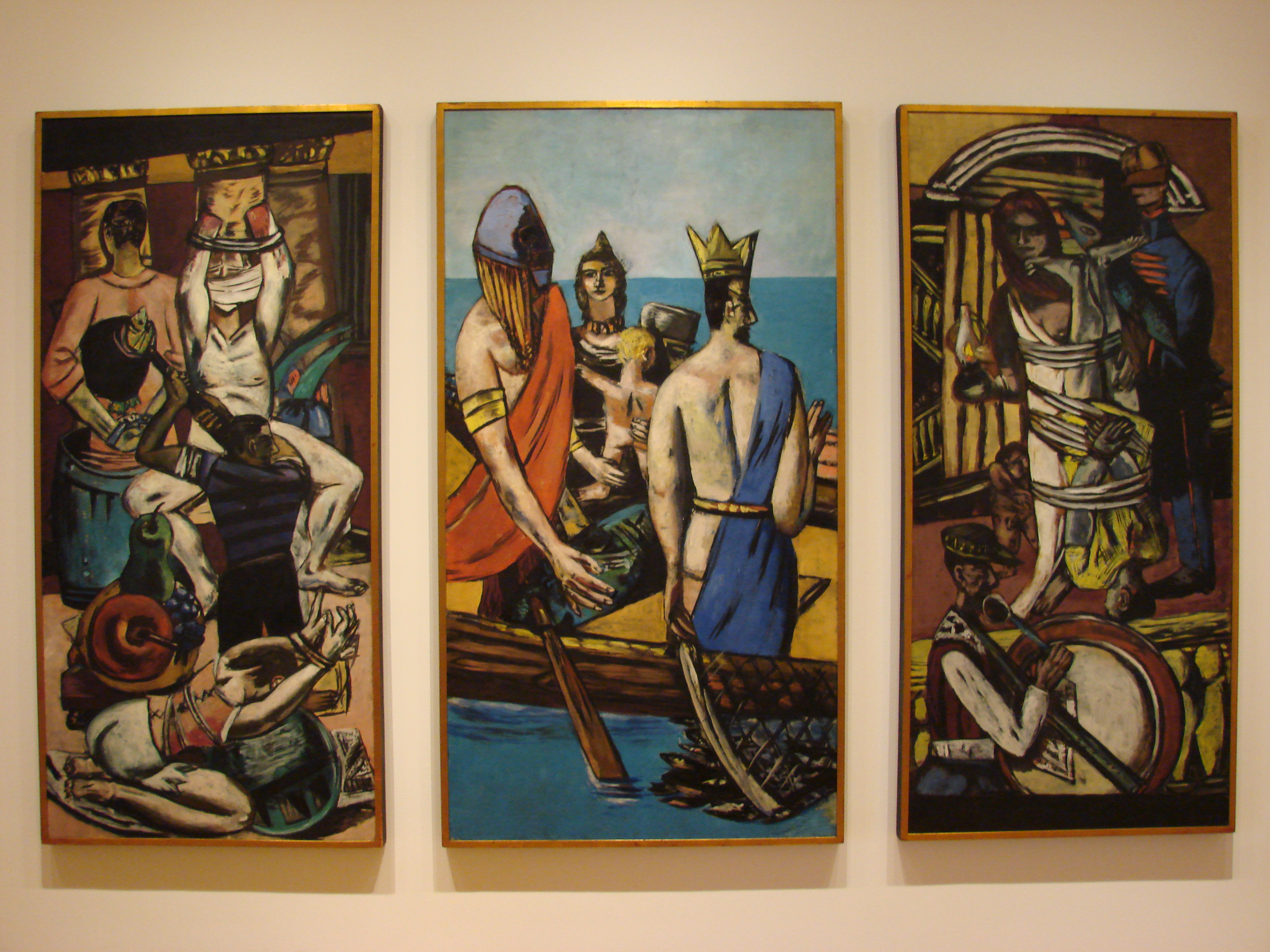
- Artist: Max Beckmann
- Year: 1932–1935
- Medium: Oil on canvas
- Dimensions: 215.5 cm × 314 cm (84.8 in × 124 in)
- Location: Museum of Modern Art; New York

Departure is an oil-on-canvas triptych by the German artist Max Beckmann begun in Frankfurt in 1932 and completed in Berlin from 1933 to 1935. It was the first of nine triptychs that the artist created. The panels, according to Beckmann, are named The Castle (left), The Homecoming (middle) and The Staircase (right). The paintings have all the same height (215.5 cm) and the middle panel, with 115 cm, is only slightly wider than the other two, which have 99.5 cm in length. It is one of his best-known triptychs and is held at the Museum of Modern Art, in New York.

== History and description ==
The triptych was started at the final years of the Weimar Republic and finished in the first years after the takeover of Nazism. The significance of the scenes depicted is enigmatic. Both the side panels show images of sadistic violence. At the left, possibly a torture chamber, a woman is tied down upon a crystal ball. To her left, a strange still life is seen, and behind her is a man in a striped shirt, possibly an executioner, holding an axe. A gagged man whose hands have been severed is tied by his arms to one of the three pillars at the background, his closed eyes showing an expression of deep pain. At his right, a woman is seen from behind, with her hands tied.

In the right panel, a woman is tied to an upside-down man. Next to the woman is a blindfolded man in a bellhop uniform, and behind her is a naked dwarf. In the foreground is a drummer. Unlike the figures in the left panel, the figures in the right panel are constrained but not tortured.

The central panel, by the opposite, showing a scene in a blue sky and in a blue sea, seems to represent a chance of hope and salvation from this violence, depicting the departure of a king, most likely the Fisher King, with his back turned, who grasps a net of fish, while giving a blessing. At his left, an enigmatic hooded man holds a fish. The queen, at the background, holds his son, while faces the viewer. Beckmann described this scene stating: "The King and Queen have freed themselves... The Queen carries the greatest treasure – Freedom – as her child in her lap. Freedom is the one thing that matters – it is the departure, the new start."

Despite the political background of the time, Beckmann denied that this was a political work: "Departure bears no tendentious meaning – it could well be applied to all times."
