= Notting Hill (film) =

1999 film by Roger Michell

- American theatrical release poster
- Directed by: Roger Michell
- Written by: Richard Curtis
- Produced by: Duncan Kenworthy
- Starring: Julia Roberts; Hugh Grant; Hugh Bonneville; Emma Chambers; James Dreyfus; Rhys Ifans; Tim McInnerny; Gina McKee
- Cinematography: Michael Coulter
- Edited by: Nick Moore
- Music by: Trevor Jones
- Production companies: PolyGram Filmed Entertainment; Working Title Films
- Distributed by: Universal Pictures (Select territories); PolyGram Filmed Entertainment (International)
- Release dates: 21 May 1999 (United Kingdom); 28 May 1999 (United States)
- Running time: 124 minutes
- Countries: United Kingdom; United States
- Language: English
- Budget: $42 million
- Box office: $364 million

Notting Hill is a 1999 romantic comedy film directed by Roger Michell, written by Richard Curtis, and produced by Duncan Kenworthy. It stars Julia Roberts and Hugh Grant, with Rhys Ifans, Emma Chambers, Tim McInnerny, Gina McKee, and Hugh Bonneville in supporting roles. The story is of a romance between a British bookshop keeper (Grant) and a famous American actress (Roberts) who happens to walk into his shop in London's Notting Hill district.

Released on 21 May 1999 in the United Kingdom by PolyGram Filmed Entertainment and on 28 May 1999 in the United States by Universal Pictures, Notting Hill was well received by critics and was the highest-grossing British film of all time upon release, which has since been eclipsed. At the 57th Golden Globe Awards, the film received three nominations – Best Motion Picture – Musical or Comedy, Best Actress – Motion Picture Musical or Comedy (Roberts) and Best Actor – Motion Picture Musical or Comedy (Grant). It also earned two BAFTA nominations, and won a British Comedy Award and a Brit Award for its soundtrack.

== Plot ==
William Thacker owns a travel book store in Notting Hill, London. Divorced from his wife who left him for another man (who resembles Harrison Ford), he shares a flat with Spike, a flaky and sloppy Welshman.

One day, famous Hollywood actress Anna Scott enters the shop and buys a book. Shortly after she leaves, Will goes to buy his colleague Martin a juice, but bumps into Anna while rounding a street corner, spilling it on her. He takes her to his flat across the street so she can change. When leaving, she impulsively kisses him.

Anna later invites Will to visit her at the Ritz Hotel. There, he is mistaken for a reporter and ushered into a press event for her new film. When asked, Will says he writes for Horse & Hound magazine. Anna asks to be William's date at his sister Honey's birthday party later that evening. Though his friends and family are surprised, she gets on well with everyone and enjoys herself. Later, the two enter a private neighbourhood park, where Anna again kisses Will.

At a restaurant, Will and Anna overhear a party of men at a nearby table discussing her, first praising and then disparaging her and equating actresses to prostitutes. He confronts them, then she introduces herself and calmly insults the stunned men.

Anna invites Will to her hotel room, but after discovering that her movie star boyfriend, Jeff, has unexpectedly arrived from America, he leaves. Over the next six months, Will's friends Max, Bella, Bernie and Tony arrange a series of dates for him, but Will, heartsick over Anna, is uninterested in another relationship.

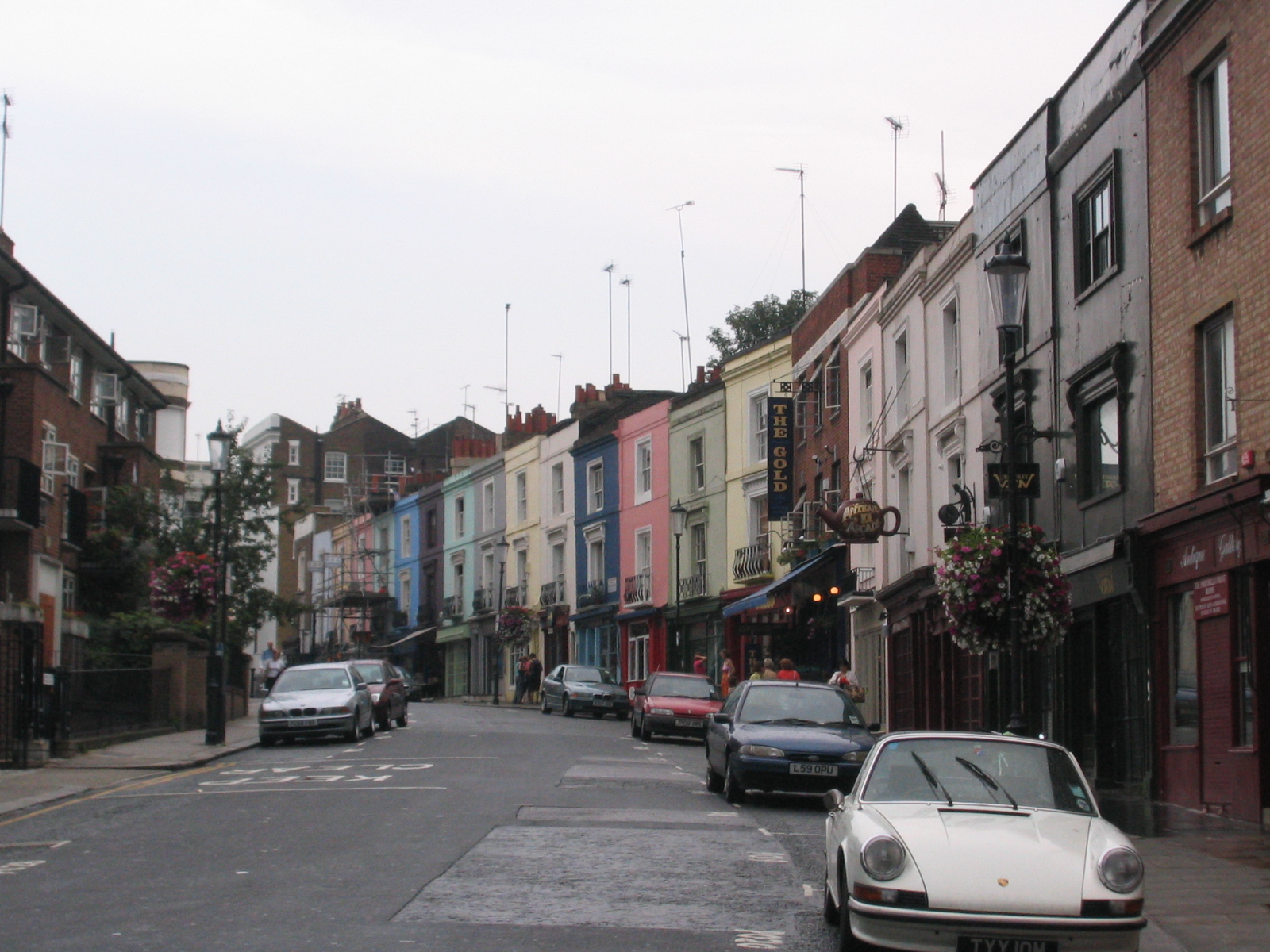
Much of the filming took place on Portobello Road.

One day, a distraught Anna appears at Will's doorstep, needing to hide due to a tabloid scandal. She apologises about Jeff and says their relationship is over. They discover shared interests, and discuss Will's print of Marc Chagall's 1950 painting La Mariée. Anna says it shows "how love should be" and that "happiness isn't happiness without a violin-playing goat" as depicted in the painting. They have sex that night. The next morning paparazzi, inadvertently tipped off by Spike, besiege the house and take photos of Will, Anna, and a half-dressed Spike at the front door. Furious, she blames Will and leaves.

Several seasons pass, and Will remains miserable. When he discovers that Anna is back in London making a film based on a Henry James novel, something he had suggested, he visits the set unannounced. She asks him to wait until the shooting is done, but he leaves when overhearing her being dismissive about him to another actor.

Anna comes to the bookshop the next day, bringing a wrapped gift. Will says he overheard what she said about him to her co-star. Anna explains that she was merely trying to keep her personal life private. She proclaims that she loves him, and pleads to rekindle their relationship. Will refuses, explaining that he would not recover if she left him again.

Will meets his friends and sister at a restaurant with Anna's partly opened gift: Chagall's original La Mariée ("The Bride"). They halfheartedly support his decision about Anna until Spike arrives and calls him a "daft prick". Will admits his mistake, and everyone races across London to find Anna, who is holding a press conference at the Savoy Hotel. They arrive just as her publicist, in answer to a question about how long Anna will stay in Britain, announces that Anna is taking a year off and is leaving the UK that night.

A reporter asks about the embarrassing photographs taken at Will's flat, and Anna says they are just friends. Will, again portraying a reporter from Horse and Hound, asks her if she would consider being more than friends if he begs her forgiveness. She says she would, then requests a reporter to repeat his question, "How long are you intending to stay here in Britain?" Smiling, she answers "Indefinitely".

Anna and Will marry, their wedding cake featuring the violin-playing goat from La Mariée. Spike and Honey also marry. Anna is later seen to be pregnant as she and Will spend time in the private park that they visited on their first date.

== Cast ==
- Julia Roberts as Anna Scott
- Hugh Grant as William "Will" Thacker
- Hugh Bonneville as Bernie
- Emma Chambers as Honey Thacker
- James Dreyfus as Martin
- Rhys Ifans as Spike Andersen
- Tim McInnerny as Max
- Gina McKee as Bella
- Richard McCabe as Tony
- Dylan Moran as Rufus the thief
- Henry Goodman as the Ritz concierge
- Julian Rhind-Tutt as Time Out journalist
- Lorelei King as Karen, Anna's publicist
- John Shrapnel as Anna's UK press agent
- Clarke Peters as Helix lead actor
- Arturo Venegas as actor in Helix
- Yolanda Vázquez as interpreter
- Mischa Barton as 12-year-old actress in Helix
- Emily Mortimer as Perfect Girl
- Samuel West as Anna's co-star (as Sam West)
- Ann Beach as William's mother
- Patrick Barlow as Savoy concierge

Uncredited cast

- Alec Baldwin as Jeff King
- Simon Callow as himself in Film-within-Film
- Joe Cornish as Fan Receiving Anna's Autograph
- Matthew Modine as Actor in Film-within-Film
- Sally Phillips as Caroline (scenes deleted)

Casting notes

- Julia Roberts was the "one and only" choice for the role of Anna Scott, although Roger Michell and Duncan Kenworthy did not expect her to accept. Her agent told her it was "the best romantic comedy she had ever read". Roberts said that after reading the script she decided she was "going to have to do this".
- The decision to cast Hugh Grant as William Thacker was unanimous, as he and Richard Curtis had a "writer/actor marriage made in heaven". Michell said that "Hugh does Richard better than anyone else, and Richard writes Hugh better than anyone else", and that Grant is "one of the only actors who can speak Richard's lines perfectly".
- Mischa Barton appears as the child actor whom Will interviews for Horse & Hound.
- The casting of Bonneville, McInnerny, McKee, Chambers, and Ifans as Will's friends was "rather like assembling a family". Michell explained, "When you are casting a cabal of friends, you have to cast a balance of qualities, of types and of sensibilities. They were the jigsaw that had to be put together all in one go, and I think we've got a very good variety of people who can realistically still live in the same world."
- Sanjeev Bhaskar has a cameo role as a loud and offensive restaurant patron (who refers to Meg Ryan as "the actress who has an orgasm every time she's taken out for a cup of coffee") in the restaurant Anna and Will visit.
- Omid Djalili makes an uncredited cameo as the vendor who sells Will the orange juice that Will accidentally spills on Anna moments later.
- Science fiction author China Miéville was cast as an extra in the film, which he humorously described as a dystopian alternative history of an ethnically cleansed city.

== Production ==
"I would sometimes wonder what it would be like if I just turned up at my friends' house, where I used to have dinner once a week, with the most famous person at that time, be it Madonna or whomever. It all sprang from there. How would my friends react? Who would try and be cool? How would you get through dinner? What would they say to you afterwards?"
– Richard Curtis

Richard Curtis developed the film from thoughts while lying awake at night. He described the starting point as "the idea of a very normal person going out with an unbelievably famous person and how that impinges on their lives". In an interview with GQ in 2018, Hugh Grant claimed the film was based on real life and loosely followed a friend of Richard's who fell in love with an 'extremely world-famous person who [Grant wasn't] allowed to mention'. Much like the film, Curtis's friend was an everyday person who met the well known celebrity in a shop (Harrods) and they ended up having a relationship.

The film has been likened to "a 90's London-set version of Roman Holiday". However, Curtis has said that he had not seen the 1953 film.

Four Weddings and a Funeral director Mike Newell was approached but rejected it to work on Pushing Tin. He said that in commercial terms he had made the wrong decision, but did not regret it. The producer, Duncan Kenworthy, then turned to Roger Michell, saying that "Finding someone as good as Roger, was just like finding the right actor to play each role. Roger shone out."

Roberts originally didn't want to play the role as she thought the pitch sounded terrible, but changed her mind after reading the script.

Curtis chose Notting Hill as he lived there and knew the area, saying "Notting Hill is a melting pot and the perfect place to set a film". This left the producers to film in a heavily populated area. Kenworthy noted "Early on, we toyed with the idea of building a huge exterior set. That way we would have more control, because we were worried about having Roberts and Grant on public streets where we could get thousands of onlookers." In the end they decided to film in the streets. Michell was worried "that Hugh and Julia were going to turn up on the first day of shooting on Portobello Road, and there would be gridlock and we would be surrounded by thousands of people and paparazzi photographers who would prevent us from shooting". The location team and security personnel prevented this, as well as preventing problems the presence of a film crew might have caused the residents of Notting Hill, who Michell believes were "genuinely excited" about the film. Location manager Sue Quinn described finding locations and getting permission to film as "a mammoth task". Quinn and the rest of her team had to write to thousands of people in the area, promising to donate to each person's favourite charity, resulting in 200 charities receiving money.

"The major problem we encountered was the size of our film unit. We couldn't just go in and shoot and come out. We were everywhere. Filming on the London streets has to be done in such a way that it comes up to health and safety standards. There is no such thing as a road closure. We were very lucky in the fact that we had 100% cooperation from the police and the Council. They looked favorably on what we were trying to do and how it would promote the area."
– Sue Quinn

Stuart Craig, the production designer, was pleased to do a contemporary film, saying, "We're dealing with streets with thousands of people, market traders, shop owners and residents, which makes it really complex". Filming began on 17 April 1998 in West London and at Shepperton Studios. Will's bookshop was on Portobello Road, one of the main areas where filming took place. Other locations in Notting Hill included Westbourne Park Road, Golborne Road, Landsdowne Road and the Coronet Cinema. Will's house, 280 Westbourne Park Road, was owned by Richard Curtis and behind the entrance there is a grand house, not the flat in the film that was made up in the studios. The blue door was auctioned for charity. The current door is blue again. The Travel Book Store is located at 142 Portobello Road. After filming for six weeks in Notting Hill, filming moved to the Ritz Hotel, where it had to take place at night. Other locations were Savoy Hotel, the Nobu Restaurant, the Zen Garden of the Hempel Hotel, and Kenwood House.

One of the final scenes takes place at a film premiere, which presented difficulties. Michell wanted to film at Leicester Square but was declined. Police had found fans at a Leonardo DiCaprio premiere problematic and were concerned the same might occur at the staged premiere. Through a health and safety act, the production received permission to film and constructed the scene in 24 hours. Interior scenes were the last to be filmed, at Shepperton Studios.

The final cut was 3.5 hours long; 90 minutes were edited out for release.

The film features the 1950 Marc Chagall painting La Mariée ("The Bride"). Anna sees a print of the painting in William's home and later gives him the original. Michell said in Entertainment Weekly that the painting was chosen because Curtis was a fan of Chagall's work and because La Mariée "depicts a yearning for something that's lost." The producers had a reproduction made for the film, created by British artist Thomasina Smith, but first had to get permission from the owner as well as clearance from the Design and Artists Copyright Society. Finally, according to Kenworthy, "we had to agree to destroy it. They were concerned that if our fake was too good, it might float around the market and create problems."

The film features the book Istanbul: The Imperial City (1996) by John Freely. William recommends this book to Anna, commenting that (unlike another book in the store) the author has at least been to Istanbul. Indeed, Freely taught at Boğaziçi University in Istanbul and was the author of nine books about the city.

== Soundtrack ==
Original music was composed by Trevor Jones. A main score was written, and excerpts were used throughout the film. The score was broken down into two songs for the soundtrack (Will and Anna/Notting Hill). Several additional songs written by other artists include Elvis Costello's cover of the Charles Aznavour song "She". Aznavour's original version can be heard during the opening credits while Elvis Costello's version is played at the end of the movie (before the end credits). Other songs are Shania Twain's remixed version of "You've Got a Way", as well as Ronan Keating's specially recorded cover of "When You Say Nothing at All"; the song reached number one in the British charts. Pulp recorded a new song "Born to Cry", which was released on the European version of the soundtrack album.

The song played when Will strides down Portobello Road is "Ain't No Sunshine" by Bill Withers. Tony and Bernie play "Blue Moon" on the piano at Tony's restaurant on the night it closes. Originally, Charles Aznavour's version of "She" was used in the film, but American test screening audiences did not respond to it. Costello was then brought in by Richard Curtis to record a cover version of the song. Both versions of the song appear in non-US releases.

The soundtrack album was released by Island Records.

US version track listing
Catalog #314 546 196-2

1. "No Matter What" – Boyzone (4:33)
2. "You've Got a Way" (Notting Hill remix) – Shania Twain (3:21)
3. "I Do (Cherish You)" – 98° (3:45)
4. "She" – Elvis Costello (3:06)
5. "Ain't No Sunshine" – Bill Withers (2:03)
6. "How Can You Mend a Broken Heart" – Al Green (6:24)
7. "Gimme Some Lovin'" – The Spencer Davis Group (2:57)
8. "When You Say Nothing at All" - Ronan Keating (4:14)
9. "Ain't No Sunshine" – Lighthouse Family (3:41)
10. "From the Heart" - Another Level (4:51)
11. "Everything About You (remix)" - Steve Poltz (3:55)
12. "Will and Anna" – Trevor Jones (Score) (3:35)
13. "Notting Hill" – Trevor Jones (Score) (4:45)

UK/EU version track listing
Catalog #314 546 428-2

1. "From the Heart" - Another Level (4:51)
2. "When You Say Nothing at All" - Ronan Keating (4:14)
3. "She" – Elvis Costello (3:06)
4. "How Can You Mend a Broken Heart" – Al Green (6:24)
5. "In Our Lifetime" –Texas (4:06)
6. "I Do (Cherish You)" – 98° (3:45)
7. "Born to Cry" – Pulp (5:33)
8. "Ain't No Sunshine" – Lighthouse Family (3:41)
9. "You've Got a Way" (Notting Hill remix) – Shania Twain (3:21)
10. "Gimme Some Lovin'" – The Spencer Davis Group (2:57)
11. "Will and Anna" – Trevor Jones (Score) (3:35)
12. "Notting Hill" – Trevor Jones (Score) (4:45)
13. "Ain't No Sunshine" – Bill Withers (2:03)

The film score and original music was recorded and mixed by Gareth Cousins (who also mixed all the songs used in the film) and Simon Rhodes.

== Release ==
The film premiered at the Odeon Leicester Square on 27 April 1999 and opened in the UK on 21 May 1999 and in the United States the following week.

== Reception ==
=== Critical reception ===
Notting Hill received critical approval upon release. On Rotten Tomatoes, the film holds an approval rating of 84% based on 105 reviews, with an average rating of 7.1/10. The website's critical consensus reads: "A rom-com with the right ingredients, Notting Hill proves there's nothing like a love story well told—especially when Hugh Grant and Julia Roberts are your leads." On Metacritic, the film has a weighted average score of 68 out of 100 based on 34 critics, indicating "generally favourable reviews". Audiences polled by CinemaScore gave the film an average grade of "B+" on an A+ to F scale.

Variety's Derek Elley said that "It's slick, it's gawky, it's 10 minutes too long, and it's certainly not "Four Weddings and a Funeral Part 2" in either construction or overall tone", giving it an overall positive review. Cranky Critic called it "Bloody damned good", as well as saying that it was "A perfect date flick." Nitrate said that "Notting Hill is whimsical and light, fresh and quirky", with "endearing moments and memorable characters". In his review of the film's DVD John J. Puccio writes, "The movie is a fairy tale, and writer Richard Curtis knows how much the public loves a fairy tale", calling it "a sweet film". Desson Howe of The Washington Post gave the film a very positive review, particularly praising Rhys Ifans' performance as Spike. James Sanford gave Notting Hill three and a half stars, saying that "Curtis' dialogue may be much snappier than his sometimes dawdling plot, but the first hour of Notting Hill is so beguiling and consistently funny it seems churlish to complain that the rest is merely good." Sue Pierman of the Milwaukee Journal Sentinel stated that "Notting Hill is clever, funny, romantic—and oh, yes, reminiscent of Four Weddings and a Funeral", but that the film "is so satisfying, it doesn't pay to nitpick." Roger Ebert praised the film, saying "The movie is bright, the dialogue has wit and intelligence, and Roberts and Grant are very easy to like." Kenneth Turan gave a good review, concluding that "the film's romantic core is impervious to problems". CNN reviewer Paul Clinton said that Notting Hill "stands alone as another funny and heartwarming story about love against all odds".

Widgett Walls of Needcoffee.com gave the film "three and a half cups of coffee", stating, "The humor of the film saves it from a completely trite and unsatisfying (nay, shall I say enraging) ending", but criticising the soundtrack. Dennis Schwartz gave the film a negative review with a grade of "C−", writing, "This film was pure and unadulterated balderdash". Some criticised the film for giving a "sweetened unrealistic view of London life and British eccentricity". The Independent derided the film as "unrealistic". It was also criticised for failing to reflect the area's demographic: "Only Curtis could write a movie about Notting Hill, London's most diverse borough, and not feature a single black face in it."

=== Lists ===
Notting Hill was 95th on the British Film Institute's "list of the all-time top 100 films", based on estimates of each film's British cinema admissions.

=== Box office ===
The film opened over the Memorial Day weekend in the United States and Canada, the same weekend as Star Wars: Episode I – The Phantom Menace, and opened at #2 for the four-day weekend, grossing US$27.7 million, the biggest opening for a romantic comedy film, beating My Best Friend's Wedding (which also starred Julia Roberts). It made another US$15 million the following week. One month after its release, it lost its record for highest-grossing opening weekend for a romantic comedy film to Runaway Bride (again starring Roberts). Notting Hill grossed £31 million in the United Kingdom (the second highest-grossing film of 1999 behind The Phantom Menace) and US$116,089,678 in the United States and Canada (the 16th highest-grossing film of 1999), with a worldwide gross of US$363,889,678, making it the highest-grossing British film of all time, surpassing the record set by Four Weddings and a Funeral in 1994 (also starring Hugh Grant), and the seventh highest-grossing film of 1999.

=== Awards and nominations ===
Notting Hill won the Audience Award for Most Popular Film at the BAFTAs in 2000, and was nominated in the categories of The Alexander Korda Award for Outstanding British Film of the Year, and Best Performance by an Actor in a Supporting Role for Rhys Ifans. It won Best Comedy Film at the British Comedy Awards. Its soundtrack won Best Soundtrack at the 2000 Brit Awards. It won Best British Film, Best British Director for Roger Michell, and Best British Actor for Hugh Grant at the Empire Awards. It received three nominations at the Golden Globes, in the categories Best Motion Picture – Comedy/Musical, Best Motion Picture Actor – Comedy/Musical for Hugh Grant, and Best Motion Picture Actress – Comedy/Musical for Julia Roberts.

== See also ==
- London in film
- List of films featuring fictional films
