= Self-Portrait Yellow-Pink =

1943 painting by Max Beckmann

Self Portrait Yellow-Pink
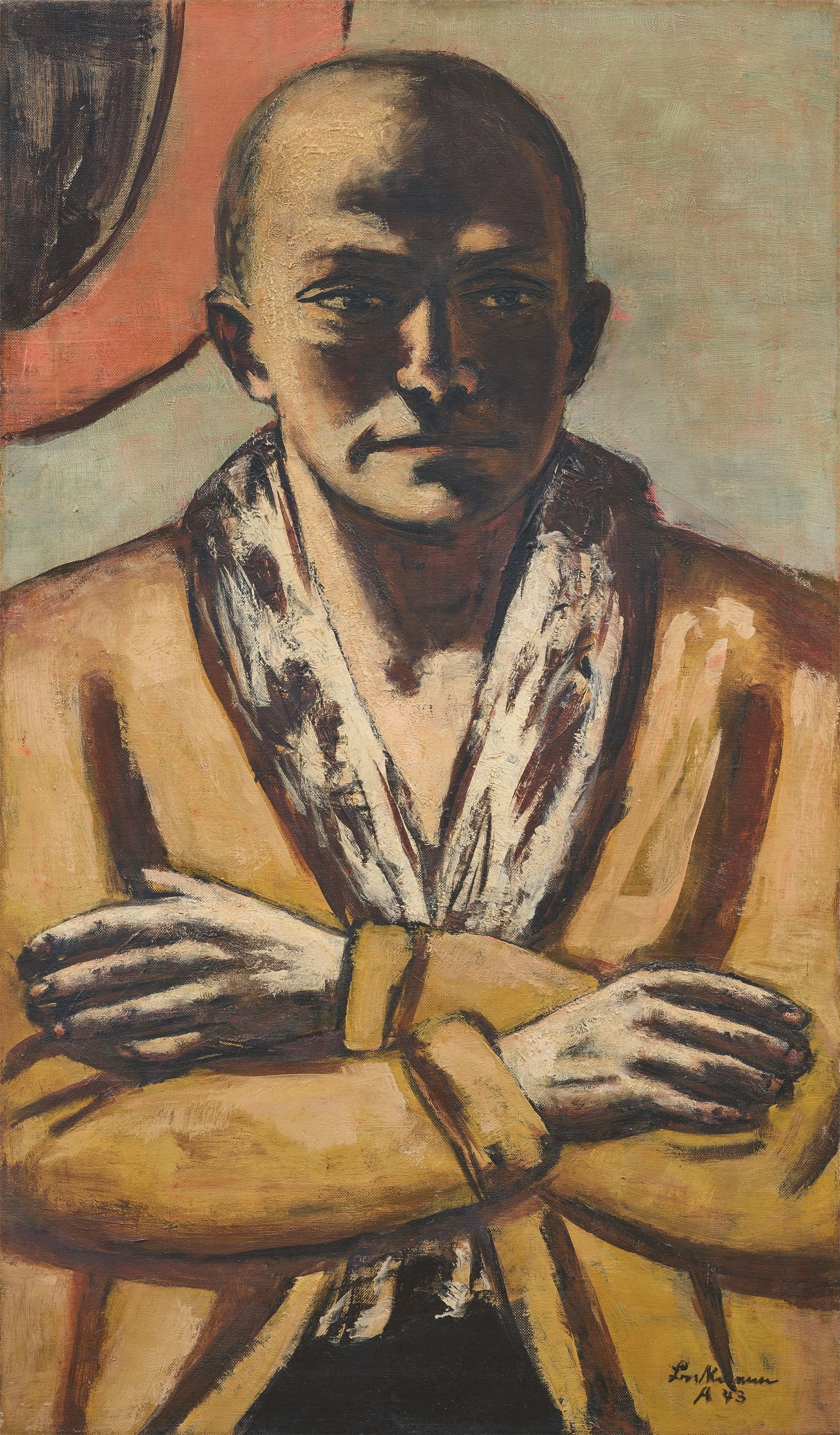
- Artist: Max Beckmann
- Year: 1943
- Medium: oil on canvas
- Dimensions: 94.5 cm × 56 cm (37.2 in × 22 in)
- Location: Private collection

The Self Portrait Yellow-Pink is an oil on canvas painting by the German artist Max Beckmann, from 1943. It was painted while in exile in the Netherlands. In December 2022, it was sold by the auctioneer Grisebach for more than €20 million (US $20.7 million), making it the most expensive painting sold in Germany to date.

== Background ==
Together with his wife Mathilde, Max Beckmann went into exile to the Netherlands in 1937 after his works were identified as Degenerate Art by the Nazi government. The two pretended to be vacationing but really were trying to leave for the United States, which they would accomplish only after World War II, in 1947.

In 1943 Beckmann painted the Self Portrait Yellow-Pink in Amsterdam, while awaiting a visa to the United States. He painted the portrait for his wife Mathilde “Quappi“ von Kaulbach, who assisted him throughout their marriage by keeping track of his catalogue raisonnee.

== Description ==
Beckmann depicted himself standing with crossed arms in front of a mirror in a red frame. The dress he wears is held in yellow and seemingly has fur on it. In contrast to his earlier self-portraits which were painted in dark colors, this one was painted in bright colors.

=== Provenance ===
The self-portrait was presented by Max Beckmann to his wife Mathilde, who kept it until her death in 1986. In 1996 it came into the possession of a Swiss private collector.

== Auction ==
That the portrait was on the market was quite a surprise, and in Germany there was no comparable work of Beckmann on sale since the end of World War II. At the auction its potential price was estimated between 20 and 30 millions euros. The auction house Villa Grisebach in Berlin sold it in December 2022 for €20 millions. It was the highest price for a painting sold in Germany and the second highest price for a painting by Beckmann. It was purchased by Reinhold Würth, a construction entrepreneur of the Würth company. It was welcomed as a good addition to the other Beckmanns in the Würth collection. The portrait was said to be exhibited in the company's art collection and made accessible to the public for free.
