= Milein Cosman =

German-born artist based in England

- Born: Milein Cosman; 31 March 1921; Gotha, Germany
- Died: 21 November 2017 (aged 96); London, United Kingdom
- Education: Slade School of Art
- Known for: Drawing, illustration

Emilie Cosman, known as Milein Cosman, (31 March 1921 – 21 November 2017) was a German-born British artist. She was best known for her graphic work of leading cultural figures, dancers and musicians in action, such as Francis Bacon, Mikhail Baryshnikov, T. S. Eliot, and Igor Stravinsky.

== Biography ==
Cosman was born in Gotha, Germany, in 1921, daughter of Hugo Cosmann (1879–1953). She spent most of her childhood in Düsseldorf. Because of her Jewish background and the rise of National Socialism, she went to school in Switzerland, at the Ecole d'Humanité and the International School of Geneva between 1937 and 1939. She came to England in 1939.

Between 1939 and 1942, Cosman studied at the Slade School of Art. The Slade had relocated to Oxford from London during the war years. There Cosman studied drawing under Randolph Schwabe and lithography under Harold Jones. In 1943, she attended evening classes at Oxford Polytechnic, where she was taught by Bernard Meninsky. In the same year, she started teaching French and Art at a convent school as well as giving lectures on Art for the Workers' Educational Association (WEA).

In 1946, Cosman moved to London. She began book illustration and working as a freelance artist, while continuing to teach evening classes for the WEA and working for the American Broadcasting Station in Europe. She contributed drawings to national and international magazines and newspapers, including the BBC's Radio Times. Particularly noteworthy is a commission from Heute magazine to draw Konrad Adenauer's post-war cabinet in Germany 1949. These drawings were acquired by the German Government Art Collection in 2019 and their first public exhibition as a collection was opened at the German Bundestag in Berlin in April 2022.

In 1947, Cosman met the Viennese-born musician, writer, broadcaster and teacher Hans Keller (1919–1985), whom she married in 1961. Some books of his writings – The Jerusalem Diary (2001), Stravinsky The Music Maker (2010) and Britten (2013), for example – include many of her drawings and prints. Hans and Milein lived in Hampstead, where their friends included the artist Marie-Louise von Motesiczky.

Milein Cosman made a series of schools programmes on drawing for ITV in 1958. In all, she had nearly 30 solo exhibitions in the UK and abroad and her work has been acquired by many leading museums including the British Museum, the Victoria and Albert Museum, the National Portrait Gallery, the Ashmolean Museum in Oxford, the Fitzwilliam Museum in Cambridge, the Hunterian Museum in Glasgow, the Palais des Beaux-Arts in Brussels and the Kupferstichkabinett in Berlin. She was renowned for drawing quickly, and much of her work was done from the wings or auditorium during rehearsals for concerts, theatrical and dance performances, capturing movement “in mid-flight” as Ernst Gombrich put it.

In 2006, Cosman founded the Cosman Keller Art and Music Trust, which aims to support young musicians and artists as well as publishing, exhibiting and archiving her own and Hans Keller’s work. In 2014, a documentary film about Milein Cosman, directed by Christoph Böll, premiered in Düsseldorf in her presence.

Cosman died in November 2017. She bequeathed a set of over 1300 drawings to the Royal College of Music, London. Before her death Cosman gave drawings, sketchbooks, etchings and oil paintings, The Milein Cosman Dancers Collection, to the Department of Music and Dance Studies at the University of Salzburg. A biography and comprehensive overview of Cosman's art by art historian Ines Schlenker was released in 2019.

Tate Archive holds the Milein Cosman Archive of more than 10,000 items, including most of her sketchbooks and thousands of drawings and prints, along with her personal and professional papers, diaries and photographs. A selection of these have been digitised.

== Books produced or illustrated by Cosman ==
- Hans Keller and Donald Mitchell (eds) (with drawings by Cosman): Benjamin Britten: A Commentary on his Work from a Group of Specialists (London, Rockliff, 1952)
- Musical Sketchbook (Bruno Cassirer, Oxford, 1957)
- Neville Cardus (with drawings by Cosman): Composer's Eleven (London, 1958; ISBN 0-8369-1554-2)
- (with Hans Keller): Stravinsky at Rehearsal (1962; published in Germany as Stravinsky Dirigiert)
- (with Hans Keller): 1975 (1984 minus 9) (London, 1977)
- (with Hans Keller): Stravinsky Seen and Heard (Toccata Press, 1982; ISBN 0-907689-02-7). Reissued as Stravinsky The Music Maker (ed. M. Anderson, Toccata Press, 2010)
- (With Hans Keller): The Jerusalem Diary - Music, Society and Politics, 1977 and 1979 (ed. C. Wintle & F. Williams, Plumbago Books, 2001, ISBN 0-9540123-0-5)
- Lebenslinien/Lifelines (ed. Thomas B Schumann and Julian Hogg, Edition Memoria, Cologne, 2012, ISBN 978-3-930353-32-3)
- (with Hans Keller): Britten London, Plumbago Books and Arts, 2013, ISBN 978-0-9566007-4-5 (hardback), 978-0-95660075-2 (softback)
- Milein Cosman: Capturing Time (Ines Schlenker, Prestel, Munich, 2019, ISBN 978-3-7913-5797-3 (hardback))

== Solo exhibitions ==
1949: Berkeley Gardens, London

1957: Matthiessen Gallery, London

1968: City of London Festival

1969: Camden Arts Festival

1970: Theatre des Champs-Élysées (Festival International de Danse, British Council), Paris

1974: Ryder Gallery, Los Angeles

1984: Yehudi Menuhin School, Surrey

1984: Dartington Hall, Devon

1988: Stadtmuseum, Düsseldorf

1990: Clare Hall, University of Cambridge

1996: Belgrave Gallery, London

2007: Palais des Beaux Arts, Brussels

2008: Austrian Cultural Forum, London

2014: Hunterian Museum, Glasgow

2014: Kunstforum, Gotha

2015: Rathaus, Düsseldorf

2019: Clare Hall, University of Cambridge

2021: Stadtmuseum, Düsseldorf (centenary exhibition of works by Ilde Schrader and Milein Cosman, who were childhood friends)

2021: Hampstead School of Art, London

2022: Bundestag, Berlin (a joint exhibition including works from the art collection of the Akademie der Künste)

2022: Palais des Beaux Arts (Bozar), Brussels (permanent exhibition of drawings of musicians by Milein Cosman)

2022: Haus Hövener, Brilon (exhibition of works by Milein Cosman and Ilde Schrader)

2024: Stadtmuseum Bonn

2026: Hampstead School of Art, London
