= Andrew Unangst =

American photographer

Andrew Unangst (born 1950) is an American art, commercial, and fashion photographer, as well as a music video director.

== Biography ==
Unangst is perhaps best known for his photograph of Andy Warhol with an actual can of Campbell's soup a reference to the to artist appropriation of Campbell's Soup Cans in his famous pop art paintings of them, as well as several other widely seen pictures of the platinum haired art legend. One of the photos also graced the cover of ArtNews. Most recently the Brazilian painter and muralist Eduardo Kobra employed one of Unangst'a Warhol photos as source material for a mural he executed in the Chelsea section of Manhattan which has subsequently led to a collaboration between the two artists.

Unangst has done several covers for Time Magazine including the one on March 26, 1984 in which he visually illustrated the storyline "Cholesterol And Now The Bad News' and "Cocktails 85" on May 20, 1985.

Unangst took the author's photo for the book jacket for Stephen King's 1985 novel "Christine".

As a music video director he helmed the production for the English rock singer John Parr's song "Love Grammar".
