= Falling Man (Beckmann) =

1950 painting by Max Beckmann

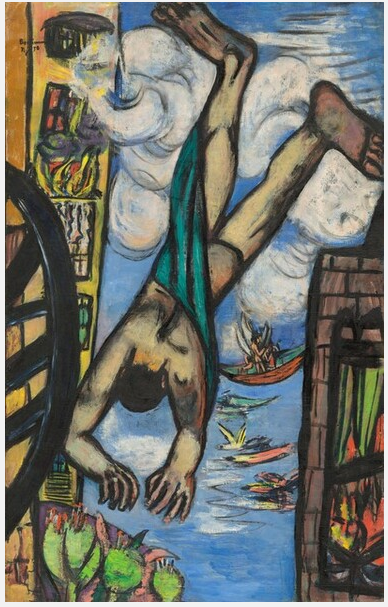
- Artist: Max Beckmann
- Year: 1950
- Medium: Oil on canvas
- Dimensions: 141 cm × 88.9 cm (56 in × 35.0 in)
- Location: National Gallery of Art; Washington D.C.

Falling Man is an oil-on-canvas painting by the German artist Max Beckmann, from 1950. The work was created in New York during the final year of his life when he was living in the United States, since he had left the Netherlands in 1947. The painting is in the National Gallery of Art, in Washington D.C.

== History and description ==
The work is considered eerily predictive of the jumpers and other doomed people falling from the World Trade Center Towers during the September 11 attacks in New York City, on a similar setting to the painting, clear blue day.

Falling Man is said to be preceded in Beckmann's opus by some of the drawings he did for his 1943–44 illustration of Goethe's Faust II which contains multiple images of falling men.

The painting was included in the 2016–17 exhibition of the artist's work Max Beckmann in New York at the Metropolitan Museum of Art.
