= Duncan Kenworthy =

British film and television producer (born 1949)

Duncan Kenworthy OBE
- Born: Duncan Hamish Kenworthy; September 1949 (age 76–77); Saddleworth England
- Education: Christ's College, Cambridge
- Occupations: film producer, television producer, production company co-founder

Duncan Hamish Kenworthy OBE (born September 1949) is a British film and television producer, and co-founder of the production company DNA Films. He is currently a producer at Toledo Productions.

== Early life ==
Kenworthy was educated at Rydal Mount School, Colwyn Bay, North Wales, which is now Rydal Penrhos School, an independent international boarding school. The school renovated the sixth form social space in 2018 and, after a generous donation from Kenworthy during the campaign to all alumni for support, it named the study room in his honour, as The Kenworthy Study Room.

He later attended Christ's College, Cambridge, a constituent college of the University of Cambridge, from 1968, graduating in 1971 with a first class degree in English. He then studied as a postgraduate in the United States at the Annenberg School for Communication at the University of Pennsylvania.

== Career ==
After finishing his education in the US, he remained there, working with Jim Henson. On returning to the UK, he became an independent producer, with credits including Four Weddings and a Funeral (1994), Lawn Dogs (1997), Notting Hill (1999), Love Actually (2003) and The Eagle (2011). His television productions include Jim Henson's The Storyteller and the 1996 version of Gulliver's Travels. He was also co-creator, producer and creative consultant of Fraggle Rock. He appeared in photographs in the credits of Four Weddings and a Funeral (although uncredited) as "Matthew's Gorgeous New Boyfriend". He is currently the Vice President of BAFTA, having previously held the position of chairman (2004–06).

== Selected filmography ==
- 1994: Four Weddings and a Funeral
- 1997: Lawn Dogs
- 1999: Notting Hill
- 2001: The Parole Officer
- 2003: Love Actually
- 2011: The Eagle
- 2016: The Pass
- 2018: The Children Act

== Awards ==
In February 2015, the National Film and Television School's Board of Governors bestowed an Honorary Fellowship on Kenworthy.

On 23 October 2026, Kenworthy will be awarded a BAFTA Fellowship during a special presentation. British academy said, "He will be honoured for his extraordinary contribution to film, championing British talent and storytelling through a distinguished body of work that has resonated with audiences worldwide, as well as his enduring commitment to inspiring and supporting the next generation of screen talent."
