= Al-Lail =

92nd chapter of the Qur'an

Surah 92 of the Quran
الليل Al-Lail The Night
- Qira'ah; English text
- Classification: Meccan
- Position: Juzʼ 30
- No. of verses: 21
- No. of words: 71
- No. of letters: 314

Al-Lail
Recitation of Al-Lail in mujawwad.

Sūrat al-Layl (Arabic: الليل, "The Night") is the ninety-second sūrah (chapter) of the Qur'an, containing twenty-one āyāt (verses). This sūrah is one of the first ten to be revealed in Mecca. It contrasts two types of people, the charitable and the miserly, and describes each of their characteristics.

== Summary ==
- 1-4 Oaths by various natural objects
- 5-13 The obedient blessed and the covetous accursed
- 14-16 The covetous warned with hell-fire
- 17-21 True believers shall be rewarded hereafter

== Date of the revelations ==
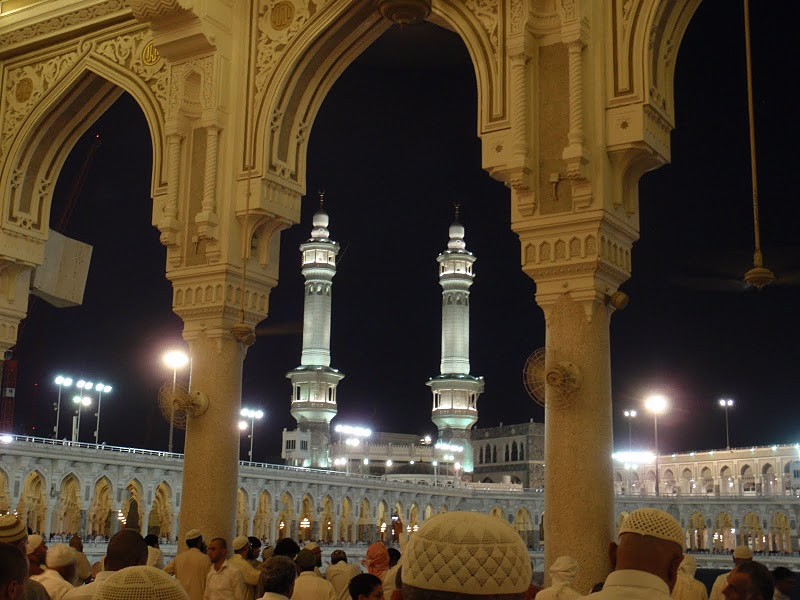
Masjid al-Haram, Mecca at night

Sūrah Al-Lail is a Meccan sura, and was among the first ten surahs to be revealed. Meccan surahs are chronologically earlier surahs that were revealed to Muhammad at Mecca before the hijrah to Medina in 622 CE. They are typically shorter, with relatively short ayat, and mostly come near the end of the Qur'an's 114 sūwar. Most of the surahs containing muqatta'at are Meccan. According to Yusuf Ali, Al-Lail may be placed in the dating period close to Surat Al-Fajr and Ad-Dhuha (93). It is similar in subject matter to the chapter preceding it, Ash-Shams (91).

== Theme and subject matter ==
The mufassirūn (Quranic commentators) note a similarity that in all of the aforementioned three suras the wonder and contrast between night and day are appealed to for the consolation of man in his spiritual yearning. According to an interpretation expounded on in the tafsīr (commentary) written by Sayyid Abul Ala Maududi (d. 1979) entitled Tafhim al-Qur'an, the primary theme of Surat al-Lail is distinguishing between two different ways of life and explaining the contrast between their ultimate ends and results. Sayyid Qutb (d. 1966), who was an Egyptian author, Islamist, and leading intellectual of the Egyptian Muslim Brotherhood, surmised the overall theme of Surat Al-Lail in the introduction to his extensive Quranic commentary, Fi Zilal al-Qur'an (In the shades of the Qur'an) by saying:

Within a framework of scenes taken from the universe and the realm of human nature, this surah states emphatically the basic facts of action and reward. This issue had diverse aspects... The end in the hereafter is also varied, according to the type of action and the direction taken in this life... The subject matter of the surah, i.e., action and reward, is by nature double directional, so the framework chosen for it at the beginning of the surah is of dual coloring. It is based on contrasting aspects in the creation of man and the universe.

—Sayid Qutb, Fi Zilal al-Qur'an

According to an account from the book A Comprehensive Commentary on the Quran, translated by George Sale, Jalal ad-Din as-Suyūti – co-author of the classical Sunni tafsīr known as Tafsir al-Jalalayn - had speculated that this whole description belongs peculiarly to Abu Bakr; for when he had purchased Bilal ibn Rabah, the Ethiopian (afterwards Muhammad's muadhdhin, or crier to prayers), who had been put to the rack on account of his faith, the infidels said he did it only out of a view of interest; upon which this passage was revealed. However, the style and language of this chapter are against this explanation. It is best, therefore, to regard the whole as addressed to Muhammad's hearers generally.

In his book The Corân, William Muir classifies Al-Lail in a Quranic sub-category known as the Soliloquies - a literary form of discourse in which Muhammad talks to himself or reveals his thoughts without addressing a listener. However, Sale argues that this sūrah seems to be ruled out of that category by the statements of āyāt 14 where Muhammad appears as a warner, and therefore is entered upon his public ministry. Regarding subject matter, Sayyid Maududi suggests this surah can generally be divided into two parts, the first consisting of āyāt 1 through 11, and the second of āyāt 12 through 21.

=== Q92:1–11 By night and Day ===
By the night as it envelops; By the day as it appears; By Him Who created male and female; Certainly, your efforts and deeds are diverse; As for him who gives and has taqwa; and believes in al-husnā; We will make smooth for him the path of ease; But he who is greedy and thinks himself self-sufficient; and denies al-husnā; We will make smooth for him the path to evil; and what will his wealth avail him when he goes down (in destruction)

— Quran 92:1-11 ^{-Yusuf Ali}

Allah begins this chapter by swearing a series of oaths: by the night when it envelops the world, by the day when it illuminates and, finally by Himself who has created the male and female (92:1-3). Evidence of these three things are invoked (night, day and gender) to illustrate how the aims and activities engaged in by both individuals and nations, are, in respect to their moral nature, widely divergent. Verse 92:3 literally means, "Consider that which has created [or "creates"] the male and the female", i.e., the elements which are responsible for the differentiation between male and female. This, together with the symbolism of night and day, darkness and light, is an allusion - similar to the first ten verses of the preceding surah (Ash-Shams) - to the polarity evident in all nature and, hence, to the dichotomy (spoken of in the next verse) which characterizes man's aims and motives. Following a style common to the brief chapters, three opposing moral characteristics are presented as illustrations, providing a means from which mankind may judge which of the two lifestyles is being represented.

92:1 وَالَّيْلِ إِذَا يَغْشَى

Wa-(a)l-laili 'idhā yaghshā
By the night as it envelops

92:2 وَالنَّهَارِ إِذَا تَجَلَّى

Wa-(a)n-nahāri 'idhā tajallā
By the day as it appears

92:3 وَمَا خَلَقَ الذَّكَرَ وَالْأُنثَى

Wa mā khalaqa-(a)dh-dhakara wa-(a)l-‘unthā
And (by)he who created the male and female

Traits characterizing the first type of individuals are distinguished here by three signs: (1) sacrificing their wealth: (2) adopting taqwa (God-consciousness): and (3) recognizing and supporting all that is morally correct (wa şaddaqa bi-(a)l-ĥusnā). The second character type – described in verses 8 through 10 - are also distinguished by three signs: they are miserly and do not give of their wealth; they are arrogant and think themselves independent of Allah's Will (92:8); and (3) knowingly dishonoring Truth out of spite, or seeing ugliness where there is beauty. Then, it is stated that these two modes of action, which are clearly divergent, cannot be equal and alike in respect to results, i.e., just as they are divergent in their nature, so they are divergent in their results.

Narrated ’Alī ibn Abī Ṭālib: We were in the company of the Prophet in a funeral procession at Baqi Al-Gharqad. He said, "There is none of you but has his place written for him in Paradise or in the Hell-Fire." They said, "O Allah's Apostle! Shall we depend (on this fact and give up work)?" He said, "Carry on doing (good deeds), for every body will find it easy to do (what will lead him to his destined place)." Then he recited: 'As for him who gives (in charity) and keeps his duty to Allah, and believes in the Best reward from Allah (i.e. Allah will compensate him for what he will spend in Allah's way). So, We will make smooth for him the path of ease. But he who is a greedy miser... for him, the path for evil.' (92.5-10)

In verse 7, humans are told if they strive their utmost towards Allah, that He will provide every help and satisfaction to a “state of ease” (li-l-yusrā). People adopting the first mode of action are promised by Allāh that He will make correct behavior easy for them, to such an extent that doing good becomes easy and doing evil difficult. On the contrary, those adopting the second mode of life, Allāh will make their path difficult in this world and in the Hereafter. Consequently, performing evil actions will become easy, while doing good becomes increasingly difficult. Ibn Kathir further extrapolated on this concept:

And there are many Ayat with this meaning, proving that Allah rewards those who intend good with success, while whoever intends evil is abandoned, and all of this is in accordance with a preordained decree. There are also many Hadiths that prove this. Imam Ahmad recorded from Abu Bakr that he said to the Messenger of Allah, "O Messenger of Allah! Do we act according to what has already been decided, or is the matter just beginning (i.e., still undecided)" He replied, "Indeed it is according to what has already been decided". Then Abu Bakr said, "Then what (good) are deeds, O Messenger of Allah" He replied, "Everyone will find it easy to do such deeds that will lead him to what he was created for".

—Ibn Kathir, Tafsir Ibn Kathir 92:7

Thus, the first part of the surah ends having made clear that there are only two ways for all mankind in all times and places. All humanity is in two parties under two headings however numerous are their colors and forms.

=== Q92:12–21 Three truths stated ===
Truly, on Us is (to give) guidance; and truly, unto Us (belong) the last (Hereafter) and the first (this world); Therefore I have warned you of a fire; None shall enter it save the most wretched; Who denies and turns away; and those with taqwa will be far removed from it; He who gives of his wealth for self-purification; and who has (in mind) no favor from anyone to be paid back; Except to seek the Face of his Lord, the Most High; He, surely, will be pleased.

— Quran 92:12-21 ^{-Yusuf Ali}

In the next part of this sūrah, another three truths are stated. First, verse 12 says that Allāh has not left man uninformed in the world, but has assumed responsibility for clearly showing humanity the halal (lawful) and haram (unlawful). Another interpretation given to verse 12 is that – ‘Whoever takes the path of guidance will reach Us.’

92:12 إِنَّ عَلَيْنَا لَلْهُدَى

Inna ‘alainā la-(a)l-hudā
Lo! Ours it is (to give) the guidance

Regarding this same verse, Qatada ibn al-Nu'man said - Truly, on Us is (to give) guidance - 'This means, We will explain what is lawful and what is prohibited.' Others have said that it means, "Whoever traverses upon the path of guidance, then he will reach Allah (i.e., in the Hereafter). They consider this ayat like Allah's saying: "And upon Allah is the responsibility to explain the Straight path." This has been mentioned by Ibn Jarir.

92:13 وَإِنَّ لَنَا لَلْآخِرَةَ وَالْأُولَى

Wa ‘inna lanā la-l-‘ākhirata wa-l-‘ūlā
And truly, unto Us (belong) the last (Hereafter) and the first (this world)

Second, verse 13 contends that Allāh alone is the master of both this world and the Hereafter. If an individual seeks worldly goods, only Allāh controls whether or not it will be received. Likewise, for those seeking the Hereafter, once again it is Allāh who will provide. Now, it is up to the individual to decide what should be sought. The third truth is that the wretched ones (‘illa-l-‘ashqā) who rejected the truth when Muhammad invited them to Islam, have a blazing fire awaiting them (nāran talaźźa, or “a flaming fire”). The term used for them in verse 15 is ‘ashqā (superlative degree). Ibn Kathir includes a hadith related to this type of person: Ahmad ibn Hanbal reported Muhammad as saying “Only wretched people will go to Hell.” When asked, “Who is the wretched,” he said, “One who disobeys and does not refrain from evil out of fear of Allah.”

Imam Ahmad recorded from Abu Hurayrah that Muhammad said: “All of my followers will enter Paradise on the Day of Judgement except for whoever refuses.” They (the Companions) said, “Who would refuse, O Messenger of Allah,” He replied, “Whoever obeys me, he will enter Paradise, and whoever disobeys me, then he has refused.”

92:18 الَّذِى يُؤْتِى مَالَهُ يَتَزَكَّى

Alladhī yu’tī māla-hū yatazakkā
Those who spend their wealth for increase in self-purification

The spending may be for charity, or for good works, such as advancing the cause of knowledge or science, or supporting ideals. “Wealth” (māl) must be understood not only for money or material goods, but also any advantage or opportunity which a man happens to enjoy, and which he can place at the service of others. The Arabic root word zakā implies both increase and purification, and both meanings may be understood to be implied here. The word tazkiyah is the transitive verbal noun (masdar) of zakā. Islahi defines it as, purification of something from adulterants, its growth and development to bring it to the height of its perfection. The word zakāt (the obligatory alms) also comes from this same root. Al-Asfahāni states that it is called zakāt because the person who gives it hopes for blessings or he hopes to purify his soul or for both of these aspects. Yusuf Ali adds that wealth (understood both literally and metaphorically) is not for selfish enjoyment or idle show. It is held on trust and may be a trial in itself.

The root sidq has several derivatives. The verb saddaqa with respect to statements means to accept and realize. The verb tasaddaqa with respect to funds means gave away, realizing his faith by action. And the verb asdaqa means to give dowry in marriage to women. The meaning of sadaqah is derived from the root sidq because sadaqah implies giving away goods and funds for the sake of Allah in expression of faithfulness and in realization of the belief in resurrection and afterlife. It is for that reason that Qur'an associated giving with affirmation of faith and withholding with rejection of faith; Allah says; “So he who gives in charity and fears Allah and in all sincerity testifies to the best, we will indeed make smooth for him the path to bliss, but who is a greedy miser and thinks himself self-sufficient and gives lies to the best we will indeed make smooth for him the path to misery.” Sadaqah is thus an indication of truthfullness in faith and sincere belief in the day of Judgement. Accordingly, the Messenger of Allah said sadaqah is a proof (or evidence). (Reported by Muslim)

92:20 إِلاَّ ابْتِغَآءَ وَجْهِ رَبِّهِ الاٌّعْلَى

Illa-btighā’a wajhi Rabbi-hi-l-‘A’lā
But only the desire to seek for the Countenance of their Lord, Most High

92:21 وَلَسَوْفَ يَرْضَى

Wa-la-sawfa yarđā
He verily will be content

As for the God-fearing person who spends their wealth in a good cause “for increase in self-purification”, without any selfish motive, only desiring the “Face of their Lord Most High”, Allah will be pleased with him and he will be satisfied (wa-la-sawfa yarđā). This “Face” or “Countenance” (wajh) implies good pleasure or approval; but it also implies something more. It also means the Cause, - either the “final cause” or the “efficient cause” of Aristotelian philosophy. For the atqā (righteous one with taqwa) would refer everything backwards in origin and forwards in destiny, to Allah. Allah is the source of their goodness, as well as its goal or purpose.

== Asbāb al-nuzūl ==
Asbāb al-nuzūl ( or circumstances of revelation) is a secondary genre of Qur'anic exegesis (tafsir) directed at establishing the context in which specific verses of the Qur'an were revealed. Though of some use in reconstructing the Qur'an's historicity, asbāb is by nature an exegetical rather than a historiographical genre, and as such usually associates the verses it explicates with general situations rather than specific events. Most of the mufassirūn say that verses 17 through 21 were revealed about Abu Bakr Siddiq (r. 632-34). Some claim a consensus on this, although the statements are general. Ibn Kathir states that Abu Bakr had a special status among the Sahaba (companions of Muhammad). He helped all the people who sought his help and he was well known for this. On the eve of the Treaty of Hudaybiyyah (628 CE), when Abu Bakr showed his anger and chastised Urwa bin Masud, chief of the Thaqif tribe. Urwa told him, "Had I not been under an obligation to you, I would have answered you of the same king.”

== Special traits of Surat Al-Lail ==
Many ahadith have been related concerning the spiritual benefits associated with Surat Al-Lail. Muhammad is reported to have said that the reward of reciting this surah is so much that the one who recites it will be pleased when he sees it in his Book of Deeds. His inspiration of good deeds (tawfiq) will also increase. If recited 15 times before sleeping, one will dream about what pleases him most. Reciting it in the I’sha salāt, carries the reward of completing a quarter of the Qur'an and is guaranteed that the prayers are accepted. The sixth Shia Imām, Ja’far as-Sādiq (d. 748) has said that the person who recites Sūrah Ash-Shams, Al-Lail, Ad-Dhuha and Al-Inshirah will, on the Day of Judgement, find all creatures of the earth testifying on his behalf and Allah will accept their testimony and give him a place in Jannah (Paradise). Recitation of this sūrah also leads to an increase in sustenance, courage and popularity amongst the people.

== Surat Al-Lail and the Imamate ==
The Shiite perspective on certain verses in Surat Al-Lail is mentioned in the book, Imamate and Leadership by Mujtaba Musavi Lari. According to Shiite Muslims, the task of the Imam is guiding men and demonstrating to them the path that will lead them to happiness. That being the case, the only right path for selecting the Imam is the same as that which the Qur'an spells out for the prophets: “It is indeed incumbent on Us to guide mankind, for the kingdom of this world and the hereafter is Ours.” (92:11-12) Thus, just as Muhammad is appointed from Allāh, the Qur'anic verses point to the fact that appointment of the Imām also is from Allāh as the Imām's appointment is primarily concerned with the covenant of Allāh as well as with the function of guiding people to the right path.

In this context Abū ‘Alī al-Ḥusayn ibn ‘Abd Allāh ibn Sīnā (d. 1037) says:

The Imām should be infallible and highly virtuous. Since it is not possible for an ordinary person to know such spiritual and intellectual characteristics in man and even if he knows something of it, he knows it in a defective way or through the aid of signs. Thus it is evident that the appointment of the Imām should come from Allāh as He alone knows all the secrets of human beings and the unseen matters as well as things which are of good value to us.

— Abu Ali Sina
