= Nite =

Nite may refer to:

- Jon Nite
- Night
- National Institute of Technology and Evaluation (NITE)
