= Figure and the City =

1950 oil on canvas painting

Figure and the City is a seminal 1950 oil on canvas painting by the American visual artist Joan Mitchell.

Chronologically it is the final work by Mitchell in which a representation of a human figure is included. Mitchell herself later said of the work "I knew that it would be my last figure".

The painting was included in the 2021-2022 retrospective of her oeuvre held at the San Francisco Museum of Modern Art and then the Baltimore Museum of Art in Baltimore, Maryland. SF MoMa curator Sarah Roberts said of the canvas's importance to the exhibition that it was 'a touchstone for us".. and that .."it was very much about the psychology and the mood of the figure, and the landscape around her". [Mitchell].

The work is part of the collection of the Joan Mitchell Foundation.
