= Night After Night =

Night After Night may refer to:

- Night After Night (film), a 1932 film starring George Raft and Constance Cummings, with Mae West
- Night After Night (Nils Lofgren album), a 1977 album by Nils Lofgren
- Night After Night (U.K. album), a 1979 album by the British band UK
- Night After Night (George Duke album)
- Night After Night with Allan Havey, a talk show starring Allan Havey
- "Night After Night", a 2015 song by Sandra Lyng
- "Night After Night (Out of the Shadows)", a song by The Rasmus from their album Hide from the Sun
- Night After Night (TV series), a South Korean television talk show
- Night After Night (2008 TV series), a 2008 South Korean television drama series
