= Mujtaba Musavi Lari =

Shi'a Twelver Islamic scholar (1925–2013)

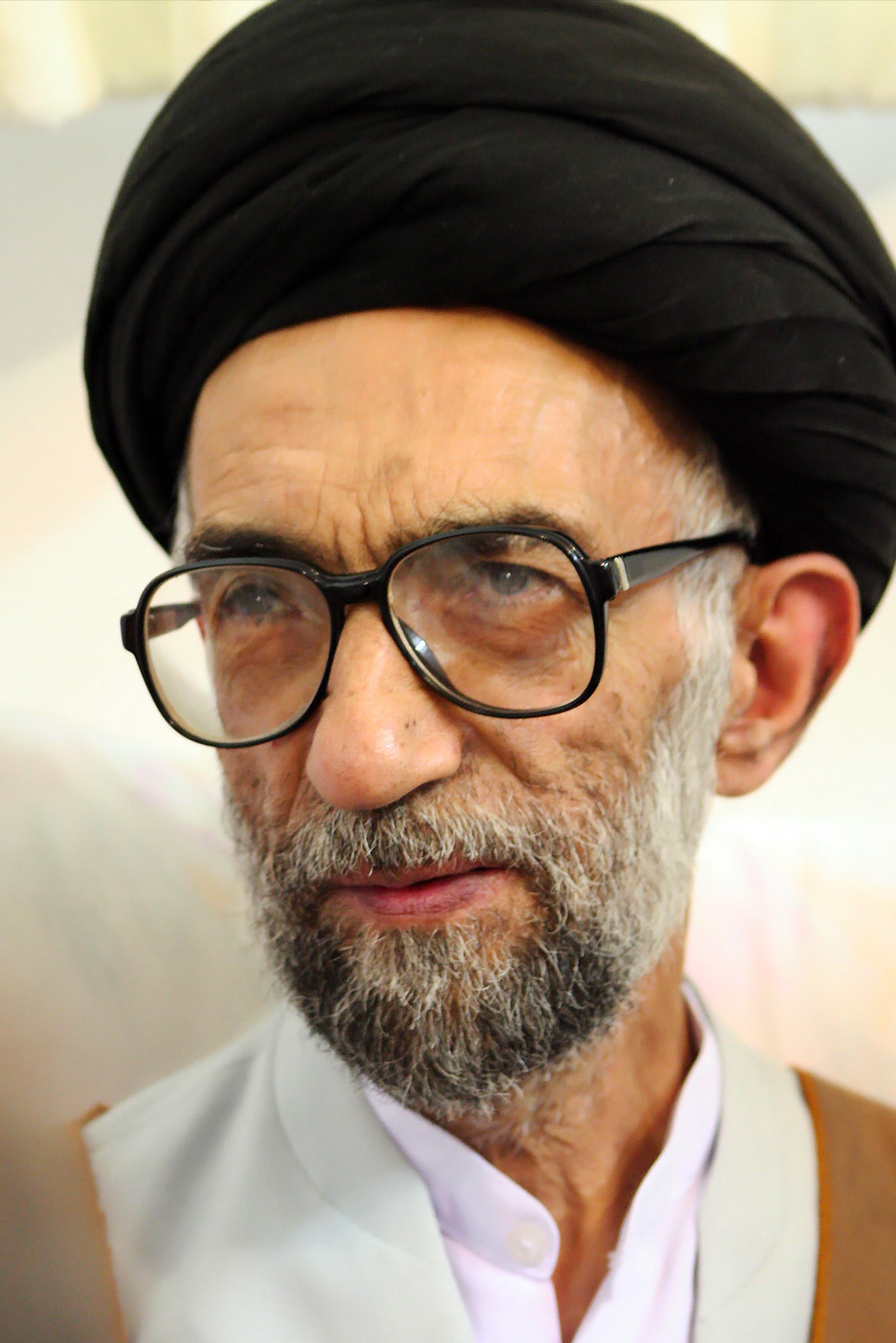
- Born: 1925; Lar, Iran
- Died: 9 March 2013 (aged 87–88); Iran

Philosophical work
- School: Shi'a Twelver

Mujtaba Musavi Lari (1925 – 9 March 2013) was a Shi'a Twelver Islamic scholar.

== Biography ==
Lari was born in Lar, Iran, to the late Ayatulla Sayyid Ali Asghar Lari. After completing his preliminary studies in Lar in 1953 he continued his Islamic studies in Qom. In 1963, he received medical treatment in Germany, and later wrote Western Civilization Through Muslim Eyes, which was reprinted in several languages.

In 1964 Lari founded a charity in Lar for helping the poor and spreading Islam among youth in rural areas. Members of the charity traveled across Iran, teaching Islam and donating clothes, books and writing tools. The charity also built mosques, schools and clinics in small towns and villages.

== Works ==
- Ethics and Spiritual Growth
- God and His Attributes: Lessons on Islamic Doctrine
- Imamate and Leadership: Lessons on Islamic Doctrine (1996), English translation by Hamid Algar
- Resurrection Judgement and the Hereafter: Lessons on Islamic Doctrine
- Seal of the Prophets and His Message: Lessons on Islamic Doctrine
- Hidden Truths in God's Word
- Youth and Morals
- Western Civilization through Muslim Eyes

== See also ==
- List of Islamic scholars
