= The Night (Beckmann) =

Painting by Max Beckmann

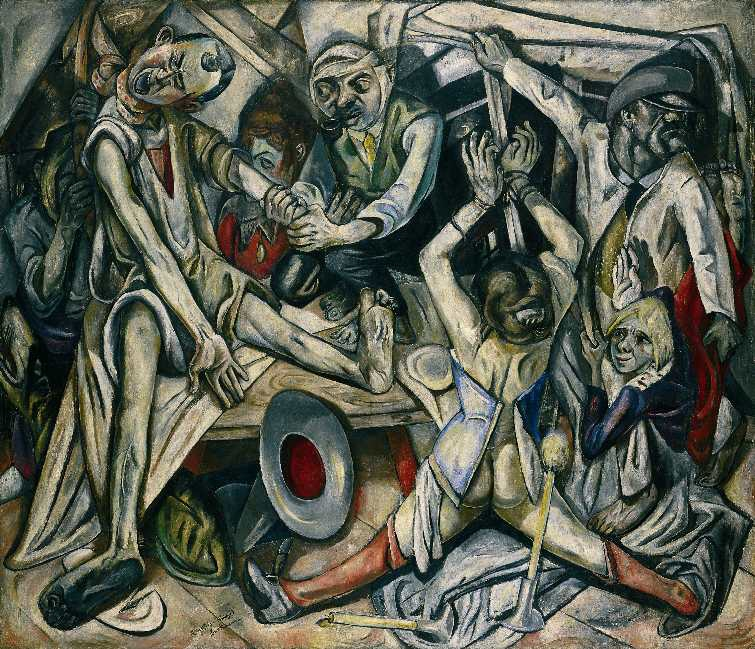
- Artist: Max Beckmann
- Year: 1918–1919
- Medium: Oil on canvas
- Dimensions: 133 cm × 153 cm (52 3/8 in × 60 1/4 in)
- Location: Kunstsammlung Nordrhein-Westfalen; Düsseldorf

The Night (German: Die Nacht) is an oil-on-canvas painting by the German artist Max Beckmann, created between 1918 and 1919. It is an icon of the post-World War I movement Neue Sachlichkeit, or New Objectivity. It is located at the Kunstsammlung Nordrhein-Westfalen, Düsseldorf.

== Interpretation ==
Three men appear to invade a small, cramped room, where they terrorize the scene. To the left, a man is hanged by one of the intruders, and his arm twisted by another. A woman, seemingly the man's wife, is bound to one of the room's supports after having been raped. To the right, the child is about to be taken away by one of the intruders—note the feet near the top right hand corner. Beckmann used himself as model for the man in the noose. He also modeled the woman and child after his own wife and son.

== Techniques ==
The subject matter is chaotic, amplified by the artist's use of color and form. The figures are distorted and given a "poisonously cold, green-tinged coloration". The composition is flat and stilted, with no implementations of depth. For instance, though the woman appears at the forefront of the piece, she is bound to the room's back entrance. The sporadic interruptions of vibrant red and the painting's intrusive angularity serve to shock the viewer, and animate the scene with chaos and energy.

== Association with Neue Sachlichkeit (New Objectivity) ==
Max Beckmann enlisted in the German army during World War I. Initially, like many Neue Sachlichkeit and Futurist artists, Beckmann believed war could cleanse the individual and society. After experiencing the widespread destruction and horror of the war, however, he became disillusioned with war and rejected the supposed glory of military service. The Night's illogical composition relays post-war disillusionment and the artist's confusion over the "society he saw descending into madness" (Kleiner et al.). Although The Night does not directly depict a specific battle or war scene, the image is considered one of the most poignant and seminal pieces of post-war art.

Author Stephan Lackner writes:

But Beckmann sees no purpose in the suffering he shows; there is no glory for anybody, no compensation, (...) Beckmann blames human nature as such, and there seems to be no physical escape from this overwhelming self-accusation. Victims and aggressors alike are cornered. There is no exit.

== Bibliography ==
- Kleiner, Fred, S. Mamiya, Christin J. Gardner's Art Through the Ages. 12th Edition. Wadsworth, a division of Thomas Learning, Inc. 2005.
- Lackner, Stephan. Max Beckmann (Master of the Art Series). Harry N Abrams; New Ed edition (April 1991)
