= Minna Beckmann-Tube =

German painter and opera singer

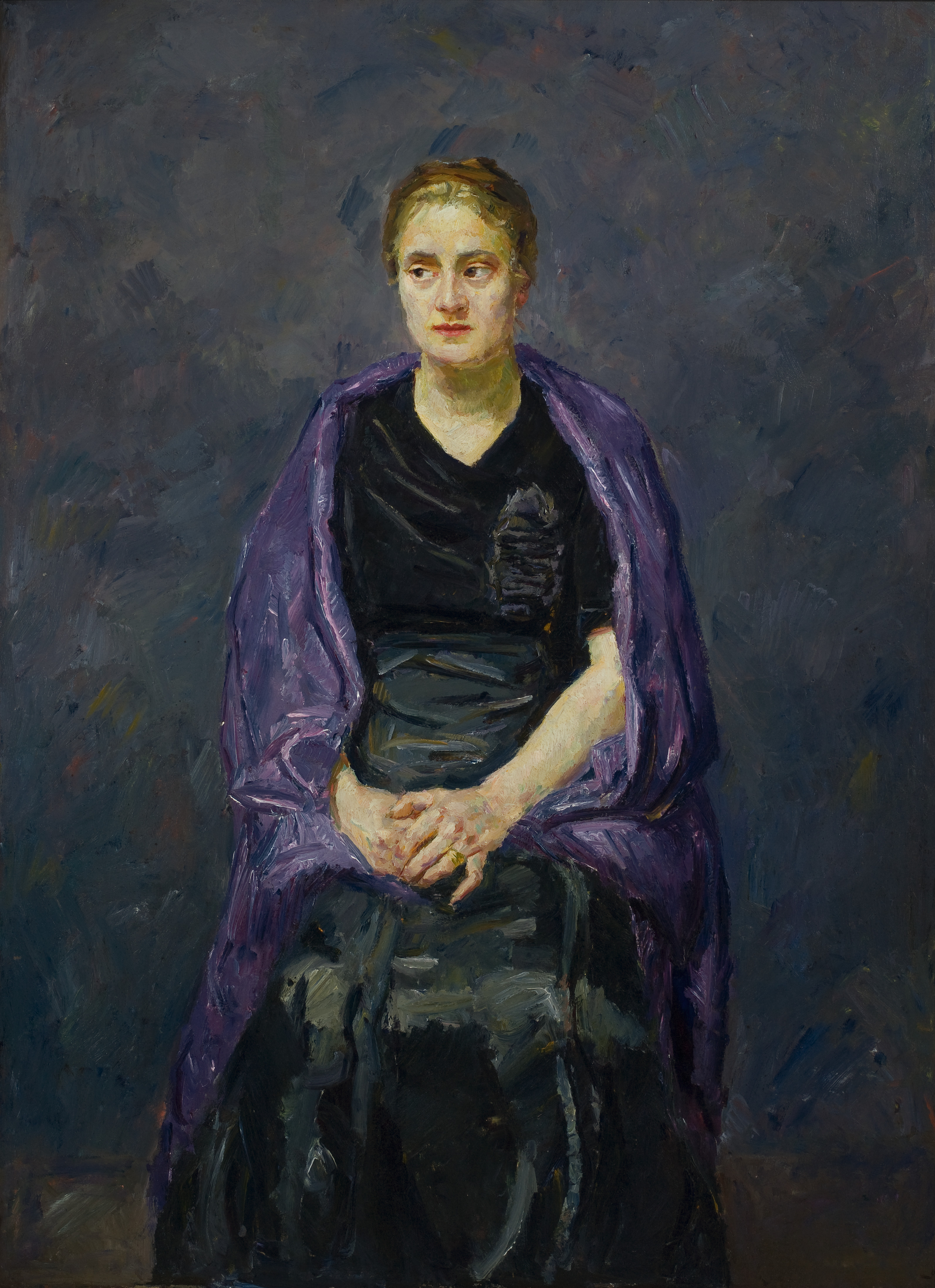
Minna Beckmann-Tube in a portrait by Max Beckmann, Portrait of Mink with Violet Shawl (1910), Saint Louis Art Museum

Minna Beckmann-Tube (5 July 1881 – 30 July 1964) was a German painter and opera singer. She is best known as the first wife of the painter and draftsman Max Beckmann.

== Life ==
The daughter of a Protestant military chaplain, Minna Tube was born on June 5, 1881 in Metz then a German city. Her family later moved to Posen, Danzig and Altenburg. At a very young age, she wanted to become a painter. She met the draftsman and painter Max Beckmann in 1903 at the Grand-Ducal Saxon Art School in Weimar. In 1906, she married Beckmann and the following year they moved to Berlin-Hermsdorf. Minna took care of the interior decoration of their new home herself. They had a son, Peter, in 1907.

Having given up painting, she took singing lessons. As soprano or mezzo-soprano, she went on stage in 1912, then performed in Elberfeld, Dessau and Chemnitz. From 1918 to 1925, she worked for the Graz Opera in Austria, where she played the roles of Brünnhilde, Freya, but also Venus and Isolde in Richard Wagner's operas. At that time, the couple lived between Berlin, Frankfurt and Graz. Max Beckmann left Minna in 1925 to marry Mathilde Kaulbach, the painter Friedrich August von Kaulbach's daughter.

After her divorce, Minna continued her singing career, but she remained linked to Max Beckmann for the rest of her life. In 1945, in front of the advance of the American and Soviet armies, she took refuge in Gauting, in Bavaria. There, in 1951, she founded the Max Beckmann association, in homage to her first husband.

Beckmann-Tube died in Gauting on July 30, 1964. While many of Max Beckmann's paintings represent her, Minna Tube did not leave any sound recordings.

== Selected works ==
- Großmutter Tube und Enkel Peter, 1914, oil on canvas
- Selbstbildnis mit Sohn Peter, c. 1915, oil on canvas
- Jünglingsportät (Peter Beckmann), c. 1923, oil on canvas
- Bildnis Peter Beckmann, 1933, oil on canvas
- Bildnis Maja Beckmann, 1950, oil
- Bildnis Mayen Beckmann, 1954, oil on canvas

== Bibliography ==
- Max Beckmann: Briefe im Kriege. Gesammelt von Minna Tube. Berlin, 1916
- Minna Tube: Erinnerungen an Max Beckmann. In Doris Schmidt (dir.): Max Beckmann: Frühe Tagebücher. Munich, 1985, p. 157 - 186
- Stephan Reimertz: Max Beckmann und Minna Tube: Eine Liebe im Porträt, Rowohlt Berlin 1996
- ders.: Max Beckmann: Biographie., Luchterhand, Munich, 2003
- Galerie Berlin: Zeit zu leben: Max Beckmann, Minna Beckmann-Tube, Bernhard Heisig, Galerie Berlin, Berlin, 1992
- Max Beckmann Archiv (dir.): Minna Beckmann-Tube, Munich, 1998
- Cornelia Wieg (dir.): Max Beckmann seiner Liebsten: Ein Doppelporträt, Stuttgart, 2005
