= Max Beckmann =

German painter (1884–1950)

- Beckmann in 1922
- Born: Max Carl Friedrich Beckmann; February 12, 1884; Leipzig, German Empire
- Died: December 27, 1950 (aged 66); New York City, U.S.
- Known for: Painting; Sculpture; Drawing; Printmaking
- Notable work: The Night, Departure
- Movement: New Objectivity; Expressionism

Max Carl Friedrich Beckmann (February 12, 1884 – December 27, 1950) was a German painter, draftsman, printmaker, sculptor, and writer. Although he is classified as an Expressionist artist, he rejected both the term and the movement. In the 1920s, he was associated with the New Objectivity (Neue Sachlichkeit), an outgrowth of Expressionism that opposed its introverted emotionalism. Even when dealing with light subject matter like circus performers, Beckmann often had an undercurrent of moodiness or unease in his works. By the 1930s, his work became more explicit in its horrifying imagery and distorted forms with combination of brutal realism and social criticism, coinciding with the rise of Nazism in Germany.

== Life ==
Max Beckmann was born into a middle-class family in Leipzig, Saxony. From his youth he pitted himself against the old masters. His traumatic experiences of World War I, in which he volunteered as a medical orderly, coincided with a dramatic transformation of his style from academically correct depictions to a distortion of both figure and space, reflecting his altered vision of himself and humanity. He was discharged from the military after suffering a nervous breakdown.

He is known for the self-portraits painted throughout his life, their number and intensity rivaled only by those of Rembrandt and Picasso. Well-read in philosophy and literature, Beckmann also contemplated mysticism and theosophy in search of the "Self". As a true painter-thinker, he strove to find the hidden spiritual dimension in his subjects (Beckmann's 1948 Letters to a Woman Painter provides a statement of his approach to art).

Beckmann enjoyed great success and official honors during the Weimar Republic. In 1925, he was selected to teach a master class at the Städelschule Academy of Fine Art in Frankfurt. Some of his most famous students included Theo Garve, Leo Maillet and Marie-Louise von Motesiczky. In 1927, he received the Honorary Empire Prize for German Art and the Gold Medal of the City of Düsseldorf; the National Gallery in Berlin acquired his painting The Bark and, in 1928, purchased his Self-Portrait in Tuxedo. By the early 1930s, a series of major exhibitions, including large retrospectives at the Städtische Kunsthalle Mannheim (1928) and in Basel and Zurich (1930), together with numerous publications, showed the high esteem in which Beckmann was held.

Beckmann Self-Portraits

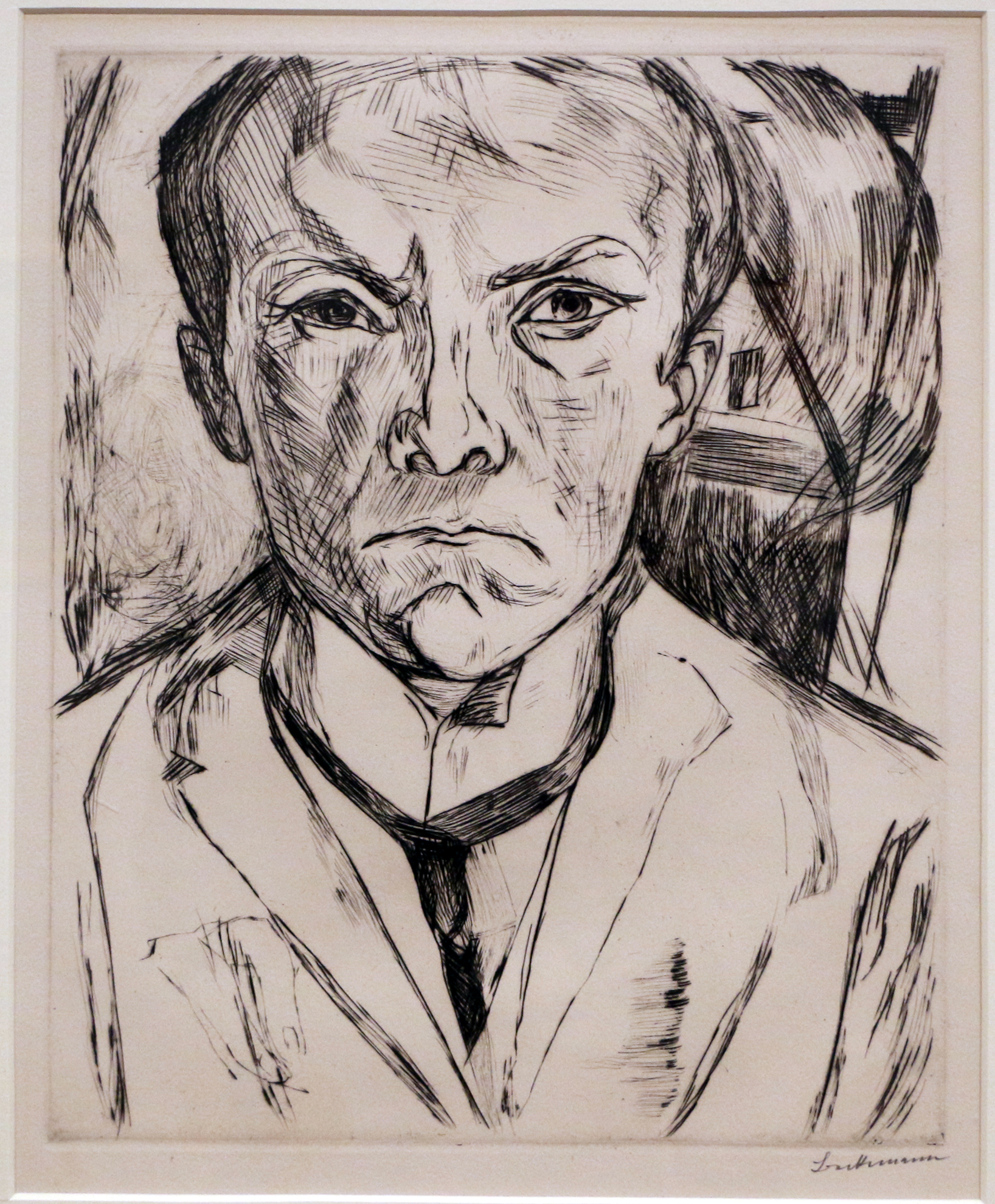
Self-Portrait, House Gable in Background, drypoint, 1918

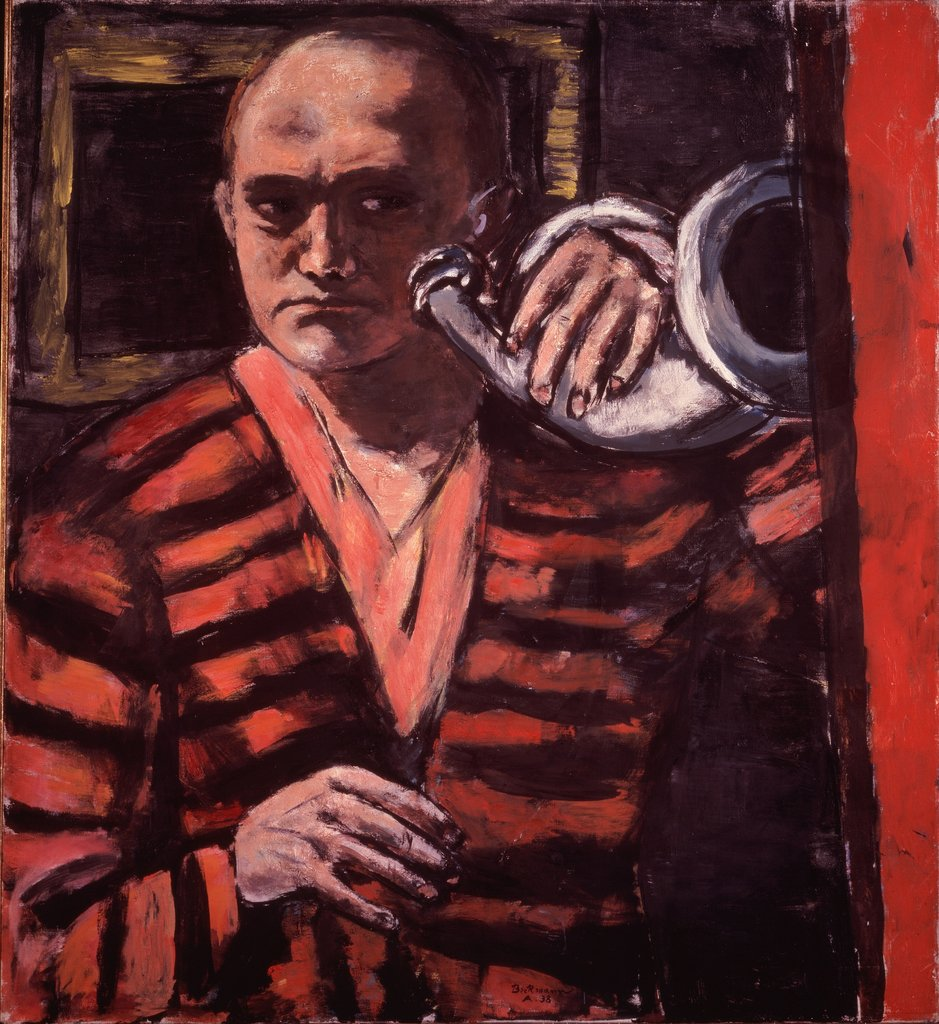
Self-Portrait with Horn, 1938

His fortunes changed with the rise to power of Adolf Hitler, whose dislike of modern art quickly led to its suppression by the state. In 1933, the Nazi government called Beckmann a "cultural Bolshevik" and dismissed him from his teaching position at the Art School in Frankfurt. In 1937, the government confiscated more than 500 of his works from German museums, putting several on display in the notorious Degenerate Art exhibition in Munich. The day after Hitler's radio speech about degenerate art in 1937, Beckmann left Germany with his second wife, Quappi, for the Netherlands.

For ten years, Beckmann lived in self-imposed exile in Amsterdam, failing in his desperate attempts to obtain a visa for the United States. In 1944, the Germans attempted to draft him into the army, although the sixty-year-old artist had suffered a heart attack. The works completed in his Amsterdam studio were even more powerful and intense than the ones of his master years in Frankfurt. They included several large triptychs, which stand as a summation of Beckmann's art.

In 1947, Beckmann took a position at the St. Louis School of Fine Arts at Washington University. During the last three years of his life, he taught at Washington University (alongside the German-American painter and printmaker Werner Drewes), and at the Brooklyn Museum. He came to St. Louis at the invitation of Perry T. Rathbone, director of the Saint Louis Art Museum. Rathbone arranged for Washington University to hire Beckmann as an art teacher, filling a vacancy left by Philip Guston, who had taken a leave. The first Beckmann retrospective in the United States took place in 1948 at the City Art Museum, Saint Louis. In St. Louis, Morton D. May became his patron and, already an avid amateur photographer and painter, a student of the artist. May later donated much of his large collection of Beckmann's works to the St. Louis Art Museum. Beckmann also helped him learn to appreciate Oceanian and African art.

After stops in Denver and Chicago, he and Quappi took an apartment at 38 West 69th Street in Manhattan. In 1949 he obtained a professorship at the Brooklyn Museum Art School.

Beckmann suffered from angina pectoris and died after Christmas 1950, struck down by a heart attack at the corner of 69th Street and Central Park West in New York City, not far from his apartment building. As the artist's widow recalled, he was on his way to see one of his paintings at the Metropolitan Museum of Art. Beckmann had a one-man show at the Venice Biennale of 1950, the year of his death. In his final year of 1950, he also painted the work Falling Man which is considered both a reflection on mortality and eerily predictive of the jumpers and other doomed people falling from the World Trade Center Towers during the September 11 attacks.

== Themes ==
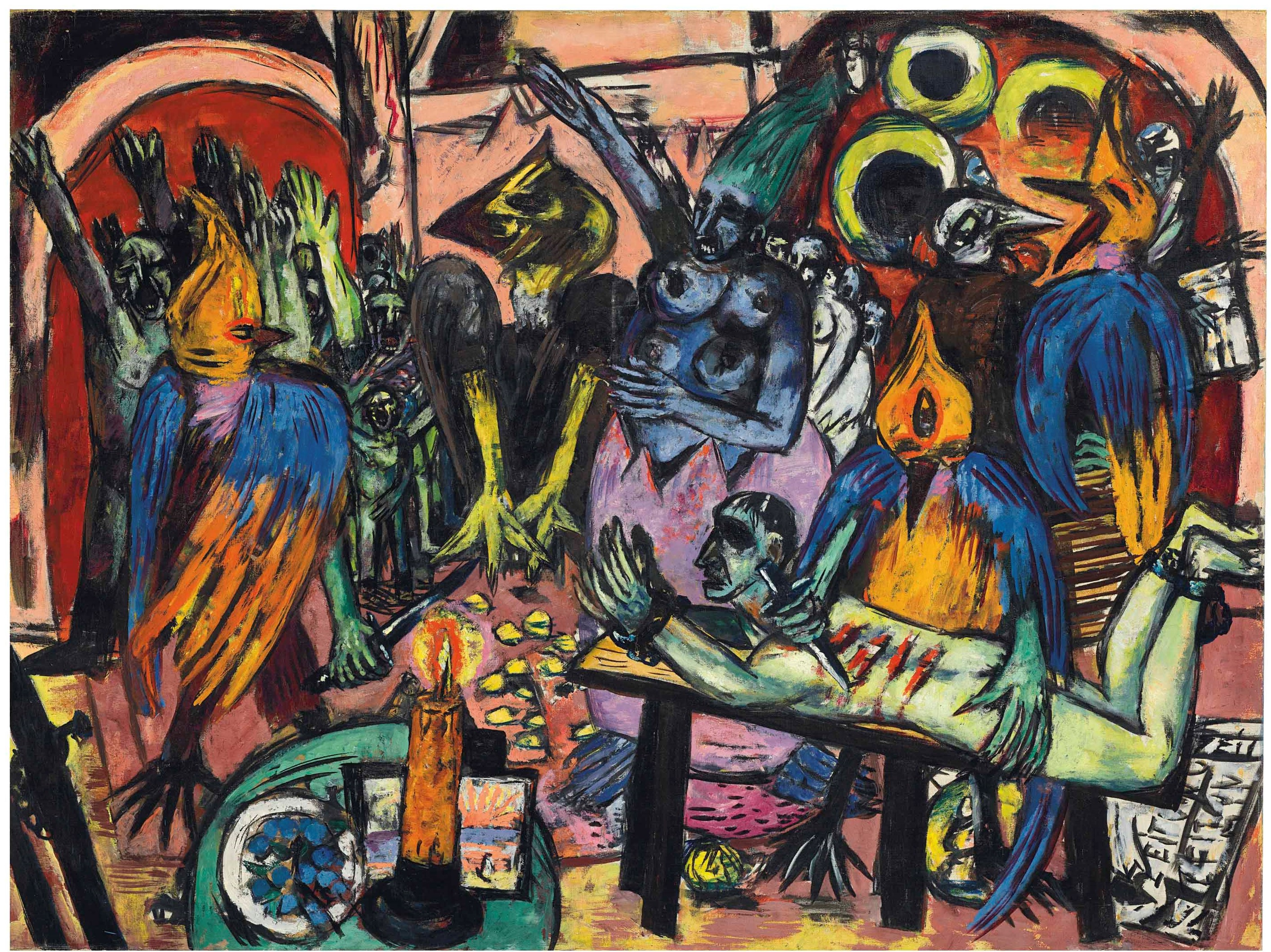
Birds’ Hell, 1937–1938

Unlike several of his avant-garde contemporaries, Beckmann rejected non-representational painting; instead, he took up and advanced the tradition of figurative painting. He greatly admired not only Cézanne and Van Gogh, but also Blake, Rembrandt, and Rubens, as well as Northern European artists of the late Middle Ages and early Renaissance, such as Bosch, Bruegel, and Matthias Grünewald. His style and method of composition are partially rooted in the imagery of medieval stained glass.

Beckmann often worked with paintings with themes of portraiture, landscape, still life, and history painting. His diverse body of work created a very personal but authentic version of modernism, one with a healthy deference to traditional forms. Beckmann reinvented the religious triptych and expanded this archetype of medieval painting into an allegory of contemporary humanity.

From his beginnings in the fin de siècle to the period after World War II, Beckmann reflected an era of radical changes in both art and history in his work. Many of Beckmann's paintings express the agonies of Europe in the first half of the 20th century. Some of his imagery refers to the decadent glamour of the Weimar Republic's cabaret culture, but from the 1930s on, his works often contain mythologized references to the brutalities of the Nazis. Beyond these immediate concerns, his subjects and symbols assume a larger meaning, voicing universal themes of terror, redemption, and the mysteries of eternity and fate.

His Self-Portrait with Horn (1938), painted during his exile in Amsterdam, demonstrates his use of symbols. Musical instruments are featured in many of his paintings; in this case, a horn that the artist holds as if it were a telescope by which he intends to explore the darkness surrounding him. The tight framing of the figure within the boundaries of the canvas emphasize his entrapment. Art historian Cornelia Stabenow terms the painting "the most melancholy, but also the most mystifying, of his self-portraits".

== Legacy ==
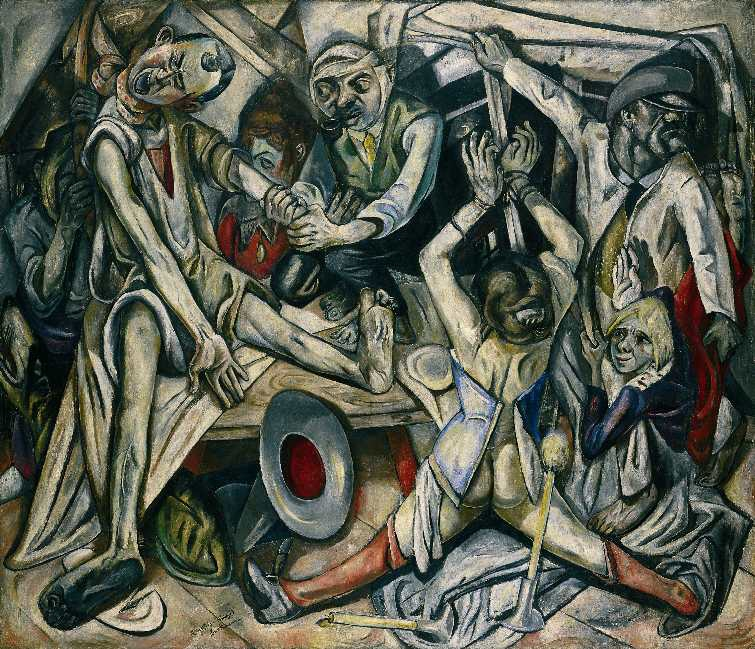
The Night (Die Nacht), 1918–1919, oil on canvas, 133 × 154 cm, Kunstsammlung Nordrhein-Westfalen, Düsseldorf

Many of Beckmann's late paintings are displayed in American museums. He exerted a profound influence on such American painters as Philip Guston and Nathan Oliveira, and, indeed, on Boston Expressionism, the art movement that later expanded nationally and is now called American Figurative Expressionism. His posthumous reputation perhaps suffered from his very individual artistic path; like Oskar Kokoschka, he defies the convenient categorization that provides themes for critics, art historians and curators. Other than a major retrospective at New York's Museum of Modern Art, the Boston Museum of Fine Arts and the Art Institute of Chicago in 1964–65 (with an excellent catalogue by Peter Selz), and MoMA's prominent display of the triptych Departure, his work was little seen in much of the United States for decades. His 1984 centenary was marked in the New York area only by a modest exhibit at Nassau County's suburban art museum. The Saint Louis Art Museum holds the largest public collection of Beckmann paintings in the world and held a major exhibition of his work in 1998.

Since the late 20th century, Beckmann's work has gained an increasing international reputation. There have been retrospectives and exhibitions at the Museum of Modern Art (1995) and the Guggenheim Museum (1996) in New York, and the principal museums of Rome (1996), Valencia (1996), Madrid (1997), Zurich (1998), Munich (2000), Frankfurt (2006) and Amsterdam (2007). In Spain and Italy, Beckmann's work has been accessible to a wider public for the first time. A large-scale Beckmann retrospective was exhibited at the Centre Pompidou in Paris (2002) and Tate Modern in London (2003). In 2011, the Städel in Frankfurt devoted an entire room to the artist in its newly fitted permanent exhibition of modern art.

The Max Beckmann Gesellschaft was first established by Wilhelm Hausenstein, Benno Reifenberg and others. The Max Beckmann Archiv was established in 1977 and is under the auspices of the Bavarian State Painting Collections.

In 1996, Piper, Beckmann's German publisher, released the third and last volume of the artist's letters, whose wit and vision rank him among the strongest writers of the German language. His essays, plays and, above all, his diaries are also unique historical documents. A selection of Beckmann's writings was issued in the United States by University of Chicago Press in 1996.

From 7 March - 8 June 1997, the Fundación Juan March Madrid displayed 34 of Beckmann’s paintings created between 1905 and 1950 in the first retrospective of Beckmann’s paintings in Spain.

In 2002, the Metropolitan Museum of Art acquired Beckmann's Hell, a series of 11 lithographs. In 2003, the Museum displayed the series in its exhibition Max Beckmann's "Hell."

In 2003, Stephan Reimertz, Parisian novelist and art historian, published a biography of Max Beckmann. It presents many photos and sources for the first time. The biography reveals Beckmann's contemplations of writers and philosophers such as Dostoyevsky, Schopenhauer, Nietzsche, and Richard Wagner. The book has not yet been translated into English.

In 2005, the Museo de Arte Abstracto Español, Cuenca, exhibited Beckmann. Von der Heydt-Museum, Wuppertal, featuring 53 engravings and 2 paintings from the Von der Heydt-Museum in Wuppertal. The exhibit traveled to the Museu Fundación Juan March, Palma later that year.

In 2015, the Saint Louis Art Museum published Max Beckmann at the Saint Louis Art Museum: The Paintings, by Lynette Roth. It is a comprehensive look at the Beckmann paintings at SLAM, the largest collection of them in the world, and places both artist and works in a broader context.

In 2016, the Metropolitan Museum of Art exhibited Max Beckmann in New York that highlighted his relationship with New York, including 14 paintings created during his time in New York in 1949-1950. A catalog of the same name by Sabine Rewald was published in conjunction with the exhibit. ISBN 978-1-588-39600-6

Beckmann’s work was the focus of a 2023-2024 exhibit at the Neue Galerie, New York City titled, “Max Beckmann: The Formative Years, 1915-1925.” A catalog of the same name, edited by Olaf Peters was published in conjunction with the exhibit. ISBN 9783791379944

== Art market ==
Although Beckmann is considered an important 20th-century artist, he has never been a household name, and his works have mostly appealed to a niche market of German and Austrian collectors. In 1921, Beckmann signed an exclusive contract with the print-dealer J. B. Neumann in Berlin. In 1938, he had the first of numerous exhibitions at Curt Valentin’s Buchholz Gallery, New York.

Today, Beckmann's large paintings routinely sell for more than $1 million, and his self-portraits generally command the highest prices. In 2001, Ronald Lauder paid $22.5 million at Sotheby's New York for Beckmann's Self-Portrait with Horn (1938), and displayed it at the Neue Galerie in New York. In 2017, an anonymous bidder paid the record sum of $45.8 million for Beckmann's Hölle der Vögel (Birds' Hell) (1938) at Christie's in London; this was also a new world record for a German Expressionism artwork. In 2022, Self-Portrait Yellow-Pink (1943) sold at a Berlin auction for 20 million euros ($20.7 million), a price that appears to be a record for an art auction in Germany.

== Rediscovered works ==
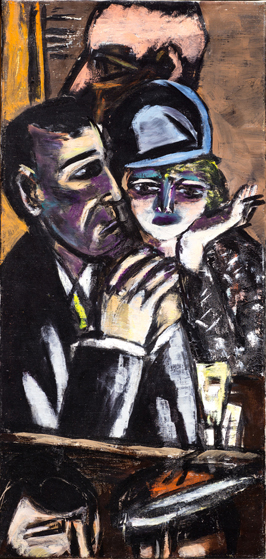
Bar, Brown – an oil painting found in Gurlitt trove

The Gurlitt trove, a vast collection of artwork amassed by Hildebrand Gurlitt during the Nazi era, was discovered in a Munich apartment in 2012. The collection included artwork looted from Jews by the Nazis.

Bar, Brown and other important works by Beckmann were found in the trove. Some of these works are the subject of intense scrutiny by the German police and art historians for their provenance and sale during the Nazi period.

== See also ==
- Beckmann and Theosophy
- Expressionism
- New objectivity
