= Geschichte des Qorāns =

Foundational book in Quranic studies

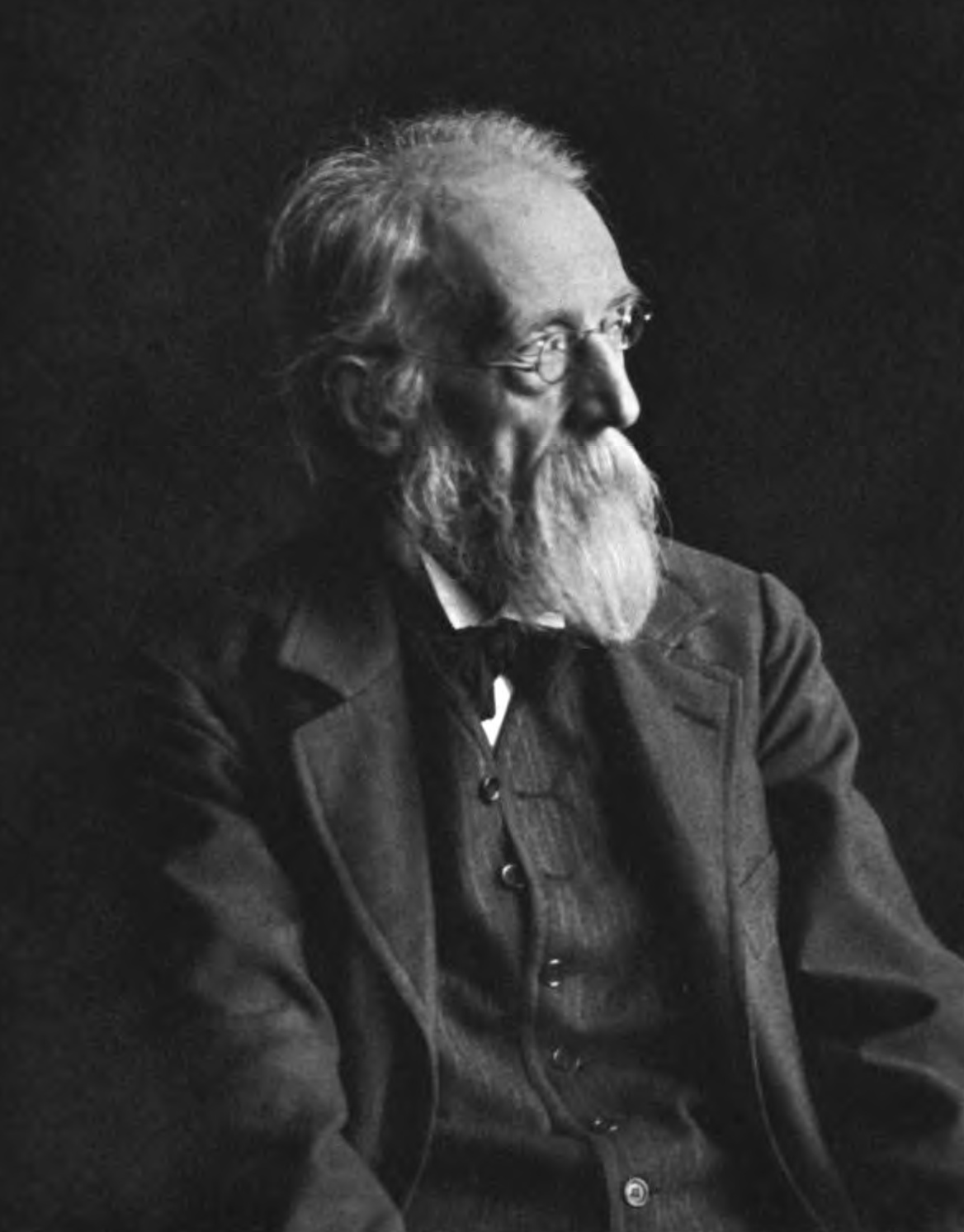
Theodor Nöldeke

Geschichte des Qorāns (English: History of the Quran) is a foundational work in Quranic studies by German scholar Theodor Nöldeke (1836–1930). It was first published in 1860, and then revised and expanded by Nöldeke's students and successors between 1909 and 1938. An English translation came out in 2013.

Nöldeke's book represented a major leap forward in the field of Quranic studies, aided by access to collections of manuscripts in Germany and the recent publication of the al-Itqān fī ʿulūm al-Qurʾan, a major 15th-century traditional commentary on the Quran by Jalāl al-Dīn al-Suyūṭī, in 1857. Nöldeke reassessed the traditional chronology of the Quran, placing each surah of the Quran into either a Meccan or a Medinan period, with the Meccan period being earlier. The Meccan period was also split into Early, Middle, and Late Meccan phases. Since its publication, the Geschichte has exerted a great influence over the field of Quranic studies, and was described by the scholar Angelika Neuwirth as "the rock of our church".

== Background and publication ==
The Geschichte, a primarily philological work written in German, emerged from a dissertation Nöldeke began during his university studies, which was completed in 1856 and titled De origine et compositione surarum qoranicarum ipsiusque Qorani (On the origin and composition of the Qur'anic suras and the Qur'an itself).

Compared to earlier studies of the Quran by Westerners, Nöldeke uncoupled the study of the scripture from inquiries into the life of Muhammad. Furthermore, unlike predecessors such as William Muir, Nöldeke did not have a missionary zeal. Instead, Nöldeke studied the Quran for its own sake.

Before Nöldeke, some work had already been done on trying to establish a chronology of the Quran, primarily that of William Muir. However, Nöldeke's work was far more successful and influential.

== Chronology ==
One of the most important aspects of Nöldeke's argument was his periodisation of the Quranic surahs into a tripartite "Meccan" phase (Early, Middle, and Late Meccan surahs) followed by a "Medinan" phase (an idea already conceived by his predecessor, Gustav Weil). Nöldeke followed the traditional chronological division of suras (i.e. the division used by Muslim scholars), but deviated from it in places. At the same time, Nöldeke also considered his division to be malleable and tentative to a degree as opposed to absolute and deciding. As such, Nöldeke's work also produced a consensus among Western scholars that the Quran reflected the preaching of Muhammad in two distinct locations, namely Mecca and Medina. Nöldeke also accepted that a canonization event occurred during the reign of the third caliph, Uthman.

- Group 1. First Meccan Period (48 Surahs): Surahs 96; 74; 111; 106; 108; 104; 107; 102; 105; 92; 90; 94; 93; 97; 86; 91; 80; 68; 87; 95; 103; 85; 73; 101; 99; 82; 81; 53; 84; 100; 79; 77; 78; 88; 89; 75; 83; 69; 51; 52; 56; 70; 55; 112; 109; 113; 114; 1
- Group 2. Second Meccan Period (21 Surahs): 54; 37; 71; 76; 44; 50; 20; 26; 15; 19; 38; 36; 43; 72; 67; 23; 21; 25; 17; 27; 18
- Group 3. Third Meccan Period (21 Surahs): 32; 41; 45; 16; 30; 11; 14; 12; 40; 28; 39; 29; 31; 42; 10; 34; 35; 7; 46; 6; 13
- Group 4. Medinan Period (24 Surahs): 2; 98; 64; 62; 8; 47; 3; 61; 57; 4; 65; 59; 33; 63; 24; 58; 22; 48; 66; 60; 110; 49; 9; 5

== Revised editions ==
First published in 1860, the Geschichte was revised and expanded by Nöldeke's students and successors Friedrich Schwally, Gotthelf Bergsträsser and Otto Pretzl until 1938. Revisions and expansions by Schwally appeared between 1909 and 1919, and this included a new chapter not present in the previous edition, titled "Recent Christian Research on the Qur’an". Additional supplements by Bergsträsser appeared from 1926 to 1929, and Pretzl's supplements were later published in 1938. The expansions by Bergsträsser and Pretzl brought into particular focus the subject of the variant readings (qirāʼāt) of the Quran including how they had been received in the history of classical scholarship.

== Reception ==
Though Nöldeke's work has been followed closely by some and rejected by others, it has been so influential that at least one scholar has referred to his work as "the rock of our church". For decades, it was the only substantive scholarly introduction to the Quran in any European language.

In 2013, a complete translation of the volume into English was published.

The Corpus Coranicum project has been working with the aim of revising Nöldeke's chronology since the developments that have occurred since its publication.

== See also ==
- Bazargan chronology
