= Dīn =

Arabic and Islamic term for "religion" or "way of life"

Dīn, or Deen, is an Islamic term from Arabic, and originally from Middle Persian, which means "religion" or "way of life". In Islam, dīn is the encompassment of a human being's relationship to Allah.

In Islamic terminology, the word refers to the way of life Muslims must adopt to comply with divine law, encompassing beliefs, character and deeds. The term appears in the Quran 98 times with different connotations, including in the phrase yawm ad-dīn (Arabic: يوم الدين), generally translated to "Day of Judgment" or the famous verse La ikraha fid din which translates to "Let there be no compulsion in religion" (Abdullah Yusuf Ali translation).

== Etymology ==
Orientalist Arthur Jeffery derives the religious term dīn as pertaining to judgement, law, religion, debt from the Middle Persian den, itself derived from the Zoroastrian Avestan notion daena, he furthermore claimed that dīn "related to religion" and the Arabic cognate dīn "judgement, debt etc..." are two separate words of different origin. It may be related to Aramaic notions of judgment as seen in Rabbinic usage. Many scholars, such as Nöldeke, Vollers, Mushegh Asatrian, and Johnny Cheung are in agreement with this etymology. Others like Gaudefroy-Demombynes and Gardet, have found this derivation unconvincing. Nonetheless, al-Khafaji and Tha'ahbi have included the term dīn as related to religion in their list of foreign words, due to its lack of verbal root. According to the Encyclopaedia of the Qur'ān, prior to the 20th century, "English word 'religion' had no direct equivalent in Arabic nor had the Arabic word dīn in English".

The Arabic dīn ("judgement, debt," etc.) has Semitic cognates, including the Hebrew dīn (דין), Aramaic dīnā (דִּינָא), Amharic dañä (ዳኘ), and Ugaritic dyn (𐎄𐎊𐎐), though different meaning from dīn relating to religion.

The Arabic sense of judgment is likely analogous to the Hebraeo-Aramaic cognate root. The Hebrew term "דין", transliterated as dīn, means either "law" or "judgement". In the Kabbalah of Judaism, the term can, alongside "Gevurah" (cognate to the feminine form of Arabic adjective "Jabārah جَبَّارَة"), refer to "power" and "judgement". In ancient Israel, the term featured heavily in administrative and legal proceedings i.e. beth din, literally "the house of judgement", the ancient building block of the Jewish legal system. The Arabic sense "custom, usage" has been derived by classical and modern lexicologists from the Arabic verbal forms dāna (دانى, "be indebted") and dāna li- (-دانى لِ, "submit to"). Louis Gardet sees the Hebraic and Arabic senses as related through the notions of retribution, debt, obligation, custom, and direction, prompting him to translate yawm ad-din as: "the day when God gives a direction to each human being". This view is not supported by the majority of scholars, who translate yawm ad-din as "the day of judgement".

Quranic studies scholar Mohsen Goudarzi has argued that in the Quran dīn means "worship", Islam means "monotheism" and muslim means "monotheist". Until the 8th century, the term muslim was more inclusive, including anyone who was considered to be submitting to God—e.g. Christians and Jews—and the term mu'min was instead used to refer to believers in Islam as a distinct religion.

== Use in Islam ==
It has been said that the word dīn appears in as many as 79 verses in the Quran, but because there is no exact English translation of the term, its precise definition has been the subject of some misunderstanding and disagreement. For instance, the term is often translated in parts of the Quran as "religion" in modern editions. Indeed, prior to the 20th century the English word "religion" did not have an equivalent term in Arabic and when comparing French and English translations from the 1600s and earlier Latin translations from the 12th century, "din" is usually translated as "law" across languages and times.

Some Quranic scholars have translated dīn in places as "faith". Others suggest that the term "has been used in various forms and meanings, e.g., system, power, supremacy, ascendancy, sovereignty or lordship, dominion, law, constitution, mastery, government, realm, decision, definite outcome, reward and punishment. On the other hand, this word is also used in the sense of obedience, submission and allegiance".

In addition to the two broad usages referred to so far, of sovereignty on the one hand and submission on the other, others have noted that the term dīn is also widely used in translations of the Quran in a third sense. Most famously in its opening chapter, al-Fatihah, the term is translated in almost all English translations as "judgment":

1:3 مَٰلِكِ يَوْمِ ٱلدِّينِ transliterated as "Maliki yawmi d-Dīni," and (usually) translated as "Master of the Day of Judgment".

The well-known Islamic scholar, Fazlur Rahman Malik, suggested that dīn is best considered as "the way-to-be-followed". In that interpretation, dīn is the exact correlate of Sharia: "whereas Shari'a is the ordaining of the Way and its proper subject is God, Dīn is the following of that Way, and its subject is man". Thus, "if we abstract from the Divine and the human points of reference, Shari'a and Dīn would be identical as far as the 'Way' and its content are concerned".

In many hadith, the dīn has been described as a midway lifestyle:

Narrated by Abu Hurayra: the Prophet ﷺ said, "Religion (dīn) is very easy and whoever overburdens himself in his religion will not be able to continue in that way. So you should not be extremists, but try to be near to perfection and receive the good tidings that you will be rewarded; and gain strength by worshipping in the mornings, the nights."

— Sahih al-Bukhari, 1:2:38, (Fath-ul-Bari, Page 102, Vol 1)

== See also ==
- Glossary of Islam
- Outline of Islam
- Index of Islam-related articles
- List of Islamic terms in Arabic
- Christian worldview
- Ad-Din
- Taqwa
- Wasat
- Dharma
- Halakha
- Kabbalah
