= Mohsen Goudarzi =

Iranian Quranic studies scholar

Mohsen Goudarzi Taghanaki is an Iranian Quranic studies scholar and associate professor of Islamic studies at Harvard Divinity School.

He investigates the Quran and early Islamic history through multiple analytical lenses, such as literary, linguistic, comparative, and historical methods. He is especially focused on understanding how the Qur'an reveals the religious developments of Late Antiquity and the early Islamic period.

== Biography ==
=== Early life and education ===
Goudarzi grew up in Tehran, Iran. Following high school, he earned both undergraduate and graduate degrees in computer engineering. Subsequently, he pursued a master's degree in religious studies at Stanford University, driven by a longstanding interest in the humanities and religious history. Goudarzi received his PhD from Harvard University in 2018.

=== Career ===
Mohsen Goudarzi became a faculty member at Harvard Divinity School in July 2021. Before that, he was an assistant professor in the Department of Classical and Near Eastern Studies at the University of Minnesota, starting in 2018.

=== Personal life ===
Mohsen Goudarzi is married to Narges Afshordi.

== Scholarly views and contributions ==
=== Classification of Quranic studies scholars ===
Behnam Sadeghi and Mohsen Goudarzi classify Quranic studies scholars into four main groups. "Traditionalists" accept the conventional Muslim narrative about the Quran's compilation and canonization. "Revisionists," including scholars like Wansbrough, Patricia Crone, Alfred Louis de Prémare, and David Powers, view the process as more complex and extended. "Skeptics" doubt the traditional accounts but at the same time find the revisionist theories unconvincing. Lastly, "neotraditionalists," such as Motzki, Muhammad Muhaysin, and Michael Cook (who transitioned from revisionism), critically examine the sources to support key aspects of the traditional account, without accepting it fully at face value. Although this classification has been generally accepted by many scholars, Mun'im Sirry finds it "problematic as it is based on the pejorative assumption that traditionalists are, by definition, not critical."

=== Textual history of the Quran ===
Sadeghi and Goudarzi seeks to demonstrate that the transmission of the Quran occurred "most likely via hearers who wrote down a text that was directed by the prophet."

According to Éléonore Cellard, Sadeghi and Goudarzi's textual reconstruction is "currently the most complete edition of the Saṇā palimpsest." Marijn van Putten states that Sadeghi and Goudarzi's work "has significantly contributed to a better understanding of the textual history of the Quran." According to Seyfeddin Kara, this study has produced "ground-breaking results", adding that "there have been subsequent studies of the Ṣanʿāʾ palimpsests but nevertheless they did not fundamentally challenge the findings of Sadeghi and Goudarzi about the early closure of the Qurʼanic canon."

=== Scripturology ===
Goudarzi defends a two kitab hypothesis, arguing that the Torah and the Qur'an are the only two scriptures referred to as "kitāb" by the Qur'an due to their unique nature as comprehensive texts providing historical and legal knowledge. In contrast, the Injil, or Gospels, is not considered a complete "kitāb" in the same way as the Torah. According to Nicolai Sinai, Goudarzi's arguments for two kitab hypothesis is "rigorous and sophisticated". His thesis has been endorsed by Saqib Hussain in his 2022 Oxford PhD dissertation.

=== Ishmaelite particularism ===
Goudarzi contends that the Qur'an introduces a unique form of particularism, without discarding its universalist tendencies, not rooted in Israelite traditions but in Ishmaelite ones, emphasizing the descendants of both Israel and Ishmael. According to Holger Zellentin, such a scheme already appears to align with the Qur'an's broader narrative concerning Israelite law.

== Works ==
- Behnam Sadeghi & Mohsen Goudarzi, Ṣanā 1 and the Origins of the Qurān. Der Islam 87 (2012): 1–129.
  - For a critical review of Sadeghi and Goudarzi, see Hilali, Asma (2015). "Was the Ṣanā Qurān Palimpsest a Work in Progress?". The Yemeni Manuscript Tradition. BRILL. pp. 12–27. doi:10.1163/9789004289765_003.
- Worship (dīn), Monotheism (islām), and the Qur’an’s Cultic Decalogue, Journal of the International Qur’anic Studies Association 8 (2023): 30–71
- The Eucharist in the Qur’an, Islam and Christian-Muslim Relations 34.2 (2023): 113–33
- Unearthing Abraham’s Altar: The cultic dimensions of dīn, islām, and ḥanīf in the Qur’an, Journal of Near Eastern Studies 82.1 (2023): 77–102.
- The Written Torah and the Oral Quran in Pagan Mecca: Towards a New Reading of Q 6:91. In Bruce Fudge et al. (eds), Non Sola Scriptura: Essays on the Qur’an and Islam in Honor of William A. Graham (Routledge, 2022), 3–22.
- Peering Behind the Lines. Harvard Theological Review 113.3 (2020): 421–435.
- The Ascent of Ishmael: Genealogy, Covenant, and Identity in Early Islam. Arabica 66.5 (2019): 415–484.
- Inspiration, Intellect, and the Interpretation of Scripture in Post-Classical Islam. In Treasures of Knowledge: An Inventory of the Ottoman Palace Library (1502/3-1503/4), edited by G. Necipoğlu, C. Kafadar, and C. Fleischer (Brill, 2019), 267–308.
