= Mun'im Sirry =

Indonesian Quranic studies scholar

Mun'im Ahmad Sirry is an Indonesian Quranic studies scholar. He is assistant professor of theology at the University of Notre Dame.

== Biography ==
Sirry was born in West Bataal Village, Ganding District, Sumenep, Indonesia, to a farming family. He studied at TMI al-Amien Islamic Boarding School in Prenduan, Sumenep Madura, from 1983 to 1990. Following this, he pursued his undergraduate and graduate degrees at the Faculty of Sharia at the International Islamic University Islamabad in Pakistan from 1990 to 1996. Sirry then received a Fulbright scholarship to study in the United States, where he completed a master's degree at the University of California, Los Angeles, and earned his Ph.D. from the University of Chicago Divinity School in 2012. He co-edits the journal Islam and Christian-Muslim Relations with Professor Gabriel Said Reynolds.

== Works ==
- Youth, Education, and Islamic Radicalism: Religious Intolerance in Contemporary Indonesia (2024)
- The Qur'an with Cross-References (2022)
- Controversies over Islamic Origins: An Introduction to Traditionalism and Revisionism (2021)
- New Trends in Qur’ānic Studies: Text, Context, and Interpretation (2019) (ed.)
- Finding Beauty in the Other: Theological Reflections Across Religious Traditions (2017) (ed.) with Peter Casarella
- Scriptural Polemics: The Qur'an and Other Religions (2014)

== See also ==
- Walid Saleh
