= Zir bin Hubaysh =

Primary transmitter of the Qira'at

- زِرِّ بْنِ حُبَيْشٍ

Personal life
- Died: 700 CE / 81 AH Kufa
- Main interest: Qu'ran
- Known for: Qu'ran recitation, Hadith recitation
- Other name: Abu Maryam Zar bin Habish

Religious life
- Religion: Islam

Muslim leader
- Teacher: Abd Allah ibn Mas'ud and Ali

Zir bin Hubaysh (d. 700 CE / 81 AH) (Arabic: زِرِّ بْنِ حُبَيْشٍ) was a famous qur'an and hadith reciter.

Abu Maryam Zir bin Hubaysh, from the Asadi tribe, was a Muslim from Kufa and one of the narrators of Muhammad's hadiths (sayings).

He was born in the pre-Islamic era and converted to Islam. Afterward, he moved to Kufa. He then accompanied a delegation from the people of Kufa to Medina during the caliphate of Uthman bin Affan. There, he met companions of Muhammad such as Safwan bin Assal, Ubi bin Kaab, and Abd al-Rahman bin Awf, and he learned from them and acquired knowledge.

Zir bin Hubaysh learned the Quran from Abd Allah ibn Mas'ud and Ali bin Abi Talib, and he excelled in memorizing it. He became renowned for his recitation in Kufa, and many prominent individuals, including Yahya bin Wathab, Asim bin Abi al-Nujoud, Abu Ishaq al-Subaie, Suleiman bin Mahran al-Amash, and others, would recite the Quran according to his recitation. Aasim ibn Abi al-Najud said, "I have not seen anyone who recites better than Zir."

Zir bin Hubaysh narrated hadiths on the authority of several companions, including Umar bin Al-Khattab, Ali bin Abi Talib, Abdullah bin Masoud, Abd al-Rahman bin Awf, Abi bin Ka’b, Hudhayfah bin Al-Yaman, Shaqiq bin Salamah, Othman bin Affan, Ammar bin Yasser, Al-Abbas bin Abdul Muttalib, Safwan bin Asal, Saeed bin Zaid, Abdullah bin Amr Ibn al-Aas, Abu Dhar al-Ghifari, and Aisha bint Abi Bakr. Furthermore, he himself was narrated on the authority of by Asim bin Abi Al-Nujud, Abu Ishaq Al-Subaie, Al-Minhal bin Amr, Abda bin Abi Lubaba, Uday bin Thabit, Abu Ishaq Al-Shaibani, Abu Burdah bin Abi Musa Al-Ash’ari, Ismail bin Abi Khaled, Ibrahim bin Yazid Al-Nakha’i, Habib bin Abi Thabit, Zubaid Al-Yami, Talhah bin Masrif, Shamr bin Attia, Amer Al-Sha’bi, Abd al-Rahman bin Marzouq al-Dimashqi, Uthman bin al-Jahm, Alqama bin Murthad, Isa bin Asim al-Asadi, Isa bin Abd al-Rahman bin Abi Laila, and Abu Razin Masoud bin Malik al-Asadi.
