= Corpus Coranicum =

Research project

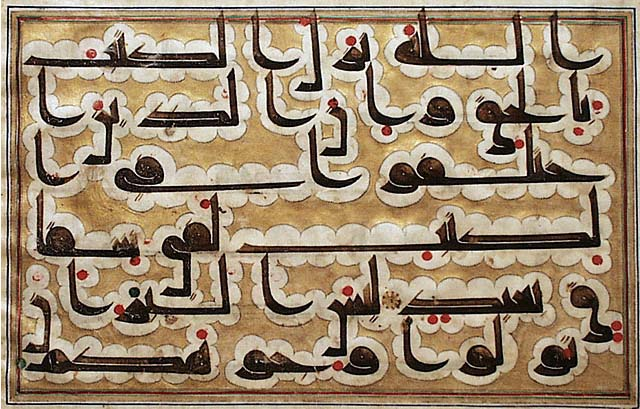
Quranic 9th-century manuscript page, surah 2:175-76 and 2:176-77

Corpus Coranicum (2007–2024) was a digital research project of the Berlin-Brandenburg Academy of Sciences and Humanities.

The project made sources accessible that are relevant for the history of the Quran. These primary texts include Jewish, Christian, and other textual remains from the world of the Quran. To trace its oral and written transmission further, early manuscripts of the Quran were catalogued and made available through the project's database. A literary commentary on the Quranic text completes the project.

Begun in 2007, the initial three-year database project was headed by two project leaders: Senior Professor of Arabic Studies Angelika Neuwirth (Freie Universität Berlin) was responsible for the commentary. The research centre was managed by Michael Marx, who is editor-in-chief of the "environmental texts" and the text documentation.

Since 2025, M. Marx has continued the adaptation, maintenance and digital publication of the databases under the roof of Corpus Coranicum e.V.

== Research units and methodology ==
The project will document the Quran in its handwritten form and oral tradition, and include an extensive commentary interpreting the text in the context of its historical development.

=== Manuscripta Coranica ===
In the Manuscripta Coranica, the earliest surviving handwritten witnesses to the text of the Quran are made available; in addition to images of the manuscripts preserved in libraries and private collections worldwide, the database contains various metadata on the documents. This includes palaeographic and codicological information, provenance, and current location (as far as known). Each entry displays the corresponding Arabic text of the 1924 Egyptian edition (Cairo) alongside the selected manuscript.

Some 2000 pages are transliterated in a markup system developed by the project. For date estimates of manuscripts, the project conducted carbon dating analysis of more than 40 documents.

=== Variae Lectiones Coranicae ===
Since early Arabic texts are often ambiguous because the script contains no or few diacritical marks (rasm), various interpretations of the Quranic text (variant readings) developed, some of which were subsequently treated as authoritative. These variants include consonantal mutations, and encompass the addition and removal of whole words. To follow the differences between the interpretations, the database Variae Lectiones Coranicae provides a synopsis of the readings used in different exegesis traditions. Each word of a surah can be selected for this purpose and its variants displayed. Both catalogues together aim to serve the research of written and oral transmission of the Quran.

=== Cultural understanding ===
A database of diverse texts (including pre-Quranic, Jewish, and Christian texts) places the development of the Quran in the context of its spatial and temporal environment and intends to foster better understanding of the cultural and religious horizons at the time of advent of Islam. The chronological-topographical boundaries of the chosen texts can be linked to the Europe-centred concept of Late Antiquity.

The project's research director, Michael Marx, told Der Spiegel that the Quran did not arise in a vacuum, as for the sake of simplicity some western researchers had supposed. The Arabian peninsula in the 7th century was exposed to the great Byzantine and Persian Empires as well as the ideas of Gnosticism, early Christianity, the ideals of ancient Arabic poetry and the ideas of rabbinic Judaism. Only in light of this world of ideas, Marx added, can the innovations of the Quran be clearly seen, and while parallels exist with non-Quranic texts, it is not a copy-and-paste job.

=== Commentary ===
The commentary focuses not only on individual problems but also includes form-critical analyses.

=== Research aids ===
A custom font was developed to correctly represent the languages in the digital publication: the "Coranica" Font. It is equipped with glyph sets for Ancient South Arabian, Arabic, Greek, Hebrew, etc. (Unicode).

=== Publication ===
The project publishes its findings digitally on their website, all content is made internationally available (open access). Its databases use SQL.

== Project History ==
In many respects, the project integrates itself into the research tradition of the early 1900 German speaking Oriental Studies. Among other things, it uses the methods of textual criticism and engages with existing preliminary work, including that of Abraham Geiger, Theodor Nöldeke and Arthur Jeffrey. The point of reference remains the chronology as established by the inner-Islamic tradition.

=== Luxenberg debate ===
The preparatory phase of the project (2005–2007) coincided with the period of intensive discussions on the preserved Quranic text. In 2000, an author working under the pseudonym Christoph Luxenberg published The Syro-Aramaic Reading of the Koran, a study in which he re-interpreted various passages of the Quran using his own readings. His hypotheses, methodology and results met with widespread rejection in the research community, but the study was able to initiate a deeper discussion of the traditions of the Quranic text. Even before the project began in 2007, Neuwirth and Marx also commented on the assumptions postulated by Luxenberg.

=== Gotthelf-Bergsträsser Archive ===
A focal point of work in the area of text documentation is the digitisation and evaluation of the Gotthelf-Bergsträsser Archive. This source material consists of photographs of ancient Quran manuscripts collected before World War II by Gotthelf Bergsträsser and Otto Pretzl. After the British RAF on 24 April 1944 bombarded the building where they were housed, Arabic studies scholar Anton Spitaler claimed the photograph collection had been destroyed. Towards the end of his life, however, he confessed to Neuwirth that he had hidden the photos for almost half a century, and Neuwirth assumed responsibility for the archive.

Although the photographs of the archive form an important part of the objects of study of the Corpus Coranicum, the research ambition of the project goes far beyond the critical apparatus formerly envisaged by Bergsträsser. According to his paper on the matter, this was intended as a commentary on the Cairo edition (1924), in which traditional readings as well as manuscript variants were to be recorded in order to produce a secure text—in the sense of the historical-critical method. These plans never came to fruition.

=== Schirrmacher controversy ===
In 2007 journalist-publisher Frank Schirrmacher wrote an article for the Frankfurt Book Fair suggesting that the academy's preparation of a historically critical Quran edition had been motivated by Pope Benedict XVI's ill-received Regensburg lecture of 2006 and predicting that the Corpus Coranicum would spark similar outrage among Muslims, comparing it to the punishment of Prometheus for bringing fire to mankind. He was enthusiastic that the fruits of their research might even "overthrow rulers and topple kingdoms". Marx promptly called the Al-Jazeera television network to deny any attempt to attack Islamic tenets.

Angelika Neuwirth demurred: "It would be quite wrong to claim triumphantly that we had found the key to the Quran and that Muslims for 14 long centuries had not." Instead, she and her colleagues have chosen a nonconfrontational approach that includes regular dialogue with the Islamic world and aims "to give the Quran the same attention as the Bible."

Michael Marx, Neuwirth and Nicolai Sinai spiritedly defended the project, writing that negative reaction to the papal speech should not be equated with Islamic hostility towards a historical-textual or philological approach to the Quran.

In discussions with Iranian, Arab and Turkish scholars in Tehran, Qom, Damascus, Fez, Rabat, Cairo and Istanbul Marx, Neuwirth and Sinai had contended that even if one considered the Quran as the literal words of God, a contextual reading as a legitimate subject of historical inquiry could create a climate of healthy inquiry and debate among Islamic and non-Islamic researchers alike. The trio's letter also pointed out that the Corpus Coranicum project was in any case not directed to Islamic fundamentalists, but to Germans and other Europeans.

== Collaborations and public outreach ==
=== Student Humanities Laboratory ===
In April 2008 the project "Academy and School" announced that the academy's "Student Humanities Laboratory" had created a teaching unit on Quranic research. Through the example of one of the shorter surahs, teenagers would explore the text through the tools of modern philology while experiencing it orally and through calligraphy as well, with the aim of increasing the students' curiosity and scientific interest in the humanities during their transition to university.
