= Gabriel Said Reynolds =

American historian of religion, theologian, and scholar of Islamic studies

Gabriel Said Reynolds is an American academic and historian of religion, who serves as Jerome J. Crowley and Rosaleen G. Crowley Professor of Theology and assistant professor of Islamic Studies at the University of Notre Dame. His scholarship focuses on Qur'anic Studies, Origins of Islam, and Muslim-Christian relations, and to a more limited extent, also covers World Religions, World Church, and History of Christianity.

== Biography ==
Gabriel Said Reynolds obtained his Ph.D. in Islamic Studies at Yale University. From 2012 to 2013, he directed "The Qurʾān Seminar" alongside Mehdi Azaiez, a year-long collaborative project dedicated to encouraging dialogue among scholars of the Quran, the acts of which appeared as The Qurʾān Seminar Commentary. In 2016–2017 he directed the research project Un Dieu de vengeance et de miséricorde: Sur la théologie coranique en relation avec les traditions juive et chrétienne at the Fondation Institut d'Études Avancées de Nantes in France. Reynolds is CEO of the International Qur’anic Studies Association (IQSA), and a contributor to Notre Dame's World Religions and World Church podcast: Minding Scripture.

In 2008 he was the editor for The Qur'an in its Historical Context; essays included his own introduction, "Qur'anic Studies and its Controversies". In August 2015 the Times Literary Supplement published Variant Readings: The Birmingham Qur'an in The Context of Debate on Islamic Origins, a scholarly commentary of Reynolds about the discovery and analysis of the Birmingham Quran and its relations with other ancient Quranic manuscripts. In 2018 he has overseen commentaries on such aspects of Islam as the Nephilim in The Qurʾān and the Bible: Text and Commentary. In 2020 he wrote Allah: God in the Qurʾān, a scholarly treatise on the conception of God in Islam and its distinguishing features in Islamic theology, with a comparison between the portrayals of the Abrahamic god in the Bible and the Quran, respectively.

== See also ==
- Ahmad Al-Jallad
- Michael E. Pregill
- Sean W. Anthony

== Publications ==
- Reynolds, Gabriel Said (2006). "ʿUthmān". In McAuliffe, Jane Dammen (ed.). Encyclopaedia of the Qurʾān. Vol. V. Leiden: Brill Publishers. doi:10.1163/1875-3922_q3_EQSIM_00439. ISBN 90-04-14743-8.
- Reynolds, Gabriel Said (2008). "Introduction: Qur'anic Studies and its Controversies". In Reynolds, Gabriel Said (ed.). The Qur'an in its Historical Context. London: Routledge. pp. 1–26. doi:10.4324/9780203939604. ISBN 978-0-415-42899-6. S2CID 160637821.
- Reynolds, Gabriel Said (May 2009). "The Muslim Jesus: Dead or Alive?" (PDF). Bulletin of the School of Oriental and African Studies (University of London). 72 (2). Cambridge: Cambridge University Press: 237–258. doi:10.1017/S0041977X09000500. JSTOR 40379003. S2CID 27268737. Archived (PDF) from the original on June 17, 2012.
- Reynolds, Gabriel Said (2009). "Reading The Qurʾan As Homily: The Case of Sarah's Laughter". In Marx, Michael; Neuwirth, Angelika; Sinai, Nicolai (eds.). The Qurʾān in Context: Historical and Literary Investigations into the Qurʾānic Milieu. Texts and Studies on the Qurʾān. Vol. 6. Leiden: Brill Publishers. pp. 585–592. doi:10.1163/ej.9789004176881.i-864.158. ISBN 978-90-04-17688-1. ISSN 1567-2808. S2CID 191038420.
- Reynolds, Gabriel Said (2009). "Angels". In Fleet, Kate; Krämer, Gudrun; Matringe, Denis; Nawas, John; Rowson, Everett K. (eds.). Encyclopaedia of Islam, THREE. Vol. 3. Leiden: Brill Publishers. doi:10.1163/1573-3912_ei3_COM_23204. ISBN 978-90-04-18130-4. ISSN 1873-9830.
- Reynolds, Gabriel Said, ed. (2010). The Qur'an and its Biblical Subtext. London: Routledge. doi:10.4324/9780203856451. ISBN 9780203856451. S2CID 170912874.
- Reynolds, Gabriel Said, ed. (2011). New Perspectives on the Qur'an: The Qur'an in its Historical Context 2. London: Routledge. doi:10.4324/9780203813539. ISBN 9780203813539. S2CID 193545147.
- Reynolds, Gabriel Said (2012). "David". In Fleet, Kate; Krämer, Gudrun; Matringe, Denis; Nawas, John; Rowson, Everett (eds.). Encyclopaedia of Islam, THREE. Vol. 3. Leiden: Brill Publishers. doi:10.1163/1573-3912_ei3_COM_25921. ISBN 978-90-04-22545-9. ISSN 1873-9830.
- Reynolds, Gabriel Said (2012). The Emergence of Islam: Classical Traditions in Contemporary Perspective. Minneapolis: Fortress Press. doi:10.2307/j.ctt22nm7qj. ISBN 9780800698591.
- Reynolds, Gabriel Said (April 2012). "ON THE QUR'ĀN AND THE THEME OF JEWS AS "KILLERS OF THE PROPHETS"" (PDF). Al-Bayan: Journal of Qur'an and Hadith Studies. 10 (2). Leiden: Brill Publishers: 9–32. doi:10.11136/jqh.1210.02.02. ISSN 2232-1969. S2CID 162290561. Archived (PDF) from the original on February 16, 2017.
- Reynolds, Gabriel Said (May 2013). "The Quran and the Apostles of Jesus". Bulletin of the School of Oriental and African Studies (University of London). 76 (2). Cambridge: Cambridge University Press: 209–227. doi:10.1017/S0041977X13000062. JSTOR 24692806. S2CID 171033234.
- Reynolds, Gabriel Said (2014). "Gabriel". In Fleet, Kate; Krämer, Gudrun; Matringe, Denis; Nawas, John; Rowson, Everett (eds.). Encyclopaedia of Islam, THREE. Vol. 3. Leiden: Brill Publishers. doi:10.1163/1573-3912_ei3_COM_27359. ISBN 978-90-04-26962-0. ISSN 1873-9830.
- Reynolds, Gabriel Said (2015). "The Islamic Christ". In Murphy, Francesca (ed.). The Oxford Handbook of Christology. Oxford: Oxford University Press. doi:10.1093/OXFORDHB/9780199641901.013.10. ISBN 9780199641901. S2CID 171135699.
- Azaiez, Mehdi; Reynolds, Gabriel Said; Tesei, Tommaso; Zafer, Hamza M. (2016). The Qur'an Seminar Commentary: A Collaborative Study of 50 Qur'anic Passages. Berlin: De Gruyter. doi:10.26530/oapen_626408. hdl:20.500.12657/31611. ISBN 9783110445909. S2CID 164817099.
- Reynolds, Gabriel Said (2016). "A Flawed Prophet? Noah in the Qurʾān and Qurʾanic Commentary". In Daneshgar, Majid; Saleh, Walid (eds.). Islamic Studies Today: Essays in Honor of Andrew Rippin. Texts and Studies on the Qurʾān. Vol. 11. Leiden: Brill Publishers. pp. 260–273. doi:10.1163/9789004337121_014. ISBN 978-90-04-33633-9. S2CID 165150752.
- Reynolds, Gabriel Said (June 2017). "Noah's Lost Son in the Qurʾān". Arabica. 64 (2). Leiden: Brill Publishers: 129–148. doi:10.1163/15700585-12341452. ISSN 1570-0585. JSTOR 26396237. S2CID 164648358.
- Reynolds, Gabriel Said (2017). "Moses, Son of Pharaoh: A Study of Qurʾān 26 and Its Exegesis". In Grundmann, Regina; Kattan, Assaad Elias; Pinggéra, Karl; Tamer, Georges (eds.). Exegetical Crossroads: Understanding Scripture in Judaism, Christianity, and Islam in the Pre-Modern Orient. Judaism, Christianity, and Islam – Tension, Transmission, Transformation. Vol. 8. Berlin: De Gruyter. pp. 289–302. doi:10.1515/9783110564341-014. ISBN 978-3-11-056114-2. S2CID 171560125.
- Reynolds, Gabriel Said (2018). The Qurʾān and the Bible: Text and Commentary. Translated by Qarai, Ali Quli. New Haven and London: Yale University Press. ISBN 978-0-300-18132-6. LCCN 2017952016. S2CID 211983625.
- Reynolds, Gabriel Said (2020). "Mary". In Fleet, Kate; Krämer, Gudrun; Matringe, Denis; Nawas, John; Rowson, Everett (eds.). Encyclopaedia of Islam, THREE. Vol. 6. Leiden: Brill Publishers. doi:10.1163/1573-3912_ei3_COM_36256. ISBN 978-90-04-41348-1. ISSN 1873-9830.
- Reynolds, Gabriel Said (2020). Allah: God in the Qurʾān. New Haven and London: Yale University Press. doi:10.2307/j.ctvxkn7q4. ISBN 978-0-300-24658-2. JSTOR j.ctvxkn7q4. LCCN 2019947014. S2CID 226129509.
- Reynolds, Gabriel Said (June 2020). "The Qurʾānic Doublets: A Preliminary Inquiry". Journal of the International Qur'anic Studies Association. 5 (1): 5–39. doi:10.5913/jiqsa.5.2020.a001. S2CID 251463824.
