= Abd Allah ibn Mas'ud =

Companion of the Islamic prophet Muhammad (c.594-c.653)

ʿAbd Allah ibn Mas'ud عبد الله بن مسعود
- Digital reproduction of calligraphy inscribed at the Prophet's Mosque honoring Abd Allah ibn Mas'ud

Personal life
- Born: c. 594 CE Mecca, Hejaz, Arabia
- Died: c. 653 (aged 58–59) Medina, Rashidun Caliphate (present-day KSA)
- Resting place: Al-Baqi', Medina
- Notable work(s): Expert in Tafsir, with interests in the Qur'an, Sunnah, Hadith and Tafsir
- Known for: Interpretation of the Qur'an, Prominent transmitter of hadith
- Other names: Abu Abd al-Rahman ابو عبد الرحمن
- Relations: Banu Hudhayl (tribe)

Religious life
- Religion: Islam

Muslim leader
- Influenced by: Muhammad
- Influenced: Hanafis, Future Theologians, and Hadith Scholars

Abd Allah ibn Mas'ud (Arabic: عبد الله بن مسعود, romanized: ʿAbd Allāh ibn Masʿūd; c. 594 – c. 653) was a companion of the Islamic prophet Muhammad whom Sunni Islamic tradition regards as the greatest interpreter of the Quran of his time and the second ever. He was also referred to as the kunya Abu Abd al-Rahman.

== Early years ==
Abd Allah ibn Mas'ud was born in Mecca in about 594, a son of Mas'ud ibn Ghafil and Umm Abd bint Abd Wadd, both of whom were from the Hudhayl tribe,

Abd Allah had a brother, Utba, and at least one wife in Muhammad's lifetime. A craftswoman who supported Abd Allah and their child through her hand-crafts. She was Zaynab bint Abd Allah from the Thaqif tribe with whom he had several daughters. Some people called her also Rayta bint Abd Allah. Based on authentic hadiths, both Rayta and Zaynab was the same woman, referto Abd Allah's age and his age of marriage due to his difficult economy. He specified in his will that none of his daughters should be married off without their own knowledge. He also had a son named Abd al-Rahman.

He is described as a thin, short man with very dark skin, and smooth hair reaching his shoulders. Abd Allah wore white clothes, and could be recognized in the dark by his distinctive, high-quality perfume. He was reported to be sociable and willing to speak out to put people at ease. In his character and goals, he was said to be the person "most like Muhammad".

== Conversion to Islam ==
Ibn Masʿūd was an early follower of Islam, having converted before 616. He appears nineteenth on Ibn Ishaq's list of people who were converted by Abu Bakr.

As a youth, he worked as a shepherd for Uqba ibn Abu Mu'ayt, one of the principal adversaries of Islam. He first met Muhammad and Abu Bakr while watching his flocks when they were "fleeing from the idolators". They asked him for milk, but Abd Allah said he could not steal from his employer. According to Masʿūd, Muhammad then asked for an unmated ewe and stroked its udder, whereupon milk poured out. Abd Allah immediately asked to be taught "some of these words", and Muhammad began to teach him the Qur'an. Abd Allah later said that he learned 70 surahs from Muhammad.

Later his mother and brother also converted to Islam.

Around 614 the Quraysh began a campaign to suppress Islam through the oppression of Muslims of lower social status. Abd Allah, as a foreigner whose allies had withdrawn their protection, was vulnerable to this persecution. Abu Jahl—one of the high-status leaders among the Quraysh—once "clawed at him and punched him".

The Muslims remarked one day that the Quraysh had never heard the Qur'an being recited clearly, and that someone needed to make them listen to it. Abd Allah volunteered. His friends reminded him that he had no protector and therefore the crowds might attack him, but Abd Allah replied, "Allah will protect me." He stood in front of the Kaaba and began to recite Surah Ar-Rahman from the Qur'an. When the Quraysh realised that he was reciting Muhammad's teaching, they began to hit his face, but he continued to recite. He returned to the Muslims with the bruises on his face, saying, "I have never despised Allah's enemies more than I do now, and if you like I will go and do the same thing tomorrow." The Muslims told him that he had already done enough, "for you have made them listen to what they don't want to hear".

Abd Allah and his brother Utba were among those who emigrated to Abyssinia in 616. Abd Allah returned to Mecca in 619 with Abd al-Rahman ibn Awf.

== Emigration to Medina ==
When the Muslims emigrated to Medina in 622, Abd Allah lodged with Muadh ibn Jabal or Saad ibn Khaythama. One tradition states that Muhammad made a pact of brotherhood between Abd Allah and Muadh ibn Jabal; but according to another, Abd Allah's brother in Islam was al-Zubayar ibn Al-Awwam. When land in Medina was allocated to the immigrants, the Zuhra clan was given an area behind the mosque, which included plots for Abd Allah and his brother Utba.

=== Relationship with Muhammad ===
Outsiders perceived Abd Allah and his mother as members of Muhammad's household. He worked as a personal servant, taking care of Muhammad's bedding, toothbrush, sandals and travelling hygiene. "He used to screen him when he bathed and wake him when he slept and walk with him in a wild land." He was said to be the "keeper of secrets". Muhammad once told him to climb a tree and bring him a twig. The companions laughed at how thin Abd Allah's legs were. Muhammad said: "Why are you laughing? Abd Allah's foot will be heavier than Mount Uhud in the scales on the Day of Resurrection."

Muhammad recognized Abd Allah as one of the four foremost experts on the Qur'an. He once asked him to recite; when Abd Allah protested, "Should I recite it to you when you are the one to whom it was sent down and revealed?" Muhammad replied, "I love to hear it from someone else." Abd Allah then recited it until Muhammad wept.

=== Military career ===
Abd Allah fought at the Battle of Badr. After the battle, Muhammad ordered the warriors to search among the corpses for his enemy Abu Jahl, who could be recognised by a distinctive scar on his knee.

Abd Allah found Abu Jahl Amr "at his last gasp" with his leg cut off. He seized his beard and asked, "Are you Abu Jahl?" Abu Jahl replied, "Can there be a man superior to the one you have killed or one whom his own folk has killed?" Abd Allah then placed his foot on Abu Jahl Amr's neck, and asked, "Allah's enemy, has Allah put you to shame?" Abu Jahl Amr replied, "How has he shamed me? Am I anything more than a man whom you have killed? Tell me how the battle went." Abd Allah told him that the Muslims had won. Abu Jahl Amr responded, "You have climbed high, you little shepherd!" Then Abd Allah struck off his head. He brought it to Muhammad, proclaiming, "This is the head of Allah's enemy Abu Jahl!".

Abd Allah also fought at the Battle of Uhud, the Battle of the Trench and "all the battles", including Tabuk. Twenty years later, he said he wished he had died at Tabuk.

== Caliphates of Abu Bakr and Umar ==
After the death of Muhammad, Abd Allah ibn Mas'ud became the eighth-most prominent transmitter of hadith with a total of 848 narrations. Umar called him "a box full of knowledge". The following traditions are among those attributed to him.

I asked Allah's Messenger which deed was the best. He replied: "Prayer at its appointed hour." I said: "Then what?" He replied: "Kindness to the parents." I said: "Then what?" He replied: "Jihad in the cause of Allah." And I would not have ceased asking more questions but out of regard.

A man said: "Allah's Messenger, which offence is the most grievous in Allah's eye?" He replied: "That you associate a partner with Allah, who created you." He said: "What next?" He replied: "That you kill your child out of fear that he would join you in food." He said: "What next?" He replied: "That you commit adultery with your neighbour's wife." And the Almighty and Exalted Lord testified it: All those who call not unto another god along with Allah, and slay not any soul which Allah has forbidden, except in the cause of justice, nor commit fornication, and he who does this shall meet a requital of sin. [ Qur'an 25:68]

We were along with Allah's Messenger at Mina, that moon was split up into two. One of its parts was behind the mountain and the other one was on this side of the mountain. Allah's Messenger said to us: "Bear witness to this."

Umar allotted Abd Allah a pension of 6,000 dirhams, and he was said to be very generous with his money. His mother was also granted a pension of 1,000 dirhams.

Around 642 Umar appointed him as a preacher, treasurer and magistrate (qāḍī) in Kufa, saying: "I have preferred you with him over myself, so take him."

== Conflict with the Government ==
Abd Allah, in his capacity as treasurer, lent a sum of money to Saad ibn Abi Waqqas, the Governor of Kufa, and when he was unable to repay it, they quarrelled. Their quarrel spread to their individual supporters until they became two "wrangling factions" in the city. Uthman became angry with both of them; in 646 he recalled Saad, extracted the money from him, and replaced him with al-Walid ibn Uqba. He thought of replacing Abd Allah too, but in the end he decided against it.

By 650, Abd Allah had quarrelled with al-Walid. A petition was brought to Abd Allah to investigate rumours that al-Walid was drinking alcohol; Abd Allah responded that it was not his business to spy on another man's privacy. Al-Walid felt that this statement was tantamount to a suspicion of his guilt. He accused Abd Allah of not defending his reputation, and they insulted one another verbally. Al-Walid also tried to misappropriate state finances, but Abd Allah refused to comply with his demands. When Uthman instructed Abd Allah to obey al-Walid in everything, Abd Allah resigned his post. However, he remained in Kufa and continued to criticise the Governor.

Another long-serving Muslim, Abu Dharr al-Ghifari, was also living in Kufa. He lived in the desert of Al-Rabadha. Sometime later, Abd Allah ibn Mas'ud went on a pilgrimage to Mecca. As he passed through al-Rabadha, his camels almost trod upon a funeral bier. A slave told him that it was the funeral of his master Abu Dharr al-Ghifari, who had died alone. Abd Allah burst into tears, exclaiming: "The apostle was right! You walked alone, you died alone and you will be raised alone!" Then he alighted from his camels and helped to bury his old friend.

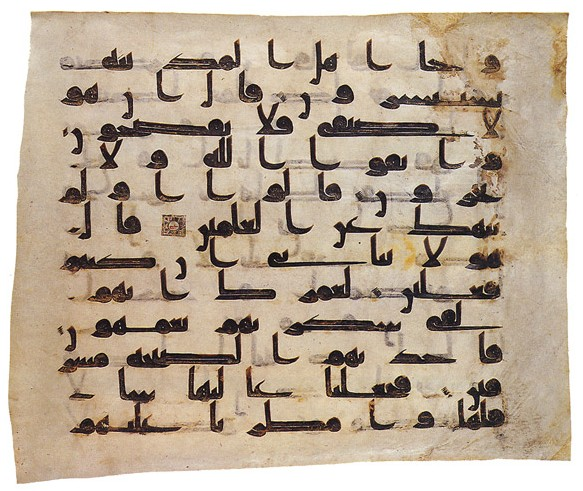
Uthman Qur'an.

== Uthman's Compilation of Qur'an ==
Uthman produced a standardised version of the Qur'an in 652. He sent a copy to each province, and ordered that all other Quranic materials "whether written in fragmentary manuscripts or whole copies", must be burned.

It is said that Ibn Mas’ud was displeased by the finished product; in particular:

- That he accused Uthman's scribes of adding three extra suras (1, 113 and 114) that had never been part of the original, and of making many other small changes to the text.
- That he preached a sermon in Kufa in which he called Uthman's standardised Quran a "deceit". "And whoever deceives like this will bring his deceit on the Day of Resurrection ... I like it better to read according to the recitation of him whom I love than that of Zayd ibn Thabit ... If I knew anyone to be more conversant with Allah's Book than I am, I would surely go to him if camels could carry me there."

When Uthman's agents came to Kufa to burn all the variants, Abd Allah hid his copy from them. He justified his own version of the recitation by reminding people: "I recited before Allah's Messenger more than seventy suras of the Qur'an. His Companions know that I have a better understanding of Allah's Book than they do; and if I were to know that someone had a better understanding than I have, I would have gone to him." It was said that nobody could find fault with Abd Allah's version.

When Uthman was called to account for his mismanagement as Caliph, one of the grievances against him was that he had destroyed variant readings of the Qur'an. Much later, Abd Allah ibn Masud's variant readings were discussed on equal terms with the Uthmanic text by al-Farra (d. 207/822).

The Qur'an says in 15:87 "We have given thee seven of the oft-repeated (verses) and the great Qur'an." The seven often-repeated verses refer to al-Fatihah, the first sura of the Qur'an, which Abd Allah ibn Mas'ud is alleged to have denied. However, quoting Ibn Jarir al-Tabari, Ibn adh-Dhurays, Ibn al-Munzar and Ibn Mardwiyah, Al-Suyuti narrated the following:

It is narrated from Abd Allah ibn Mas'ud, regarding the word of Allah, "We have given you the seven oft-repeated verses;" he said, "[It is] Fatihatu al-Kitab."

In another narration, Abd Allah ibn Mas'ud was asked why he did not write al-Fatihah in his mushaf. He replied, "If I were to write it, I would write it before every sura." Abu Bakr al-Anbari explains this saying every raka’a (in prayers) starts with al-Fatiha and then another sura is recited. It is as if Ibn Masud said, "I have dropped it for the sake of brevity and I have trusted its preservation by Muslims (collectively)."

There are also narrations from Abd Allah where he explicitly refers to suras 113 and 114 as surahs, for example: "Excessively recite two surahs. Allah will make you reach higher ranks in the Hereafter because of them. They are al-Mu'awwidhatayn (i.e. al-Falaq and an-Nas/nos. 113 & 114)..."

Four qira'at of the Qur'an (Qira'at of Hamzah, 'Aasim, Khalaf, Al-Kisa'i) have chains of transmission (isnad) going through Abd Allah ibn Mas'ud, and they all include the above three suras. These are mutawatir chains and thus Islamic scholars give precedence to them, disregarding much weaker chains that go against it as inauthentic.

For these reasons, Islamic scholars rejected the notion of Abd Allah ibn Mas'ud rejecting suras. Al-Nawawi says: "The Muslims have all agreed that al-Mu'awwidhatayn and al-Fatihah are part of the Qur'an and whoever denies this becomes a disbeliever and whatever is quoted from Ibn Masud in this regard is not true." Ibn Hazm also rejected the notion of Ibn Masud denying these suras, along with the vast majority of Islamic scholars.

== Conflict with Uthman ==
Uthman recalled Abd Allah to Medina. He walked into the mosque, where Uthman was speaking, but the Caliph broke off his speech to insult Abd Allah. Aisha then interrupted with protests against this manner of speech "to a companion of Allah's Messenger". Uthman forbade Abd Allah ever to leave Medina again and ordered him out of the mosque. His servants removed Abd Allah so violently that they broke two of his ribs and, amid loud protests from Aisha, he had to be carried home.

Uthman did not pay Abd Allah's pension for the rest of his life.

== Reading of the Qur'an in Kufa ==
Ibn Masʿūd read one of the most well documented "companion" readings of the Qur'an, which he taught in Kufa. The non-canonical Kufan reciter Sulaiman al-Aʽmash (d. 147 / 765), who continued the Ibn Masʿūd tradition in parts of his own reading, narrated that "I came to Kufa and the qirāʾa of Zayd was not amongst them, except as the reading ofʿAbd Allāh is amongst you today: no one recited it save one or two men". Ramon Harvey asserts that Ibn Masʿūd's reading continued in use and was even taught as the dominant reading in Kufa for at least a century after his death and has shown that some of his distinctive readings continued to play a role in Hanafi fiqh.

Ibn Masʿūd's reading played a greater or lesser role in each of the canonical Kufan readings. Professor Shady Nasser notes that the isnad of ʿĀṣim back to the Prophet passes through two main branches. One of these goes through Ibn Masʿūd via Zirr b. Hubaysh.

The influence of Ibn Masʿūd is greater in the canonical readings of Hamza and his student Al-Kisa'i. Hamza learned his reading primarily from his fellow Kufans Ibn Abī Laylā, and Al-A'mash, insofar as the latter's was compatible with the Uthmanic rasm. Al-A'mash derived much of his reading from that of Ibn Masʿūd.

From numerous sources Arthur Jeffery compiled the hundreds of differences in the reading of Ibn Mas'ud (as well as other companions) compared to the textus receptus, namely the Cairo edition, which is based on the reading of Hafs from 'Asim. Many of these differences were reported by Al-A'mash and appear in Ibn Abi Dawud's Kitab al Masahif. Data is also available showing the extent to which Ibn Masʿūd's reading occurs in the Kufan canonical readings in terms of distinctive dotting of consonants.

Codex Mashhad is an early Qur'an manuscript which has been identified as originally using the surah order reported by early sources from the codex of Ibn Masʿūd, though with a standard Uthmanic rasm text. Its surahs were subsequently re-ordered to the standard sequence, but enough evidence remained for the original to be reconstructed.

== Death ==
Abd Allah ibn Mas'ud died in Medina in 653 and was buried by the night at Al-Baqi'. It is disputed whether it was Ammar ibn Yasir or Caliph Uthman who led his funeral prayers. He left a fortune of 90,000 dirhams. Al-Zubayr ibn al-Awam petitioned the Caliph to give Abd Allah's pension to his heirs "because they need it more than the treasury does". Uthman granted this request, although the exact value of the pension is disputed.

== See also ==
- List of Sahabah
- 7th century in Lebanon § Ṣaḥāba who have visited Lebanon

== Bibliography ==
- Nöldeke, Theodor; Schwally, Friedrich; Bergsträsser, Gotthelf; Pretzl, Otto (2013). "The Genesis of the Authorized Redaction of the Koran under the Caliph ʿUthmān". In Behn, Wolfgang H. (ed.). The History of the Qurʾān. Texts and Studies on the Qurʾān. Vol. 8. Translated by Behn, Wolfgang H. Leiden and Boston: Brill Publishers. pp. 251–275. doi:10.1163/9789004228795_017. ISBN 978-90-04-21234-3. ISSN 1567-2808.
