= Quranic studies =

Academic discipline

Quranic studies is the academic study of the Quran, the central religious text of Islam. Like in biblical studies, the field uses and applies a diverse set of disciplines and methods, such as philology, textual criticism, lexicography, codicology, literary criticism, comparative religion, and historical criticism.

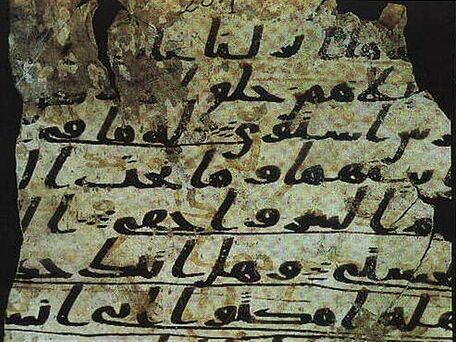
A fragment showing part of Surat Ta-Ha; The Sanaa palimpsest is one of the oldest Quranic manuscripts in existence. The most comprehensive and oldest Quranic text, containing subtext that some researchers say points to the textual development of the Quran.

Quranic studies has three primary goals. The first goal is to understand the original meaning, sources, history of revelation, and the history of the recording and transmission, of the Quran. The second is to trace how the Quran was received by people, including how it was understood and interpreted (exegesis), throughout the centuries. The third is a study and appreciation of the Quran as literature independently of the other two goals.

== Historical-critical method ==
Quranic studies employs the historical-critical method (HCM) as its primary methodological apparatus. The HCM is an approach that "delays any assessment of scripture's truth and relevance until after the act of interpretation has been carried out". A common misconception about the term "critical" is that it implies criticizing a text. Instead, in the HCM, to read a text critically means:

to suspend inherited presuppositions about its origin, transmission, and meaning, and to assess their adequacy in the light of a close reading of that text itself as well as other relevant sources ... This is not to say that scripture should conversely be assumed to be false and mortal, but it does open up the very real possibility that an interpreter may find scripture to contain statements that are, by his own standards, false, inconsistent, or trivial. Hence, a fully critical approach to the Bible, or to the Qur’an for that matter, is equivalent to the demand, frequently reiterated by Biblical scholars from the eighteenth century onwards, that the Bible is to be interpreted in the same manner as any other text.

By contrast, to read a text historically would mean to:

require the meanings ascribed to it to have been humanly ‘thinkable’ or ‘sayable’ within the text's original historical environment, as far as the latter can be retrospectively reconstructed. At least for the mainstream of historical-critical scholarship, the notion of possibility underlying the words ‘thinkable’ and ‘sayable’ is informed by the principle of historical analogy – the assumption that past periods of history were constrained by the same natural laws as the present age, that the moral and intellectual abilities of human agents in the past were not radically different from ours, and that the behaviour of past agents, like that of contemporary ones, is at least partly explicable by recourse to certain social and economic factors.

== Textual criticism ==
Today, the field of applying the methods of textual criticism to the Quran is still in its infancy. The most significant development in recent years has been the digitization of early Quran manuscripts. In the same timeframe, the study of Quran manuscripts has also picked up.

=== Companion codices ===
When Muhammad, the authoritative source of divine revelation among his followers (known as his Companions) died, it became necessary for the Companions to collect his teachings into a single authoritative document so that they would not be lost. Collections of his teachings were written down into codices, a type of document that is the ancestor of the modern book. The unit of division of these Quran codices was the surah, which is roughly equivalent to a chapter in a book today. The most important collection was the Uthmanic codex, which received its name due to it being canonized during the reign of the caliph Uthman around 650 AD, at which point it became the authoritative written codification of the Quran in Islam. Before this event, other Companions of Muhammad had also created their own, slightly different codices of the Quran. In Islamic history, codices have been attributed to Abdullah ibn Masud, Ubayy ibn Ka'b, and Abu Musa al-Ash'ari.

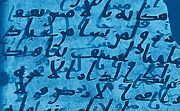
A page from the Sanaa manuscript — the oldest and most comprehensive Islamic archaeological document to date.

The codex of Ibn Mas'ud and the codex of Ubayy ibn Ka'b are well understood, because they survived up until the eleventh century, and many Islamic authorities described their variants in detail. By contrast, very little is known about the codex of Al-Ash'ari. No manuscript of any of these texts has survived up until the present day, although the evidence that they once existed is strong enough that it has widely convinced historians. In addition to the description of these codices by several authorities in different times and regions, the discovery of the Sanaa manuscript, which is independent of the Uthmanic codex, has provided concrete manuscript evidence for a Quran that contains variants attributed to the codices of the Companions.

The main difference between the codices of Uthman and Ibn Mas'ud is that the codex of Ibn Mas'ud did not include Surah al-Fatihah, or the final two surahs of the Uthmanic codex (Al-Falaq and Al-Nas), known as the Al-Mu'awwidhatayn ("The Two Protectors"). The codex of Ubayy includes all the surahs of the Uthmanic codex, but it also possesses another two beyond them.

=== Canonization ===
Tradition holds that the Quran was canonized by the caliph Uthman around 650 AD, which immediately became the standard Quran. In recent decades, a new controversy has emerged over the timing of this canonization event, and whether it took place during the time of Uthman or under a later caliph. Behnam Sadeghi and Mohsen Goudarzi classify members of the field into four camps on this issue: traditionalists, revisionists, skeptics, and neo-traditionalists. Traditionalists accept the traditional account of the formation of the Quran (canonized under Uthman, by a committee headed by Muhammad's companions, with codices being produced and sent out to regional centers to replace any alternatives). Revisionists hold that canonization either happened later, or that it did not prevent substantial additional revisions afterwards. The skeptics ("de facto revisionists") are simply agnostic about the historicity of the traditional accounts. Neo-traditionalists accept the main details of the traditional account, but do so on the basis of critical historiography and not a trust of traditional sources.

Recent radiocarbon, orthographic, and stemmatic analyses Quranic manuscripts converge on an early canonization event (during the reign of Uthman, as opposed to Abd al-Malik, the most commonly cited alternative) and that copies of the canonized text were sent to Syria, Medina, Basra, and Kufa.

In the decades after the canonization, a "rasm literature" emerged whereby authors sought to catalogue all variants that existed in copies or manuscripts of the Quran that descended from the Uthmanic standard. Among the most important of these include the Kitab al-Masahif by Abī Dāwūd (d. 929) the al-Muqni' fi Rasm al-Masahif by al-Dānī (d. 1052–1053). Such works, though, due to their lateness, do not reflect a number of the consistent variants in the earliest manuscripts.

=== Variants / Readings of the Qur'an ===
Because the Uthmanic Quran did not standardize the dotting of the skeletal Arabic text (the rasm), variant ways to do this emerged in different cities. These different styles of dotting (and correspondingly, recitation) are called qirāʾāt ("readings"). Prominent reciters developed their own readings starting as early as the first half of the early 8th century. Ultimately, while many of these were created, only seven were canonized by Ibn Mujahid (d. 936) in the 10th century, these being known as the seven readers. Three readings were chosen from Kufa, and one each from Mecca, Medina, Basra, and Damascus. The reading of each teacher was independently attested through two transmissions, called a riwāyah (pl. riwāyāt), these typically being direct students. A century later, Al-Dani canonized two specific transmitters for each of the eponymous readers. In the 15th century, Ibn al-Jazari (d. 1429) canonized three more readers, giving us the modern ten recitations. Although variation between these is largely in the dotting, a few differences occur also with the rasm of Uthman, especially in Abu Amr's reading. Most variants only affect the form of the word, but a minority also impact the meaning. Common variants are dialectical, or concern noun formation, the singular versus plural, different verb stems, etc. Today, the reading of Hafs through Asim is the most popular in the Muslim world, having been canonized in the 1924 Cairo edition.

Recent studies indicate that there is a common oral ancestor to all the canonical (and likely also non-canonical) readings that dates to the seventh century, after the reign of Uthman.

=== Print editions ===
The Cairo edition, published in Egypt in 1924, is the dominant print edition of the Quran today. It follows the Hafs reading. Earlier but lesser-known print editions also once existed, including the Hinckelmann edition, Marracci edition, both from the late 17th century, and notably the Flugel edition, established in 1834 and remaining in use until the Cairo. Most physical copies of the Quran are high resolution prints of an originally handwritten Quran by a calligrapher, but this too is derived from the Cairo edition. The orthography of the Cairo edition is largely faithful to what is found in seventh-century manuscripts, although not entirely:

This is especially the case for the use of letter ʾalif, which is used to write the ā significantly more often in modern print editions than is typical for early manuscripts. But there are also several other innovative orthographic practices compared to early manuscripts. For example, the nominative pronoun ḏū is consistently spelled و ذ in modern print editions, while in early manuscripts it is consistently followed by an ʾalif, ا و ذ .

So far, no critical edition of the Quran exists. The creation of one is the major goal of the Corpus Coranicum project has, though so far, it has focused on publishing text editions of early manuscripts.

== Possible origins of the Quran ==
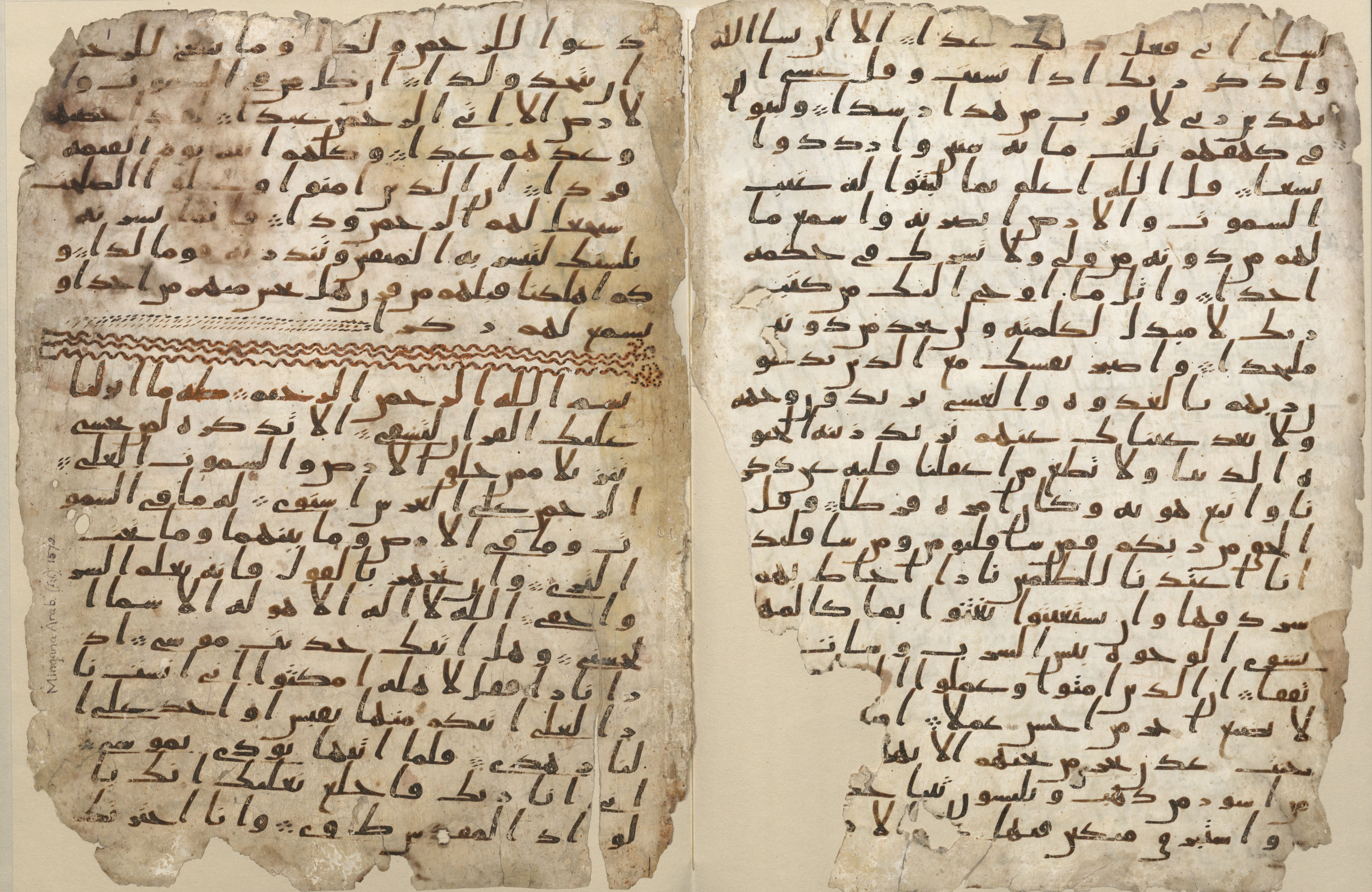
The Birmingham Quran manuscript, an early Quran manuscript dated to the seventh century.

=== Authorship ===
There is an ongoing debate as to whether the Quran reflects single or multiple authorship. Behnam Sadeghi was the first to address this debate based on stylometric analysis, from which he concluded there was one author. Based on his study of Quranic doublets, Gabriel Said Reynolds argued for multiple authorship, and that the Quran was a composite creation of two originally separate works correlating to the Meccan and Medinan surahs. Tesei similarly favors multiple authorship based on two primary stylistic clusters of surahs. Employing redaction criticism, Michael Pregill has argued that the Quran was weaved together from three sources.

=== Geography ===
==== Hejaz ====
Most historians accept a Hejazi origin for the Quran, following a long-standing consensus that goes back to the 19th century. According to Angelika Neuwirth, the Hejazi position is supported by the latest manuscript, philological, and historical studies.

Hejazi proponents argue that pre-Islamic Arabian Christianity was widespread enough to account for the Qurans familiarity with Christian tradition. Hejazi proponents also question why an origin of the Quran or Muhammad outside of the Hejaz would later have been unanimously retrojected by Islamic tradition into Mecca and Medina, without any trace of the original view or any other competing views from any texts. Taken further, this argument asserts that a non-Hejazi origin would require a conspiratorial level of forgery to maintain. Recent research has also established a major role played by Arabian tradition in the formation of the content of the Quran, such as the presence of Arabian words, prophets, etc. Proponents also argue that many of the toponyms in the Quran are Hejazi, and that the Constitution of Medina (widely accepted as authentic) also indicates a Hejazi origin:

It has often been noted that the Qur’an ‘has little concern with the proper names of its own place and time’ (Reynolds 2010: 198; see also Robin 2015a: 27–8), which, I think, makes it all the more significant that it does mention a handful of Ḥijāzī toponyms, including Badr (Q. 3:123), Ḥunayn (Q. 9:25), Yathrib (Q. 33:13), and Mecca (Q. 48:24)—this last notably in close conjunction with al-masjid al-ḥarām, ‘the sacred place of worship’, which appears in the following verse—as well as the tribe of Quraysh (Q. 106:1). Furthermore, the so-called ‘Constitution of Medina’, which is widely accepted as a genuinely early (i.e. start of the first-/seventh-century) document preserved in two third-/ninth-century Arabic works, does place a ‘Prophet’ (nabī) and a ‘Messenger of God’ (rasūl Allāh) called Muḥammad in a place called Yathrib (Lecker 2004).

Recent studies also show the Arabic dialect of the Quran is Hejazi and that the Quran uses spelling forms of Arabic words only known in the pre-Islamic Hejaz.

==== Outside of the Hejaz ====
During the 1970s and 80s, several historians (including John Wansbrough and Gerald Hawting) argued that the Quran originated outside of Arabia. The leading argument for this was that the Christian traditions the Quran knows of are more likely to have been learned in Mesopotamia or the Levant instead of Arabia. In Hagarism by Patricia Crone and Michael Cook, the Quran is kept in Arabia, but in its northwest instead of the Hejaz. Stephen J. Shoemaker places Muhammad's life and career in the Hejaz, but the redaction and editing of the Quran in the Levant during the reign of the caliph Abd al-Malik. Guillaume Dye believes the Quran may be a composite text of traditions originating from many parts of Arabia, including but not limited to the Hejaz.

== Historical context ==
The environment that the Quran was composed in, its historical context, is believed to have played an important role in shaping it. The study of the historical context of the Quran emerged as an important area of study in the 19th century, but eventually reached a pause from the mid-20th century and until the beginning of the 21st century. The debate was reinvigorated by Christoph Luxenberg's book The Syro-Aramaic Reading of the Koran, which asserted that the Quran started out as an Aramaic book. This work was universally rejected but stimulated historians to reconsider what they knew about the Qurans historical context. Major scholars of this area now include Gabriel Said Reynolds, Holger Zellentin, Emran El-Badawi, and Joseph Witztum.

=== Syriac ===
One of the dominant paradigms in current historical context research is to situate the Quran into the milieu of Syriac Christianity, especially amongst the works of authors like Ephrem the Syrian, Jacob of Serugh, and Narsai. The first major work in this area was a PhD thesis by Josephu Witzum titled The Syriac Milieu of the Qurʾan. Stories in the Quran that historians believe reflect stories in Syriac Christian literature include the story of Dhu al-Qarnayn (Surah 18:83-100) with its background in the Syriac Alexander Legend, the story of the Seven Sleepers (18:9-25), and many of the stories of prophets in the Quran.

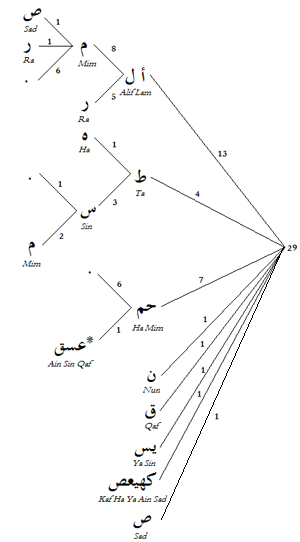
A tree diagram of the mysterious Qur'anic initial letters, C. Luxenberg sees that some parts of the Quran are connected with the Syriac hymns and says that these letters are remnants (abbreviations of the introductory words) of these hymns. Hamiduddin Farahi attaches letters, Nun (ن) "fish" symbolizing Jonah, and Ta (ط) representing serpent of Moses and serpents.

=== Rabbinic ===
The Quran has numerous references to Jews (yahūd/allādhīna hādū), Israelites (banū isrāʾīl) and the People of Scripture (ahl al-kitāb), indicating an intimate knowledge with Judaism in pre-Islamic Arabia. Since the pioneering work of Abraham Geiger, the content of the Quran has been compared regularly to rabbinic traditions in the Mishnah and Talmud. For example, Quran 5:32 has a quotation of Mishnah Sanhedrin 4:5. Quran 2:63 reflects a story from b. Shabbat 88a where a mountain is raised above the Israelite's as they establish a covenant with God. Many other narrative and legal comparisons have also been made.

=== Arabian ===
Recent years have revived interest in the pre-Islamic Arabian context, especially in light of many new discoveries of pre-Islamic Arabian inscriptions. Such finds show that Judaism, Christianity, and monotheism in pre-Islamic Arabia were much more common than previously believed, if not dominant, in the fifth and sixth centuries. It has been noted that the "associationists" (mushrikūn) in the Quran guide intercessory prayer to intermediate divine beings, while believing in Allāh as the singular omnipotent Creator being. Pre-Islamic Arabic poetry also largely lacks polytheistic invocations.

Archaeological work has shown that the Quranic spelling of the name Jesus, Īsā, reflects earlier developments of Arabic spelling as seen in Safaitic inscriptions. Furthermore, this work has shown that the Quran was written in the Hejazi dialect of Paleo-Arabic. There is great ritual continuity between the Quran and pre-Islamic Arabian religion, including in the practices of pilgrimage (ḥajj, ʿumra), prayer (ṣalāh), and charity (zakāh). In terms of pilgrimage, comparisons have been drawn between the way pilgrimage was practiced in the Kaaba (one of several pre-Islamic Kaabas) with how it was practiced in a major South Arabian temple known as the Temple of Awwam. Black stones believed to be of heavenly or meteorite origins were popular in Arabia.

=== Greek ===
There is significant evidence of Hellenization in pre-Islamic Arabia, including in parts of the Hejaz. Trends in Hellenization have concurrently been related to the Quran. In 2014, Omar Sankharé published what is still the only book-length investigation of the subject, in his volume Le Coran et la culture grecque. He studied the Quran vis-a-vis Greek literary descriptions of the flood, the legend of Korah, the triad of female intercessory beings mentioned in Quran 53:19–23, the story of Alexander the Great so-named as Dhu al-Qarnayn, the Surah of the Cave and Plato's Republic, and more. Others have related Quranic to Hellenistic notions of time. Individual studies have also focused on the following elements:

- Cole has demonstrated a notable overlap between Quranic law, like Surah Al-Ma'idah (5), and late Roman law, like the Corpus Juris Civilis codified during the reign of Justinian I.
- Expressions such as being "dyed by the dye of God" (Quran 2:138) also echoes a widespread phrase, found from the Republic to late antiquity.
- The story of Jesus' birth in relation to the palm tree has also been related to a tradition witnessed in the Gospel of Pseudo-Matthew, ultimately going back further still to a reworking of traditions surrounding Leto's labor.
- The figure of Luqman in Quran 31 has been related by some to the Greek philosopher Alcmaeon of Croton.
- Quran 52:24 has been related by Walid Saleh to Ganymede.

=== Jewish Christian ===
It has long been argued that the Christians of the Quran reflect a Jewish Christian milieu, argued first by Aloys Sprenger in his Das Leben und die Lehre des Moḥammad (1861). Other prominent supports of this view since have included Adolf von Harnack, Hans-Joachim Schoeps, M. P. Roncaglia, and most recently, Francois de Blois and Holger Zellentin in his work comparing Quranic legal discourse to the Syriac version of the Didascalia Apostolorum and the Clementine literature. This view also has several critics, most notably Sidney Griffith. In recent years, this view has also been rejected by Gabriel Said Reynolds, Stephen J. Shoemaker, and Guillaume Dye.

De Blois provides three arguments for the role of Jewish Christianity. First, the term for "Christians" in the Quran (naṣārā) resembles the name of the Nazoreans sect, who were Jewish Christians. Second, that the Gospel of the Hebrews offers a background for the Quranic depiction of Mary as part of the Trinity. Third, dietary restrictions associated with the Christian community in the Quran and Jewish Christianity. In turn, Mehdy Shaddel argued that a possible relationship between the terms naṣārā and Nazoreans may have arisen if Nazoreans were the first to interact with the Arabic community, but it does not help characterize Christian communities in the time of Muhammad. The Quran may be using hyperbole when it refers to Mary being in the Trinity. Shaddel concedes, however, that ritual laws are evidence for the Jewish Christian hypothesis.

== History of the field ==
=== Premodern predecessors ===
While formal works on Quranic studies had not emerged until multiple centuries after the death of Muhammad, key topics were addressed within other disciplines earlier own. Early exegetical works (tafsīr) included discussions on asbāb al-nuzūl (occasions of authorship), qirāʾāt (readings), and linguistic nuances. Jurists incorporated interpretations of Qurʾānic verses into legal reasoning, while grammarians analyzed the text for its syntactic and phonological features. By the 10th century, early independent treatises began addressing the sciences of the Qurʾān. Figures like Muḥammad ibn Khalaf al-Marzubān (al-Ḥāwī fī ʿUlūm al-Qurʾān) and others compiled extensive discussions on topics such as abrogation, ambiguous verses, and linguistic peculiarities. These works were often encyclopedic however, incorporating earlier scholarship and organizing it into coherent frameworks.

Al-Suyūṭī’s al-Itqān fī ʿUlūm al-Qurʾān expanded on al-Zarkashī’s framework, identifying 80 sciences and incorporating discussions on previously neglected areas. Al-Suyūṭī emphasized the interdisciplinary nature of Qurʾānic studies, linking linguistic analysis, legal theory, and spiritual reflection. His work became a cornerstone of Arabic-language Quranic studies literature.

=== Modern Quranic studies ===
The modern discipline of studying the Quran may be considered to have begun in 1833, with the publication of the book Was hat Mohammed aus dem Judenthume aufgenommen? (‘What Did Muhammad Take Over from Judaism?’) by Abraham Geiger. The primary objective of this book was to demonstrate that the Quranic reception of biblical narratives did not occur directly via a reception of the books of the canonical Bible, but through parabiblical intermediaries such as midrash (traditional Jewish exegesis of biblical texts). Geiger, being a rabbinic scholar, focused on the Qurans correspondence with the Jewish literary tradition. This approach continued in the works of Hartwig Hirschfeld, Israel Schapiro, and others, before finally culminating in Heinrich Speyer's Die biblischen Erzählungen im Qoran, published in 1931. This mode of scholarship however came to an end with World War II, when a mass of Jewish academics were dispersed from Nazi Germany, and the primary contributors transitioned to working in adjacent areas of research. During this period, a different but smaller school of research emphasizing the influence of Christian texts (prominently including Tor Andrae); while research on pagan influences was not entirely absent from this time, it was comparatively severely understudied. In recent years, a trend that has been called the "New Biblicism" or "Syriac Turn" of Quranic studies has emerged, refocusing on the intertextuality of the Quran with a much greater attention paid to Christian intertexts. The current paradigm of research was initiated by Christoph Luxenberg; though his thesis was universally rejected among academics, it generated considerable new interest in studying the Quran in light of its historical context. The primary historians of this new wave of scholarship have included Gabriel Said Reynolds, Holger Michael Zellentin, Emran El-Badawi, and Joseph Witztum.

In 1844, Gustav Weil published the first critical introduction to the Quran in Europe, with a second edition in 1878. The work was titled Einleitung in den Koran. This work succeeded an earlier book three-part book of his which treated the subjects of Muhammad, the Quran, and then Islam. In 1858, French Académie des Inscriptions announced a European-wide competition for a work on the history of the Quran. Three people jointly won: Theodor Noldeke, Aloys Sprenger, and Michele Amari. While Amari's work was never published, that of Sprenger and Amari would become foundational publications in the emerging field of Quranic studies.

In 1860, Noldeke published his thesis as a book titled Geschichte des Qorans (History of the Quran). Subsequent editions of the book were published by Friedrich Schwally, Gotthelf Bergsträsser, and Otto Pretzl between 1909 and 1938. This work had a major influence and, for a significant time, resulted in a consensus among Western scholars that the Quran reflected the preaching of Muhammad in Mecca and Medina, and that it should be chronologically periodized into four main types of surahs: Meccan surahs, which were divided into Early Meccan, Middle Meccan, and Late Meccan surahs, followed by Medinan surahs. Noldeke also accepted a canonization event during the reign of the third caliph, Uthman. (These views have been categorized by some as the "Noldekian paradigm". One of the first to question this paradigm was Hartwig Hirschfeld in his 1902 work New researches into the composition and exegesis of the Qoran.) As for Sprenger, his work was published in 1861–65 in three volumes under the title Das Leben und die Lehre des Mohammad, nach bisher größtenteils unbenutzten Quellen. Both Noldeke and Sprenger owed much to the Al-Itqan fi Ulum al-Qur'an of Al-Suyuti which had summarized hundreds of works of the medieval Islamic tradition. Other important publications from this early time included the Die Richtungen der Islamischen Koranauslegung of Ignaz Goldziher, which founded the critical study of the tafsir (commentary, exegesis) of the Quran and the Materials For The History Of The Text Of The Quran The Old Codices by Arthur Jeffrey in 1934.

=== After WW2 ===
After World War II, there was no primary locus for the study of the Quran. The major scholars from this time period, including Arthur Jeffrey, W. Montgomery Watt, William Graham, Rudi Paret, and others, thought it best to treat the Quran as Muslims do (as sacred) and so avoided discussion of its relationship with earlier Jewish and Christian literature. In light of this, decrials of research that focused on the origins of the Quran, efforts towards promoting Christian-Muslim dialogue, the move to read the Quran in light of traditional exegesis instead of earlier tradition, the disbandment of the primary locus of Quranic research in Germany after the war, and other reasons, the study of the historical context of the Quran would descend into obscurity for the remainder of the twentieth century, until being revived by the turn of the twenty-first century.

During this period, many works from this time sought to foster good relations with Muslims; for example, Johann Fück wrote works about the originality of Muhammad. In addition, growing attention was paid to the tafsir (in which important progress was made) in part to avoid thorny critical issues surrounding the Quran and Muhammad. This continued well into the twentieth century, the latter period of which was best characterized by the works of Andrew Rippin, Jane McAullife, and Brannon Wheeler (as in his book Moses in the Quran and Islamic Exegesis). Books that critically appraised traditional sources concerning the origins of the Quran only began to appear in the 1970s, starting with the revisionist writings of Günter Lüling (1974), John Wansbrough (1977), and Patricia Crone and Michael Cook (1977). Though the theses advanced in these books were rejected, they resulted in a considerable diversity of new perspectives and analyses.

The present phase of Quranic studies began in the 1990s and, since then, the field has witnessed an explosion of interest and popularity. This has coincided with the formation of new journals such as the Journal of Qur'anic Studies, societies such as the International Qur'anic Studies Association (IQSA), and the publication of major resources like The Encyclopaedia of the Quran (2001–6). 2007 saw the initiation of the Corpus Coranicum project, led by Angelika Neuwirth, Nicolai Sinai, among others. In 2015, the publication of the Study Quran by HarperCollins included an English translation of the text, accompanied by a massive collection of traditional interpretations for each verse from a total of several dozen Islamic exegetes.

Despite the progress, there is still significant work to do in the field. For example, a critical edition of the Quran, which has been available for the Bible for decades, is still unavailable, despite an effort towards producing one in the first half of the twentieth century that was cut short by the second world war. Only one critical translation of the Quran has so far been published, by Arthur Droge in 2014.

== Notable publications ==
- The Foreign Vocabulary of the Qur'an, 1938
- A Concordance of the Qurʾān, 1983.
- Encyclopaedia of the Qurʾān, Vols 1–5, 2001–2006
- A Concise Dictionary of Koranic Arabic, 2004
- The Integrated Encyclopedia of the Qurʾān (IEQ) by the Center for Islamic Sciences
- The Qur'an: An Encyclopedia, 2006
- The Cambridge Companion to the Qur'an, 2006
- Dictionnaire du Coran, 2007
- The Wiley-Blackwell Companion to the Qur’an, 2017
- The Qur’an: A Historical-Critical Introduction, 2018
- The Oxford Handbook of Qur'anic Studies, 2020
- The Routledge Companion to the Qur'an, 2021
- Key Terms of the Qur'an, 2023

== Commentaries ==
=== English ===
- Azaiez, Mehdi et al. The Qur'an Seminar Commentary / Le Qur'an Seminar, De Gruyter 2016.
- Bell, Richard. A Commentary on the Quran, Vols 1–2, 1991.
- Nasr, Seyyed et al. The Study Quran: A New Translation and Commentary, HarperCollins 2015.
- Neuwirth, Angelika. The Qur'an: Text and Commentary. Volume 1, Early Meccan Surahs: Poetic Prophecy, Oxford University Press 2022.
- Neuwirth, Angelika. The Qur'an: Text and Commentary, Volume 2.1: Early Middle Meccan Suras: The New Elect, Oxford University Press 2024.
- Reynolds, Gabriel Said. The Qur'an and the Bible: Text and Commentary, Yale University Press 2018.
- Sirry, Mun'im. The Quran with Cross-References, De Gruyter 2022.

=== German ===
- Khoury, Adel Theodor. Der Koran. Arabisch-Deutsch. Übersetzung und wissenschaftlicher Kommentar, 2001.
- Neuwirth, Angelika:
  - Bd. 1: Frühmekkanische Suren, 2011.
  - Bd. 2/1: Frühmittelmekkanische Suren, 2017.
  - Bd. 2/2: Spätmittelmekkanische Suren, 2021.
- Paret, Rudi. Der Koran, Kommentar und Konkordanz, 1963.

=== French ===
- Azaiez, Mehdi et al. The Qur'an Seminar Commentary / Le Qur'an Seminar, De Gruyter 2016.
- Dye, Guillaume & Mohammad Ali Amir-Moezzi. Le Coran des historiens, Vols 1–3, Éditions du Cerf 2019.

== Academic journals ==
- Arabica
- Der Islam
- Jerusalem Studies in Arabic and Islam
- Journal of Qur'anic Studies
- Journal of the International Quranic Studies Association (JIQSA)

== See also ==
- Hadith studies
- Historiography of early Islam
- History of the Quran
- Islamic studies
- Quranic cosmology
- Quranic counter-discourse
- Literary interpretation of the Quran
