= Nicolai Sinai =

German scholar of the Qur'an

- Born: 1976 (age 49–50)
- Education: University of Leipzig; Free University of Berlin; University of Cairo
- Occupation: Quranic studies scholar
- Employer: University of Oxford
- Known for: Historical and literary study of the Qur'an
- Awards: Fellow of the British Academy

Nicolai Sinai (born 1976) is a German scholar of Quranic studies. He is a professor of Islamic studies at the University of Oxford as well as a Fellow of Pembroke College and the British Academy.

Sinai's work explores the historical, literary, and exegetical dimensions of the Qur'an, including its engagement with Jewish and Christian traditions, as well as pre-Islamic Arabic poetry, and its Late Antique Arabian context. He also studies Islamic exegesis (tafsīr) and scriptural hermeneutics, alongside the history of philosophical and theological thought in the Islamic world.

== Biography ==
=== Education ===
Sinai studied Arabic and philosophy at the University of Leipzig, the Free University of Berlin and the University of Cairo. He received his doctorate in Arabic studies from the Free University of Berlin in 2007.

=== Career ===
Sinai worked as a researcher on the Corpus Coranicum project at the Berlin-Brandenburg Academy of Sciences and Humanities from 2007 to 2010. Since 2011, he has taught Islamic studies at the University of Oxford, successively as lecturer, associate professor and professor. In 2023, he was elected a Fellow of the British Academy.

== Selected works ==
- Der Koran. Eine Einführung [The Qur'an. An Introduction]. Edinburgh University Press. 2017.
- The Qur'an: A Historical-Critical Introduction. Edinburgh University Press. 2018.
- Rain-giver, bone-breaker, score-settler: allāh in Pre-Quranic poetry. Lockwood Press. 2019.
- Key Terms of the Qur'an: A Critical Dictionary. Princeton University Press. 2023.

== See also ==
- Holger Michael Zellentin
- Mohsen Goudarzi
- Sean Anthony
- Walid Saleh
