= Ahmed El Shamsy =

Professor of Islamic thought

Academic background
- Education: Harvard University

Ahmed El Shamsy is a professor of Islamic thought at the University of Chicago.

== Biography ==
El Shamsy received his Ph.D. in 2009 from Harvard University. His works examine the historical development of classical Islamic disciplines and academic culture. His studies focus on orality and literacy, the history of the book, and the theory and practice of Islamic law. He has been at the University of Chicago since 2010.

== Works ==
- El Shamsy, Ahmed (December 2025). "Bibliography After Empire: Documenting and Classifying Knowledge in the Tenth-Century Muslim World". Papers of the Bibliographical Society of America. 119: 399–422.
- El Shamsy, Ahmed (2020). Rediscovering the Islamic Classics: How Editors and Print Culture Transformed an Intellectual Tradition. Princeton, NJ: Princeton University Press. ISBN 9780691174563.
- El Shamsy, Ahmed (2013). The Canonization of Islamic Law: A Social and Intellectual History. New York: Cambridge University Press. ISBN 9781107041486.

== See also ==
- Behnam Sadeghi
- Walid Saleh
