= Bazargan chronology =

Bazargan chronology refers to an ordering of chapters in the Quran according to the sequence of revelation. It is named after Iranian scholar Mehdi Bazargan who enunciated the chronology in 1976 by publication of his landmark work Sayr-i taḥawwul-i Qurʾān.

This chronology is based on statistical procedure, and suggests that roughly half of the chapters, which is 55 out of a total of 114, consisted of collections of proclamations from various time periods. Bazargan proposed that the length of verses tended to grow continuously over time, without reverting, and based on this concept, he reorganized 'blocks'. In Bazargan chronology, 114 chapters of the Quran are divided into 194 blocks, keeping some as complete single blocks while splitting others into two or more blocks. These blocks are then reorganized roughly according to increasing average verse length. This sequence is suggested to represent the chronological order, with the underlying assumption that the Quran's style, as indicated by verse length, evolved gradually. It is emphasized that this proposed chronology should not be seen as absolute, as it is based on statistical analysis, which offers strong conclusions about averages of collections rather than individual elements.

== See also ==
- Geschichte des Qorāns
- Tanzil
