= Angelika Neuwirth =

German academic of the Quran

Angelika Neuwirth FBA
- Born: 4 November 1943 (age 82); Nienburg
- Occupation: Professor

Academic background
- Education: Universities of Berlin, Tehran, Göttingen, Jerusalem, Munich

Academic work
- Discipline: Qur’anic Studies
- Sub-discipline: Order in Qur’anic Chapters
- Doctoral students: Nicolai Sinai

Angelika Neuwirth FBA (born 4 November 1943) is a German Islamic studies scholar and Professor of Qur’anic studies at the Free University of Berlin.

== Education ==
Born in Nienburg, Lower Saxony, she studied Islamic studies, Semitic studies and classical philology at the Universities of Berlin, Tehran, Göttingen, Jerusalem, and Munich.

== Career ==
Neuwirth is also the director of the research project Corpus Coranicum. Between 1994 and 1999, she was the director of the German Institute of Oriental Studies in Beirut and Istanbul. She currently works as a professor in Freie University in Berlin and as a visiting professor at the University of Jordan in Amman, and her research focuses on the Qur'an, its interpretations, and modern Arabic literature in the Eastern Mediterranean, especially Palestinian poetry and prose related to the Arab-Israeli conflict.

== Awards ==
In 2011 she was named an honorary member of the American Academy of Arts and Sciences, and in 2012 was granted an honorary doctorate from Yale University's Department of Religious Studies. In June 2013, the Deutsche Akademie für Sprache und Dichtung awarded her its Sigmund Freud Prize for her research on the Qur'an. In July 2018 she was elected as a Fellow of the British Academy.

== Publications ==
- Neuwirth, Angelika (2007). "Orientalism in Oriental Studies? Qur'anic Studies as a Case in Point". Journal of Qur'anic Studies. 9 (21): 115–127. doi:10.3366/e1465359108000119. JSTOR 25728259.
- Neuwirth, Angelika (2008). "Two Views of History and Human Future: Qur'anic and Biblical Renderings of Divine Promises". Journal of Qur'anic Studies. 10 (1): 1–20. doi:10.3366/e1465359109000217. JSTOR 25728268.
- Neuwirth, Angelika (2010). Der Koran als Text der Spätantike: Ein europäischer Zugang. Berlin: Insel Verlag. ISBN 978-3-458-71026-4. English translation: Neuwirth, Angelika (2019). The Qur'an and Late Antiquity: A Shared Heritage. Oxford: Oxford University Press. ISBN 978-0-19-992895-8.
- Neuwirth, Angelika; Sinai, Nicolai; Marx, Michael (2010). The Quran in context: historical and literary investigations into the Quranic milieu. Leiden: Brill. ISBN 978-90-04-17688-1.
- Neuwirth, Angelika (2014). Scripture, Poetry and the Making of a Community: Reading the Qur'an as a Literary Text. Oxford: OUP. ISBN 978-0-19-870164-4.
- Neuwirth, Angelika (2011). Band 1: Frühmekkanische Suren. Poetische Prophetie. Berlin: Insel Verlag. ISBN 978-3-458-75981-2.
  - English translation: Volume 1: Early Meccan Suras. Poetic Prophecy.
- Neuwirth, Angelika (2017). Band 2/1: Frühmittelmekkanische Suren. Das neue Gottesvolk. Berlin: Insel Verlag. ISBN 978-3-458-70039-5.
  - English translation: Volume 2.1: Early Middle Meccan Suras. The New People of God.

== See also ==
- Nicolai Sinai
- Sean Anthony
