= Christoph Luxenberg =

Islamic studies scholar

Unknown
- Writing career
- Pen name: Christoph Luxenberg
- Language: German
- Genres: Non-fiction, Islam
- Notable work: The Syro-Aramaic Reading of the Koran

Christoph Luxenberg is the pseudonym of the anonymous author of the 2000 book The Syro-Aramaic Reading of the Koran and several articles about philology, textual criticism and exegesis in the study of the Quran and early Islam. The real identity of the person behind the pseudonym remains unknown. The most widely circulated version claims that he is a German scholar of Semitic languages.

Luxenberg claims to have chosen a pseudonym "upon the counsel of Arab friends, after these became familiar with my work theses," to protect himself against possible violent repercussions. Asked if he feared a fatwa such as was issued against Salman Rushdie, Luxenberg replied "I am not a Muslim, so I don’t run that risk. Besides, I haven’t offended against the Koran". Nevertheless he elected to use a pseudonym as "some enthusiastic fundamentalist [might] act of his own initiative".

== Biography ==
Luxenberg has worked as a scholar, researcher, teacher and translator in Germany, including at German universities. His work focused on Semitic philology, classical Arabic, Syriac and other dialects. Luxenberg's doctoral thesis was on a Syriac manuscript of the 8th and 9th century that discussed homilies such as those of Jacob of Serugh from the 5th and 6th centuries that were often originally in Greek. Through comparison, Luxenberg realised that the translation from Greek into Syriac was often very literal and thus difficult to comprehend and reconstruct. The original Greek of one such reconstructed text, of which the original could not be found, was attributed by Luxenberg to Severus of Antioch. A Jesuit scholar from Rome later discovered a manuscript in Damascus that confirmed Luxenberg's conjecure. These experiences informed Luxenberg's theory about the language of the Quran.

Ibn Warraq spent several months working with Christoph Luxenberg.

== Speculation on identity ==
The pseudonym "Christoph Luxenberg" may be a play upon the name of Georg Christoph Lichtenberg, the "destroyer of myths," since Lux (Latin) translates as Licht (German), 'light'.

Holger Zellentin speculates the pseudonym is perhaps meant as a self-conscious trilingual pun highlighting "the book's Christian apologetic and polemical message". The first part would refer to Saint Christopher meaning "bearer of Christ" in Greek (Χριστόφορος). The second would refer to "light" in Latin (lux). And the third part means "mountain" in German (Berg). Together these might invoke the idea of Christ placed on a mountain to enlighten humanity. ^{:17}

François de Blois (2003) criticizes the The New York Times' attempt to compare Luxenberg with Salman Rushdie, Naguib Mahfouz and Suliman Bashear, because De Blois claims to have information that Luxenberg is not German but rather a Lebanese Christian. There is thus no reason "to avoid the death threats of rabid Muslim extremists" and Luxenberg has no right "to conceal his (or her) identity". De Blois also posits that Luxenberg has an articulate knowledge of dialectal Arabic, passable (though flawed) command of classical Arabic, and "knows enough Syriac so as to be able to consult a dictionary" and that it is impossible that Luxenburg is a professional scholar.

Federico Corriente (2004) in a review critical of Luxenberg's book, qualifies him as: "a very knowledgeable scholar endowed with an active and provocative mind, who has devoted considerable time and effort in an interesting attempt to cast light on an abstruse subject, surrounded by scientific and other perils. As stated above, he appears to have hit the mark at times, although his personal convictions and professional preferences have not contributed to keep him in the middle of the road or let him avail himself of all the extant data, even those which he probably knows well but has preferred to discard."^{:314}

== Books ==
=== The Syro-Aramaic Reading of the Koran (2000) ===
In the 2000 book The Syro-Aramaic Reading of the Koran: A Contribution to the Decoding of the Language of the Koran Luxenberg proposes a new theory and method to interpret the Quran's text which is expanded on in later articles. Luxenberg argues that the Quran's language is a hybrid of Arabic and Syriac and that the Quran was originally a lectionary that borrowed for its content from Syriac Christianity.

== Articles ==
The articles by Luxenberg build on the same basic approach established in the 2000 book.^{:377}^{:165}

=== Christmas and the Eucharist in the Qur'an (2003) ===
In the 2003 article "Weihnachten im Koran", published in English in 2013, Luxenberg argues that several Quranic suras relate to Christmas and the Eucharist and have their origin in pre-Islamic Syriac Christian strophic hymns.

In the traditional account Sura 97 (Al-Qadr) verse 1 refers to the night the entire Quran was sent down. But Luxenberg argues the vocabulary used "is strongly reminiscent of the Biblical description of the birth of Christ" and refers rather to the coming down of the Word of God as Christ. Furthermore, the word “shahr” in verse 3 is better read "sahr", corresponding to Syriac "shahra" meaning "night vigil". This verse thus reads: "Christmas night is better than a thousand night vigils" ^{:17} Sura 96 (Al-Alaq) is reinterpreted not as the first revelation to the Prophet but as a liturgical preface calling the faithful to prayer and to the Eucharist — reading the final word iqtarib not as "draw near" (to God) but as deriving from the Syriac ܐܬûøܒ (eṯqarraḇ) "to receive Communion". In Surah 108, the traditionally enigmatic term al-Kawthar is reinterpreted not as a river of paradise but as referring to perseverance in prayer, with connections drawn to 1 Peter 5:8-9.

==== Discussion ====
Guillaume Dye (2019) writes that Luxenberg created "convincing results, or [...] stimulating avenues of inquiry" in his studies of Suras 97 and 108.^{:768} Furthermore, Dye supports the way Luxenberg reinterpreted Suras 97 and links it to a Christian hymn. Ibn Warraq (2014) summarises this as follows:

"[Dye] builds on Luxenberg’s insights on Sura 97, submitting it, with patience and analytical brilliance, to the most thorough examination imaginable, suggesting every possible objection to Luxenberg’s thesis, and then answering those objections. Dye thereby strengthens Luxenberg’s position. Finally, he clinches the argument by proposing a Syriac text as the direct inspiration for Surah 97, namely Hymns on the Nativity by Ephrem the Syrian."^{:370}

=== New Interpretation of the Arabic Inscription in the Dome of the Rock in Jerusalem (2005) ===
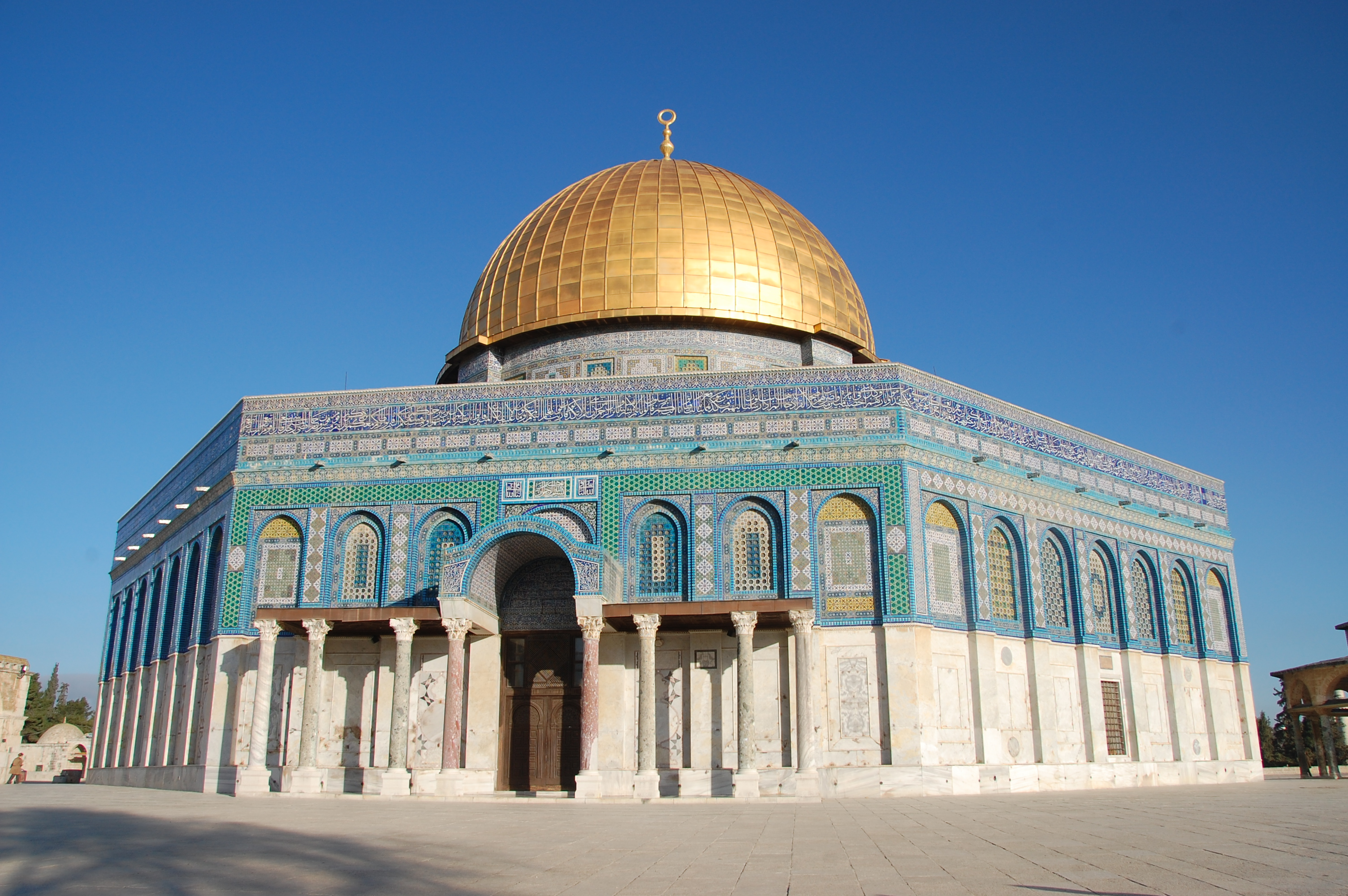
The Dome of the Rock is the earliest religious structure built by a Muslim ruler.

In the 2005 article "Neudeutung der arabischen Inschrift im Felsendom zu Jerusalem", published in English in 2010, Luxenberg argues for a re-interpretation of the name Muhammad in an inscription on the inner side of the octagon of the Dome of the Rock.^{:125} The Dome contains one of the earliest epigraphic mentions of the prophet Muhammed with the phrase “Muhammad is the servant of God and His messenger”. The rasm MHMD underlying “Muhammad” is understood by Luxenberg not as a proper name but reinterpreted in the sense of “praised be”. The inscription thus reads “Praised be the servant of God and His messenger” which fits in the surrounding context as a Christian anti-Trinitarian statement referring to Jesus, thus observing strict monotheism.^{:173} This reading also conforms to Quran Sura 19:30 in which infant Jesus begins his discourse with the phrase inni ʿabdu llāhi (I am the servant of God).^{:198}

Gabriel Reynolds further explains: "Luxenberg argues that the phrase muhammadun ʿAbdu Llāhi wa-rasūluhu [Muhammad is the servant of Allah and His Messenger] should be read parallel to the Christian Arabic liturgical proclamation (derived from Matthew 21.9, itself a quotation of Psalm 118.25–6), mubārakun al-ātī bi-smi l-rabbi [Blessed is the one who comes in the name of the Lord], and applied to Jesus".^{:198}

Jan van Reeth (2012) agrees with Luxenberg that "the name Muḥammad may very well be a title, given to the Prophet by his already ḥanafī family, pointing to a prophetic function, similar to that of the “first” Paraclete Jesus, without saying however that the Prophet Muḥammad would be an entirely fictitious, invented personality . . . In other words: Muḥammad has been in the strict sense (according to Gil’s understanding of the term) a ḥanīf, that is to say one of the electi and so he has been entrusted with the fullness of the divine message, as possessing the entire prophetical Spirit, the ‘Spirit Paraclete’ as Aphrahat would have said".^{:451-2}

Van Reeth furthermore laments that Luxenberg "has been led astray" by speculations such as those of K.H. Ohlig, into believing that Muhammad is not an actual living, historical person. However, Ibn Warraq states that this does not accurately reflect Luxenberg's position: "Though he does hint that Muhammad, the Prophet of Islam, may only be a symbolic figure, Luxenberg is far from being dogmatic on this issue, pointing out that the historicity of Muhammad is 'a task for the historians.' Luxenberg does not claim to be a historian, and he is very careful in his choice of words".^{:360}

=== Relics of Syro-Aramaic Letters in Early Qurʾānic Codices of the ḥiǧāzī and kūfī Style (2007) ===
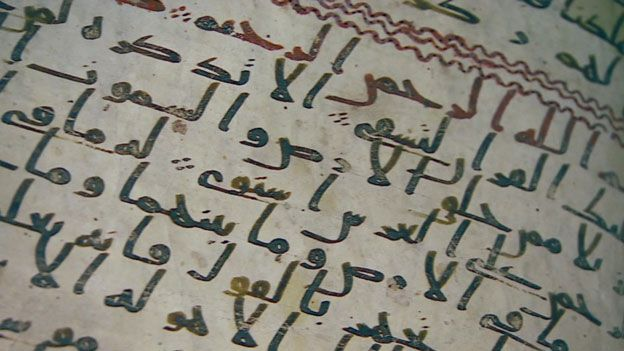
The Hijazi style Birmingham manuscript of which BNF 328a is a part.

In the article "Relikte syro-aramäische Buchstaben in frühen Korankodizes im ḥiğāzī und kūfī-Duktus", originally published in German in 2007 and published in English, revised and expanded, in 2014, Luxenberg attempts to provide empirical proof from early Quran manuscripts for his theory that a proto-Quran was initially written in Syriac script (Garshuni).^{:579} Through philological analysis Luxenberg identifies four groups of letters from the Syriac and Arabic alphabets that were misread or mistranscribed for appearing similar.^{:548-9}

- In the Syriac serto script the letters ܕ (d) and ܪ (r) are the only letters distinguished with a dot above or below. It appears that inexperienced copyists made frequent mistakes when transcribing these into the Arabic د (d), ذ (ḏ), ر (r), ز (z) and the similarly formed و (w).^{:549}
- The similar shape of the Syriac letters ܠ (l) and ܥ ('ayn) has sometimes resulted in the former being mistranscribed as the Arabic عــ ('ayn) and the latter as the Arabic لـــ (l).^{:549}
- By far the most frequently occurring confusion is between the Arabic final letters ن (n) and ى (y and mater lectionis for ī or ā), which Luxenberg argues actually originates in a faithful (but later forgotten) transcription into Arabic of the Syriac final letter ܢ or ܢܢ (n).^{:562}
- Some cases of the Syriac letter ܣ (s) being mistranscribed into the Arabic ھــ (h).^{:549}

Corroborating evidence is provided through visual analysis of four early Quran codices: three in Hijazi script (BNF 328a, MS Or. 2165 and Sanaa) and one in Kufic script (Samarkand).^{:562}

=== No Polygamy and No Concubinage in the Koran (2008) ===
In the 2008 article "Keine Polygamie und kein Konkubinat im Koran (Sure 4:3)", Luxenberg offers a Syro-Aramaic reinterpretation of the first three verses of Sura 4 (al-Nisāʾ, "The Women") which have traditionally been understood as permitting Muslim men to marry up to four wives and to take concubines. Luxenberg suggests verse 4:3 is concerned exclusively with the just treatment of orphans and their property, continuing the theme established in verse 4:2. Thus, verse 4:3 instructs a man to marry up to four widowed mothers of orphans only if this is intended to provide justice and security for the (female) orphans. Hereby this Sura is echoing Isaiah 1:17 which calls to defend orphans and widows.

=== Syriac Liturgy and the “Mysterious Letters” in the Qur’ān (2008) ===
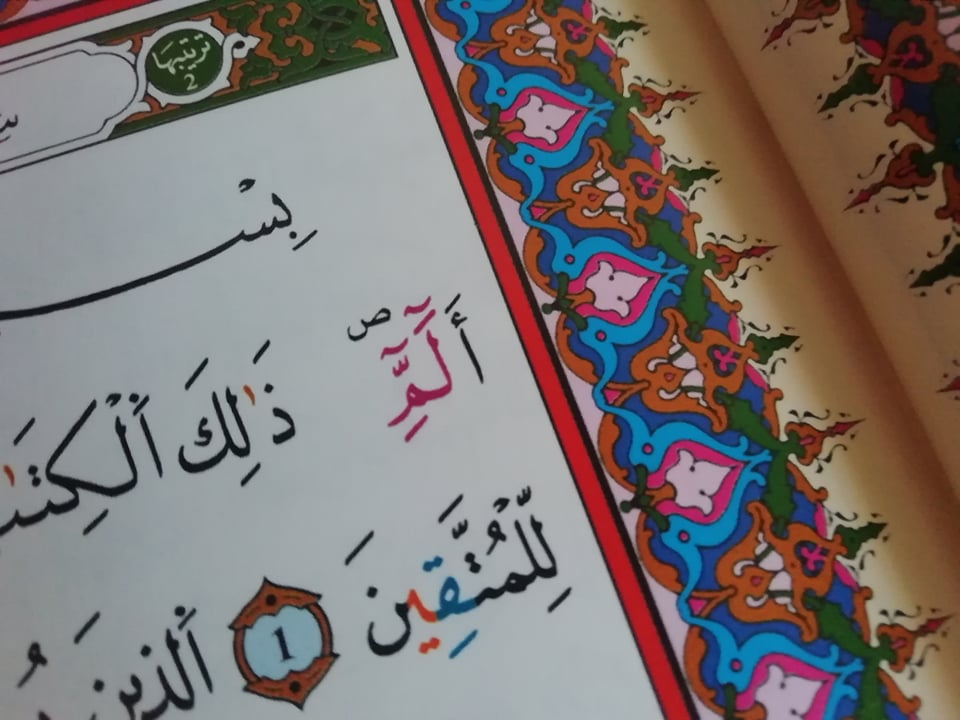
In the center the three mysterious letters of Surah Al-Baqarah: Alif ا, Lam ل, and Mim م (right-to-left). Luxenberg relates these to a Syriac abbreviation for the proclamation "The Lord spoke to me".^{:534}

In the 2008 article "Die syrische Liturgie und die ‘geheimnisvollen Buchstaben’ im Koran. Eine liturgievergleichende Studie", published in an expanded form in English in 2014, Luxenberg argues that the Muqattaʿat are originally Syriac liturgical abbreviations or sigla serving as recitation cues for Christian hymns and lectionary readings. He reinterprets ʾlm as a marker related to the reading of the Syriac Evangelion Gospel, ʾlmr and ʾlms as variants indicating specific pericopes or hymn sections, ḥm as referring to a "hymn" (ḥimna or similar liturgical term), ṭsm and ṭs as cues for "psalm" or "canticle" readings, khyʿṣ (in Surah 19) as an abbreviation connected to "lection" or "prophecy" (keryana or ḥadya), and other combinations such as ys, q, ṣ, and ṭh as technical indicators for different strophes, responses, or sections in the underlying Syro-Aramaic liturgical collection.

Guillaume Dye (2017) considers Luxenberg's interpretation of the so-called mysterious letters "a sensible hypothesis" and suggests that they might also represent traces of bilingual "alterance (shift from one language to the other)".

=== No Mecca (Makka) or Bakkah in the Quran: On Suras 48:24 and 3:96 (2012) ===
In the article "Kein ‘Mekka’ (Makka) und kein ‘Bakka’ im Koran: Zu Sure 48:24 und 3:96: Eine philologische Analyse" published in two parts in 2012, Luxenberg argues that the two references in the Quran to Mecca (alternatively in the form of Bakkah) are erroneous interpretations.

In Sura 48:24, he rejects the traditional reading of "fī baṭni Makka" as “in the valley of Mecca”. Luxenberg reads this contextually and philologically with baṭn interpreted as “in the midst” and with Makka interpreted via the Syriac root m'ak meaning “to press, struggle”. The verse then says God restrained both sides “in the midst of a clash”.

In Sura 3:96, he rejects the traditional reading of "bi-Bakkata" as "Bakkah". This must be a misreading of the Quranic rasm, because "bi-Bakkata" is a prepositional phrase, while the surrounding syntax requires a verb. Luxenberg proposes two alternative readings through altered diacritics, neither of which refer to a place name:^{:360}

1. Using the Syriac tyk it becomes: “the house which he enclosed as a blessed sanctuary”.
2. Using the Syriac bnk it becomes “the house which he established as a blessed sanctuary.”

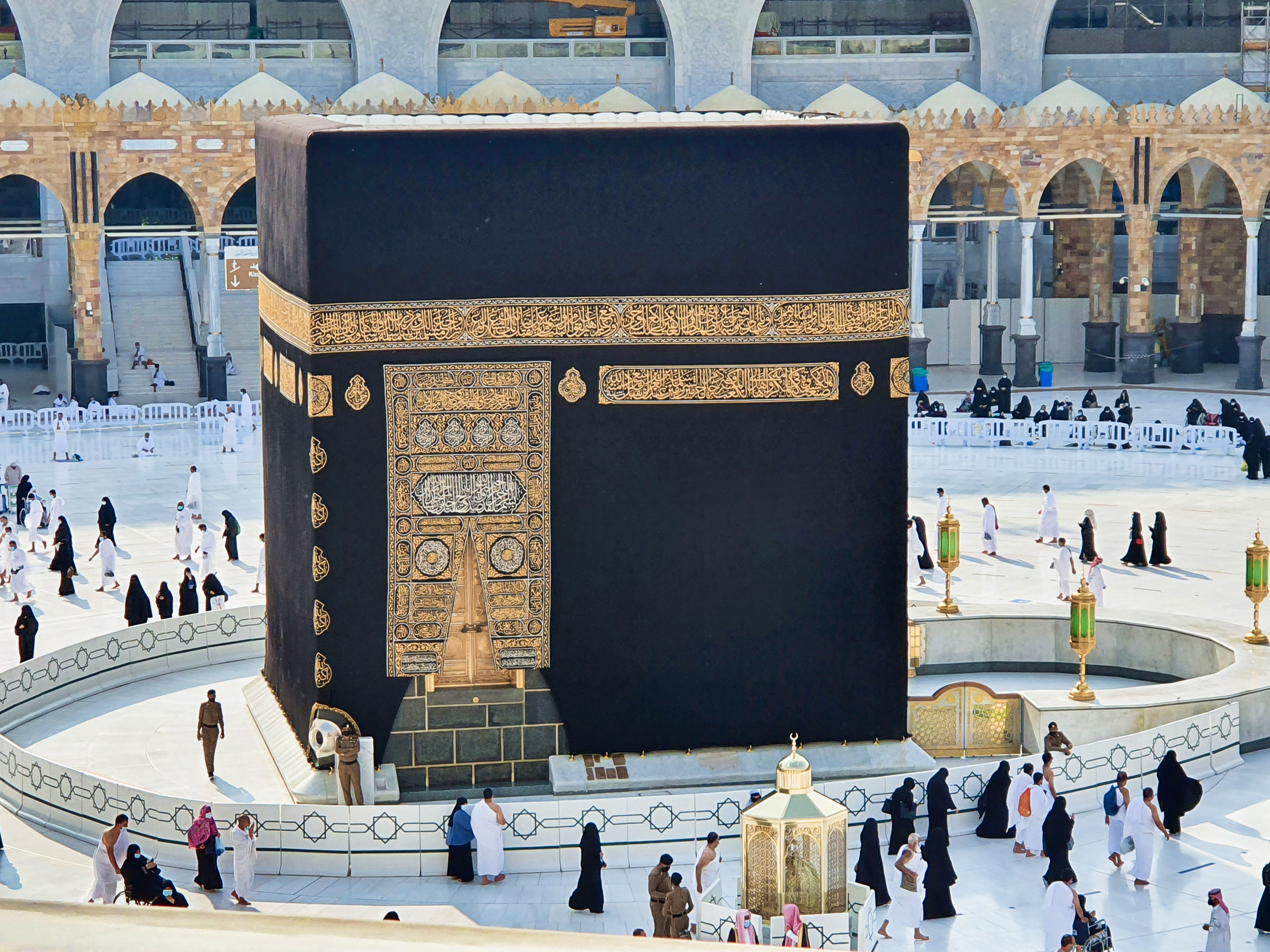
The Kaaba in the Great Mosque of Mecca.

Finally, philological evidence is provided in support of the work of Édouard-Marie Gallez who suggested that two other references in the Quran to Mecca more likely refer to the Dome of the Rock or to no specific city. Firstly, supposed references to Kaaba in the Quran etymologically denote a dome rather than a cube. Secondly, umm al-qurā interpeted as "Mother of Cities" (=Mecca), should instead be "inhabitants of the cities", because umm ("mother") is misunderstood as the result of a vowel shift from the Syriac 'ammâ (“people, community, inhabitants”). More evidence for these arguments will be provided in a future publication.

Kroes (2004) commented on an earlier version of Luxenberg's argument (appearing in a footnote in his 2000 book) as follows. "Rereading the otherwise unknown place-name Bakka to: 'that which he has demarcated' seems a good candidate for a successful reinterpretation." However, Luxenberg does make an orthographical leap of faith in tracing ببكه bibakkah (in Bakka) to the Syriac rood تيكه taykeh (that he has demarcated), instead of to بمكه bimakkah (in Mecca). "It is quite conceivable that a carelessly executed ﻤ is confused with a ﺒ, especially if the latter already existed in the shape with a diacritical dot. The whole problem with 'Bakka' has evaporated, and the translation of the passage remains unchanged", Kroes concludes.

== Other ==
=== Seal of the prophets ===
The passage in sura al-Ahzab (33:40) that has usually been translated as "seal of the prophets" means (according to Luxenberg) "witness". By this reading, Muhammad is not the last of the prophets, but a witness to those prophets who came before him.

=== Crucifixion of Christ ===
Luxenberg suggests that the Quran affirms the crucifixion of Christ, contrary to the traditional reading. Thus Sura 4:157 which is traditionally rendered as "And they did not kill him, nor did they crucify him — but it only seemed so to them" should instead, according to a correct understanding of the grammar, be read as "but they did not kill him [in a way that ended his life], and they did not crucify him [unto death]. It only seemed to them [that the crucifixion killed him]." Luxenberg furthermore contents that early Muslims commemorated the crucifixion through the Friday prayer - just as it is celebrated by Christians on Good Friday.

== Bibliography ==
Here listed are the first (usually German) edition and the first English translation of Luxenberg's publications.^{380-2}

=== Books ===
- 2000 Die Syro-Aramäische Lesart des Koran: Ein Beitrag zur Entschlüsselung der Koransprache. ISBN 3-89930-028-9.
  - 2007 English version: The Syro-Aramaic Reading of the Koran: A Contribution to the Decoding of the Language of the Koran. ISBN 978-3-89930-088-8. Google Books (sections readable).

=== Articles ===
- 2003 “Weihnachten im Koran”.
  - 2014 English version (revised): "Christmas and the Eucharist in the Qurʾān". Archived from the original on 18 June 2026.
- 2003 “Der Koran zum islamischen Kopftuch” [The Koran on the Islamic Headscarf]
- 2004 “Zur Morphologie und Etymologie von syro-aramäische sāṭānā=Satan und koranisch-arabisch šayṭān” [On the Morphology and Etymology of Syro-Aramaic sāṭānā = Satan and Koranic Arabic šayṭān]
- 2004 “Quel est la langue du coran?” [What is the Language of the Qur'an?]
- 2005 “Neudeutung der arabischen Inschrift im Felsendom zu Jerusalem”.
  - 2009 English version: “A New Interpretation of the Arabic Inscription in Jerusalem’s Dome of the Rock". Archived.
- 2007 “Zum Ursprung des Namens ‘Mohammed’ (Muḥammad = Der Gelobte). Eine in der Arabistik und Semitistik bisher nicht geklärte Etymologie” [On the Origin of the Name ‘Mohammed’ (Muḥammad = The Praised One). An Etymology Previously Unclarified in Arabic and Semitic Studies]
- 2007 “Relikte syro-aramäische Buchstaben in frühen Korankodizes im ḥiğāzī und kūfī-Duktus”
  - 2014 English version (revised and expanded): “Relics of Syro-Aramaic Letters in Early Qurʾānic Codices of the ḥiǧāzī and kūfī Style." Archived from the original on 10 June 2026.
- 2008 “Die syrische Liturgie und die ‘geheimnisvollen Buchstaben’ im Koran. Eine liturgievergleichende Studie”
  - 2014 English version: "Syriac Liturgy and the “Mysterious Letters” in the Qur’ān: A Comparative Liturgical Study". Archived from the original on 10 June 2026. Alternative.
- 2008 “Keine Schlacht von Badr: Zu syrischen Buchstaben in frühen Koranmanuskripten” [No Battle of Badr: On Syriac Letters in Early Koran Manuscripts].
- 2008 “‘Inārah’ im Koran: Zu einem bisher übersehenen Hapax Legomenon (Sure 46)” [‘Inārah’ in the Koran: On a Previously Overlooked Hapax Legomenon (Sura 46)].
- 2008 “Keine Polygamie und kein Konkubinat im Koran (Sure 4:3)” [No Polygamy and No Concubinage in the Koran (Sura 4:3)]. Archived from the original 18 June 2026. Alternative archived from the original 18 June 2026.
- 2012 “Al-Najm (Q 53), Chapter of the Stars: A New Syro-Aramaic Reading of Verses 1–18”.
- 2012 “Kein ‘Mekka’ (Makka) und kein ‘Bakka’ im Koran: Zu Sure 48:24 und 3:96: Eine philologische Analyse” [No ‘Mecca’ (Makka) and no ‘Bakka’ in the Koran: On Sura 48:24 and 3:96: A Philological Analysis]. The article was published in two parts. Part 1: archived from the original on 21 June 2026. Part 2: archived from the original on 18 June 2026.

=== Videos ===
- 2022-2026 Luxenberg published 53 videos re-interpreting Quran verses with the Syro-Aramaic method on a YouTube channel (in Arabic).

== See also ==
- Criticism of the Quran
- The Bible Came from Arabia
- Hagarism
- Günter Lüling
- Michael Cook
- Patricia Crone
- Fred Donner
- Karl-Heinz Ohlig
- Gerd R. Puin
- John Wansbrough
- Markus Groß
- N. J. Dawood, another controversial Qur'an translator.
