= At-Takathur =

102nd chapter of the Qur'an

Surah 102 of the Quran
التكاثر At-Takāthur Rivalry In Worldly Competition
- Qira'ah; English text
- Classification: Meccan
- Other names: Hoarding, Competition, Worldly Gain, Rivalry
- Position: Juzʼ 30
- No. of verses: 8
- No. of words: 28
- No. of letters: 122

At-Takathur
Recitation of At-Takathur in mujawwad.

Calligraphy of the Sura of Rivalry

At-Takāthur (Arabic: التكاثر, "Rivalry, Competition") is the 102nd chapter (sūrah) of the Qur'an, with 8 verses (āyāt). Regarding the timing and contextual background of the believed revelation (asbāb al-nuzūl), it is an earlier "Meccan surah", which means it is believed to have been revealed in Mecca, rather than later in Medina.

== Summary ==
- 1-3 Men spend their time seeking the things of this world
- 3-5 The judgment-day shall reveal their folly
- 6-8 In consequence they shall see hell-fire

== Text, translation, and transliteration ==
The translation is the Saheeh International English translation of the Qur'an.

بِسْمِ ٱللَّهِ ٱلرَّحْمَٰنِ ٱلرَّحِيمِ
Bismi l-āhi r-raḥmāni r-raḥīm(i)
In the name of Allāh, the Entirely Merciful, the Especially Merciful...

أَلْهَىٰكُمُ ٱلتَّكَاثُرُ ۝
^{1} ’al hākumu t-takāthur(u)
Competition in [worldly] increase diverts you

حَتَّىٰ زُرْتُمُ ٱلْمَقَابِرَ ۝
^{2} Ḥattā zurtumu l-maqābir(a)
Until you visit the graveyards.

كَلَّا سَوْفَ تَعْلَمُونَ ۝
^{3} Kallā sawfa ta‘lamūn(a)
No! You are going to know.

ثُمَّ كَلَّا سَوْفَ تَعْلَمُونَ ۝
^{4} Thumma kallā sawfa ta‘lamūn(a)
Then, no! You are going to know.

كَلَّا لَوْ تَعْلَمُونَ عِلْمَ ٱلْيَقِينِ ۝
^{5} Kallā law ta‘lamūna ‘ilma l-yaqīn(i)
No! If you only knew with knowledge of certainty...

لَتَرَوُنَّ ٱلْجَحِيمَ ۝
^{6} Latarawunna l-jaḥīm(a)
You will surely see (Note: The Qira'at of Ibn Amir and Al-Kisa'i translate it as "be shown" لَتُرَوُنَّ ٱلْجَحِيمَ۝ Laturawunna l-jaḥīm(a)) the Hellfire.

ثُمَّ لَتَرَوُنَّهَا عَيْنَ ٱلْيَقِينِ ۝
^{7} Thumma latarawunnahā ‘ayna l-yaqīn(i)
Then you will surely see it with the eye of certainty.

ثُمَّ لَتُسْـَٔلُنَّ يَوْمَئِذٍ عَنِ ٱلنَّعِيمِ ۝
^{8} Thumma latus’alunna yawma’idhin ‘ani n-na‘īm(i)
Then you will surely be asked that Day about pleasure.

== Overview ==
After the bismillah, this Surah is concerned with factionalism and schism amongst people. Disagreements between individuals and groups follow us "even until you visit the tombs". Three times in a row the sura warns the reader that "you shall know" that those who sow discord are headed towards Hell. Here, proper understanding is required for entrance into Paradise, and should one not attain this on Earth, one will receive the "eye of certainty" on the Day of Judgment, when "you shall be questioned ... concerning true bliss".

== Mention in ahadith ==
- It was narrated from Mutarrif, from his father, that the Prophet said: "The mutual rivalry (for piling up of worldly things) diverts you, 'Until you visit the graves (i.e. till you die).' The son of Adam says: 'My wealth, my wealth,' but your wealth is what you eat and consume, or what you wear and it wears out, or what you give in charity and send on ahead (for the Hereafter).'"
- Mutarrif bin Abdullah bin Ash-Shikh-khir reported from his father, : that he went to the Prophet and he was reciting: ‘أَلْهَاكُمُ التَّكَاثُرُ ’ He said: “The son of Adam says: ‘My wealth, my wealth.’ And do you own anything except what you give in charity, such that you've spent it, or what you eat, such that you've finished it, or you wear, such that you've worn it out?”
