= Friedrich Schwally =

German orientalist (1863–1919)

Friedrich Zacharias Schwally (10 August 1863 – 5 February 1919) was a German Orientalist with professorships at Strasbourg, Gießen and Königsberg. He held the degrees of PhD, Lic. Theol., Dr. Habil., and the Imperial honour of the Order of the Red Eagle, Class IV. He was one of the first significant academics in the field of Quranic studies.

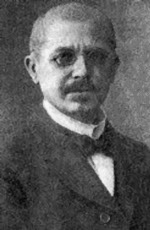
Friedrich Schwally

== His life ==
Schwally was born on 10 August 1863, in the family home at Guldengasse 16, Butzbach, Grand Duchy of Hesse, to parents Georg Peter Schwally, formerly of Wald-Michelbach, and Johannette Friederike Schwally nee Schmidt. He was named after his Godfather and cousin, Friedrich Zacharias Friedrich, a merchant in Darmstadt.

After his father's death in a railway accident when he was six years old, Schwally attended the Volksschule and Höhere Bürgerschule (literally Higher Citizen's School) in Butzbach. From autumn 1877 he attended the Ludwig-Georgs-Gymnasium in Darmstadt where he completed his schooling in autumn 1883.

As a student at Gießen University for three and a half years from 1883/84 to 1886, he studied Theology and Orientalism. With the renowned Bernhard Stade as his supervisor, Schwally completed his PhD in Old Testament Studies at Giessen by Easter 1888. He published the thesis as a book in the same year. For a short time the previous year in the summer of 1887, he attended classes with Professor Nöldeke and Professor Euting at the Kaiser Wilhelm University in Strassburg, to deepen his knowledge of Philology. This first encounter with Nöldeke would later have great significance for Schwally's career as an Orientalist.

In 1889 he obtained a teaching credential for Religion, Hebrew and German. From Easter 1889 to Easter 1890, Schwally taught at the Ludwig-Georgs-Gymnasium in Darmstadt. After further study he was awarded a Lic. Theol. from Giessen University on 23 October 1891.

But for an important event that followed, Schwally's life may have taken the traditional career path of an Old Testament scholar in a Theology Faculty. The turning point in his career came when his second doctorate (Dr. habil.) on an Old Testament topic, was not awarded by his conservative examiners at the University of Halle. This was not because of the standard of Schwally's work but because that the conclusions and implications of his thesis and its methodology, were unpalatable to his Halle examiners' conservative theology. This controversial work in English is, "Life after death according to the ideas of ancient Israel and Judaism, including Popular Beliefs in the Age of Christ", and was published as a book in 1892.

Schwally's love of Semitic languages led him to the University of Strasbourg in 1892 to again become a student of the leading German Orientalist of his time, Professor Dr. Theodor Nöldeke. In German Universities, Orientalism had evolved into a separate academic discipline in its own right, and was anchored within a Philosophy Faculty. It was based on a knowledge of languages and culture, and could also embrace historical-critical methodology for the analysis of texts. For Schwally, this was his natural home.

On obtaining his Dr Habil in 1893 from Strassburg, Schwally's first teaching position there, from 29 April 1893, was as a sessional lecturer (Privat-Dozent). Later in 1898, he was promoted to Associate Professor (Außerordentlicher Professor) in Semitic Languages. This was the traditional career progression for an academic in a German University. Schwally remained at Strassburg until 1901 from whence he took up a position at Gießen University at the same level as an Associate Professor (Extraordinary professor) in Semitic Languages.

His study trips to Cairo in both the spring of 1903 and 1904, each for three months, gave him deeper grounding for his work on the texts of the Koran and also on his study of issues of contemporary Islam. At the time, Cairo was regarded as the centre of Islamic erudition. Schwally studied at the Kedhivial Library and the Al-Azhar Mosque. He took private lessons in the methods of Koran translation and immersed himself in the local language and culture by living in Arab households. Schwally would return again to Cairo in 1912.

In 1906 he was offered, but declined, a full professorship in a newly created chair in Arabic at the privately operated Islamic Aligarh University in India. That year also saw the publication of Aegyptiaca, an essay on the lives of modern Egyptians. This was Schwally's contribution as a part of a two volume, 70th birthday tribute book to Professor Noeldeke by 86 scholars.

On 1 August 1908 he was promoted to a full professorship (Ordinary professor) at Gießen. There was a trip to Istanbul in the summer of 1908 for several months. This was the period of the "Young Turks" uprising; a topic on which Schwally published.

The year 1912 saw the publication of Letzte Krankheit, und Tod...., Schwally's contribution of Volume II, Part 2, to a nine volume series on the life of Muhammad by Eduard Sachau and others.

At the beginning of 1913, Schwally took over as head of the Philosophy Faculty at Giessen, in addition to his regular academic duties.

On 5 July 1913, the Kaiser awarded Schwally the Imperial honour of the Order of the Red Eagle, Class IV. The previous year, in the spring of 1912, Professor Schwally undertook travel throughout Egypt from which he published a paper on aspects of contemporary Egypt, Beitraege zur Kenntnis des Lebens der Mohammedanischen Staedter, Fellachen und Beduinen im heutigen Aegypten . About this time Schwally also became a member of a newly formed society for the study of contemporary Islam, Deutsche Gesellschaft für Islamkunde E.V., founded by Professor Martin Hartmann in Berlin on 9 January 1912.

From 1914 to 1919 Schwally was Professor of Semitic Languages at the University of Königsberg. In 1915, he contributed to a 70th Birthday tribute book for Professor Eduard Sachau, with whom he had had a long association as a part of the "Berlin School". Schwally died in Königsberg on 5 February 1919 at age 55. At the time, his early death was attributed to a recently discovered pre-existing heart condition.

Schwally undertook several research trips including to Cairo, Alexandria, Damascus, Palmyra, Jerusalem, Beirut, Istanbul, Paris, London, Leiden. As well, there was extensive travel within Germany. He was a robust outdoors person with the love of life, enjoying swimming, horse riding, and particularly backpacking. Schwally enjoyed his walking holidays throughout the many mountain and forest regions of Germany. Apart from his love of nature and the outdoors life, Schwally took a linguistic interest in the many dialects and accents of people he encountered on his holiday travels.

His marriage in 1895 to Ebba Kühnen in Strassburg, produced two daughters, Irene in 1898 and Hildegard (Lilli) in 1901. Another Orientalist, Professor Heinrich Zimmern, married Ebba's sister Hilda Kühnen the following year in 1896. Their mother, Irene Kühnen nee Walouieff, a niece of the Russian Prime Minister Peter Alexandrovich Walouieff (Valuev, Walujev, Valujev and various other spellings from the Cyrillic), moved to Strassburg after the death in 1893 of her husband, the landscape artist Victor Kühnen. Irene Kühnen's move to Strassburg with her daughters was at the suggestion of her friend Sophie Noeldeke, the wife of Professor Noeldeke. In Straßburg, he met and became friends with Albert Schweitzer and Theodor Heuss, a future President of Germany. One of Schwally's books was dedicated to his friends, Ignaz Goldziher in Budapest and Christian Snouck Hurgronje in Leiden, with whom he had collaborated. On Schwally's death, Professor Paul Kahle, Schwally's successor at Giessen University, kindly wrote a comprehensive five-page obituary which was published in an academic journal for Orientalist scholars, Der Islam in 1920.

== His scholarly impact ==
Schwally is best known for his 2nd Edition of Nöldeke's History of the Koran. Many Orientalists, e.g. Paret (1968), consider this as the definitive text in the field. More recently, Hans Kueng (2004, 2008) refers to the importance of this work.

The three volumes of the 2nd Edition of the History of the Koran followed a lengthy and tortuous publication path. Nöldeke was approached by his publisher in 1898 to do a new enlarged second edition of his History of the Koran. (The 1st Edition was published in German in 1860 based on a previously written prize winning essay by Nöldeke in a French competition.) Because of his advancing age, Nöldeke then asked Schwally to take on this task and gave him full responsibility for the resulting text as being Schwally's own. Volume One, Über den Ursprung des Korans, was published in 1909. After Schwally's death in February 1919, his brother-in-law Professor Heinrich Zimmern, with editing assistance from Professor August Fischer, took Schwally's manuscripts of Volume 2, Die Sammlung des Korans, to the publisher in Leipzig. Dr. Gotthelf Bergsträsser, Schwally's successor at Königsberg, continued and reworked Volume 3. When Bergsträsser died in a mountaineering incident in Bavaria in 1933, Otto Pretzl, who was Bergsträsser's pupil, continued on until final publication in 1938. The sixth reprint of this 837-page tome was published by Olms in 2008. The work is held in University libraries around the world. The Konrad Adenauer Foundation published a new Arabic translation of the 2nd Edition in 2004 in Beirut, Tarikh al-Quran, translated by Georges Tamer. Before that, a Turkish translation of the 2nd Edition by Muammer Sencer, Kur’an tarihi, was published by Ilke Yayinlari in Istanbul in 1970.

Schwally's next major activity was his many contributions to Tabaqat of Ibn Sa'd, published in Berlin.

Schwally is also widely published in other areas of Old Testament, Hebrew, Aramaic, and Islam together with a seminal paper on the topic of Holy War. His 1901 monograph Der heilige Krieg im alten Israel, was the first single comprehensive treatment of the topic, following on from prior work by Wellhausen and others. As well as publishing work on ancient texts, Schwally has published on contemporary Islam. His 1912 publication, Beitraege zur Kenntnis des Lebens der Mohammedanischen Staedter, Fellachen und Beduinen im heutigen Aegypten and the 1916 journal article Der heilige Krieg des Islams in religionsgeschichtlicher und staatsrechtlicher Beleuchtung are examples of this. He also contributed articles on International Affairs to newspapers such as the Frankfurter Zeitung.

== His publications ==
- Die Reden des Buches Jeremia gegen die Heiden, Wilhelm Keller, Gießen, 1888 (PhD thesis Giessen)
- Das Buch Ssefanja, eine historische-kritische Untersuchung, ZAW, 10 No.1 (1890):165–240 (Book of Zephaniah)
- Das Leben nach dem Tod nach den Vorstellungen des Alten Israel und des Judentums einschließlich des Volksglaubens im Zeitalter Christi: eine biblische Untersuchung, Ricker, Gießen, 1892 (D.Habil thesis Halle)
- Idioticon des Christlich Palästinischen Aramäisch, Ricker, Gießen, 1893 (D.Habil thesis Strassburg)
- Kultur des alten Orients, 1896
- Ibraham ibn Muhammed el-Baihaqi Kitab el Mahdsin val Masdwi, Leipzig, 1899–1902
- Einige Bermerkungen zum Buche Hiob. ZAW 20 No.1 (1900):44–48 (Book of Job)
- Semitische Kriegsaltertümer: Der heilige Krieg im alten Israel, Weicher, Leipzig, 1901
- Kitab al-mahasin vai-masavi, herausgegeben von Friedrich Schwally mit Unterstützung der königl. Preussischen Akademie der Wissenschaften, Ricker, Gießen, 1902
- Bernhard Stade, The books of Kings; critical edition of the Hebrew text, Hinrichs, Leipzig, 1904 (Schwally and several others contributed to this)
- Die biblischen Schöpfungsberichte, B.G. Teubner, Leipzig, 1906
- Aegyptiaca, in Theodor Noeldeke zum Siebzigsten Geburtstag (2 Marz 1906) gewidmet, edited by Carl Bezold, LIV and 1187 pages in two volumes, Giessen: A. Toepelmann, 1906
- Geschichte des Qorans von Theodor Nöldeke, (Zweite Auflage bearbeitet von Friedrich Schwally), Teil 1: Über den Ursprung des Qorans, Weicher, Leipzig, 1909
- Unpolitische Briefe aus der Türkei, Gedanken über die Zukunft der Türkei, Frankfurter Zeitung, Nr.133 vom 15. Mai 1910 (in conjunction with Martin Hartmann)
- Biographien Muhammeds, Letzte Krankheit, Tod und die Bestattung Muhammeds nebst Trauergedichten ueber ihn. Biographen der Kenner des Kannonischen Rechts und des Korans, die zu Lebzeiten des Propheten und in der folgender Generation in Medina gewirkt haben, Band II:Teil 2, Brill, Leiden, 1912 (part of a nine volume series 1905–1940, Eduard Sachau et al.)
- Beiträge zur Kenntnis des Lebens der Mohammedanischen Städter, Fellachen und Beduinen im heutigen Ägypten, Heidelberg, 1912
- Betrachtungen über die Koransammlung des Abu Bekr, 321–325, in Festschrift Eduard Sachau; zum siebzigsten Geburtstage gewidmet von Freunden & Schülern: Weil, Gotthold & Sachau, Eduard: Georg Reimer, Berlin, 1915
- Der heilige Krieg des Islam in religionsgeschichtlicher und staatsrechtlicher Beleuchtung, Internationale Monatsschrift für Wissenschaft, Kunst und Technik, Bd.10, pp: 688–713, Berlin, 1916
- Geschichte des Qorans von Theodor Nöldeke, (Zweite Auflage bearbeitet von Friedrich Schwally), Teil 2: Die Sammlung des Qorans, Weicher, Leipzig, 1919
