= Behnam Sadeghi =

Professor of Religious Studies

Behnam Sadeghi (born September 16, 1969) is a scholar of Quranic studies, Islamic law and Islamic history. He was assistant professor of religious studies at Stanford University from 2006 to 2016.

== Biography ==
Sadeghi received his PhD in 2006 from Princeton University. His doctoral dissertation investigated textual interpretation methods used in the Hanafi school of law during the pre-modern period. He has conducted research on the early history of the Qur'an, hadith literature, and early legal debates about women in the public sphere.

== Works ==
- The Logic of Law Making in Islam: Women and Prayer in the Legal Tradition
- Sadeghi, B. (2013) Criteria for Emending the Text of the Qur’ān. In: Cook, M., Haider, N., Rabb, I., Sayeed, A. (eds) Law and Tradition in Classical Islamic Thought. Palgrave Macmillan, New York. https://doi.org/10.1057/9781137078957_2.

== See also ==
- Ahmed El Shamsy
- Walid Saleh
