= Michael E. Pregill =

Scholar of late antiquity, comparative religion and Quranic studies

Michael E. Pregill is a scholar of late antiquity, comparative religion and Quranic studies. He is Interlocutor in the Institute for the Study of Muslim Societies and Civilizations at Boston University.

== Works ==
- The Golden Calf between Bible and Qur’an: Scripture, Polemic, and Exegesis from Late Antiquity to Islam
