= Sean Anthony (historian) =

Islamic studies scholar

Sean William Anthony is a historian specializing in the areas of Quranic studies, early Islam and Late Antiquity, and Classical Arabic literature. He is currently College of Arts and Sciences Distinguished Professor in the Department of Near Eastern and South Asian Languages and Cultures at Ohio State University in the United States, and he previously taught at the University of Oregon. He obtained both his Master of Arts and PhD from the University of Chicago. He is also the current Executive Editor of the Journal of the International Qur’anic Studies Association (JIQSA).

== Selected works ==
- Anthony, Sean (2025). "The Early Aramaic Toledot Yeshu and the End of Jesus's Earthly Mission in the Qur'an". Studies in Late Antiquity. 9 (2): 151–185. doi:10.1525/sla.2025.9.2.151.
- Strategius (2024). The Capture of Jerusalem by the Persians in 614 CE by Strategius of Mar Saba. Translated by Anthony, Sean; Shoemaker, Stephen. Institute for the Study of Ancient Cultures.
- Anthony, Sean (2022). "The Virgin Annunciate in the Meccan Qurʾan: Q. Maryam 19:19 in Context". Journal of Near Eastern Studies. 81 (2): 363–385. doi:10.1086/721353.
- Anthony, Sean (2020). Muhammad and the Empires of Faith: The Making of the Prophet of Islam. University of California Press.
- Anthony, Sean (2019). "Two 'Lost' Sūras of the Qurʾān: Sūrat al-Khalʿ and Sūrat al-Ḥafd between Textual and Ritual Canon (1st -3rd/7th -9th Centuries)". Jerusalem Studies in Arabic and Islam. 46: 67–112.
- Anthony, Sean (2019). "The Satanic Verses in Early Shiʿite Literature: A Minority Report on Shahab Ahmed's Before Orthodoxy". Shii Studies Review. 3 (1–2): 215–252. doi:10.1163/24682470-12340043.
- Anthony, Sean; Bronson, Catherine (2016). "Did Ḥafṣah edit the Qurʾān? A Response with Notes on the Codices of the Prophet's Wives" (PDF). Journal of the International Qur'anic Studies Association. 1 (1): 93–126. doi:10.5913/jiqsa.1.2017.a006.
- Anthony, Sean (2016). "Muḥammad, Menaḥem, and the Paraclete: new light on Ibn Isḥāq's (d. 150/767) Arabic version of John 15: 23–16: 11" (PDF). Bulletin of the School of Oriental and African Studies. 79 (2): 255–278. doi:10.1017/S0041977X16000458.
- Rashid, Ma'mar ibn (2015). The Expeditions: An Early Biography of Muḥammad. Translated by Anthony, Sean. New York University Press.
- Anthony, Sean (2014). "Muḥammad, the Keys to Paradise, and the Doctrina Iacobi: A Late Antique Puzzle" (PDF). Der Islam. 91 (2): 243–265. doi:10.1515/islam-2014-0010.
