= Otto Pretzl =

German Arabist-orientalist (1893–1941)

Otto Pretzl (Ingolstadt, 20 April 1893 – Sevastopol, 28 October 1941) was a German Arabist-orientalist, who specialized in Koranic studies.

From 1912, Pretzl studied at the Pontifical Gregorian University in Rome, and in 1920 was ordained as a priest in Freising. Afterwards, he studied theology and Oriental languages at the Ludwig-Maximilians-Universität München, where he later qualified as a lecturer in Old Testament exegesis in 1928 and Islamic and Semitic languages in 1933. In 1934, he became an associate professor at the university, attaining a full professorship during the following year. In 1937, he became a member of the Bavarian Academy of Sciences.

In 1938, Pretzl documented the emergence of a de facto islamic canonical text, namely the 1924 Cairo edition of the Quran. Pretzl listed the variants between the orthography of the Cairo text and the recommendations of Andalusian Qurʾān reciter, Abu Amr al-Dani (d. 1053).

Otto Pretzl died in a plane crash in 1941.

== Selected works ==
- Die frühislamische Attributenlehre, 1940 – Early Islamic attributes doctrine.
- Die Fortführung des Apparatus Criticus zum Koran 1934; Continuation of the critical apparatus of the Koran.
