= Gotthelf Bergsträsser =

German linguist (1886–1933)

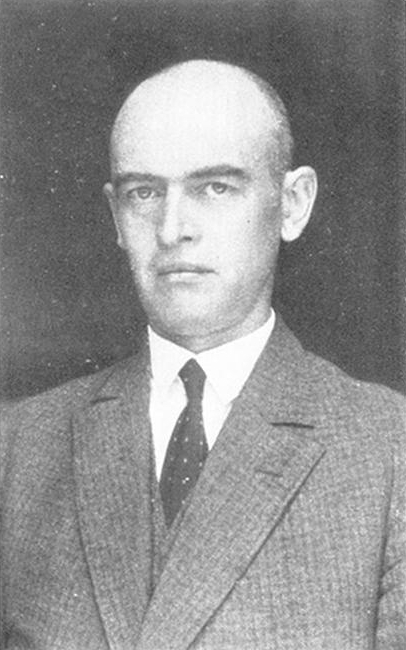
- Born: April 5, 1886; Oberlosa, Plauen, Germany
- Died: August 16, 1933 (aged 47); Near Berchtesgaden, Germany
- Occupations: Linguist, professor
- Known for: Semitic studies, Arabic linguistics

Gotthelf Bergsträsser (5 April 1886, in Oberlosa, Plauen – 16 August 1933, near Berchtesgaden) was a German linguist specializing in Semitic studies, generally considered to be one of the greatest of the twentieth century. Bergsträsser was initially a teacher of classical languages before deciding to approach Semitic.

He was a professor at Istanbul University during World War I, when he was an officer in the German army stationed in Turkey. While there, he studied the spoken dialects of Arabic and Aramaic in Syria and Palestine. One of his most well-known works is the 29th (and final) edition of Wilhelm Gesenius' Hebrew Grammar (1918–1929), which remained incomplete, containing only phonology and morphology of the verb. His Introduction to the Semitic Languages (1928, English 1983) was also widely admired. These brought him international fame as a scholar. His last position was professor of Semitic languages at the Ludwig-Maximilians-Universität München.

Bergsträsser mostly engaged in the study of Arabic, focusing on the history of the text of the Qur'an. He worked alongside Arthur Jeffrey, a Methodist minister and professor at the American University in Cairo, filming early Qur'anic manuscripts and studying qira'at literature in preparation to produce a critical edition of the Qur'an. Bergsträsser left many of his planned works unfinished (including the rest of his Hebrew grammar and his grammar of spoken Aramaic), when he disappeared while mountaineering in Bavaria in 1933.

He was also a historian of Islamic law as evinced by his Grundzüge des islamischen Rechts (Basics of Islamic Law), which was edited and published posthumously by the famous scholar of Islam, Joseph Schacht (Columbia University). He covers topics such as the indigenous history of Islamic law, contractual law, personal law, family law, criminal law, business law, inheritance law, procedural law, etc.

Bergsträsser was an outspoken anti-Nazi and helped to save German Jewish scholars. Gotthelf Bergsträsser died on the 16th of August in 1933. His companion Friedrich Thiersch recorded an account of his death in a 16 page typed statement to the local authorities recounting that Bergsträsser had fallen off a sharp incline during the excursion and had injured his head. Thiersch had remained with him through the night until Bergsträsser died. His death though was the subject of speculation with some arguing that he was killed by a student for his anti-Nazi views while mountaineering in Bavaria.

== Bibliography ==
- Die Negationen im Kur'an (1911)
- Hunain ibn Ishaq und seine Schule. Sprach- und literaturgeschichtliche Untersuchungen zu den arabischen Hippokrates- und Galen-Übersetzungen (1913)
- Verneinungs- und Fragepartikeln und Verwandtes im Kur'an (Leipzig, 1914; 1968)
- Sprachatlas von Syrien und Palästina (1915)
- Neuaramäische Märchen und andere Texte aus Malula (1915). Contains transcription and German translation.
- Neue meteorologische Fragmente des Theophrast. Arabisch und deutsch (1918/19)
- Zum arabischen Dialekt von Damaskus. Phonetik und Prosatexte (1924)
- Hunain ibn Ishaq. Über die syrischen und arabischen Galen-Übersetzungen (1925). Contains Arabic text and German translation.
- Einführung in die semitischen Sprachen. Sprachproben und Grammatische Skizzen (1928; 1963 ISBN 3-19-005024-4)
- Plan eines Apparatus Criticus zum Koran (München, 1930)
- ′Koranlesung in Kairo′, Der Islam 20 (1932), 1–42.
- Die Geschichte des Korantexts with O. Pretzl in Theodor Nöldeke, Geschichte des Qorans (Leipzig 1938; 1961)
- Nichtkanonische Koranlesarten im Muhtasab des ibn Ginni (München, 1933)
- Phonogramme im neuaramäischen Dialekt von Malula (1933)
- Grundzüge des islamischen Rechts (edited and published by Joseph Schacht, 1935)
