= Numayrid dynasty =

Arab dynasty circa 990-1081

Numayrid Emirate النميريون an-Numayriyyun
- 990–1081
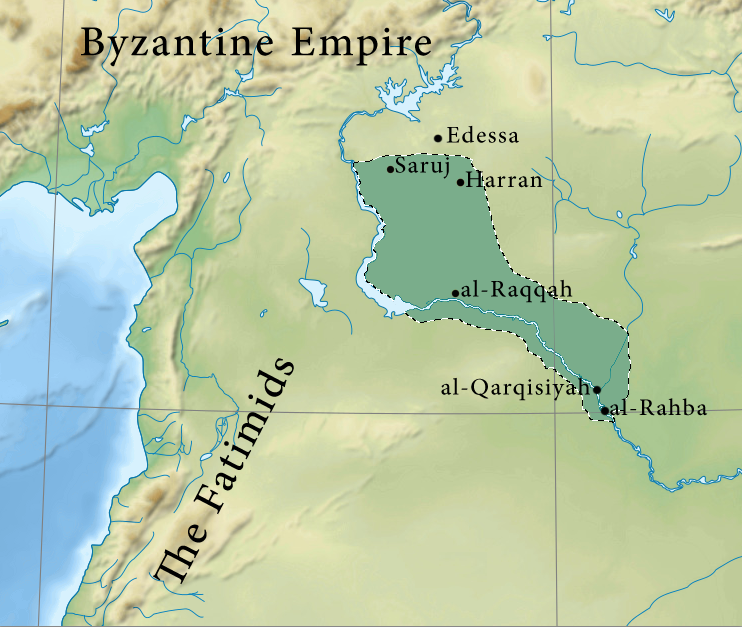
- The Numayrids at their zenith, ca. 1058–1060
- Capital: Harran
- Common languages: Arabic
- Religion: Shia Islam
- Government: Emirate
- Emir
  - 990–1019: Waththāb ibn Sābiq al-Numayrī
  - 1019–1040: Shabīb ibn Waththāb
  - 1040–1056: Muṭaʿin ibn Waththāb
  - 1056–1063: Manīʿ ibn Shabīb
- History
  - Independence from Hamdanids: 990
  - Loss of Edessa: 1031
  - Fatimid vassalage: 1037
  - Abbasid allegiance: 1060
  - Uqaylids' conquest and later Seljuks: 1081
- Currency: Dirham, dinar
Preceded by	Succeeded by
Hamdanid dynasty	Uqaylid dynasty; Seljuk Empire
- Today part of: Turkey; Syria

The Numayrids (Arabic: النميريون) were an Arab dynasty based in Diyar Mudar (western Upper Mesopotamia). They were emirs (princes) of their namesake tribe, the Banu Numayr. The senior branch of the dynasty, founded by Waththab ibn Sabiq in 990, ruled the Euphrates cities of Harran, Saruj and Raqqa more or less continuously until the late 11th century. In the early part of Waththab's reign (r. 990–1019), the Numayrids also controlled Edessa until the Byzantines conquered it in the early 1030s. In 1062, the Numayrids lost Raqqa to their distant kinsmen and erstwhile allies, the Mirdasids, while by 1081, their capital Harran and nearby Saruj were conquered by the Turkish Seljuks and their Arab Uqaylid allies. Numayrid emirs continued to hold isolated fortresses in Upper Mesopotamia, such as Qal'at an-Najm and Sinn Ibn Utayr near Samosata until the early 12th century, but nothing is heard of them after 1120.

As Bedouin (nomadic Arabs), most Numayrid emirs avoided settled life in the cities they controlled; rather, they ruled their emirates (principalities) from their tribal encampments in the countryside, while entrusting administration of the cities to their ghilmān (military slaves). An exception was Emir Mani' ibn Shabib (r. ca. 1044–1063), under whom the Numayrids reached their territorial peak. Mani' resided inside Harran, transforming its Sabian temple into an ornate, fortified palace. The Numayrids were Shia Muslims and initially recognized the religious sovereignty of the Sunni Muslim Abbasid Caliphate, at least nominally, but later switched allegiance to the Shia Fatimid Caliphate after the latter extended its influence into northern Syria in 1037. By 1060, they likely reverted to Abbasid suzerainty.

== Territory ==
The Numayrids ruled the Diyar Mudar region in the western Jazira (Upper Mesopotamia), controlling the lands between Harran, Saruj and Raqqa more or less continuously between 990 and 1081. For much of this time, they were bordered to the south and west by the Aleppo-based Mirdasid Emirate, to the east by the Mosul-based Uqaylid Emirate, to the north by the Mayyafariqin-based Marwanid Emirate and to the northwest by the Byzantine Empire. The Numayrids, Mirdasids and Uqaylids were Arab dynasties and the Marwanids were Kurds. All were independent, petty dynasties that emerged in northern Syria and Upper Mesopotamia in the late 10th–early 11th centuries due to the inability of the great regional powers i.e. the Baghdad-based Abbasid Caliphate, the Cairo-based Fatimid Caliphate and the Byzantines, to control or annex these regions. At different times, the Numayrids paid allegiance and formed loose alliances with all three powers.

== History ==
=== Origins ===
The Numayrid emirs belonged to the Banu Numayr tribe, the dynasty's namesake. The Banu Numayr were a branch of the Banu Amir ibn Sa'sa tribe and therefore of Qaysi, or north Arabian, lineage; the Arab tribes were generally divided into northern and southern Arabian lineages. The name "Numayr" is likely associated with nimr, the Arabic word for "leopard". Unlike most of the children of Amir ibn Sa'sa who became progenitors of large branches of the tribe, Numayr had a different maternal lineage and did not enter into any tribal alliances. For much of their history, the Banu Numayr were an impoverished, nomadic group that mostly engaged in brigandage. They did not enter the historical record until the Umayyad period (661–750 CE) when they dominated the western hills of al-Yamama in central Arabia. As a consequence of their brigandage, the Banu Numayr were dispersed in an expedition by the Abbasid general Bugha al-Kabir in 846, but recuperated in later decades.

The 13th-century chronicler Ibn al-Adim holds that the Banu Numayr migrated to Upper Mesopotamia from al-Yamama in 921, while the historian Clifford Edmund Bosworth places their arrival at sometime between 940 and 955. This corresponded with the second major, post-Islamic migration of Arab tribes to Syria and Mesopotamia, this time in association with the Qarmatian movement. Like the Banu Numayr, many of the tribes that formed part of the Qarmatian army were also branches of the Banu Amir from Arabia, including the Banu Kilab, Banu Khafaja, Banu Uqayl and Banu Qushayr. These Bedouin groups largely uprooted the pre-established, sedentary Arab tribesmen of Upper Mesopotamia, rendered the roads unsafe for travel and severely damaged crop cultivation. According to the 10th-century chronicler Ibn Hawqal,

... the Banu Numayr ... expelled them [peasants and settled Bedouin] from some of their lands, indeed most of them, while appropriating some places and regions ... They decide over their protection and protection money.

In 942, Banu Numayr tribesmen served as auxiliary troops for an Abbasid governor in Upper Mesopotamia. Six years later, they were employed in the same fashion by Sayf ad-Dawla (r. 945–967), the Hamdanid emir of Aleppo, against incursions by the Ikhshidid leader Abu al-Misk Kafur. Not long after, Sayf attempted to check the Bedouin tribes, whose growing strength came at the expense of the settled population. The Banu Numayr were driven out of Diyar Mudar and took refuge in Jabal Sinjar in Diyar Rabi'a to the east. Along with other Qaysi tribes, the Banu Numayr revolted against Sayf and the Hamdanid emir of Mosul, Nasir al-Dawla. The latter expelled them to the Syrian Desert, while in 955/56, Sayf gained their submission, after which he confined them to an area near the Khabur River in Diyar Mudar. By 957, Sayf launched another expedition against the Banu Numayr tribesmen, who proved to be unruly subjects.

=== Establishment in Harran ===
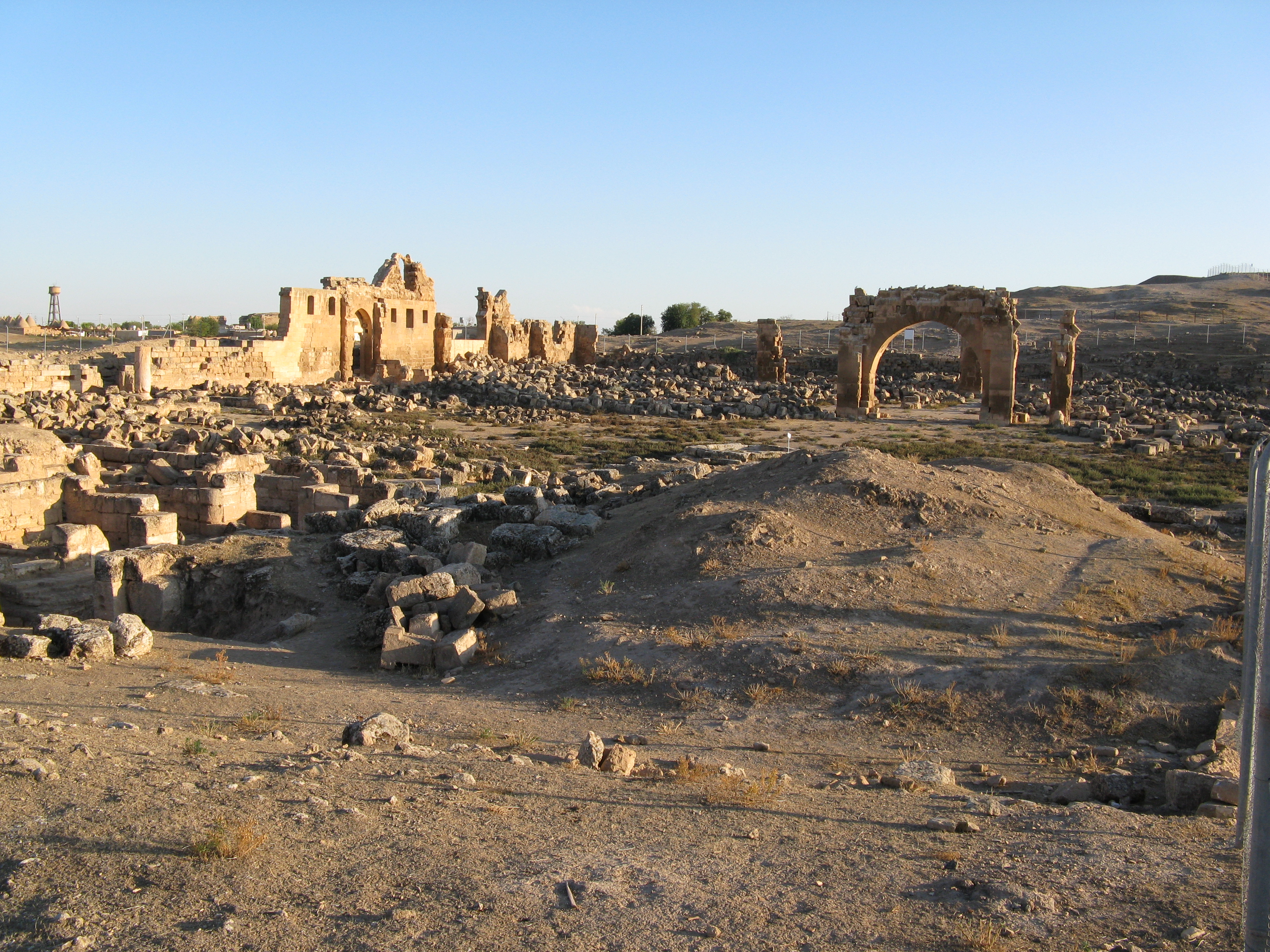
Ruins of Harran, the principal center of the Numayrid dynasty which they held between 990 and 1081

When Sayf died in 967, his Aleppo-based emirate (principality) entered a period of administrative decline. This hampered the Hamdanids' ability to effectively control the southeastern areas of Diyar Mudar, near the hostile Byzantine frontier, necessitating further reliance on the Banu Numayr. To that end, Sayf's successor, Sa'd ad-Dawla, assigned members of the tribe to governorships in cities such as Harran, to which he appointed an emir of the Banu Numayr, Wathhab ibn Sabiq. In 990, the latter rebelled against the Hamdanids and declared an independent emirate in Harran. This marked the establishment of the Numayrid dynasty.

Later in 990, Waththab took over the fortified town of Saruj to the west of Harran, and in 1007, he conquered Raqqa from its Hamdanid governor, Mansur ibn Lu'lu'. During his early reign, Waththab also annexed Edessa, north of Saruj, from the Hamdanids, and granted it to his cousin Utayr. The capture of Edessa put the Numayrids in a strategic position vis-a-vis the Byzantines, whose territory bordered Edessa from the north and west. Wathhab died in 1019/20 and was succeeded by his son Shabib.

=== Reign of Shabib ===
The Numayrids may have lost control of Harran sometime after Waththab's death. Furthermore, during Shabib's early reign, Edessa's inhabitants grew increasingly antagonistic toward Utayr, likely because he killed the city's popular deputy ruler. In 1030, Nasr ad-Dawla, the Marwanid emir of Mayyafariqin, intervened on behalf of Edessa's inhabitants, killed Utayr and captured the city. Accounts vary as to whether Nasr ad-Dawla or the Mirdasid emir of Aleppo, Salih ibn Mirdas, arbitrated the division of Edessa following Utayr's fall. In any case, a son of Utayr, known in sources only as "Ibn Utayr", was appointed governor of Edessa's main citadel, while Shibl ad-Dawla, a minor Numayrid emir, was given the city's lesser citadel. Thus, while Edessa remained in Numayrid hands, it was effectively outside of Shabib's control.

In 1030/31, negotiations were initiated between the Byzantines and Ibn Utayr or the latter's Marwanid patrons over transferring Edessa's main citadel to Byzantine control; at the time, Ibn Utayr was being challenged by Shibl ad-Dawla of the lesser citadel, prompting either Ibn Utayr or the Marwanids to sell the main citadel to the Byzantine emperor, Romanus III, for 20,000 gold dinars and several villages. After the purchase, Shibl's forces fled, the Muslim inhabitants were massacred and the city's mosques were burned down. Ibn Utayr, meanwhile, apparently relocated to a fortress named after him near Samosata called "Sinn Ibn Utayr".

Terms between Shabib and the Byzantines were reached in 1032 and during delineation of borders, Edessa was left in Byzantine territory, while the rest of Diyar Mudar remained under Numayrid rule. For an undetermined period afterward, Shabib paid tribute to the Byzantines. Because he was unable to effectively challenge the Byzantines, Shabib focused on expanding his domain eastward and northward into Marwanid and Uqaylid territory. In 1033, he assaulted Uqaylid-held Nisibin, but was repelled. The following year he gained Byzantine military backing and advanced against Amid, the Marwanid capital. He retreated after a show of strength by a Marwanid–Uqaylid coalition. Also in 1033/34, the city of Harran was restored to Shabib, on the heel of a severe famine, plague and local uprising. By 1036, Shabib and Ibn Utayr defected from the Byzantines and joined the Marwanid–Uqaylid effort to expel the Byzantines from Edessa. The Numayrids captured and looted the city, took several men captive and killed many of the inhabitants. However, they did not seize the citadel and Shabib hastily withdrew to confront a Seljuq threat to Harran. Shabib and the Byzantines made peace in 1037 and Edessa was confirmed as a Byzantine possession.

The peace between Shabib and his neighbors freed him up to back his brother-in-law Nasr ibn Salih, the Mirdasid emir of Aleppo, against the offensive of Anushtakin al-Dizbari, the Damascus-based Fatimid governor of Syria in 1037; The Fatimids were aiming to extend direct control over northern Syria which was held by their nominal vassals, the Mirdasids. The latter were members of the Banu Kilab and as such, distant kinsmen of the Banu Numayr. According to historian Suhayl Zakkar, the two tribes generally maintained friendly relations, and historian Thierry Bianquis holds that the "Numayr–Kilab alliance ... controlled all northern Syria and much of western Jazira (Upper Mesopotamia)". Shabib's sister, al-Sayyida Alawiyya, who was noted for her intelligence and beauty, was married to Nasr ibn Salih and later played an important role in Aleppan politics. Al-Dizbari killed Nasr ibn Salih in May 1038 and advanced against Aleppo, prompting Shabib, al-Sayyida and Nasr's brother and successor Thimal to retreat to Upper Mesopotamia. Afterward, al-Sayyida married Thimal. By 1038 Shabib paid allegiance to the Fatimids and ordered Caliph al-Mustansir to be recognized as the Islamic sovereign in Friday prayers. This marked a formal break with the Abbasid Caliphate, whose religious legitimacy the Numayrids had previously acknowledged.

=== Struggle for Raqqa ===
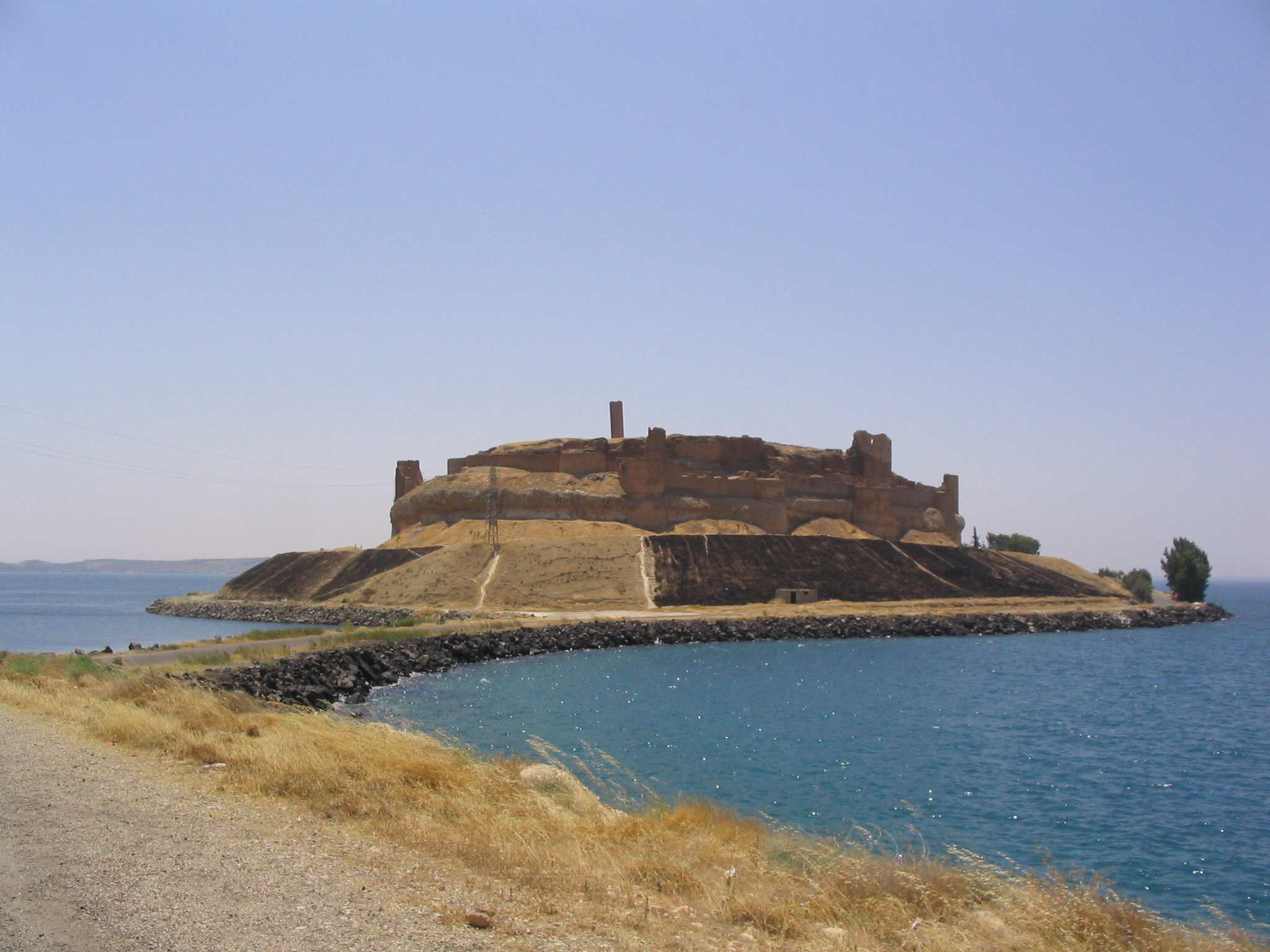
Mani ibn Shabib sold the Qal'at Ja'bar fortress to the Fatimid governor Anushtakin al-Dizbari, but repossessed it following the latter's death in 1041.

Shabib died without an adult heir in 1039/40, and as a result, Numayrid territory was split between his brothers Muta'in and Qawam, who jointly held Harran and Raqqa, and a certain Hasan, apparently a son of Shabib, who ruled Saruj. Shabib's death saw the start of a long feud between the Banu Numayr and Banu Kilab over Raqqa and the fertile pastures surrounding that city. At the time of Shabib's death, al-Sayyida lived in al-Rafiqah, immediately adjacent to Raqqa, having moved there with Thimal after the Fatimid occupation of Aleppo. She sought to seize Raqqa from her brothers' deputy governor, and married Thimal "to uphold her authority and safeguard her interests", according to Ibn al-Adim. Thimal took over Raqqa, thereby expanding the Banu Kilab's tribal territory over the entire area between the Balikh and Euphrates rivers. Around the same time, al-Dizbari, wary of Thimal's growing power base in Upper Mesopotamia, purchased the Qal'at Ja'bar fortress, north of Raqqa, from Shabib's son Mani'. When al-Dizbari died in 1041, Mani' immediately repossessed Qal'at Ja'bar. By then, Thimal reconciled with the Fatimids and was restored to Aleppo.

Tensions over Raqqa increased when Mani' came of age and took charge of the Banu Numayr between 1044 and 1056. Mani' viewed himself as the rightful heir to Shabib's possessions and sought to retrieve them by force. He switched the Numayrids' formal allegiance from the Fatimids to the Seljuq sultan Tughril Beg of Baghdad, who sent Mani' robes of honor and issued a decree granting him Raqqa. In April 1056, after Thimal rejected Mani's demand to withdraw from Raqqa, hostilities broke out between the two sides. By then, Mani' had already seized Harran from his uncles.

The Fatimids attempted to stabilize the situation in Upper Mesopotamia and assist the anti-Seljuq general Arslan al-Basasiri, whom they sought to use to invade Iraq. (Note: Arslan al-Basasiri was a Buyid general who resisted the Seljuq invasion of Baghdad in 1055. He was forced out of the city and then based himself in al-Rahba, where he organized his plan to retake Baghdad.) The Fatimid envoy, al-Mu'ayyad al-Shirazi, held a highly negative view of Mani' and leaned towards supporting Thimal, but was later convinced by the chieftain of the Banu Mazyad in al-Basasiri's camp that Mani' was essential to the anti-Seljuq cause. Al-Mu'ayyad persuaded Mani' to defect to the Fatimids. In reward, al-Basasiri captured Raqqa from Thimal and transferred it to Mani' in October 1057. According to chronicler Ibn Shaddad, al-Basasiri did not capture Raqqa; rather, Thimal handed over both Raqqa and al-Rafiqah to Mani' due to military pressure.

=== Zenith ===
Thimal's surrender of Raqqa was part of a greater power shift in northern Syria and Upper Mesopotamia as Thimal was also compelled by the Fatimids to evacuate Aleppo in January 1058. Meanwhile, Mani' was given large amounts of money by the Fatimids to secure his support for al-Basasiri's campaign. These sums enabled Mani' to firmly establish himself in Harran by constructing a palace-citadel there at the site of the former Sabian temple. In January 1059, al-Basasiri managed to drive out the Seljuqs from Baghdad, overthrow the Abbasid caliph al-Qa'im (r. 1031–1059, 1060–1075) and proclaim Fatimid suzerainty over Baghdad. By then, Mani' was wealthier and more powerful than ever. The Numayrids did not assist al-Basasiri in this campaign despite their formal alliance. In the meantime, Mani' sought to buttress the Numayrid realm in case of an Abbasid–Seljuq resurgence in Iraq; the lack of support to both Mani' and al-Basasiri from Cairo, which had just experienced significant political changes, may have persuaded Mani' to return to the Abbasid–Seljuq fold. That year, Mani' extended Numayrid territory to its southernmost extent by capturing the Khabur/Euphrates-area fortress towns of al-Rahba and al-Qarqisiyah (Circesium). Moreover, he gave refuge in Harran to al-Qa'im's four-year-old grandson and heir apparent, Uddat ad-Din, who had been smuggled out of Baghdad.

In 1060, after al-Basisiri's forty-week reign came to an end with his defeat and execution by the Seljuqs, Mani' married one of his daughters to Uddat ad-Din to establish ties with the caliph's family. Uddat ad-Din was then returned to Baghdad with many gifts and would later succeed al-Qa'im, who had since regained his throne. Though not explicitly mentioned in contemporary chronicles, Mani' likely reverted his allegiance to the Abbasids in the aftermath of al-Basasiri's defeat. According to historian D. S. Rice, the Numayrids greatly benefited from the "Basasiri incident", having gained Raqqa from the Mirdasids and given large sums by the Fatimids "without committing themselves" to the "hazardous enterprise" of participating in al-Basasiri's coup attempt. The period between 1058 and 1060 represented the peak of Numayrid power.

=== Decline and fall ===
In 1060, Mani' backed his nephew and Mirdasid ruler, Mahmud ibn Nasr (son of Nasr ibn Salih and al-Sayyida Alawiyya), against Thimal's attempt to take back Aleppo. Mahmud was ultimately defeated and given refuge by Mani'. Al-Sayyida Alawiyya then intervened and mediated a truce between Thimal and Mani'. Nonetheless, the latter saw another serious setback at the hands of the Mirdasids when Thimal's brother, Atiyya ibn Salih, took over Raqqa in 1062. Not long after, in either July 1062 or April 1063, Mani' died of a seizure, leaving no capable successor. Heidemann asserts that with Mani's death, "the Banu Numayr lost much of their importance and soon fell into oblivion".

The expansion of Seljuq power into Syria and Upper Mesopotamia after their victory over the Byzantines at the Battle of Manzikert in 1071 threatened the Numayrid emirate; the Byzantine defeat deprived both the Numayrids and the Mirdasids of a powerful protector. In 1081, the Uqaylid emir Muslim ibn Quraysh, backed by the Seljuqs, conquered Harran from Mani's successor(s), whose names were not recorded in the sources. According to medieval historian Ibn al-Athir, Ibn Quraysh appointed Yahya ibn ash-Shatir, a Numayrid ghulām (slave) and administrator who assisted Ibn Quraysh, as governor of Harran, while another medieval chronicler, Sibt ibn al-Jawzi, claims a certain Ja'far al-Uqayli was made governor and promoted Shia Islam there. That same year, the Uqaylids wrested control of Saruj from Hasan, who had held it continuously since 1039. Hasan was given Nisibin in exchange and ruled that city as an Uqaylid vassal.

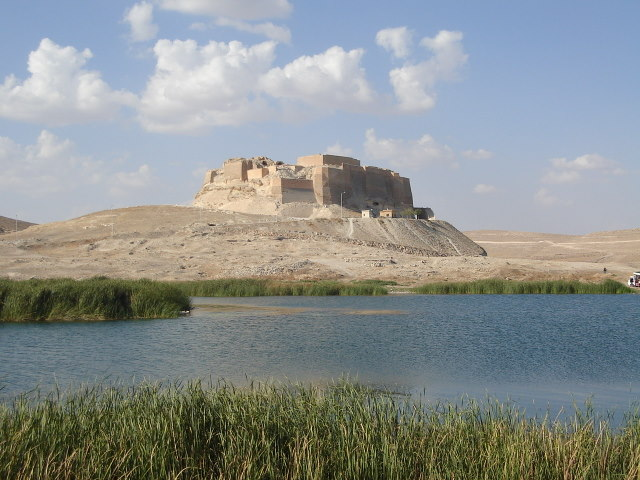
Qal’at an-Najm was the last recorded possession of the Numayrids

In 1083, Abu Jalaba, the Hanbali qadi (chief Islamic judge) of Harran, and a Numayrid emir (either Ibn Utayr or a certain Ibn Atiyya an-Numayri) led a revolt against the Uqaylids in 1083; The rebels fought in the name of a Numayrid child prince, Ali ibn Waththab, possibly a young son of Mani', and took over the town for a short period. By the end of the year, the uprising was suppressed by Ibn Quraysh, who executed Abu Jalaba, the latter's sons and about one hundred other participants. Ibn ash-Shatir continued to administer Harran after Ibn Quraysh's death in 1085 and was re-confirmed in his post by the Seljuq sultan Malik-Shah in 1086. The advent of the Seljuqs and affiliated Turkmen tribal forces at this time effectively put an end to the reign of Arab tribal powers, including the Banu Numayr, in northern Syria and Upper Mesopotamia.

Despite the loss of their capital and much of their power, the Numayrids maintained a presence in the region into the 12th century, holding onto a few fortresses that were isolated from each other, including Qal'at an-Najm on the northern Euphrates and Sinn Ibn Utayr. According to Rice, the Banu Numayr "were still spasmodically active" during this period. In 1101, they killed the Uqaylid emir, Ibn Quraysh's son Muhammad ibn Muslim, at Hit, and four years later led an abortive raid against the Seljuq general Afshin. In 1110, the Numayrids, led by a certain Jawshan an-Numayri, seized Raqqa from its Turkmen governor Ali ibn Salim, who they killed, but were dislodged a short time later. The Crusaders, who had entered the region at the beginning of the century, captured Sinn Ibn Utayr from the Numayrid emir Mani' ibn Utayr an-Numayri in 1118. The medieval chronicler al-Azimi recorded that the Numayrids still held Qal'at an-Najm in 1120, but nothing else is heard of the Numayrids in the following centuries. Based on his research, Rice found that as of 1952 the descendants of the Banu Numayr continued to live in and around Harran and were known as the Nmēr, a colloquial form of "Numayr", and belonged to the confederation of Jēs, a colloquial form of "Qays". He also noted that they were unaware "that their ancestors had once been, for nearly a century, the 'Lords of Raqqa, Saruj and Harran'".

== Culture ==
=== Government ===
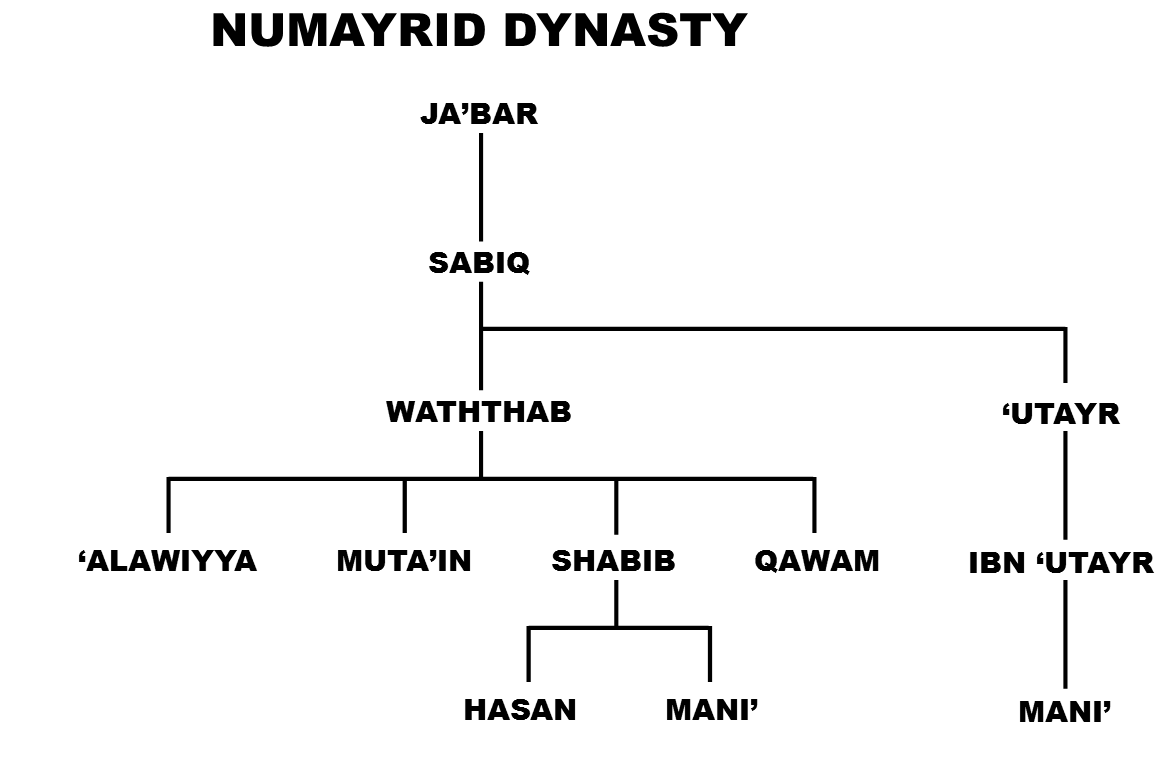
Numayrid family tree

Once in power, the Numayrids resolved to protect, govern and tax the communities inhabiting the agricultural territories and towns they controlled, rather than plunder them. This made them similar to the Bedouin tribes of Banu Kilab in northern Syria and the Uqaylids in Diyar Rabi'a. In contrast, other Bedouin contemporaries of the Numayrids, particularly the Jarrahids in Transjordan and Palestine, pillaged their territory and consistently attacked the populace. Nonetheless, the Numayrids retained aspects of their nomadic lifestyle, including an apprehension to living in urban environments. As such, Numayrid emirs and chieftains refrained from residing within the cities they controlled; instead, they formed mini-principalities in the countryside surrounding their respective strongholds. Administration over the cities, including taxation, was entrusted to a deputy who ruled in the emir's name. The deputy was typically a ghulām. An exception to this system was Mani', who resided in Harran itself. According to Heidemann,

The building activities in Harran and probably those in Raqqa are proof that Mani' did not regard cities only as places for fiscal exploitation. He also wanted to present himself within the city as an urban ruler, while maintaining his powerbase, the Banu Numayr, in the pasture.

The Numayrids, like their Marwanid neighbors, used the title of amir (prince). The Numayrid emirs Shabib and Mani' also used the Fatimid-influenced titles ṣanīʿat ad-dawla and najīb ad-dawla, respectively. They likely adopted these titles during periods of formal allegiance with the Fatimids. The Numayrids established mints at Harran, and under Mani', at Raqqa as well. The names of the ruling Numayrid emirs were named on the coins, which in the medieval Islamic era symbolized sovereign rulership.

=== Architectural legacy ===
In 1059, during his zenith, Mani' transformed the Sabian temple of Harran into an ornate, fortified residence. Excavations of Harran's modern citadel revealed that Mani's construction partly consisted of two small, square basalt towers connected to each other by a decorated arch. Fragments of a Kufic inscription found at a basaltic block at the citadel indicates the palace's construction in 1059. Rice states that the inscription represents the "oldest Islamic text so far found at Harran and the only surviving epigraphic document of the Numairid dynasty".

Heidemann holds that there was likely building activity during Mani's reign in Raqqa and the adjacent town of al-Rafiqah, including the possible restoration of a congregational mosque in the latter town. However, there are no specifically identifiable traces of Numayrid construction in Raqqa/al-Rafiqah.

=== Religion ===
Like the Hamdanids, Fatimids, and Banu Kilab/Mirdasids, much of the Banu Numayr followed Shia Islam. Initially, they paid formal allegiance to the Sunni Muslim Abbasid Caliphate, but during Shabib's last years, they switched to the Shia Muslim Fatimid Caliphate. Under Mani', the Numayrids reverted to the Abbasids, then recognized the Fatimids in 1056–1059 before once again nominally returning to the Abbasid fold.

== Bibliography ==
- Bianquis, T. (2002). "Waththab b. Sabik al-Numayri". In Bearman, P. J.; Bianquis, Th.; Bosworth, C. E.; van Donzel, E. & Heinrichs, W. P. (eds.). The Encyclopaedia of Islam, Second Edition. Volume XI: W–Z. Leiden: E. J. Brill. ISBN 978-90-04-12756-2.
- Bosworth, C.E. (1996). The New Islamic Dynasties: A Chronological and Genealogical Manual. New York: Columbia University Press. p. 93. ISBN 978-0-231-10714-3.
- Della Vida, G.L. (1995). "Numayr". In Bosworth, C. E.; van Donzel, E.; Heinrichs, W. P. & Lecomte, G. (eds.). The Encyclopaedia of Islam, Second Edition. Volume VIII: Ned–Sam. Leiden: E. J. Brill. p. 120. ISBN 978-90-04-09834-3.
- Green, Tamara M. (1992). The City of the Moon God: Religious Traditions of Harran. Leiden: Brill. ISBN 978-90-04-09513-7.
- Heidemann, S. (2005). "Numayrid Raqqa: Archaeological and Historical Evidence of a 'Dimorphic State' in the Bedouin Fringes of the Fatimid Empire". In Vermeulen, U.; Van Steenbergen, J. (eds.). Egypt and Syria in the Fatimid, Ayyubid and Mamluk Eras, Volume 4. Leuven, Dudley: Peeters Publishers.
- Heidemann, S. (2006). "The Citadel of Raqqa and Fortifications in the Middle Euphrates Area". In Kennedy, Hugh N. (ed.). Muslim Military Architecture in Greater Syria: From the Coming of Islam to the Ottoman Period. Leiden: Brill. ISBN 978-90-04-14713-3.
- Ibn al-Athir (2010). Richards, D. S. (ed.). The Chronicle of Ibn Al-Athir for the Crusading Period from Al-Kamil Fi'l-Ta'rikh.: The Years 491-541/1097-1146: The Coming of the Franks and the Muslim Response. Ashgate Publishing. ISBN 9780754669500.
- Rice, D. S. (1952). "Medieval Ḥarrān: Studies on Its Topography and Monuments, I". Anatolian Studies. 2: 36–84. doi:10.2307/3642366. JSTOR 3642366.
- Lloyd, S.; Brice, W. (1951). "Harran". Anatolian Studies. 1: 77–111. doi:10.2307/3642359. JSTOR 3642359.
- Sinclair, T. A. (1990). Eastern Turkey: An Architectural & Archaeological Survey, Volume IV. London: The Pindar Press. ISBN 978-0-907132-52-3.
- Zakkar, Suhayl (1971). The Emirate of Aleppo: 1004–1094. Aleppo: Dar al-Amanah.
