= Christopher Melchert =

American professor and scholar of Islam (born 1992)

Christopher Melchert is an American professor and scholar of Islam, specialising in Islamic movements and institutions, especially during the ninth and tenth centuries. A prolific author, he is professor of Arabic and Islamic studies at the University of Oxford's Oriental Institute, and is a Fellow in Arabic at Pembroke College, Oxford.

Melchert received a PhD in History (1992) from the University of Pennsylvania. His thesis was later published as a book, titled The Formation of the Sunni Schools of Law, with Brill Publishers, Leiden. Melchert more recently published a book on Ahmad ibn Hanbal, the Sunni hadith-scholar and jurist.

Having written about whether women can be prayer leaders according to the early Sunni and Shii jurists, he is one of the few expert historians who has written authoritatively on the question.

== Selected publications ==
- The Formation of the Sunni Schools of Law, 9th-10th Centuries C.E. (Studies in Islamic law and society, v. 4). Leiden: Brill, 1997.
  - Reviewed by W. B. Hallaq in International Journal of Middle East Studies 31, no. 2, (1999): 278–280
  - Reviewed by P. Sanders in American Journal of Legal History 43, Part 1 (1999): 98
- Ahmad ibn Hanbal. Oxford: Oneworld, 2006 and 2012. (in 116 World Cat libraries)
- Before Sufism: Early Islamic Renunciant Piety (De Gruyter, 2020) ISBN 9783110616514

=== Academia ===
- The formation of the Sunni schools of law, ninth–tenth centuries AD. 1992 Ph.D. thesis, University of Pennsylvania
- Religious Policies of the Caliphs from al-Mutawakkil to al-Muqtadir, AH 232-295/AD 847-908, in Islamic Law and Society, 1996 - Brill
- The transition from asceticism to mysticism at the middle of the ninth century AD, in Studia Islamica, 1996 - JSTOR
- The adversaries of Ahmad ibn Hanbal, in Arabica, 1997 - Springer
- Islamic law, in Oklahoma City University Law Review, 1998 - HeinOnline
- How Hanafism Came to Originate in Kufa and Traditionalism in Medina, in Islamic Law and Society, 1999 - Brill
- Ibn Mujāhid and the establishment of seven Qur'anic readings, in Studia Islamica, 2000 - JSTOR
- Traditionist-jurisprudents and the Framing of Islamic Law, in Islamic Law and Society, 2001 - Brill
- The Ḥanābila and the Early Sufis, in Arabica, 2001 - JSTOR
- Sufis and competing movements in Nishapur, in Iran, 2001 - JSTOR
- Various additional papers. (Note: Melchert's additional works include: Bukhārī and Early Hadith Criticism, in Journal of the American Oriental Society, 2001 - JSTOR; The piety of the Hadith folk, in International Journal of Middle East Studies, 2002 - Cambridge University Press; Qur'anic Abrogation Across the Ninth Century, in Studies in Islamic Legal Theory, 2002 - Brill; Early renunciants as Hadīth transmitters, in The Muslim World, 2002 - Wiley Online Library; The early history of Islamic law, Method and Theory in the Study of Islamic Origins, 2003; Ahmad Ibn Hanbal and the Qur'an, in Journal of Qur'anic Studies, 2004 - JSTOR; The etiquette of learning in the early Islamic study circle, Law and Education in Medieval Islam, 2004 - E. J. W. Gibb Memorial Trust; Baṣran Origins of Classical Sufism, in Der Islam, 2005 - De Gruyter; The Musnad of Aḥmad ibn Ḥanbal: How It Was Composed and What Distinguishes It from the Six Books, in Der Islam, 2005 - De Gruyter; Whether to Keep Women out of the Mosque: A Survey of Medieval Islamic Law, in UEAI 22, 2006 - Peeters Publishers; The Relation of the Ten Readings to One Another / العلاقة بين القراءات العشر, in Journal of Qur'anic Studies, 2008 - JSTOR; Aḥmad Ibn Ḥanbal's Book of Renunciation, in Der Islam, 2011 - De Gruyter; List of recent publications, including three in 2011, one in 2012, four in 2013, five in 2014, four in 2015.)
