= Qal'at Najm =

Castle near Manbij, Syria

- قلعة نجم
- Aleppo Governorate, Syria
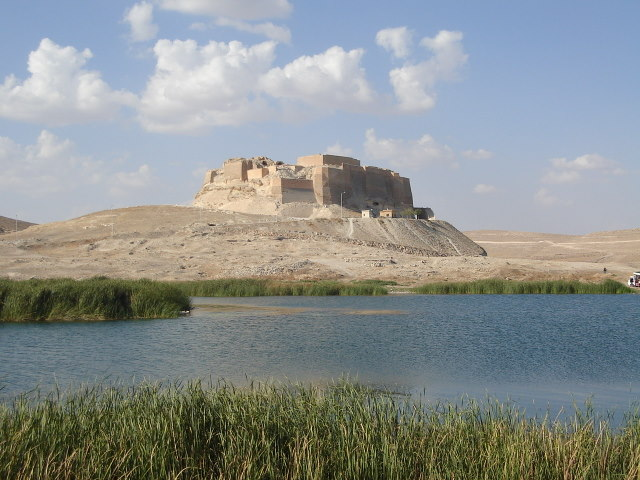
- View of Qal'at Najm from the south; the waters of the Tishrin Dam reservoir can be seen in front

Site information
- Type: Castle
- Open to the public: Yes
- Condition: Partially restored ruin

Location
- Location of Qal'at Najm
- Coordinates: 36.555°N 38.261667°E

Garrison information
- Past commanders: Az-Zahir Ghazi

Qal'at Najm (Arabic: قلعة نجم) is a castle located on the right bank of the Euphrates, near the town of Manbij in north Syria. The castle probably stood on the site of an earlier Roman site and is known from Arabic texts since the 7th century CE. Reconstruction works were carried out in the castle by Nur ad-Din Zangi and Az-Zahir Ghazi during the 12th and early 13th centuries. The castle sits on a mound that is protected by a glacis and houses a palace-bath complex and a mosque.

== History ==
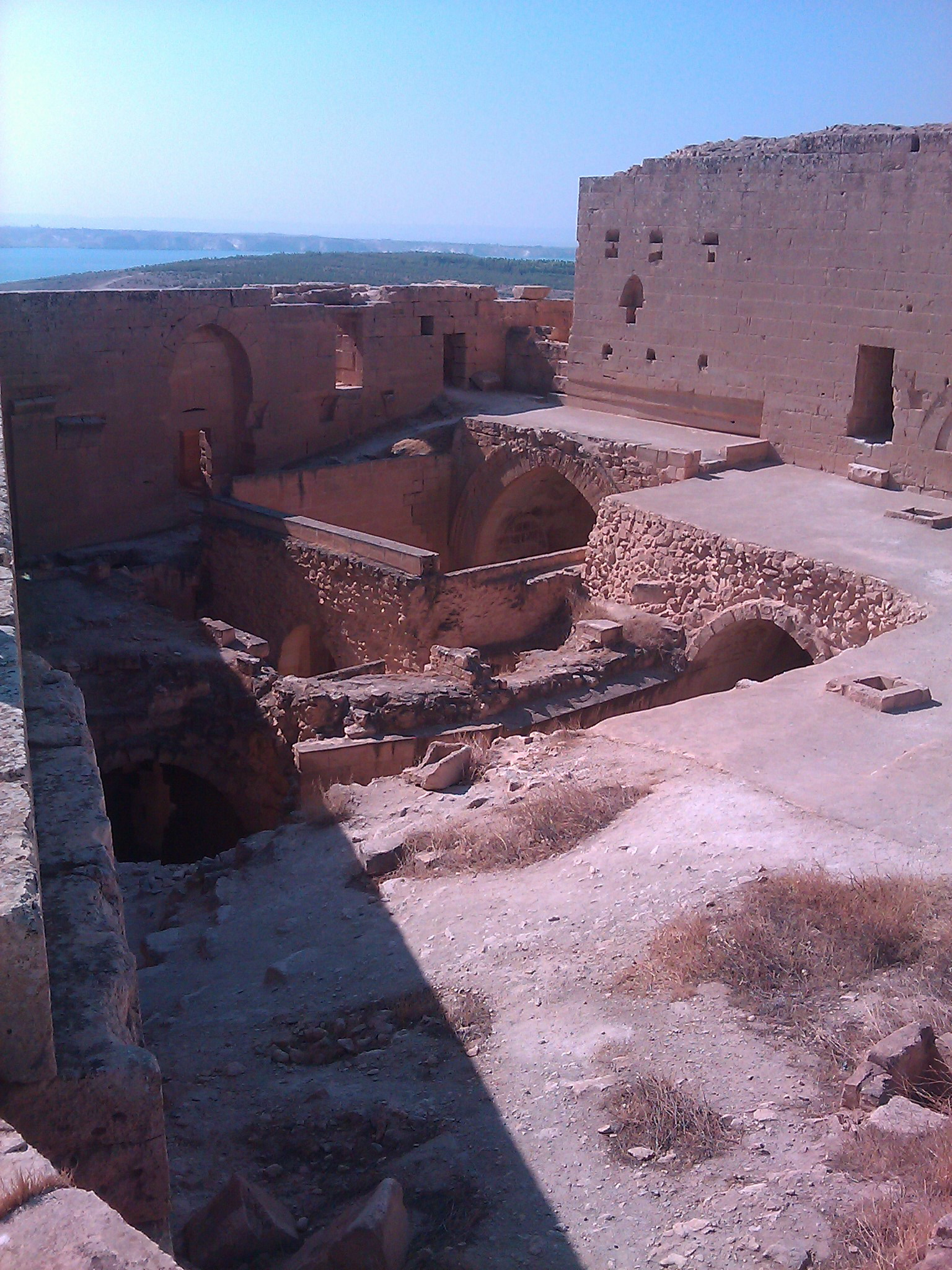
Qal'at Najm from the inside.

The castle probably stood on the location of an earlier Roman site, the name of which has not yet been identified, although Caeciliana has been suggested. The oldest reference to Qal'at Najm in Arabic texts is Jisr Manbij, while the current name came only into popular use in the 12th century CE. According to one text, Caliph Uthman had a bridge constructed over the Euphrates at Jisr Manbij. Following the conquest of the region by the Umayyads, the castle was controlled by the Hamdanids and the Mirdasid dynasty, before passing into the hands of the nomadic tribe of the Banu Numayr. The castle served as a stronghold for the Banu Numayr, who also controlled Qal'at Ja'bar, until at least 1120. Control then shifted to the Zengid dynasty under Nur ad-Din, ruler of Aleppo and the son of Zengi. Nur ad-Din had the castle restored. In 1202, Az-Zahir Ghazi, the Ayyubid governor of Aleppo from 1186 to 1216, attacked the Jezirah and conquered Manbij, Qal'at Najm and Qal'at Ja'bar, pushing on to Ra's al-'Ayn on the Khabur in northeast Syria. After this campaign, Az-Zahir refortified many of the places he had conquered, including Qal'at Najm. In 1820, an Arab warlord sought refuge in the castle, which was subsequently besieged and damaged by Ottoman forces.

On 1 June 2016, during the Syrian Civil War, the SDF captured Qal'at Najm from ISIS.

== Description ==
The castle is located on the right bank of the Euphrates, at a site where two islands allowed the construction of a pontoon bridge which carried a trade route from Aleppo to Harran over the Euphrates. Qal'at Najm is a castle of the truncated cone type, similar to the Citadel of Aleppo and those of Hama and Homs. It lies on a mound whose slopes were covered with an ashlar glacis, remains of which are still visible at Qal'at Najm. Also like the Citadel of Aleppo, its entrance is characterized by a ramp and a massive gate with four bends. At least three, and possibly a fourth, inscription dating to Az-Zahir's reign have been found at Qal'at Najm. Inside Qal'at Najm is a palace-bath complex, consisting of four wings opening to a central courtyard with a fountain. The castle also housed a mosque with an exterior double arcade looking out over the Euphrates. This architectural feature is very rare in mosques; another example can be seen in a mosque in the Alhambra in Spain. The town that lay at the foot of the castle, and that is mentioned in historical texts, has disappeared.

== See also ==
- List of castles in Syria
