= Citadel of Raqqa =

- Location within Syria
- 35°56′46″N 39°0′46″E
- Location: Raqqa, Syria

The Citadel of Raqqa was a medieval fortress located at the southwestern corner of al-Rāfiqa, the Abbasid-era section of Raqqa, Syria.

== History ==
Likely built in the 8th or 9th century, the citadel, historically known as Ḥiṣn al-Rāfiqa, played a key role in the city's defense and administration. Several 19th- and 20th-century explorers and scholars referenced or visited the citadel. Francis Rawdon Chesney and William Francis Ainsworth mentioned it during the Euphrates Expedition in the 1830s, though with limited detail. Eduard Sachau noted the site in 1879, while Friedrich Sarre and Ernst Herzfeld surveyed the area in the early 1900s. In 1913, Max von Oppenheim photographed the remains of the northwestern tower—locally known as al-qulla, providing one of the few surviving visual records of the citadel before its destruction. Gertrude Bell also passed through the area and misidentified the visible tower ruins in her 1911 travel writings. Later, Michael Meinecke, a leading researcher of Abbasid Raqqa, was aware of the citadel but mistakenly identified it as a later Ottoman structure and excluded it from his archaeological maps. However, early travel accounts, historical aerial photographs, and the detailed research of Stefan Heidemann had helped reconstruct the citadel's layout, context, and historical significance.

By the early 20th century, only parts of the northeastern and northwestern towers remained. The site was completely demolished in the 1950s during urban development driven by the cotton boom. Today, the Clocktower Circle (Dawwār al-Sā‘a) covers the former location of the citadel.

== See also ==
- List of castles in Syria
