= Malarczyk =

Malarczyk is a Polish surname. Notable people with the surname include:

- Anthony Malarczyk (born 1975), Welsh racing cyclist
- Dorota Malarczyk (born 1966), Polish numismatist and Islamic scholar
- Piotr Malarczyk (born 1991), Polish footballer
