= Andreas Kaplony =

Swiss Islamic studies scholar

Andreas Kaplony (born 1960 in Heidelberg) is a Swiss Quranic studies and Islamic studies scholar.

In 1986, Andreas Kaplony obtained a licentiate in general history, Arabic language and literature and philosophy from the University of Zurich. From 1986 to 1990 he was a research assistant in the University Department of Ancient History. From 1990 to 1995 he was an assistant at the Institute for Islamic Studies at the University of Bern.

Kaplony completed his doctorate in 1994 in general history and Arabic language and literature at the University of Zurich:

Constantinople and Damascus. Legations and treaties between emperors and caliphs 639-750. Studies on customary international law and intercultural diplomacy

Kaplony received a scholarship from the Swiss National Science Foundation from 1995 to 1998, and spent two years researching at the British School of Archeology in Jerusalem, Israel. From 1998 to 1999 he was a research assistant in the project cataloging the manuscripts of the Burgerbibliothek Bern. From 1999 to 2000 he was a research associate in the DFG project Digitization of the Heidelberg Papyri at the Institute for Papyrology at the Ruprecht-Karls University in Heidelberg. Then, from 2000 to 2001, he had a habilitation scholarship from the University of Zurich. After gaining his habilitation in 2001 in Islamic Studies at the University of Zurich (The Ḥaram of Jerusalem (324-1099): Temple, Friday Mosque, Area of Spiritual Power) from 2001 to 2004 he was a research fellow of the Gerda Henkel Foundation with the project Hub of the Silk Road : the organization of trade in Central Asia (7th-16th centuries) and lecturer and associate professor at the Oriental Seminar of the University of Zurich. From 2004 to 2010 he taught as an assistant professor for Islamic Studies at the Oriental Department of the University of Zurich. After the Qualification aux fonctions d'enseignant chercheur (maître de conférences, professeur d'université), Paris. Since 2004 he has been a Member of the Board of Directors of the International Society for Arabic Papyrology. He has been a board member of the Swiss Asia Society since 2004.

Since 2004 Kaplony has been project leader of the Arabic Papyrology Database. In the 2005/2006 winter semester he taught as a visiting professor for modern history (with a focus on Islamic culture in the Mediterranean region) at the Institute for History at the University of Vienna.

From 2010 to 2011 he was a research assistant and lecturer for Arabic at the Oriental Department of the University of Zurich. Since 2011, he has been a W3 professor for Arabic and Islamic Studies at LMU Munich.

Since 2012 he has been co-editor of the journal Der Islam and the series Studies in the History and Culture of the Middle East.

In 2015/2016 he looked through the holdings of the Austrian National Library as part of the Papyri of the Early Arab Period Online project. He has been spokesman for the Munich Center for Islamic Studies since 2017. He has been President of the International Society for Arabic Papyrology since 2018.

== Publications ==
- Constantinople and Damascus. Legations and Treaties between Emperors and Caliphs 639-750. Studies in Customary International Law and Intercultural Diplomacy. Berlin 1996, ISBN 3-87997-260-5.
- The Haram of Jerusalem (324-1099). Temple, Friday Mosque, Area of Spiritual Power. Stuttgart 2002, ISBN 3-515-07901-7.
- Twenty-five Arabic documents from the Red Sea port of al-Quṣayr al-Qadīm (7th/13th centuries) [P.QuseirArab. II]. Edition, translation and commentary. Leiden 2014, ISBN 978-90-04-27753-3.
- as editor with Michael Marx: Qur'an quotations preserved on papyrus documents, 7th–10th centuries and the problem of Carbon dating early Qur'āns. Leiden 2019, ISBN 978-90-04-35891-1.
