= Diyar Mudar =

Medieval Arabic name of the westernmost of the three provinces of al-Jazira

Map of al-Jazira (Upper Mesopotamia) with its provinces in medieval times

Diyar Mudar (Arabic: دِيَارُ مُضَرَ, romanized: Diyār Muḍar, lit. 'abode of Mudar') is the medieval Arabic name of the westernmost of the three provinces of al-Jazira (Upper Mesopotamia), the other two being Diyar Bakr and Diyar Rabi'a. According to the medieval geographer al-Baladhuri, all three provinces were named after the main Arab tribes that settled there during the course of the early Muslim conquests of the 7th century. The Diyar Mudar was settled by the Mudar tribe.

Diyar Mudar encompasses the region on both banks of the middle course of the river Euphrates, from the area of Samosata to the town of Anah, and includes the area of the Balikh River and the lower reaches of the river Khabur. Its main cities were Raqqa in the south and Edessa (al-Ruha in Arabic) in the north, and other major cities included Harran, and Saruj (now Suruç).

== History ==
Geographically and politically, in early Islamic times the Diyar Mudar was usually part of al-Jazira. In the mid-10th century, the region came under Hamdanid control, and under Sayf al-Dawla it was detached from the Jazira and the Hamdanids of Mosul and subordinated to the northern Syria-based Emirate of Aleppo. In the same period, the region came under attack by the resurgent Byzantine Empire.

After the loss of control of the Hamdanids, the Diyar Mudar and its cities came under the sway of the Banu Numayr, with Waththab ibn Ja'bar al-Numayri becoming autonomous governor of Harran by 1002, while Edessa was conquered by the Byzantine Empire under George Maniakes in 1032. Thereafter the region became divided into a mostly Christian-ruled northern portion, subject to Armenian colonization, while the area from Harran to the Euphrates was dominated by Arab nomadic tribes. Seljuk raids began in the 1060s and 1070s but they could not take the region. After the battle of Manzikert, Philaretos Brachamios appointed Thoros as governor of Edessa and the Diyar Mudar, but Thoros retreated after some time to Melitene (though he was reappointed again as governor by the Seljuks in 1094).

By 1086, the Seljuk sultan Malik-Shah I had unified the province under his control. The advent of the Crusades re-established the division between a Christian north (the County of Edessa) and a Muslim south, which lasted until the mid-12th century. The Ayyubids gained control of the region under Saladin, and kept it until the Mongol invasion of the Levant in 1260.

== Sources ==
- Canard, Marius & Cahen, Claude (1965). "Diyār Bakr". In Lewis, B.; Pellat, Ch. & Schacht, J. (eds.). The Encyclopaedia of Islam, Second Edition. Volume II: C–G. Leiden: E. J. Brill. pp. 343–345. OCLC 495469475.
- Canard, Marius & Cahen, Claude (1965). "Diyār Mudar". In Lewis, B.; Pellat, Ch. & Schacht, J. (eds.). The Encyclopaedia of Islam, Second Edition. Volume II: C–G. Leiden: E. J. Brill. pp. 347–348. OCLC 495469475.
- Dadoyan, Seta B. (1 November 2012). The Armenians in the Medieval Islamic World: Armenian Realpolitik in the Islamic World and Diverging Paradigmscase of Cilicia Eleventh to Fourteenth C. Transaction Publishers. ISBN 978-1-4128-4782-7.
- Heidemann, Stefan (2002). Die Renaissance der Städte in Nordsyrien und Nordmesopotamien. Städtische Entwicklung und wirtschaftliche Bedingungen in ar-Raqqa und Harrān von der Zeit der beduinischen Vorherrschaft bis zu den Seldschuken. Islamic History and Civilization Studies and Texts 40 (in German). Leiden et al.: Brill.
- Heidemann, Stefan (2011). "The Agricultural Hinterland of Baghdad, al-Raqqa and Samarra': Settlement Patterns in the Diyar Muḍar.". Le Proche-Orient de Justinien aux Abbasides. Peuplement et dynamiques spatiales. Actes du colloque "Continuites de l'occupation entre les periodes byzantine et abbasside au Proche-Orient, VIe-IXe siecles" Paris, 18-20 octobre 2007. Bibliothèque de l’antiquitè tardive 19. Turnhout: Brepols. pp. 43–58.
