= Samir Shamma Prize =

The Samir Shamma Prize for Islamic Numismatics is a bi-annual award for the best book or article in the field of Islamic Numismatics.

== History and purpose ==
The Royal Numismatic Society established the prize in 1992 following a legacy from Honorary fellow Samir Shamma. The prize of £2000 is awarded every two years for the book or article published within the previous three years that is considered the most useful to students of Islamic numismatics.

== List of winners ==
Past recipients of the Samir Shamma Prize.

- 1993 Gert Rispling ("The Volgar Bulgarian imitative coinage of al-amir Yaltawar ('Barman') and Mikail b. Jafar", in kenneth Jonnson (ed.): Sigtuna Papers New series 6, Stockholm, 1990)
- 1995 Lutz Ilisch (Sylloge Nummorum Arabicorum Tuebingen. Palaestina IVa Bilad ash-Sham I, Tuebingen, 1993)
- 1997 Hodge M. Malek (papers on Tabari dirhams) and Robert and Monika Tye (Jitals, South Uist, 1995)
- 1999 Nayef G. Goussous (Umayyad Coinage of Bilad al-Sham, Amman, 1996)
- 2000 Stephen Album (Sylloge of Islamic Coins in the Ashmolean Museum, 10 : Arabia and East Africa, Oxford, 1999)
- 2003 Stan Goron and J. Goenka (The Coins of the Indian Sultanates, New Delhi, 2001)
- 2005 Stefan Heidemann (numismatic contributions to Raqqa in S. Heidemann - A Becker (eds.): Die Islamische Stadt, Mainz, 2003) and Stephen Album and Anthony Goodwin (Sylloge of Islamic Coins in the Ashmolean Museum, 1: The Pre-Reform Coinage of the Early Islamic Period, Oxford, 2002)
- 2007 Aman ur-Rahman (Zahir uddin Mahammad Babur. A Numismatic Study, Karachi, 2005) and Jere Bacharach (Islamic History Through Coins: an Analysis and Catalogue of Tenth-century Ikshidid Coinage, Cairo and New York, 2006)
- 2009 Anthony Goodwin (Studies in the Khalili Collection, IV: Arab-Byzantine Coinage, London, 2005)
- 2012 Giulio Bernardi (Arabic Gold Coins. Corpus, vol. I, Trieste, 2010
- 2020 Dorota Malarczyk
