= Journal of the International Qur'anic Studies Association =

Academic journal on religion

- Discipline: Quranic studies
- Language: English, Arabic
- Edited by: Sean W. Anthony

Publication details
- History: 2013–present
- Publisher: Walter de Gruyter
- Frequency: Annually

Standard abbreviations
- ISO 4: J. Int. Qur'anic Stud. Assoc.

Indexing
- ISSN: 2474-8390 (print); 2474-8420 (web)

Links
- Journal homepage

The Journal of the International Qur'anic Studies Association (JIQSA) is an annual peer-reviewed academic journal covering research in the area of Quranic studies. The journal is published by Walter de Gruyter. The current editor-in-chief is Sean W. Anthony (Ohio State University). The journal also includes the Review of Qur'anic Research (RQR), covering book reviews of recent works in the field.

== Abstracting and indexing ==
The journal is abstracted and indexed in:

- CNKI Scholar (China National Knowledge Infrastructure)
- CNPIEC - cnpLINKer
- Dimensions
- EBSCO Discovery Service
- Google Scholar
- J-Gate
- Naver Academic
- Naviga (Softweco)
- Primo Central (ExLibris)
- ReadCube
- ScienceON (Korea Institute of Science and Technology Information)
- Scilit
- Semantic Scholar
- Summon (ProQuest)
- TDNet
- WanFang Data
- WorldCat (OCLC)
- X-MOL
- Yewno Discover

== See also ==
- Der Islam
- Journal of Qur'anic Studies
