= Hugh N. Kennedy =

British medieval historian and academic (born 1947)

Hugh N. Kennedy FRSE FRAS FBA
- Born: 22 October 1947 (age 78); Hythe, Kent, England
- Education: University of Cambridge (BA, PhD)
- Spouse: Hilary Wybar (m. 1970)
- Awards: FRSE (2000); FBA (2012)
- Scientific career
- Workplaces: University of St Andrews; School of Oriental and African Studies, University of London
- Thesis: Politics and the political élite in the early Abbasid Caliphate (1978)

Hugh Nigel Kennedy (born 22 October 1947) is a British medievalist and academic. He specialises in the history of the early Islamic Middle East, Muslim Iberia and the Crusades. From 1997 to 2007, he was Professor of Middle Eastern History at the University of St Andrews. Since 2007, he has been Professor of Arabic at SOAS, University of London.

== Early life and education ==
Kennedy was born on 22 October 1947 in Hythe, Kent, England. He spent a year 1965-6 studying at the Middle East Centre for Arab Studies at Shemlan in Lebanon; he had received a scholarship from the British Foreign Office. From 1966 to 1969, he studied at Pembroke College, Cambridge. He studied Arabic and Persian for Part 1 of the Tripos (achieving a 2:1), and history for Part II (achieving a first). He graduated from the University of Cambridge with a Bachelor of Arts (BA) degree in 1969.

From 1969 to 1972, he was a postgraduate student within the Faculty of Oriental Studies, University of Cambridge. He completed his Doctor of Philosophy (PhD) degree in 1978 with a doctoral thesis titled Politics and the political élite in the early Abbasid Caliphate.

== Academic career ==
In 1972, Kennedy joined the University of St Andrews as a Lecturer in Mediaeval History. He was promoted to Reader in 1990. He was appointed Professor of Middle Eastern History in 1997. He held a number of academic administration appointments at St Andrews: he was Deputy Head of the School of History from 1992 to 1998, and was Dean of the Faculty of Arts from 1995 to 1998.

In 2007, he left the University of St Andrews to join the School of Oriental and African Studies (SOAS), University of London. He was appointed Professor of Arabic at SOAS. From January 2015 to January 2018, he was leading a project at SOAS titled Economic integration and social change in the Islamic world system, 800-1000CE; it is being funded by the Leverhulme Trust.

Among his research topics is the History of the Islamic Middle East, Islamic Archaeology and Muslim Iberia.

== Personal life ==
In 1970, Kennedy married Hilary Wybar. They have four children; one son and three daughters. One of their daughters has pre-deceased her parents.

== Honours ==
In 2000, Kennedy was elected a Fellow of the Royal Society of Edinburgh (FRSE). In July 2012, he was elected a Fellow of the British Academy (FBA). He is also a Fellow of the Royal Asiatic Society (FRAS).

== Bibliography ==
- 1981, The Early Abbasid Caliphate: a Political History (Barnes and Noble, London and New York). (ISBN 978-0389200185)
- 1986, The Prophet and the Age of the Caliphates, 600–1050 (London, Longman) (ISBN 0-582-49312-9)
- 1990, (Editor and translator) Al-Mansur and al-Mahdi; being an annotated translation of vol. xxix of the History of al-Tabari (Albany, State University of New York Press) (ISBN 0-7914-0142-1)
- 1994, Crusader Castles (Cambridge, Cambridge University Press) (ISBN 0 521 42068 7)
- 1996, Muslim Spain and Portugal: a political history of Al-Andalus (London, Longman) (ISBN 0 582 299683)
- 1998, Egypt as a Province in the Islamic Caliphate, 641–868 // The Cambridge History of Egypt: Vol. 1: Islamic Egypt / edited by Carl F. Petry (Cambridge, Cambridge University Press) ISBN 978 0 521 47137 4
- 2001, The Armies of the Caliphs: military and society in the early Islamic State (London, Routledge) (ISBN 0 415 25092 7)
- 2001, The Historiography of Islamic Egypt, c. 950—1800, editor (Leiden and Boston: Brill) (ISBN 978-9-004-11794-5)
- 2003, Mongols, Huns and Vikings: Nomads at War (London, Cassell) (ISBN 0 304 35292 6)
- 2004, Revised ed. of The Prophet and the Age of the Caliphates, 600–1050 (Harlow, Longman) (ISBN 0 582 40525 4)
- 2004, The Court of the Caliphs (London, Weidenfeld and Nicolson) (ISBN 0 297 83000 7)
- 2006, The Byzantine and Early Islamic Near East (Variorum Collected Studies Series) (Farnham, Ashgate Publishing) (ISBN 0 754 65909 7)
- 2005, When Baghdad Ruled the Muslim World: The Rise and Fall of Islam's Greatest Dynasty (Cambridge, MA, Da Capo Press) (ISBN 0 306 81435 8)
- 2007, The Great Arab Conquests. How the Spread of Islam Changed the World We Live In. (London, Weidenfeld and Nicolson) (ISBN 0 297 84657 4)
- 2008, The Muslims in Europe // The New Cambridge Medieval History: Vol. 2: c.700 — c.900 (Second ed.) / edited by Rosamond McKitterick (Cambridge, Cambridge University Press) ISBN 978-0-521-36292-4
- 2010, The Late ʿAbbasid Pattern, 945–1050 // The New Cambridge History of Islam: Vol. 1: The Formation of the Islamic World, Sixth to Eleventh Centuries / edited by Chase F. Robinson (Cambridge, Cambridge University Press) ISBN 978 0 521 83823 8
- 2013, Warfare and Poetry in the Middle East (London, Bloomsbury Publishing) ISBN 0 857 73437 7
- 2013, Crisis and Continuity at the Abbasid Court, with Maaike van Berkel, Nadia Maria El Cheikh and Letizia Osti (Leiden, Brill Publishers) ISBN 978 90 04 25271 4
- 2016, Caliphate: The History of an Idea. (New York, Basic Books) ISBN 978 0 465 09439 4
- 2016, The Caliphate: A Pelican Introduction. (London, Penguin) (ISBN 978-0141981406)
- 2020, The Rise and Fall of the Early ʿAbbāsid Political and Military Elite // Transregional and Regional Elites – Connecting the Early Islamic Empire (Studies in the History and Culture of the Middle East, vol. 36) / edited by Hannah-Lena Hagemann, Stefan Heidemann (Berlin, Walter de Gruyter GmbH & Co KG) ISBN 978 3 110 66656 4
- 2022, (Editor and translator) History of the Arab Invasions : the Conquest and Administration of Empire (London: I.B. Tauris) (ISBN 978-0-755-63743-0)
- 2023, Land and Trade in Early Islam: The Economy of the Islamic Middle East 750-1050 CE, editor with Fanny Bessard (Oxford University Press) ISBN 978-0-198-86308-3
