= Hama Castle =

Fortress in Hama, Syria

Hama Castle قلعة حماة
- Hama, Syria
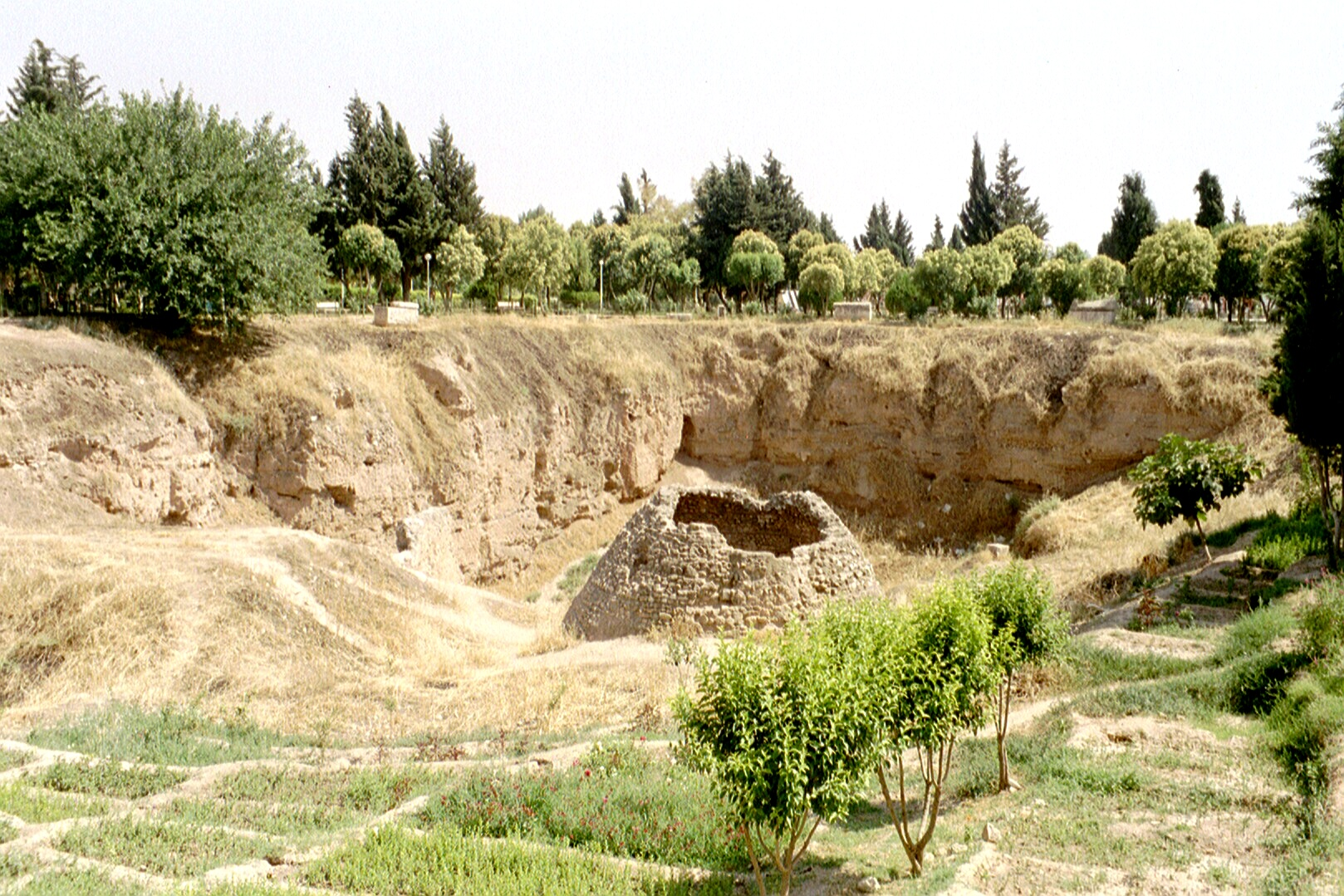
- Excavation area inside Hama Citadel

Site information
- Condition: Ruins

Location
- Coordinates: 35.1365°N 36.75°E

Hama Castle (Arabic: قلعة حماة) is a mostly-ruined fortress located in Hama, Syria, Located on the Orontes River.

== History ==
The location is dated back to the Seleucids. Later on, it was taken by the Romans, until it was captured by Abu Ubaidah ibn al-Jarrah. It was later controlled by the Qarmatians, Mirdasids and the Seljuks.

It was devastated during the 1157 Hama earthquake. Afterwards, it was rebuilt by the Zengids and Ayyubids, before it was destroyed by the Mongols in 1258. Sultan Baibars rebuilt it again, and by the Ottoman era, it had lost its strategic value and barely anything of it was left.

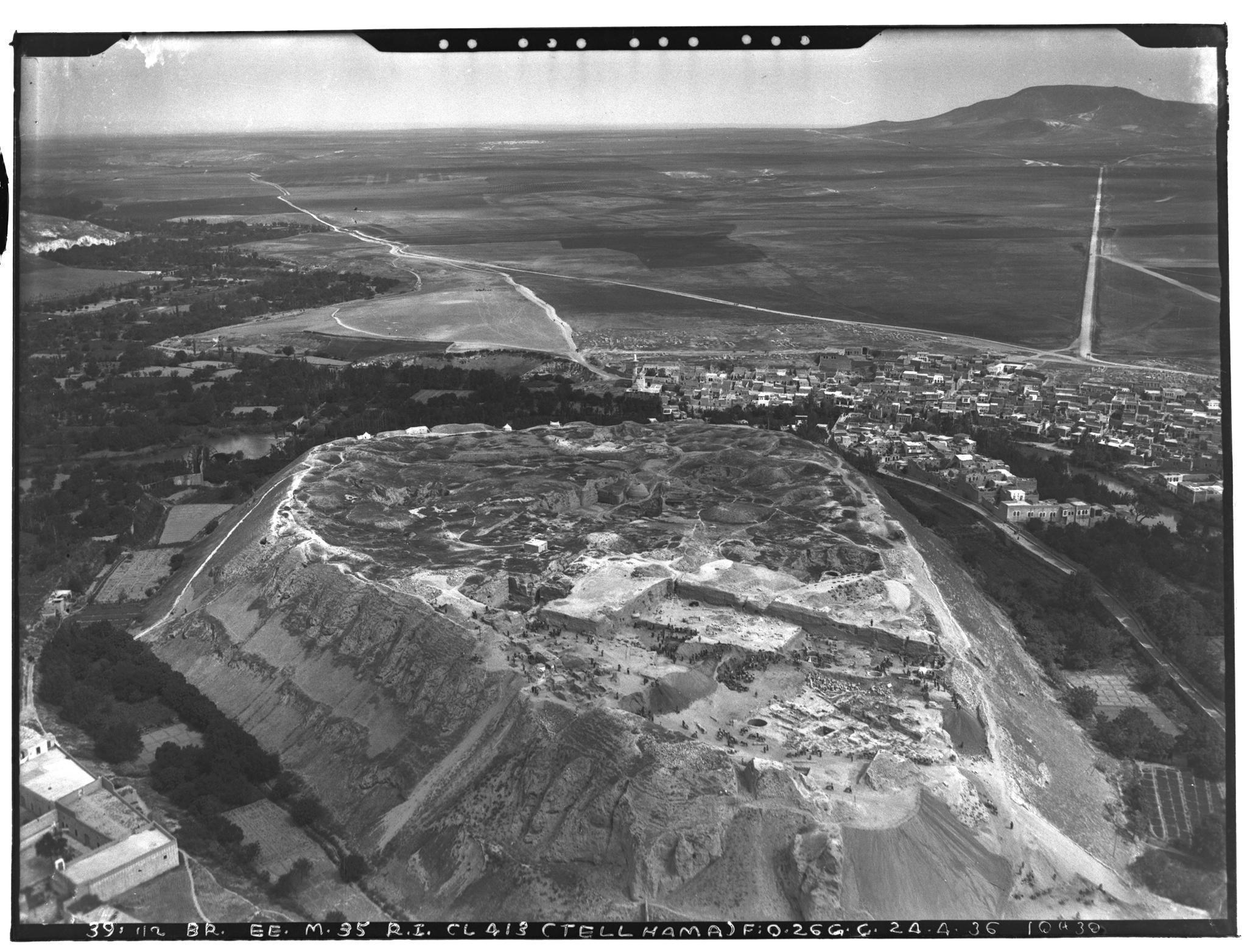
1936 aerial view of the castle.

It was excavated by a Danish expedition between 1931 and 1938.

== See also ==
- List of castles in Syria

== Sources ==
- Shaw, Ian; Jameson, Robert (2008) [1999]. A Dictionary of Archaeology. John Wiley & Sons. ISBN 978-0-470-75196-1.
