= List of castles in Syria =

This is a list of castles in Syria.

== Key ==
Key
Name	Name of the surviving building, either how it is popularly known in English, its medieval name or its Arabic name
Type	Usually the type of castle represented by the predominant surviving fortified remains
Date	Usually the dates of the principal building works relating to the surviving remains
Condition	An indication as to what remains of the original castle structure
Image	Building or site as it currently exists
Coordinates	Location of the castle
Governorate	Governorate in which the castle is located
Notes	Brief description or information of note

== List of castles ==
Located under Israeli occupation.

Name	Type	Date	Condition	Image	Coordinates	Governorate	Notes
Citadel of Aleppo	Castle	12th–13th centuries	Partially restored		36°11′57″N 37°09′45″E	Aleppo	Covers an ancient tell with remains dating back to the 3rd millennium BCE.
Qal'at Najm	Hilltop castle	12th–13th centuries	Partially restored		36°33′18″N 38°15′42″E	Aleppo	Besieged in 1820 by Ottoman forces after a local warlord had sought refuge in the castle.
Citadel of Damascus	Castle	11th–13th centuries	Partially restored		33°30′42″N 36°18′7″E	Damascus	Part of the Ancient City of Damascus World Heritage Site.
Citadel of Bosra	Castle		Partially restored		32°31′04″N 36°28′54″E	Daraa	Built around a Roman theatre. Part of the Ancient City of Bosra World Heritage Site.
Jableh Castle	Castle	11th-13th centuries	Partially restored		35.362°N 35.924°E	Jableh	Built around a Roman theatre under Crusader state Principality of Antioch.
Halabiye	Hilltop castle	6th century	Ruins		35°41′22″N 39°49′08″E	Deir ez-Zor	Originally fortified by Queen Zenobia of Palmyra, refortified under the Byzantine Emperor Justinian I and partially re-used after the Muslim conquest of Syria.
Qal'at Rahbeh	Hilltop castle		Ruins		35°00′18″N 40°25′24″E	Deir ez-Zor	Much of the current structure dates back to its construction by the Ayyubid lord, Shirkuh II, in 1207.
Qal'at Sukkara	Hilltop castle		Ruins		36°25′38″N 40°23′56″E	Al Hasakah	Located in the Jebel Abd al-Aziz.
Qalʿat Abū Qubais	Hilltop castle		Partially restored		35°14′05.9″N 36°19′50.8″E	Hama	
Citadel of Hama	Castle		Ruins		35°08′10″N 36°44′58″E	Hama	Excavated by a Danish expedition between 1931 and 1938.
Qalaat al-Madiq	Hilltop castle		Residential area		35°25′12″N 36°23′33″E	Hama	
Qal'at al-Rahiyya	Castle		Ruins		35°16′45″N 37°6′30″E	Hama	The castle dates back to the second millennium BC.
Masyaf Castle	Spur castle		Partially restored		35°03′58″N 36°20′36″E	Hama	
Shaizar	Spur castle		Partially restored		35°15′55″N 36°33′59″E	Hama	
Shmemis	Hilltop castle		Ruins		35°02′13″N 37°00′49″E	Hama	
Citadel of Homs	Castle		Ruins		34°43′25″N 36°42′52″E	Homs	Built on top of an ancient tell with remains dating back to the 3rd millennium BCE.
Fakhr-al-Din al-Maani Castle	Hilltop castle		Partially restored		34°33′46″N 38°15′25″E	Homs	
Qasr al-Hayr al-Gharbi	Desert castle		Ruins		34°22′28″N 37°36′21″E	Homs	
Qasr al-Hayr al-Sharqi	Desert castle		Ruins		35°4′26″N 39°4′16″E	Homs	
Krak des Chevaliers	Hilltop castle		Partially restored		34°45′25″N 36°17′4″E	Homs	Part of the Crac des Chevaliers and Qal'at Salah El-Din World Heritage Site.
Harem Castle	Hilltop castle		Ruins		36°12′27″N 36°31′09″E	Idlib	
Sarmada	Hilltop castle		Ruins		36°11′N 36°43′E	Idlib	
Bani Qahtan Castle	Hilltop castle		Ruins		35°23′44″N 36°09′15″E	Latakia	
Bourzey castle	Hilltop castle		Ruins		35°39′29″N 36°15′39″E	Latakia	
Mahalibeh Castle	Hilltop castle		Partially restored		35°30′28″N 36°05′14″E	Latakia	
Qal'at Salah ed-Din	Spur castle		Partially restored		35°35′45″N 36°03′26″E	Latakia	Part of the Crac des Chevaliers and Qal'at Salah El-Din World Heritage Site.
Nimrod Fortress	Hilltop castle	13th century			33°15′10″N 35°42′53″E	Quneitra	Located in the Golan Heights
Castle of al-Al	Castle					Quneitra	Located in the Golan Heights
Qasr Bardawil	Hilltop castle				32°49′11.23″N 35°44′32.57″E	Quneitra	Located in the Golan Heights
Citadel of Raqqa	Castle	13th century	Destroyed		35°56′4″N 39°00′5″E	Raqqa	The citadel was completely removed and built over in the 1950s.
Qal'at Ja'bar	Hilltop castle	12th century	Partially restored		35°53′51″N 38°28′51″E	Raqqa	Originally situated on a hilltop overlooking the Euphrates Valley but now turned into an island by the flooding of Euphrates Lake.
Jabal Sais	Desert castle/fortification	7th century	Ruins		33.266667°N 37.366667°E	Rif Dimashq	The fortification sits near an extinct volcano.
Salkhad Castle	Hilltop castle		Ruins		32°29′38″N 36°42′36″E	Suwayda	
Chastel Blanc	Hilltop castle		Partially restored		34°49′14″N 36°07′01″E	Tartus	
Chastel Rouge	Spur castle		Partially restored		34°48′44″N 35°58′14″E	Tartus	
Al-Kahf Castle	Spur castle	12th century	Ruins		35°02′27″N 36°04′58″E	Tartus	In 1192, Rashid ad-Din Sinan, also known as the Old Man of the Mountain, died in Al-Kahf Castle, which was an Ismaili stronghold during the 12th century.
Qala'at Khawabi	Spur castle		Residential area		34°58′22″N 36°00′06″E	Tartus	
Burj al-Sabi	Spur castle	12th century	Ruins		35°9′14″N 35°55′38″E	Tartus	Castle of Knights Hospitallers
Areimeh Castle	Spur castle	12th century	Ruins		34°44′40″N 36°02′33″E	Tartus	Castle of Knights Templar
Margat	Spur castle	11th–12th centuries	Partially restored		35°09′08″N 35°57′0″E	Tartus	Headquarters of the Knights Hospitaller in Syria.
Maraclea	Hilltop castle	11th century	Ruins		35°4′4″N 35°53′26″E	Tartus	Castle of Knights Hospitaller
Al-Qadmus Castle	Hilltop castle	11th–12th centuries	Ruins		35°6′5″N 36°9′40″E	Tartus	Crusader Castle
al-Sheikh Deeb Castle (Qulay'a)	Hilltop castle		Ruins		34°56′52″N 36°15′30″E	Tartus	
Citadel of Tartus	Castle		Residential area		34°53′36″N 35°52′35″E	Tartus	

== See also ==
- List of castles
- List of Crusader castles

== Sources ==
- Bounni, Adnan (1977), "Campaign and exhibition from the Euphrates in Syria", The Annual of the American Schools of Oriental Research, 44: 1–7, JSTOR 3768538
- Burns, R. (2009), The monuments of Syria. A guide, London: I.B. Tauris, pp. 160–161, ISBN 9781845119478
- Heidemann, Stefan (2006), "The Citadel of al-Raqqa and Fortifications in the Middle Euphrates Area", in Kennedy, Hugh (ed.), Muslim Military Architecture in Greater Syria: From the Coming of Islam to the Ottoman Period, History of Warfare, vol. 35, Leiden: Brill, pp. 122–150, ISBN 9004147136
- King, G.R.D. (2002), "Archaeological Fieldwork at the Citadel of Homs, Syria: 1995–1999", Levant, 34: 39–58, doi:10.1179/007589102790217336
- Shaw, Ian; Jameson, Robert (1999), A Dictionary of Archaeology, Oxford: Blackwell, ISBN 978-0631174233
- Sourdel, D. (2010), "Ķalat Nadjm", in Bearman, P.; Bianquis, Th.; Bosworth, C.E.; van Donzel, E.; Heinrichs, W.P. (eds.), Encyclopaedia of Islam, Second Edition, Leiden: Brill Online, OCLC 624382576
- Willey, Peter (2005), Eagle's Nest: Ismaili Castles in Iran and Syria, Institute of Ismaili Studies, I.B.Tauris, ISBN 9781850434641
