= Qulay'a =

Qulay'a قليعة Qulay'at, Qleiat
- Village
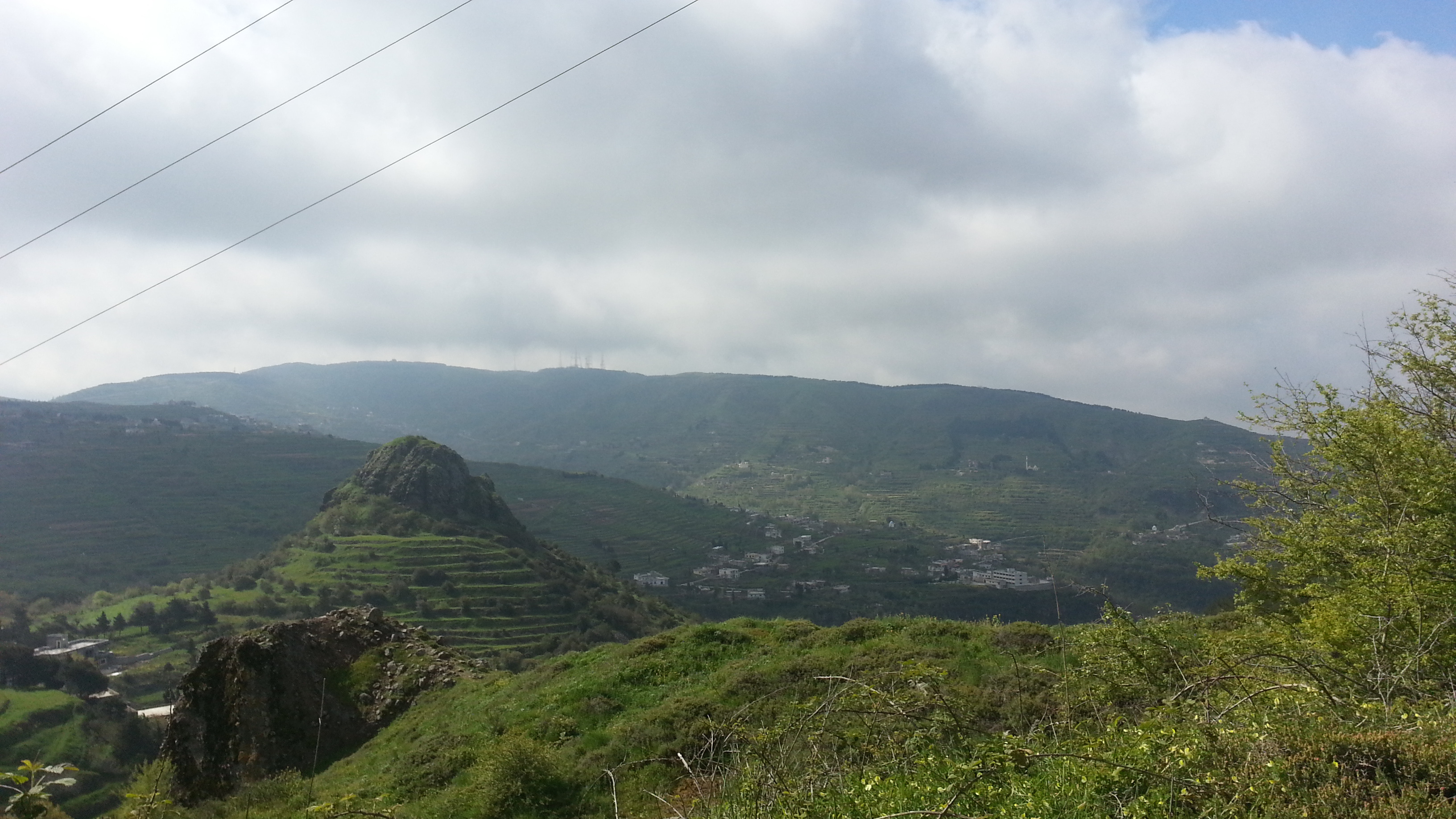
- The ruined hilltop fortress of Qulay'a and the modern village below, 2015

- Location within Syria
- Coordinates: 34°56′50″N 36°14′57″E
- Country: Syria
- Governorate: Tartus
- District: Duraykish
- Subdistrict: Dweir Ruslan

Population (2004 census)
  - Total: 1,360
- Time zone: UTC+2 (EET)
  - Summer (DST): UTC+3 (EEST)

Qulay'a (Arabic: قليعة, romanized: Qulayʾa), also transliterated Qulay'at or Qleiat) is a village and medieval citadel in northwestern Syria, administratively part of the Tartus Governorate. According to the Syria Central Bureau of Statistics, Qulay'a had a population of 1,360 in the 2004 census. The fortress of Qulay'a was one of the several held by the Nizari Ismaili state in the Syrian coastal mountains and is locally known as Al-Sheikh Deeb Castle (Arabic: قلعة الشيخ ديب, romanized: Qal'at Sheikh Dib). The fortress stands at an elevation of 730 meters (2,400 ft) above sea level.

== History ==
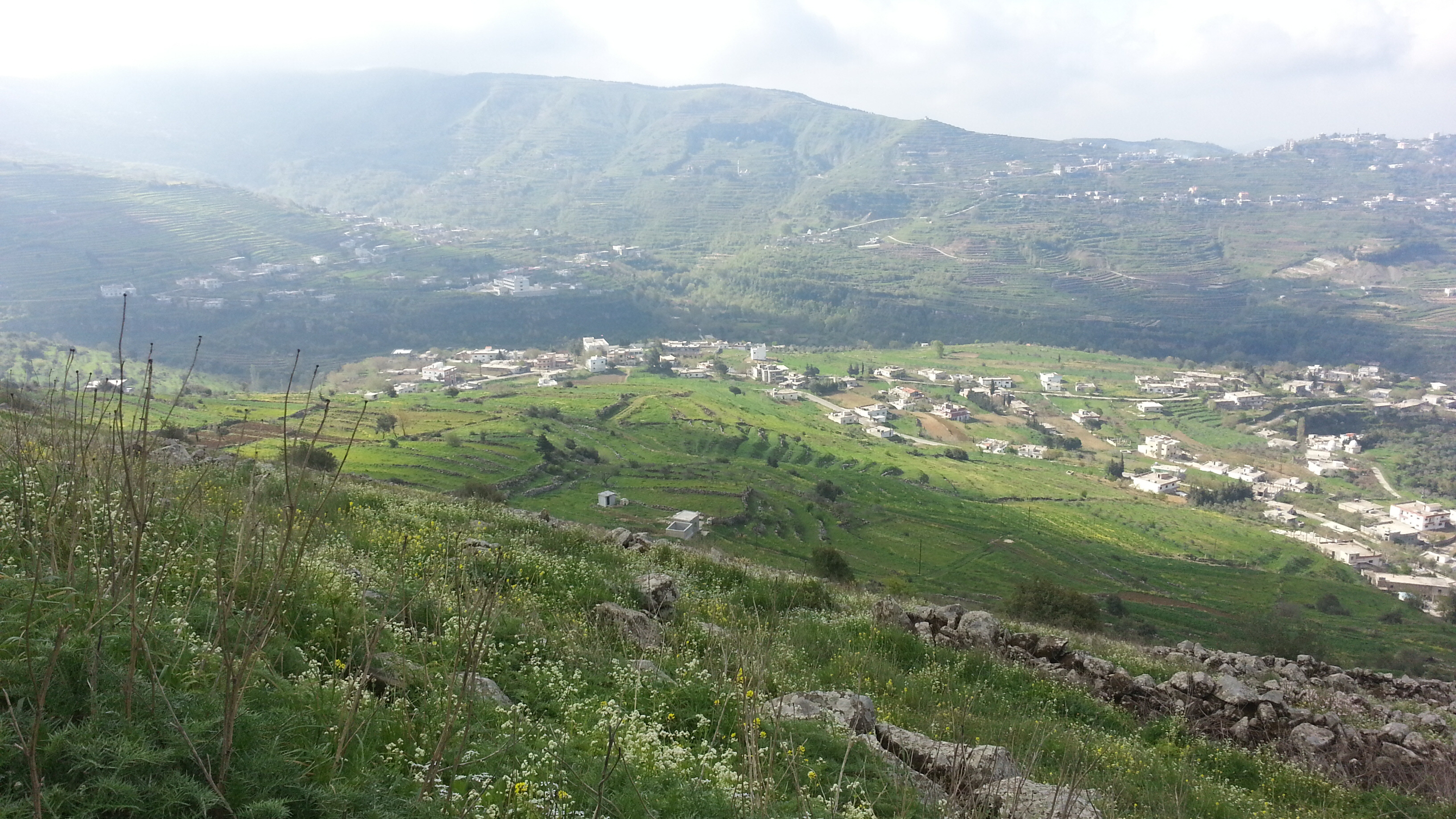
The village of Qulay'a, 2015

The Nizari Isma'ilis took control of Qulay'a around the time they came into control of Masyaf in 1140–1141. Between 1270 and 1273, Qulay'a was among several of the Nizari Isma'ili castles to have surrendered to the Mamluk sultan Baybars and annexed into the Mamluk realm.

During the Ottoman period, Qulay'a was the center of a minor nahiye (subdistrict) in the hill country west of Hama. It was mentioned in Ottoman tax records from 1547 and 1645. Unlike many other former Crusader or Nizari Isma'ili fortresses during that period, where the inhabitants of the fortress were Sunni Muslims or Isma'ili Shia Muslims amid a largely Alawite-populated countryside, by the 17th century the inhabitants of the Qulay'a castle itself were Alawites.

== See also ==
- List of castles in Syria

== Bibliography ==
- Daftary, Farhad (1990). The Isma'ilis: Their History and Doctrines. Cambridge University Press. ISBN 0-521-37019-1.
- Willey, Peter (2005). Eagle's Nest: Ismaili Castles in Iran and Syria. London and New York: I. B. Tauris. ISBN 1-85043-464-6.
- Winter, Stefan (2016). A History of the 'Alawis: From Medieval Aleppo to the Turkish Republic. Princeton and Oxford: Princeton University Press. ISBN 9780691167787.
