= Qal'at Sukkara =

Castle in Syria

- Location within Syria
- 36°30′36″N 40°27′36″E
- Location: Syria
- Region: Al-Hasakah Governorate

Qal'at Sukkara (Arabic: قلعة سكرة) is an Islamic Ayyubid castle located in Mount Abdulaziz in al-Hasakah Governorate, Syria. It was built in the 12th century CE to control the northern plain of the mountain.

== Geography ==
The fortress spans 220 meters by 150 meters, with many defensive towers and fortified walls along its perimeter.

== See also ==
- List of castles in Syria
