= Gérard Lecomte =

French linguist and Arabist (1926–1997)

Gérard Lecomte (1926 – 17 April 1997) was a French Arabist. He was professor of Arabic at the Institut national des langues et civilisations orientales, and editor of the journal Arabica and the second edition of the Encyclopaedia of Islam. He was honoured with the rank of knight of the Légion d'honneur. He is the father of the French journalist and writer Bernard Lecomte.

== Sources ==
- Troupeau, Gérard (1998). "Necrologie: Gérard Lecomte (1926-1997)". Arabica. 45 (3). Brill: 446–449. ISSN 0570-5398. JSTOR 4057326.
