= Jere L. Bacharach =

American historian (1938–2023)

- Born: November 18, 1938; New York, New York, U.S.
- Died: April 9, 2023 (aged 84)
- Occupation: Professor
- Years active: 1967-2023

Jere L. Bacharach (November 18, 1938 – April 9, 2023) was a Professor Emeritus, in the Department of History, University of Washington, Seattle, Washington.

== Academia ==
Born in New York, Bacharach attended Trinity College, receiving his B.A. in 1960, Harvard University receiving his M.A. in 1962, and the University of Michigan where he received his Ph.D. in 1967. He was a member of the University of Washington faculty from 1967-2023 having officially retired in 2004 although he taught his last class in the fall term, 2007. While a member of the University of Washington faculty, Bacharach served as Chair, Department of History; Director, Henry M. Jackson School of International Studies; and Interim Chair, Department of Near Eastern Languages and Civilization. He has also been President, Middle East Studies Association of North America, President, Middle East Medievalists (twice), and President, Association of Professional Schools of International Affairs. He has served in Cairo as Interim Director, American Research Center in Egypt and has held numerous other positions in various professional organizations.

== Publications ==
His publications have ranged from the architecture of power in the Islamic world to the use of African slaves in military Muslim armies. His primary work has been in the field of Islamic numismatics where he has published numerous articles on fifteenth century Circassian monetary developments and tenth century Ikhshidid coinage. The latter appeared as “Islamic History through Coins” [Cairo: AUC Press, 2006], which was the co-winner of the 2007 Samir-Shamma-Prize of the Royal Numismatic Society of Great Britain for the best book in Islamic numismatics during the preceding two years.

== Awards ==
Bacharach has twice been a Samir Shamma Fellow at the Ashmolean Museum, Oxford and at St. Cross College, Oxford University and in 2008 received a Mellon Foundation Emeritus Fellowship.

== Death ==
Jere L. Bacharach died on April 9,2023.
