= Carl Heinrich Becker =

German orientalist and politician (1876–1933)

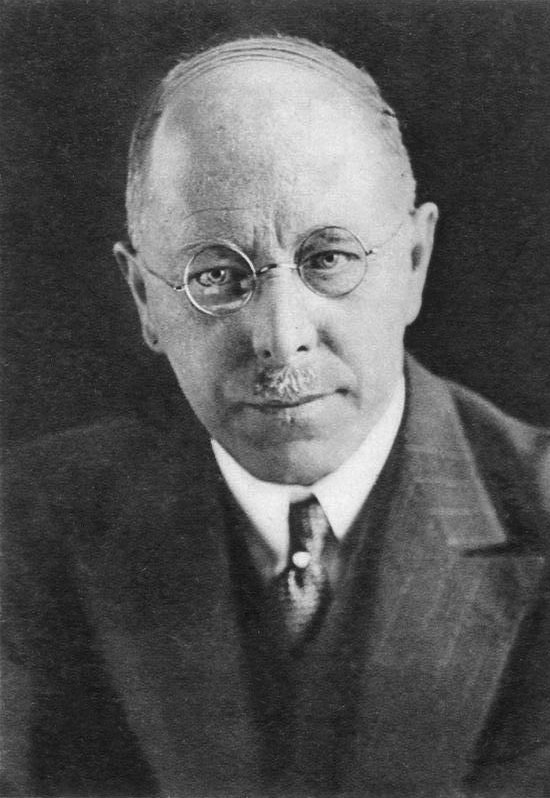
Carl Heinrich Becker

Carl Heinrich Becker (12 April 1876 – 10 February 1933) was a German orientalist and politician in Prussia. In 1921 and 1925–1930, he served as Minister for Culture in Prussia (independent). He was one of the founders of the study of the contemporary Middle East and a reformer of the system of higher education in the Weimar Republic.

== Early life and study ==
Becker was born in Amsterdam, the son of a banker. He attended universities at Lausanne, Heidelberg, and Berlin, and travelled in Spain, Sudan, Greece, and Turkey, before earning his doctorate in 1899.

== Academic career ==
In 1902, Becker became a Privatdozent for Semitic philology at the University of Heidelberg, where he came into contact with Max Weber. After his habilitation in 1908, he was appointed Professor of History and Culture of the Orient at the newly founded Hamburg Colonial Institute and Director of the Seminar for History and Culture of the Orient in Hamburg. In 1910, he founded Der Islam, a journal for the history and culture of the Middle East, and was its first editor. In 1913, he accepted an offer from Bonn University, where he was Professor of Oriental Philology.

Becker and his colleague Martin Hartmann were among the first to combine modern sociological thinking with Islamic studies. He was an opponent of the Kulturkreistheorie (theory of cultural circles) of Ernst Troeltsch.

== Political career ==
During the First World War, Becker began his work with the Prussian Ministry of Culture. In 1921 and 1925–1930, he served as Minister for Culture in Prussia (independent). He died in Berlin.

== Selected works ==
- Ibn Gauzi's Manaqib Omar Ibn' Abdelaziz (Dissertation, 1899)
- Beitrage zur Geschichte Agyptens unter dem Islam (2 vols., 1902- 1903)
- Papyri Schott-Reinhardt: Veroffentlichungen aus der Heidelberger Papyrus- Sammlung, Vol. 1 ( 1906)
- Der Kanzel im Kultus des alten Islam (1906)
- Christentum und Islam (1907)
- L'Islam et la Colonisation de l'Afrique (1910)
- Gedanken zur Hochschulreform (1919)
- Kulturpolitische Aufgaben des Reichs (1919)
- Kant und die Bildungskrise der Gegenwart (1924)
- Islamstudien: Vom Werden und Wesen der islamischen Welt (2 vols., 1924- 1932)
- Vom Wesen der deutschen Universitaet (1925)
- Die preussische Kunstpolitik und der Fall Schilling (1925)
- Die Paedagogische Akademie im Aufbau unseres nationalen Bildungswesens (1926)
- Zu Beethovens 100. Todestag (1927)
