= Citadel of Homs =

Historic building in Homs, Syria

- قلعة حمص
- Homs, Syria
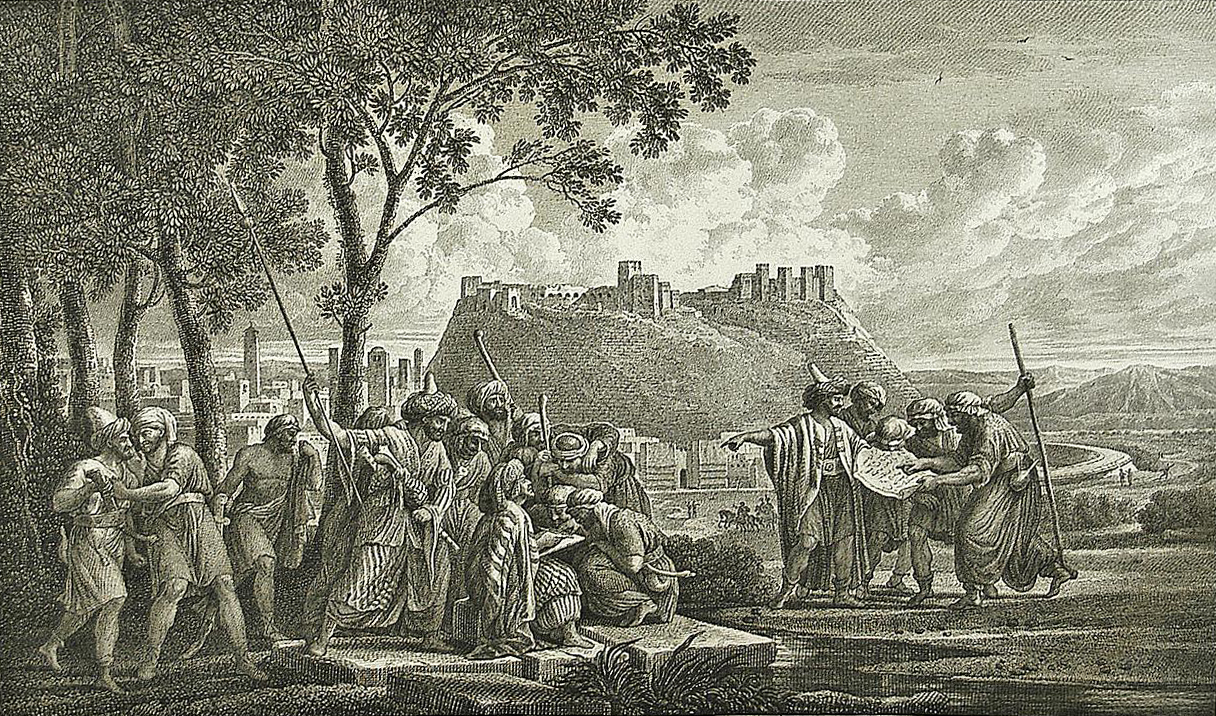
- Château et portion de la ville de Hemss, jadis Émèse, etching after Louis-François Cassas, published 1799

Site information
- Type: Castle
- Condition: Ruined

Location
- Coordinates: 34.723807°N 36.714371°E

The Citadel of Homs, also known as Homs Castle or Qalaat Homs (Arabic: قلعة حمص), is a historic building now mostly ruined in Homs, Syria. The citadel was built on top of an ancient tell southwest of the Old City, with remains dating back to the 3rd millennium BCE. The citadel is locally known as the "Citadel of Usama", named after Usama ibn Munqidh.

== History ==
Julia Domna, daughter of the high-priest Julius Bassianus, has contributed to improve the city of Emesa and its citadel during the Roman Syria era. At that time, the citadel was able to contain accommodation, warehouses and administrative buildings surrounded by semi-circular walls.

However, today the Citadel is in ruinous state as a result of massive demolition started by the Egyptian army of Ibrâhîm Pasha in the 1830s. This was followed by leveling and extensive new construction carried out when the site was used as a military base by the French army during the Mandate period and thereafter by the Syrian army.

The Citadel was only abandoned for military purposes in the late 1980s when it passed to the Directorate-General of Antiquities and Museums.

== See also ==
- List of castles in Syria
