= Tomb of Suleyman Shah =

Tomb of Suleyman Shah Süleyman Şah Türbesi
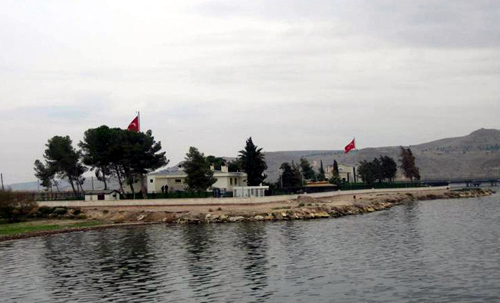
- View of the building complex of the Tomb of Suleyman Shah (its second location, 1973 – February 2015), seen from the Euphrates river

- Location within Syria
- Coordinates: 36°52′45″N 38°6′20″E
- Country: Syria (geographic location); Turkey (governance at local level)
- Governorate: Aleppo Governorate
- Elevation: 475 m (1,558 ft)
- Time zone: UTC+2 (EET)

The Tomb of Suleyman Shah (Arabic: ضريح سليمان شاه; Turkish: Süleyman Şah Türbesi) is, according to Ottoman tradition, the grave (tomb, mausoleum) housing the relics of Suleyman Shah (c. 1178–1236), grandfather of Osman I (d. 1323/4), the founder of the Ottoman Empire. This legendary tomb has since 1236 had three locations, all in present-day Syria.

From 1236 until 1973, its first location was near castle Qal'at Ja'bar in present-day Raqqa Governorate, Syria.

Under the Treaty of Lausanne (1923), breaking up the Ottoman Empire into Turkey, Syria, and other states, the tomb site remains the property of Turkey.

In 1973, when the area around castle Qal'at Ja'bar was due to be flooded under Lake Assad, the tomb by agreement between Turkey and Syria was moved 85 km (53 mi) northward on the Euphrates River in Syria, 27 km (17 mi) from the Turkish border.

In early 2015, during the Syrian civil war, Turkey unilaterally moved the tomb again to a new site in Syria, about 180 m (590 ft) from the Turkish border, 22 km (14 mi) west of Kobanî and just north of the Syrian village of Ashme, evacuating the approximately 40 Turkish soldiers guarding the tomb. The Turkish government has stated that the relocation is temporary, and that it does not constitute any change to the status of the tomb site.

== Death of Suleyman Shah ==
Suleyman Shah (c. 1178–1236) was, according to some but not all Ottoman genealogies, the grandfather of Osman I (d. 1323/4), the founder of the Ottoman Empire. Suleyman Shah is believed to have drowned in the Euphrates river near castle Qal'at Ja'bar in present-day Raqqa Governorate, Syria, and was, according to legend, buried near that castle, in a tomb.

== Legal status of tomb ==
Article 9 of the Treaty of Ankara, signed by France and Turkey in 1921, states that the tomb of Suleyman Shah (at its first location) "shall remain, with its appurtenances, the property of Turkey, who may appoint guardians for it and may hoist the Turkish flag there". Initially, an 11-man symbolic garrison of Turkish soldiers was guarding the tomb.

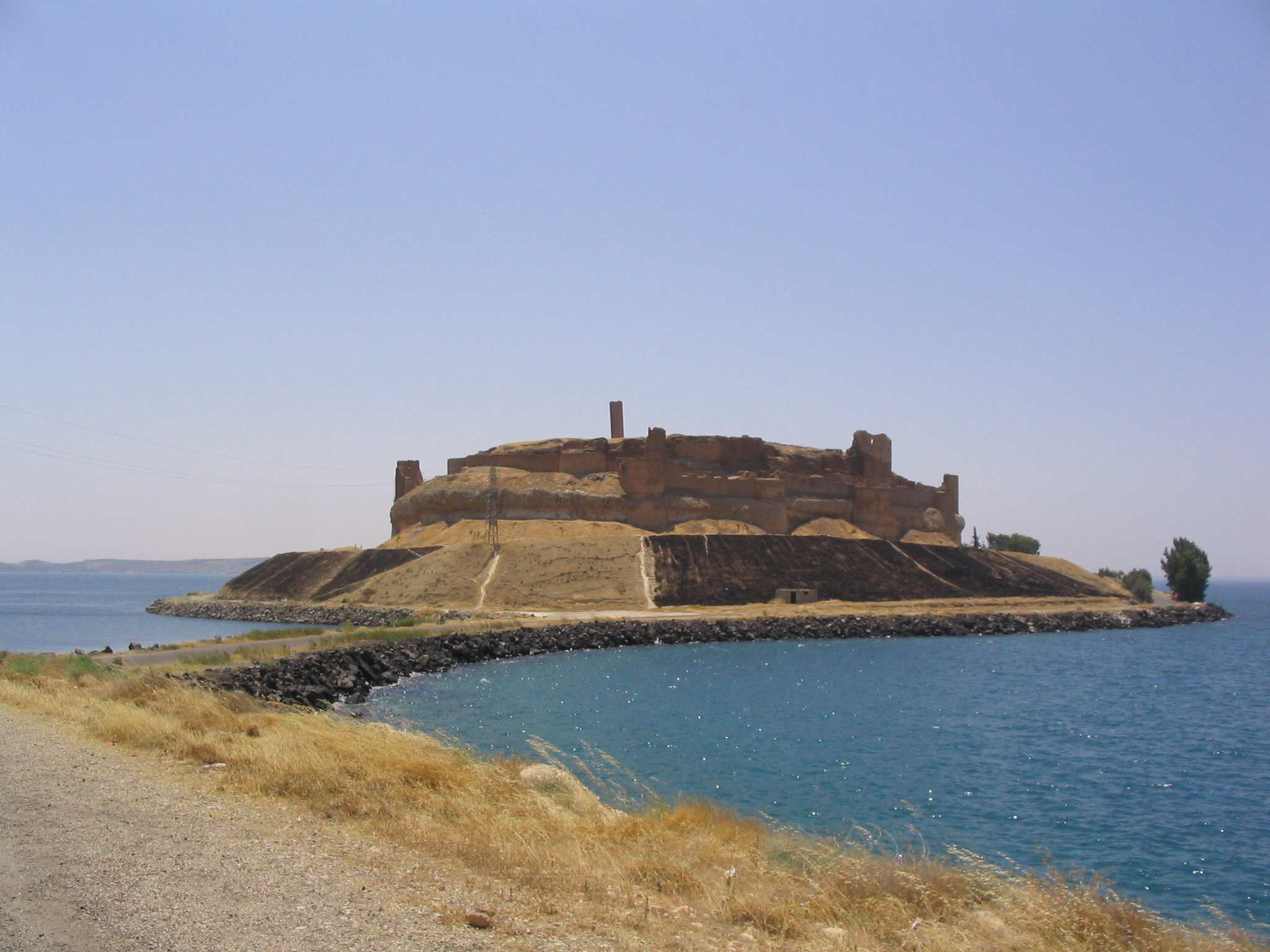
Qal'at Ja'bar castle in Syria, as it is surrounded since 1973 by the waters of Euphrates Lake. Previously, this was a fortified hilltop overlooking the Euphrates valley. According to legend Suleyman Shah in 1236 drowned in the Euphrates near this castle, and was buried near the castle. With the creation of this lake in 1973 the tomb was relocated, 85 km (53 mi) northward on the Euphrates River, 27 km (17 mi) from the Turkish border.

The Protocol of 2003 between the Republic of Türkiye and the Syrian Arab Republic regarding the Tomb of Suleyman Shah (at its second location) gave Turkey transit rights to the Tomb through Syrian territory, in order to maintain and carry out repairs at the Tomb. Since 2014, the official position of Turkey appears to be that the land around the second location (1973 – February 2015) of the tomb is or was the sovereign territory of Turkey. Turkey required visitors to the site to carry passports. However, there is no evidence to date that other countries, including Syria, have publicly supported this position.

The Syrian position is that the first relocation relinquished any Turkish rights over the sovereignty of the site, and the latest relocation of the tomb in February 2015 (to its third location) is a breach of the Treaty of Ankara.

== First relocation ==
In 1973, the area around castle Qal'at Ja'bar, with the location of the tomb, was due to be flooded when the Tabqa Dam would create Lake Assad.

The tomb by agreement between Turkey and Syria then was moved to a new location at 36°38′22″N 38°12′27″E some 85 km (53 mi) northward but also on the Euphrates riverside and also in Syria, 10 km (6.2 mi) northwest of the town of Sarrin, in Aleppo Governorate, and some 27 km (17 mi) from the Turkish border.

Until February 2015, Turkey maintained at this site a small military presence as an honor guard.

== Events during the Syrian civil war ==
On 5 August 2012, during the Syrian civil war, the Turkish prime minister Recep Tayyip Erdoğan stated that "The tomb of Suleyman Shah [in Syria] and the land surrounding it is our territory. We cannot ignore any unfavorable act against that monument, as it would be an attack on our territory, as well as an attack on NATO land... Everyone knows his duty, and will continue to do what is necessary".

=== ISIL threats ===
On 20 March 2014, the Islamic State of Iraq and the Levant (ISIL) threatened to attack Turkey's territory tomb site unless the Turkish troops guarding it were withdrawn within three days. The Turkish government reacted by saying it would retaliate against any such attack, and did not withdraw its guards. However, the threatened attack did not take place. Due to (such) tensions, the garrison at the tomb was increased to 38 men, in 2014 or earlier.

On 27 March 2014, recordings were released on YouTube of a conversation, probably recorded at then Turkish Foreign Minister Ahmet Davutoğlu's office on 13 March, purportedly involving Ahmet Davutoğlu, Foreign Ministry Undersecretary Feridun Sinirlioğlu, the then National Intelligence Organization (MİT) head Hakan Fidan, and the Deputy Chief of the General Staff General Yaşar Güler, discussing possible Turkish intervention or incursion into Syria ahead of the Turkish local elections of 30 March.

Between June and September 2014, while ISIL held 49 Turkish consulate personnel in Mosul hostage (see Fall of Mosul#Aftermath), there was a rumor that Turkey had agreed to disengage from the Süleyman Shah Tomb in exchange for the hostages’ release.

On 30 September 2014, Turkish Deputy Prime Minister Bülent Arınç said that ISIL militants were advancing on the Suleyman Shah tomb. An earlier report of pro-government newspaper Yeni Şafak, citing anonymous sources, had mentioned 1,100 ISIL militants surrounding the tomb. On 1 October, however, President Erdoğan denied that ISIL had encircled the tomb.

On 2 October 2014, Turkish Parliament authorized the use of the Turkish military force against ISIL. One argument mentioned in the parliamentary debate was the increasing security risks to the Süleyman Shah Tomb.

=== Second relocation (2015) ===
In early 2015, according to Al Jazeera, the tomb was surrounded by ISIL. The BBC, however, stated, that after having driven ISIL out of Kobanî in January 2015, the Kurdish People's Protection Units (YPG) and Syrian rebels took control of several villages surrounding the tomb.

Different locations of Süleyman's tomb

==== "Operation Shah Euphrates" ====
In the night of 21–22 February 2015, a convoy of 572 Turkish troops in 39 tanks and 57 armoured vehicles entered Syria through Kobanî to evacuate the 38-man Turkish military garrison guarding the Suleyman Shah tomb and move the remains of Suleyman Shah to a different site. Those remains were moved to a site in Syria closer to the border in an area under Turkish military control, after which the rest of the old mausoleum was demolished. One soldier died in the overnight raid.

ISIL did not impede this Turkish operation. A local Syrian Kurdish official said the Kurds had allowed the Turkish forces to cross their territory, but Turkish Prime Minister Davutoglu denied such cooperation. Syrian Kurdish leader Salih Muslim revealed the close collaboration of Syrian Kurds and Turkish forces for this operation, with positive top level planning in Ankara (Turkey) and operation monitoring. The operation went smoothly, and Syrian Kurds coordinators left Ankara. After this Turkish evacuation, entitled "Operation Shah Euphrates", Al Jazeera assumed the area to be "most probably" under full ISIL control.

==== New location ====
Since then, the tomb has been located in Turkish-controlled territory 180 m (590 ft) inside Syria, just north of the Syrian village of Ashme and less than 2 km (1.2 mi) southeast of the Turkish village of Esmesi (Esmeler or Esme or Eshme) in the southernmost Turkish Birecik District of Şanliurfa, 5 km (3.1 mi) east of the Euphrates, 10 km (6.2 mi) northeast of the Syrian town of Jarabulus and 22 km (14 mi) west of Kobanî.

The Turkish Foreign Minister has stated that the relocation is only a temporary measure and that it does not constitute any change to the status of the tomb. The Syrian Assad regime said the raid was an act of "flagrant aggression" and that it would hold Ankara responsible for its repercussions.

==== Return ====
On 2 April 2018, Turkey's Deputy Prime Minister Fikri Işık said the tomb would be relocated to its original location in northern Syria.
