= Dorota Malarczyk =

Polish numismatist and Islamic scholar

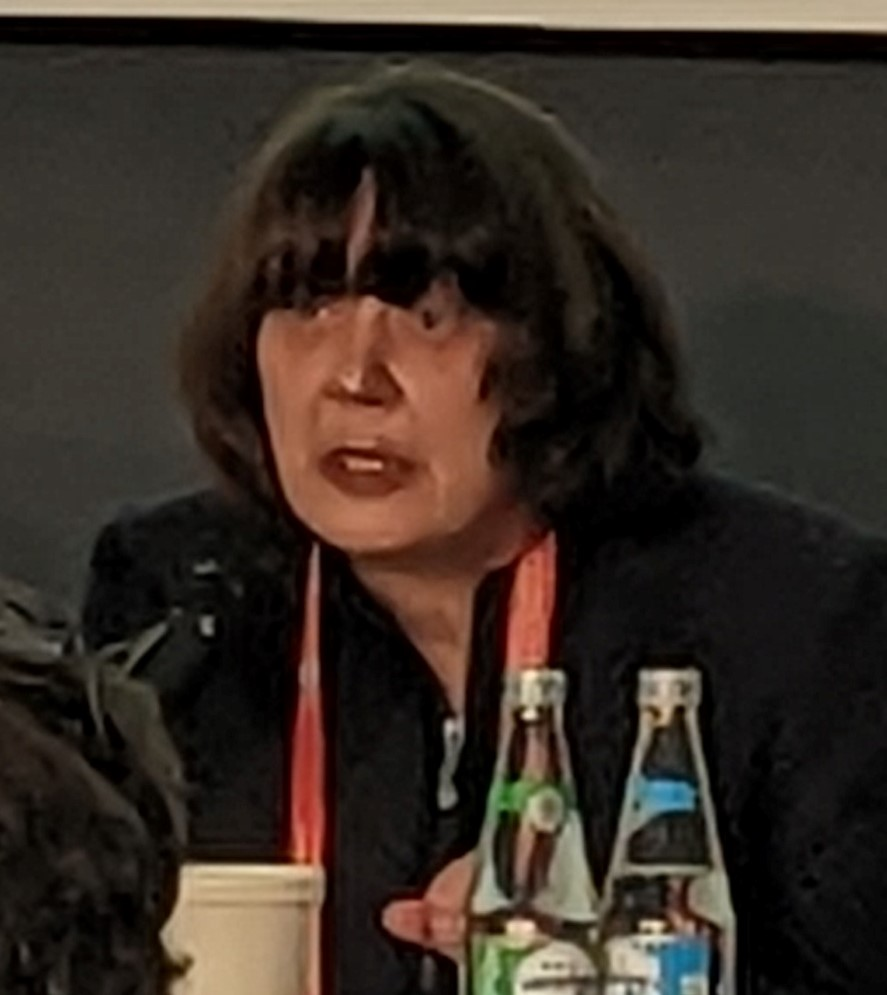
- Dorota Malarczyk in 2022
- Born: 1966 (age 59–60)
- Occupation: Curator
- Awards: Samir Shamma Prize (2020)

Academic work
- Discipline: Numismatics
- Sub-discipline: Islamic Numismatics
- Institutions: Czapski Museum, National Museum in Kraków

Dorota Malarczyk is a Polish numismatist and Islamicist, who is a curator of the Emeryk Hutten-Czapski Museum, which is the coin cabinet of the National Museum, Krakow. In 2020 the Royal Numismatic Society awarded her the Samir Shamma Prize for Islamic Numismatics. She was a member of the Organising Committee for the 16th International Numismatic Congress in Warsaw. Research projects have included: Umayyad coins from Marea, inscriptions from the Kom el-Dikka graveyard in Alexandria, gems engraved with Arabic inscriptions and silver currency in tenth-century Europe.

== Selected publications ==
- Wadyl, Sławomir, Kacper Martyka, and Dorota Malarczyk. "Early Abbasid dirhams from a newly discovered stronghold in Bornity near Pieniężno." Wiadomości Numizmatyczne (2018).
- Bogucki, Mateusz, et al. Frühmittelalterliche Münzfunde aus Polen: Inventar. Ermland und Masuren: Funde aus Polen 2011-2013: addenda et corrigenda. Institut für Archäologie und Ethnologie der Polnischen Akademie der Wissenschaften, 2016.
- Malarczyk, Dorota, and Roksana Wawrzczak. "Skarb z XI wieku z Grzymisławia, powiat człuchowski." Wiadomości Numizmatyczne (2016).
- Malarczyk, Dorota. "Orenice, gm. Piątek, pow. Łęczyca." Wiadomości Numizmatyczne 51.1 (2007): 183.
- Bogucki, Mateusz, Dorota Malarczyk, and Ewa Marczak. "The 10th century dirham hoard from the stronghold at Truszki Zalesie, Kolno poviat, Podlaskie Voivodeship." Wiadomości Numizmatyczne (2005).
- Bartczak, Andrzej, and Dorota Malarczyk. "Dirhams of some early medieval finds from the area of Great Poland." Wiadomości Numizmatyczne (2000).
