= Journal of Qur'anic Studies =

Academic journal on religion

- Discipline: Religious studies
- Language: English, Arabic

Publication details
- History: 1999-present
- Publisher: Edinburgh University Press on behalf of the Centre for Islamic Studies at the School of Oriental and African Studies.
- Frequency: Biannually

Standard abbreviations
- ISO 4: J. Qur'anic Stud.

Indexing
- ISSN: 1465-3591 (print); 1755-1730 (web)
- OCLC no.: 43733991

Links
- Journal homepage; Online access

The Journal of Qur'anic Studies is a peer-reviewed academic journal that covers the field of Quranic studies from a wide range of scholarly perspectives, reflecting a diversity of approaches.

== Language ==
The journal publishes articles both in English and Arabic to encourage the bridging of the gap between the two traditions of Muslim and Western scholarship.

== Publishing ==
The journal principally publishes original papers, along with a book review section including reviews of new works on the Qur'an.

== See also ==
- Der Islam
- Journal of the International Quranic Studies Association
