= Qal'at Ja'bar =

Castle in Raqqa Governorate, Syria

- قلعة جعبر; Qal'at Dawsar (ancient name)
- Raqqa Governorate, Syria
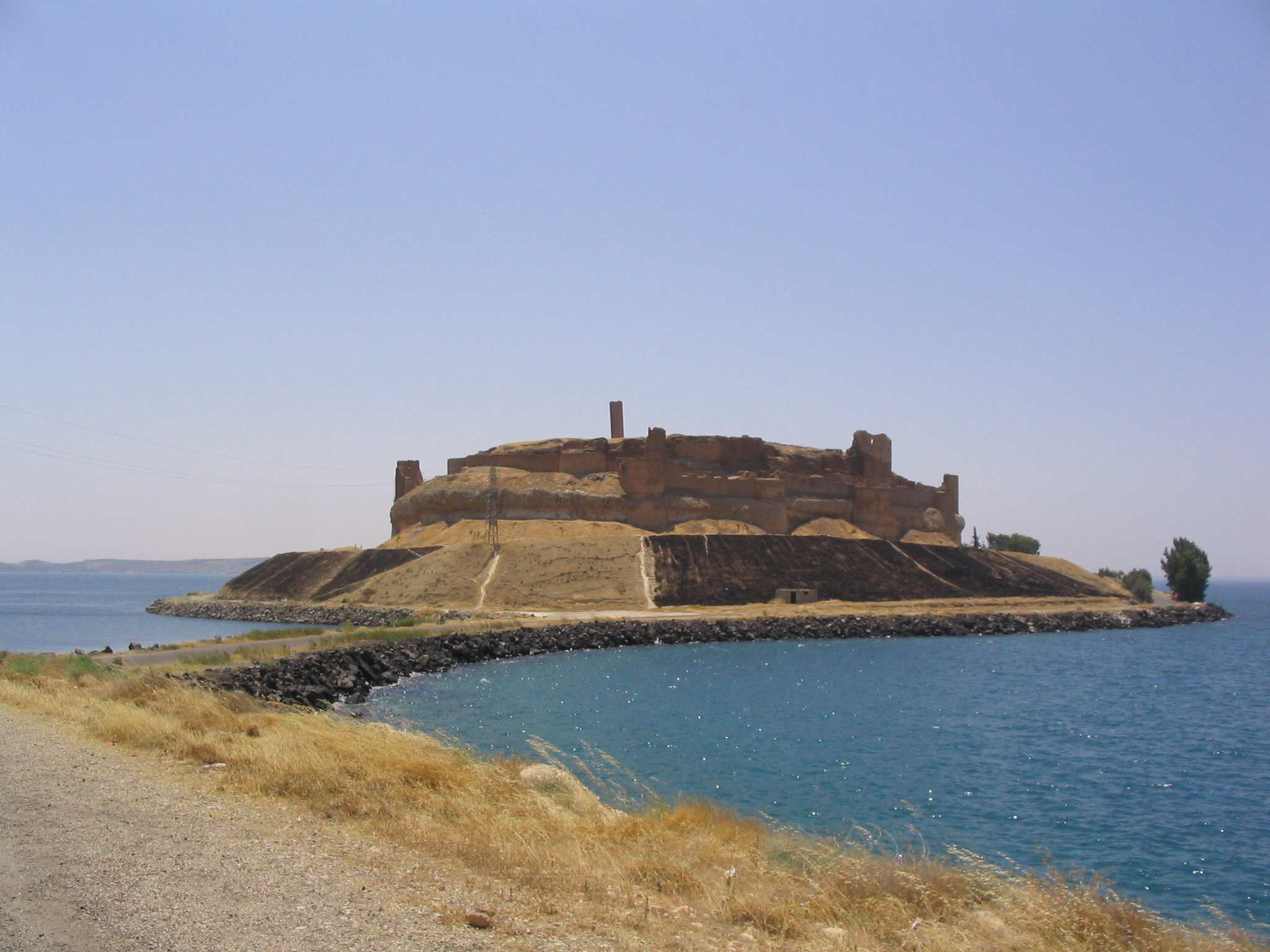
- Qal'at Ja'bar from the north, surrounded by the waters of Euphrates Lake

Site information
- Type: Castle
- Open to the public: Yes
- Condition: Partially restored ruin

Location
- Location of Qal'at Ja'bar
- Location within Syria
- Coordinates: 35.8975°N 38.480833°E

Site history
- Built: 1168
- Built by: Nur ad-Din Zangi
- Materials: Stone and brick

Qal'at Ja'bar (Arabic: قلعة جعبر, romanized: Qalʿat Jaʿbar) is a castle on the left bank of Euphrates Lake in Raqqa Governorate, Syria. Its site, formerly a prominent hill-top overlooking the Euphrates Valley, is now an island in the Euphrates Lake that can only be reached by an artificial causeway. Although the hilltop on which the castle sits was possibly already fortified in the 7th century, the current structures are primarily the work of Nur ad-Din, who rebuilt the castle from 1168 onwards. Since 1965, several excavations have been carried out in and around the castle, as well as restoration works of the walls and towers. The castle was a Turkish exclave between 1921 and 1973.

== History ==
=== Before the castle ===
It is not exactly known when the hilltop of Qal'at Ja'bar was first fortified. The site was already known as "Dawsar" in pre-Islamic times and was located along a route connecting Raqqa with the west.

=== 11th century and later ===
Qal'at Dawsar was mentioned in 1040/41 when the Fatimid governor of Syria Anushtakin al-Dizbari was on a campaign in the area. At an unspecified point afterward it came into the possession of a certain Ja'bar ibn Sabiq, a member of the tribe of Banu Numayr or Banu Qushayr. He was killed there in 1071/72. It developed a reputation for being a haven for Bedouin highwaymen from the two tribes. In 1086 it was conquered by the Seljuks under Malik-Shah I, who granted it to the Uqaylid commander of the Citadel of Aleppo, Salim ibn Malik ibn Badran, as compensation for his surrender of Aleppo. The castle may have been built by the Numayr, but more likely its construction occurred under Salim.

Salim's descendants held the castle almost continuously until the late 12th century, except for a brief occupation by Crusaders in 1102. In 1146, Zengi besieged the castle, but he was murdered there by one of his own slaves. In 1168, Qal'at Ja'bar passed into the hands of Zengi's son Nur ad-Din, who undertook major construction works at the castle. Most of what can be seen today dates to this period. The castle was heavily damaged during the Mongol invasions of Syria. Restoration works were carried out in the 14th century.

=== Tomb of Suleyman Shah ===
Suleyman Shah, the grandfather of Osman I (progenitor of the Ottoman Empire), reputedly drowned in the Euphrates near Qal'at Ja'bar, and was buried near the castle. However, it is probable that this story resulted from a confusion between Suleyman Shah, and Sulayman bin Kutalmish, the founder of the Seljuk Sultanate of Rûm. It is however not certain whether the actual tomb, known as Mezār-i Türk, related to either of these two rulers. The Ottoman sultan Hamid II had the tomb reconstructed. By article 9 of the Treaty of Ankara of 1921, the area was accepted as Turkish territory and Turkish soldiers were allowed to guard the tomb after Syria's establishment as a French mandate and eventual independence. In 1973, in response to the rising water level of the newly created Lake Assad, the reputed tomb of Suleyman Shah and the associated exclave were moved to a new location north of Qal'at Ja'bar and the castle itself became Syrian territory.

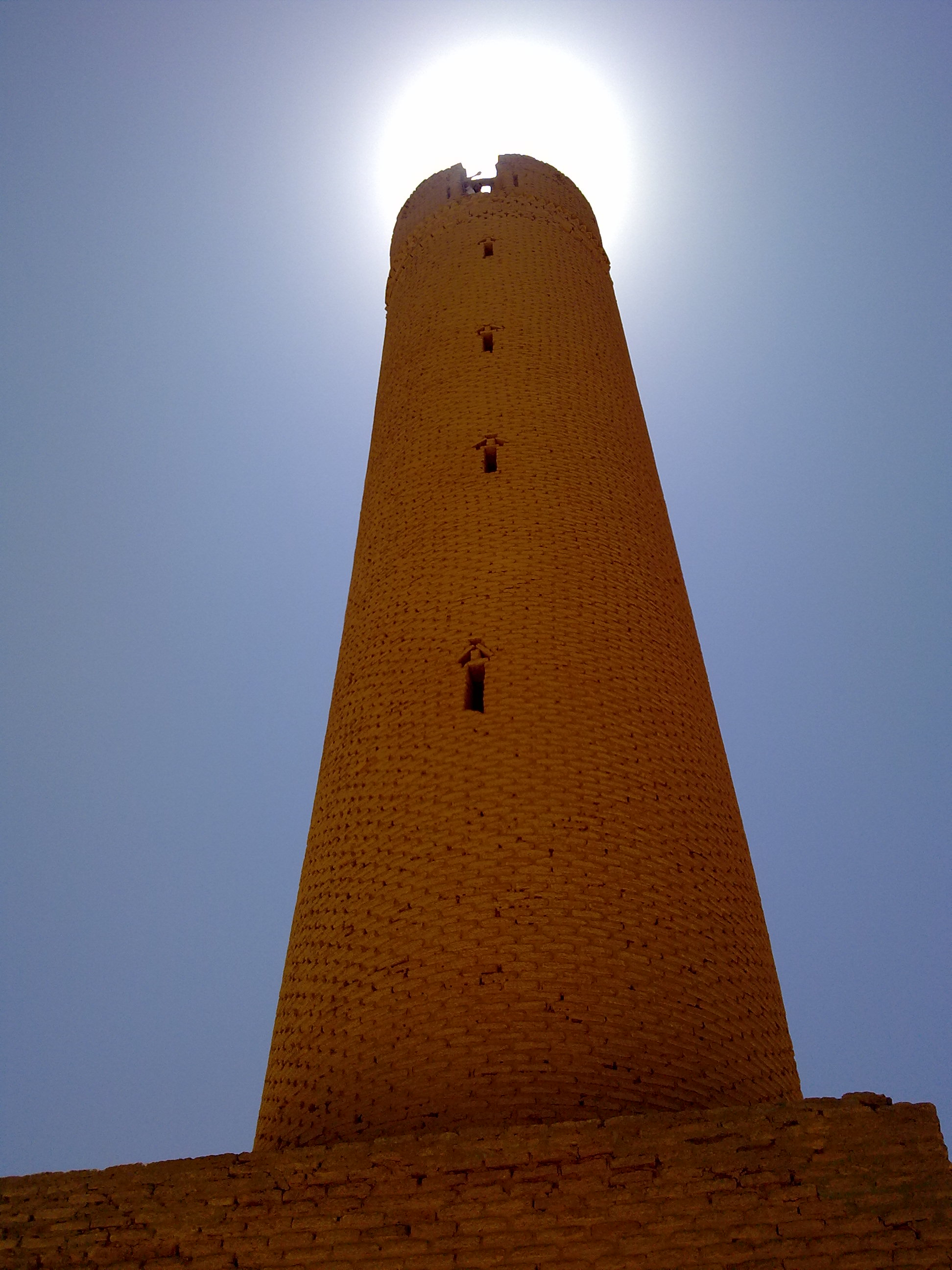
The castle's minaret

=== Syrian civil war ===
During the Syrian Civil War, Islamic State of Iraq and the Levant captured the castle in its 2014 offensive in Syria. The castle grounds were suspected to have been subsequently repurposed by ISIL as a training ground, with tunnels and weapons depots built into the site. Syrian Democratic Forces captured the site on 6 January 2017 as part of its Raqqa offensive, seizing it after killing 22 ISIL fighters. ISIL had built tunnels and weapons depots into the castle grounds.

== Architecture ==
Qal'at Ja'bar measures 370 by 170 metres (1,210 ft × 560 ft). The castle consists of a stone-built wall with 35 bastions around a rock core, and is partially surrounded by a dry moat. The layout of the castle is very reminiscent of the much better preserved citadel of Aleppo. The upper parts of the castle are built from baked bricks. The entrance to the inner parts of the castle consists of a gatehouse and a winding ramp cut out of the rock. Inside the castle are the remains of a vaulted hall, as well as minaret that was probably built by Nur ad-Din, and that is the highest part of the castle. The brickwork that is currently visible is mainly the result of extensive restoration works by the Syrian Directorate-General of Antiquities and Museums (DGAM).

== Restoration and excavation ==
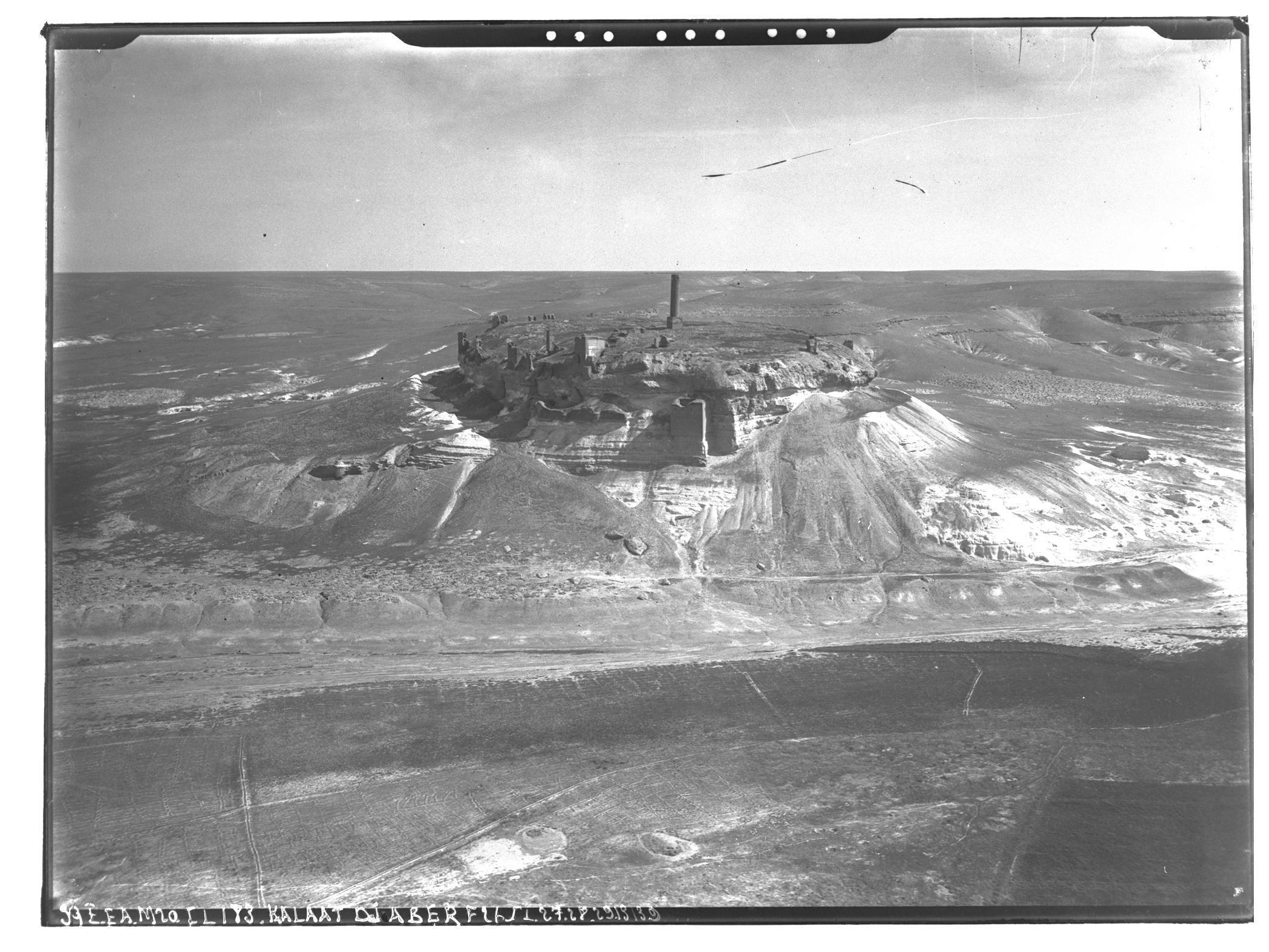
View of the castle in 1939, before construction of the Tabqa Dam and flooding of the surrounding land.

In 1968, construction of the Tabqa Dam commenced, as a result of which the area upstream would eventually be flooded by the dam's reservoir. In anticipation of the filling of the reservoir, excavations and restoration works were carried out at numerous sites in the region, including Qal'at Ja'bar. Although the location of Qal'at Ja'bar on a prominent hilltop ensured that it would not be flooded, the eventual lake level would turn the castle into an island. It was therefore surrounded by a protective glacis, and it was connected to the mainland by a causeway. These works were carried out between 1965 and 1974 by the Architectural Service of the DGAM, the Directorate General of the Dam and UNESCO at a cost of LS 4 million . The restoration focused primarily on the eastern walls and towers. In addition, parts of the western ramparts were restored, as well as the donjon Alia, which was intended to house a museum for the finds of the excavations at the castle. To facilitate the restoration, a small brickworks was established at the castle. Finds from the castle are now on display in the National Museum of Aleppo and Raqqa Museum.

== See also ==
- List of islands of Syria
- List of castles in Syria
