= Arabica (journal) =

- Discipline: Arab studies
- Language: English, French
- Edited by: Jean-Charles Coulon

Publication details
- History: 1954–present
- Publisher: Brill Publishers

Standard abbreviations
- ISO 4: Arabica

Indexing
- ISSN: 0570-5398 (print); 1570-0585 (web)

Links
- Journal homepage

Arabica is a peer-review academic journals of Arab studies founded in 1954 by Evariste Lévi-Provençal. The journal has been published by Brill Publishers since 1980. It is currently edited by Jean-Charles Coulon, and was in the past edited by Mohammed Arkoun.

== Abstracting and indexing ==
The journal is abstracted and indexed in the following bibliographic databases:

- Academic Search Premier
- Arab World Research Source
- Arts and Humanities Citation Index
- ATLA Religion Database
- IBZ Online
- Index Islamicus
- International Bibliography of the Social Sciences
- Linguistic Bibliography
- Linguistics & Language Behavior Abstracts
- Modern Language Association Database
- Periodicals Index Online
- Religion and Philosophy Collection
- Scopus

According to Scopus, it has a 2020 CiteScore of 0.7, ranking 60th out of 845 journals in the category "Literature and Literary Theory".
