= Der Islam =

- Discipline: Middle Eastern studies
- Language: English, French, German
- Edited by: Stefan Heidemann

Publication details
- History: 1910–present
- Publisher: Walter de Gruyter
- Frequency: Biannually
- Impact factor: 0.3 (2022)

Standard abbreviations
- ISO 4: Islam

Indexing
- ISSN: 0021-1818 (print); 1613-0928 (web)
- LCCN: 2011233842
- OCLC no.: 645364454

Links
- Journal homepage; Online access; Online archive

Der Islam: Journal of the History and Culture of the Middle East is a biannual peer-reviewed academic journal covering research on the history and culture of the Middle East, such as Quranic studies. The journal is published by Walter de Gruyter. It was established in 1910 by Carl Heinrich Becker and continued by Hellmut Ritter and Bertold Spuler, amongst others. The current editor-in-chief is Stefan Heidemann (University of Hamburg). The journal publishes articles in English, French, and German.

== Abstracting and indexing ==
The journal is abstracted and indexed in:

- Arts & Humanities Citation Index
- ATLA Religion Database
- Current Contents/Arts & Humanities
- EBSCO databases
- Index Islamicus
- International Bibliography of Periodical Literature
- Linguistic Bibliography
- Modern Language Association Database
- ProQuest databases
- Répertoire International de Littérature Musicale
- Scopus

According to the Journal Citation Reports, the journal has a 2022 impact factor of 0.3.

== See also ==
- Journal of Qur'anic Studies
- Journal of the International Quranic Studies Association
