= Stefan Heidemann =

German orientalist

Stefan Heidemann (born 1961 in Versmold in Westphalia) is a German orientalist at Hamburg University, Hamburg.

== Biography ==
Islamic studies including Islamic Art and economics in Regensburg, Berlin, Damascus and Cairo 1982–1993; Ph.D. in Islamic studies 1993 at Free University Berlin; Graduate seminar of the American Numismatic Society New York, 1993; Wissenschaftlicher Assistent (assistant professor) 1994–2001 at Jena University; Habilitation 2001 at Jena University; visiting Professor 2001–2003 at University of Leipzig; Oberassistent (senior assistant professor) 2002–2004 at Jena University; 2007-2008 Fellowship of the Aga Khan-Program of Islamic Architecture at MIT, Cambridge, Massachusetts; 2008 Fellowship at the Fitzwilliam Museum, Cambridge, UK; 2004–2010 Hochschuldozent (C2 professorship) at Jena University. During his time at Jena University he co-ordinated the 'Oriental Coin Cabinet' and the 'Alphons-Stübel Collection of Middle Eastern Photographs (1850–1890)'.

2009–2011 he taught as Professor of Islamic History and Artistic and Material Culture at the Bard Graduate Center in New York City and between 2010 and 2011 he served as Associate Curator of Islamic Art at The Metropolitan Museum of Art. Since 2011 he teaches as Full Professor of Islamic studies at Hamburg University and serves since 2012 as editor-in-chief of the journal Der Islam. He coordinates the 'Webinar Initiative in Islamic Material Culture.

== Main areas of research ==
His studies focus on political and economic history, material culture and numismatics of the Islamic World from Mongolia to northern Africa in the pre-modern period. Historical studies focus in their majority on Syria and northern Mesopotamia from the 7th to the 16th century. Earlier studies include contemporary economic and development policies.

Co-operation with several archaeological missions especially in Syria among them at the citadels in Aleppo, Damascus and Masyaf, urban sites such as Raqqa, and Kharab Sayyar, but also in Portugal, Mongolia, and Afghanistan Balkh.

In particular he pursues four major research projects:

- The Early Islamic Empire at Work – the View from the Region Toward the center (7th to 11th century).
- The Middle Islamic Period (12th century C.E.): Social, Economic and Cultural Transformations in Syria and Northern Mesopotamia including material culture.
- Raqqa at the Euphrates: Urbanity, Economy and Settlement Pattern in the Early Islamic Period.
- History of Scholarship in Islamic Studies.

== Awards and honors ==
- 2005 Samir-Shamma-Prize of the Royal Numismatic Society, London.
- 2015 Full member of the Academy of Science and Literature in Mainz.

== Publications ==
Publications on development policy, medieval Islamic history, history of Middle Eastern studies, Islamic numismatics, material culture, and archaeology.

- Das Aleppiner Kalifat (A.D. 1261). Vom Untergang des Kalifates in Bagdad über Aleppo zu den Restaurationen in Kairo (Islamic History and Civilization. Studies and Texts 6), Leiden 1994.
- Islamische Numismatik in Deutschland (Jenaer Beiträge zum Vorderen Orient 2), Wiesbaden 2000. (as editor and major contributor)
- Die Renaissance der Städte. Städtische Entwicklung und wirtschaftliche Bedingungen in Raqqa und Harran von der Zeit der beduinischen Vorherrschaft bis zu den Seldschuken (Islamic History and Civilization. Studies and Texts 40), Leiden 2002.
- with Andrea Becker, Raqqa II – Die islamische Stadt, Mainz 2003.(as editor and major contributor)
- with Kevin Butcher, Regional History and Coin Finds from Assur / From the Achaemenids to the Nineteenth Century (Wissenschaftliche Veröffentlichungen der Deutschen Orient-Gesellschaft 148; Ausgrabungen der Deutschen Orient-Gesellschaft in Assur F: Fundgruppen 8), Wiesbaden 2017.

== Sources ==
- Kürschners Deutscher Gelehrten-Kalender 2012. De Gruyter: Berlin (24th ed.) 2011.
- Concise biographical companion to Index Islamicus : an international who's who in Islamic studies from its beginnings down to the twentieth century; bio-bibliographical supplement to Index Islamicus, 1665–1980 (Handbook of oriental studies = Handbuch der Orientalistik, Sect. 1: The Near and Middle East, vol. 76), ed. by Wolfgang Behn, Leiden (Brill) 2006.
