= Canonization of Islamic scripture =

Canonized Islamic scripture are texts which Muslims believe were revealed by God through various prophets throughout humanity's history—specifically the Quran and Hadith. Muslims believe the Quran to be the final revelation of God to mankind, and a completion and confirmation of previous scriptures, revealed to Muhammad between 610 and 632 CE, and canonized around 650 by the Rashidun leader Uthman. Different readings of the Quran (Ahruf), criticized and dismissed as human works by various groups early, were sanctified and legitimized a few centuries later, accompanied by narratives pointing to the divine source of these readings. Shia had more than 1,000 hadiths ascribed to the Shia Imams which indicate the distortion of the Quran and according to Etan Kohlberg, this belief about Quran was common among Shiites in the early centuries of Islam. Alleged distortions have been carried out to remove any references to the rights of Ali, the Imams and their supporters and the disapproval of enemies, such as Umayyads and Abbasids. (Note: Ibn Babawayh was the first major Twelver author "to adopt a position identical to that of the Sunnis" and the change was a result of the "rise to power of the Sunni 'Abbasid caliphate," whence belief in the corruption of the Quran became untenable vis-a-vis the position of Sunni "orthodoxy".)

Hadith (the record of the words, actions, and the silent approval of Muhammad) are also considered by many to be divine revelation, directing Muslims on a broader number of rules than the Quran, including the rules of Sharia (Islamic law). The major compilations, especially that of the Six Books, primarily took place in the ninth century, with their canonization occurring later. The two most important compilations, (the Sahihayn), are Sahih al-Bukhari and Sahih Muslim. These were canonized by Shafi'i's in the 10th century CE, by the Malikis and Hanbali school of fiqh in the 12th CE century, and by Hanafi's in the 14th century. Different collections of hadith would come to differentiate the different branches of the Islamic faith.

== Traditional story on canonization of Islamic scripture ==
=== Quran ===
==== Uthmanic canonization ====
Prior to the death of Muhammad, many Muslims had the Quran completely memorized, so there was no need or urgency to put the manuscripts together to form an official copy. The Quran was canonized only after Muhammad's death in 632 CE. According to Islamic tradition the third caliph, Uthman ibn Affan (r. 23/644–35 AH/655 CE) established the canonical Qur'an, reportedly starting the process in 644 CE, and completing the work around 650 CE (the exact date was not recorded by early Arab annalists). It is generally accepted that the Uthmanic text comprises all 114 surahs (chapters of the Quran) in the order known today.

The Qur'anic canon is the form of the Quran as recited and written in which it is religiously binding for the Muslim community. This canonical corpus is closed and fixed in the sense that nothing in the Quran can be changed or modified.

According to the traditional Islamic narrative, by the time of Uthman's caliphate, there was a perceived need for clarification of Qur'an reading. The holy book had often been spread to others orally by Muslims who had memorized the Quran in its entirety (huffaz), but now "sharp divergence" had appeared in recitation of the book among Muslims. It is believed the general Hudhayfah ibn al-Yaman reported this problem to the caliph and asked him to establish a unified text. According to the history of al-Tabari, during the expedition to conquer Armenia and Azerbaijan there were 10,000 Kufan Muslim warriors, 6,000 in Azerbaijan and 4,000 at Rayy, and a large number of these soldiers disagreed about the correct way of reciting the Quran.

What was more, many of the huffaz were dying. 70 had been killed in the Battle of Yamama. The Islamic empire had also grown considerably, expanding into Iraq, Syria, Egypt, and Iran, bringing into Islam's fold many new converts from various cultures with varying degrees of isolation. These converts spoke a variety of languages but were not well learned in Arabic, and so Uthman felt it was important to standardize the written text of the Quran on one specific Arabic dialect.

Uthman obtained written "sheets" or parts of the Quran from Ḥafṣa, one of the widows of Muhammad. Other parts collected from Companions had been "written down on parchment, stone, palm leaves and the shoulder blades of camels". He appointed a commission consisting of a scribe of Muhammad, Zayd ibn Thabit and three prominent Meccans, and instructed them to copy the sheets into several volumes based on the dialect of the Quraysh — the tribe of Muhammad and the main tribe of Mecca.

Uthman's reaction in 653 is recorded in the following hadith from Sahih al-Bukhari, 6:61:510:

"So Uthman sent a message to Hafsa saying, "Send us the manuscripts of the Quran so that we may compile the Quranic materials in perfect copies and return the manuscripts to you." Hafsa sent it to Uthman. Uthman then ordered Zaid bin Thabit, Abdullah bin Az Zubair, Said bin Al-As and Abdur Rahman bin Harith bin Hisham to rewrite the manuscripts in perfect copies. Uthman said to the three Quraishi men, "In case you disagree with Zaid bin Thabit on any point in the Quran, then write it in the dialect of Quraish, the Quran was revealed in their tongue." They did so, and when they had written many copies, 'Uthman returned the original manuscripts to Hafsa. 'Uthman sent to every Muslim province one copy of what they had copied and ordered that all the other Quranic materials, whether written in fragmentary manuscripts or whole copies, be burnt. Zayd bin Thabit added, "A Verse from Surat Ahzab was missed by me when we copied the Quran and I used to hear Allah's Apostle reciting it. So we searched for it and found it with Khuzaima bin Thabit Al-Ansari. [That verse was]: 'Among the Believers are men who have been true in their covenant with Allah.'"

When the task was finished Uthman kept one copy in Medina and sent others to Kufa, Baṣra, Damascus, and, according to some accounts, Mecca, and ordered that all other variant copies of the Quran be destroyed. Some non-Uthmanic Qurans are thought to have survived in Kufa, where Abdullah ibn Masud and his followers reportedly refused.

This is one of the most contested issues and an area where many non-Muslim and Muslim scholars often clash.

==== The seven aḥruf ====
According to Islamic tradition the Quran was revealed to Muhammad in seven ahruf (translated variously as "styles", "forms", or "modes", singular harf). However, Uthman canonized only one of the harf (according to tradition). According to Islamic tradition, the other ahruf were destroyed because after Muhammad's death a rivalry began to develop among some of the Arab tribes over the alleged superiority of their ahruf. In addition, some new converts to Islam began mixing the various forms of recitation out of ignorance. Consequently, as part of the canonization of the Quran, caliph Uthman ordered the rest of the ahruf to be destroyed.

The issue of ahruf (lit means letters), whose origin and legality are disputed, is considered problematic to discuss today within the orthodoxy of the Quran's divine origin and preservation. According to some accounts, when Uthman created his official codex, ordered the collection and destruction of other codices collected from different regions -and so expected to be having native different dialects-; other accounts suggest that the writing process was based on the Quraysh dialect, and according to scholars who assumed the 'Ahruf' were dialects in themselves, these dialects were abolished through the work of Uthman's committee. According to some researchers like John Wansbroughand Yehuda D. Nevo, later known as the Revisionist school of Islamic studies, the canonization of the Quran, through the unification of "various previous texts" into a single, unchanging standard text and the elimination of others, took place over a period of approximately 200 years. They argued that a common method within Islamic tradition was to legitimize a practice by attributing it to a past authority that enjoyed high popular acceptance. This suggests that the accounts of Uthman's cancellation and burning of the codices may actually refer to a single issue encompassing different codices. While variant readings were initially scorned and criticized as human creations, five centuries later these readings were sanctified by being linked to a divine source.

Today, the terminology that delves deeply into the various readings the Quran, encompassing diverse narrations and schools, is Qira'at, and it is said to be distinct from "ahruf”, that also go back to Muhammad according to the Hadith.

This does not mean that only one "reading" of the Quran is canonized. The single harf canonized by Uthman did not include vowels or diacritical marks for some consonants, which allowed for variant readings. Seven readings—known as Qira'at—were noted by scholar Abu Bakr Ibn Mujāhid and canonized in the 8th century CE. Later scholars, such as Ibn al-Jazari, added three other reciters (Abu Ja’far from Madinah, Ya’qub from Basrah, and Khalaf from Kufa) to form the canonical list of ten Qira'at.

Of the ten, the one qira'at has become so popular that (according to one source) "for all practical purposes", it is the one Quranic version in "general use" in the Muslim world today (Note: Some other versions with minor divergences, namely those of Warsh (d.197/812) ....circulate in the northwestern regions of African.) -- Hafs ‘an ‘Asim, specifically the standard Egyptian edition of the Qur’an first published on July 10, 1924 in Cairo. Mass-produced printing press mus'haf (written copies of the Quran) have been credited with narrowing the diversity of qira'at.

==== Shia belief ====
Ali, the fourth Rashidun caliph (r. 656–661) and the first Shia Imam, is widely believed to have compiled his own transcript of the Quran. In particular, there are reports that Ali and some other companions of Muhammad collected the verses of the Quran during the lifetime of the prophet, while other reports emphasize that Ali prepared his codex immediately after the death of Muhammad in 632 CE. This latter group of reports may have been fabricated to imply consensus about the caliphate of Abu Bakr, that is, the preoccupation of Ali with his codex in these reports is intended to justify his widely rumored absence in the Saqifa meeting where Abu Bakr was elected caliph after Muhammad died.

In his codex, Ali may have arranged the verses in the order by which they were revealed to Muhammad, though this claim has been challenged. The codex of Ali may have also included additional information on the abrogated verses of the Quran. By some Shia accounts, Ali offered his codex for official use after the death of Muhammad but was turned down by some of the companions. Alternatively, Ali may have offered his codex for official use to Uthman during his caliphate but the caliph rejected it in favor of other variants available to him. As for its fate, it is believed in Twelver Shia that the codex of Ali has been handed down from every Imam to his successor, as part of the esoteric knowledge available to the Twelve Imams. In Twelver belief, the codex is now in the possession of their last Imam, Muhammad al-Mahdi, who is hidden from the public by divine will since 874, until his reappearance at the end of time to eradicate injustice and evil.

===== Differences with the Uthmanid codex =====
Some Sunni reports allege that the official Uthmanid codex of the Quran is incomplete, as detailed in Fada'il al-Qur'an by the Sunni exegete Abu Ubaid al-Qasim bin Salam (d. 838), among others. Supporting Ali's right to the caliphate after Muhammad, Shia polemists readily cited such reports to charge that explicit references to Ali had been removed by senior companions for political reasons. Yet the accusation that some words and verses were altered or omitted in the Uthmanid codex also appears in the Shia tradition. Among others, such reports can be found in Kitab al-Qira'at by the ninth-century Shia exegete Ahmad ibn Muhammad al-Sayyari, though he has been widely accused of connections to the Ghulat (lit. 'exaggerators' or 'extremists'). As the faithful recension of the Quran, the codex of Ali is thus said to have been longer than the official one, with explicit references to Ali. This view was apparently popular among Shia scholars before the Buyid dynasty (r. 934–1062). By contrast, any difference between the two codices is rejected by Sunnis because Ali did not impose his recension during his caliphate, while the Shia counterargument is that Ali deliberately remained silent about this divisive matter. Fearing persecution for themselves and their followers, later Twelver Imams may have also adopted religious dissimulation (taqiya) about this issue.

Alternatively, the recension of Ali may have matched the Uthmanic codex, save for the ordering of its content, but it was rejected for political reasons as it also included the partisan commentary of Ali, who is often counted among the foremost exegetes of the Quran. The implication that the Uthmanid codex is faithful has been the prevalent Shia view ever since the Buyids period. Some Shia scholars have thus questioned the authenticity of those traditions that allege textual differences with the Uthmanid codex, tracing them to the Ghulat, or to early Sunni traditions, while Sunnis have in turn blamed Shias for originating the falsification claims and accused them of espousing such views, often indiscriminately. Other Shia scholars have reinterpreted the traditions that may suggest the alteration of the Quran. For instance, a tradition ascribed to Ali suggests that a fourth of the Quran is about the House of Muhammad, or the Ahl al-Bayt, while another fourth is about their enemies. The Uthmanic codex certainly does not meet this description but the inconsistency can be explained by another Shia tradition, which states that the verses of the Quran about the virtuous are primarily directed at the Ahl al-Bayt, while those verses about the evildoers are directed first at their enemies.

=== Hadith ===
Second only to the Quran in authority as a source for religious law and moral guidance in Islam, are Hadith—the record of what Muslims believe to be the words, actions, and the silent approval of Muhammad. While the number of verses pertaining to law in the Quran is relatively few, hadith give direction on everything from details of religious obligations (such as Ghusl or Wudu, ablutions for salat prayer), to the correct forms of salutations and the importance of benevolence to slaves. Thus the "great bulk" of the rules of Sharia (Islamic law) are derived from hadith, rather than the Quran.) Scriptural authority for hadith comes from the Quran which enjoins Muslims to emulate Muhammad and obey his judgments (in verses such as 24:54, 33:21).

Because there were a large number of false hadith, a great deal of effort was expended by scholars in a field known as hadith studies to sift through and grade hadith on a scale of authenticity. In Sunni Islam there are six major authentic hadith collections known as the Kutub al-Sittah (six books) or al-Sihah al-Sittah (the authentic six). The two "most famous" 'Authentic' (Sahih) ḥadīth collections are those of Sahih al-Bukhari and Sahih Muslim — known as the sahihayn (two sahih). These works came out over two centuries after the Uthmanic codex, (the hadith collections do not have original publishing dates but the authors' death dates range from 870 to 915 CE).

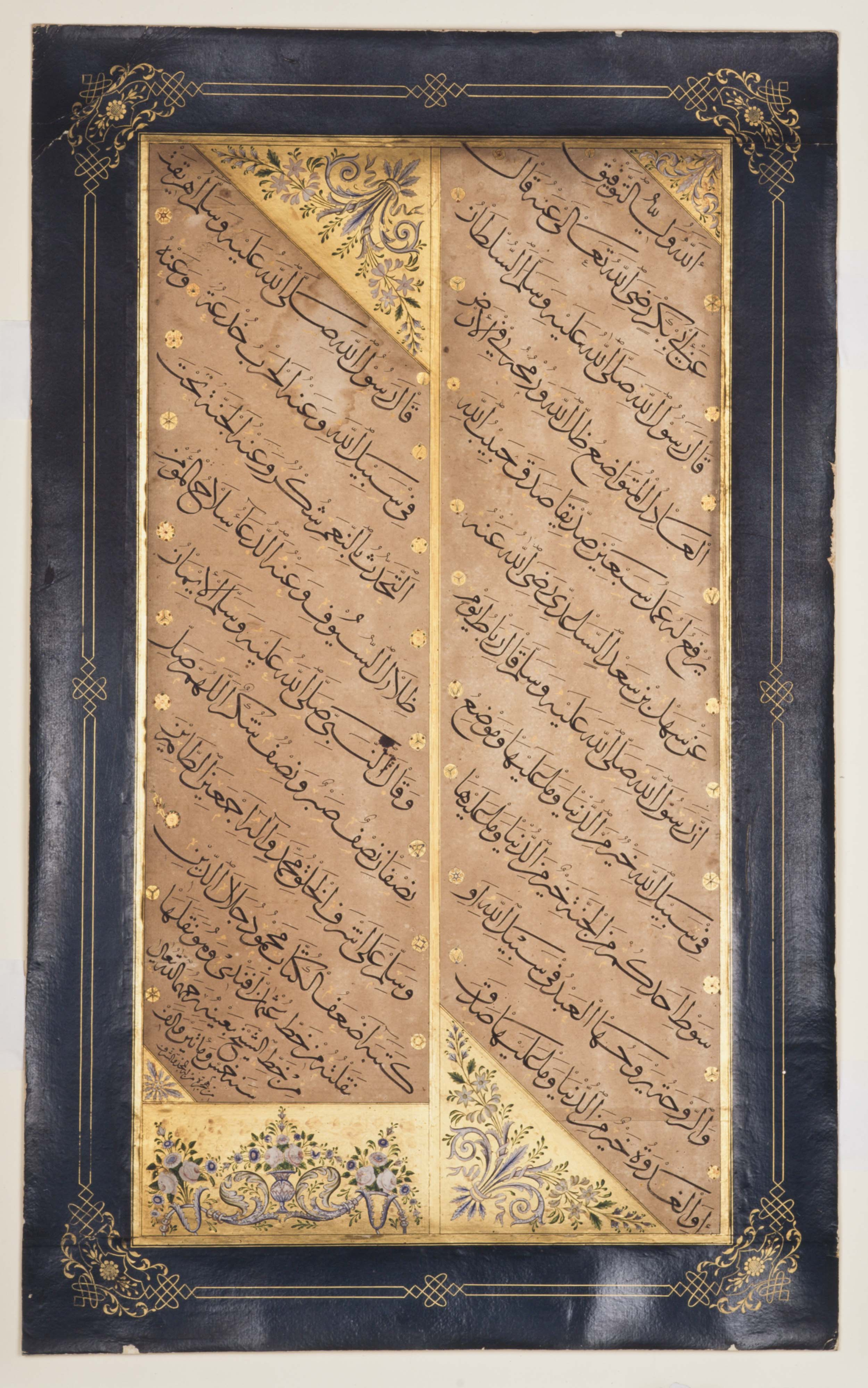
Calligraphic arrangement of eight hadiths dated 1205 AH (1790-91 AD)

Because the Kutub al-Sittah hadith collections used by Sunni Muslims were based on narrators and transmitters that Shia Islam believed treated Ali unfairly and so were not trustworthy, Shia follow different hadith collections. The most famous being "The Four Books", which were compiled by three authors who are known as the 'Three Muhammads'. The Four Books are: Kitab al-Kafi by Muhammad ibn Ya'qub al-Kulayni al-Razi (329 AH), Man la yahduruhu al-Faqih by Muhammad ibn Babuya and Al-Tahdhib and Al-Istibsar both by Shaykh Muhammad Tusi. Shi'a clerics also make use of extensive collections and commentaries by later authors.

Not only were the hadith collections compiled centuries after the Quran, but their canonization also came much later. Scholar Jonathan A. C. Brown has studied the process of canonization of the two "most famous" collections of hadith -- sahihayn of al-Bukhari and Muslim—which went from "controversial to indispensable" over the centuries.

From their very creation, they were subject to withering criticism and rejection: Muslim was forced to argue that his book was merely meant as a 'private collection' (94) and al-Bukhari was accused of plagiarism (95). The 4th/10th and 5th/11th centuries were no kinder, for while the Shafi'is [school of fiqh law] championed the Sahihayn, Malikis were initially enamored of their own texts and 'tangential to the Sahihayn network" (37), while the Hanbalis were openly critical. Not until the mid-5th/11th century did these schools come to a tacit agreement on the status of 'the Sahihayn canon as a measure of authenticity in polemics and exposition of their schools' doctrines' (222); it would be three more centuries before the Hanafis would join them in this assessment. (Note: quotation comes from review by Jonathan Brockopp, not from book author Jonathan Brown)

Brown writes that the books achieved iconic status in the Sunni Muslim community such that public readings of them were made in Cairo in 790 AH/1388 CE to ward off plague and the Moroccan statesman Mawlay Isma'il (d.1727) "dubbed his special troops the 'slaves of al-Bukhari'".

== See also ==
- List of Islamic texts
- List of Shia books
- Prophets and messengers in Islam
- Quranic studies
- Sunnah
- Timeline of the history of Islam (7th century)
