= Codex of Ubayy ibn Ka'b =

Mushaf of the Quran

The codex of Ubayy ibn Ka'b is a mushaf of the Quran that differs from the Uthmanic codex and is attributed to Ubayy ibn Ka'b, a companion of Muhammad. The codices of Ubayy and Uthman differ on point of several textual variants between the two, but more importantly, Ubayy's codex possesses a total of 116 surahs, whereas the codex of Uthman possesses 114. The surahs absent from the Uthmanic codex, but present in that of Ubayy, are Al-Khalʿ (Surah 115) and Al-Ḥafd (Surah 116). These continued to be seen as authoritative and Quranic by several scholars through the eighth century, and evidence for the transmission of the codex is available until the tenth or eleventh centuries. A copy of the codex of Ubayy is unavailable in any extant manuscript, although its historicity is accepted. Islamic scholars documented the text of Ubayy's two unique surahs in addition to the textual variants that distinguished the codex of Ubayy from that of Uthman.

== Historicity ==
Early on, Theodor Noldeke rejected the historicity of the codex of Ubayy (while accepting the codex of Ibn Mas'ud) as he was able to find little documentation of it in the extant Islamic sources. During the 1970s, John Wansbrough and John Burton both argued that the codex of Ubayy did not exist. According to them, the invention of variants attributed to Ubayy's codex served the function of enabling certain figures to create a basis in the Quran for their personal interpretations. Other scholars have found these arguments unconvincing and have now moved towards a view that accept that this codex did exist and goes back to Ubayy. First, the majority of the variants attributed to Ubayy's codex have no effect on the meaning of the text, and therefore do not serve the motive of promoting particular exegetical approaches to the Quran. Second, a number of variants attributed to Ubayy's codex have now been confirmed with manuscript discoveries, particularly with regards to the Sanaa manuscript, which is also a non-Uthmanic codex. More recent studies of the textual reception of Ubayy's codex have shown that it was widely geographically documented among the earliest and most pertinent Islamic sources. These accounts offer detailed observations on the material features of the codex that they purport to have had access to, and occasionally differ in doing so, suggesting that the relevant accounts are not derivative of one another.

== Comparison with other codices ==
The textual variants in the codex of Ubayy sometimes agree with those present in the codex of Ibn Mas'ud, and on other occasions agree with the version in the Uthmanic codex.

One variant in the codex of Ubayy concerns the muqattaʿat. Ubayy's codex included the Ha-Wa-Meem in Surah 39, where it is absent from the codex of Uthman.

== Text and translation ==
=== Surah 115 (Al-Khalʿ) ===
The text of the first unique surah of Ubayy's codex is as follows:

[bi-smi llāhi l-raḥmāni l-raḥīm]

1 allāhumma innā nastaʿīnuka wa- nastaghfiruk

2 wa-nuthnī ʿalayka wa-lā nakfuruk

3 wa-nakhlaʿu wa-natruku man yafjuruk

[In the name of God, the Merciful, the Compassionate]

1 Lord, for aid and forgiveness do we beseech you;

2 We praise you and do not disbelieve you;

3 We denounce and forsake all who disobey you.

=== Surah 116 (Al-Ḥafd) ===
The text of the second unique surah of Ubayy's codex is as follows:

[bi-smi llāhi l-raḥmāni l-raḥīm]

1 allāhumma ʾiyyāka naʿbud

2 wa-laka nuṣallī wa-nasjud

3 wa-ilayka nasʿā wa-naḥfud

4 narjū raḥmatak

5 nakhshā ʿadhābak

6 inna ʿadhābaka bi-l-kuffāri mulḥiq

[In the name of God, the Merciful, the Compassionate]

1 Lord, you we worship;

2 To you we pray and bow low;

3 For you we make haste to serve;

4 We hope for Your mercy;

5 We fear Your torment;

6 Surely your torment will overtake the infidels.

== See also ==
- Mushaf of Aisha
- Mushaf of Ali
