= Ahruf =

Method of transmission of the Quran

According to Islamic tradition, the Quran was revealed to the Islamic prophet Muhammad by the angel Gabriel (Jibrail). The seven reading variants (Arabic: أَحْرُف, romanized: aḥruf, singular: ḥarf), translated as 'styles', 'ways', 'forms' and 'modes', are said to have been taught by Gabriel. Islamic scholars agree that the aḥruf were styles used by the early Muslims to recite the Quran.

The issue of ahruf (lit means letters), whose origin and legality are disputed, is considered problematic to discuss today within the orthodoxy of the Quran's divine origin and preservation. According to some accounts, when Uthman created his official codex, ordered the collection and destruction of other codices collected from different regions -and so expected to be having native different dialects-; other accounts suggest that the writing process was based on the Quraysh dialect, and according to scholars who assumed the 'Ahruf' were dialects in themselves, these dialects were abolished through the work of Uthman's committee. (Note: According to some researchers like John Wansbroughand Yehuda D. Nevo, later known as the Revisionist school of Islamic studies, the canonization of the Quran, through the unification of "various previous texts" into a single, unchanging standard text and the elimination of others, took place over a period of approximately 200 years. They argued that a common method within Islamic tradition was to legitimize a practice by attributing it to a past authority that enjoyed high popular acceptance.) This suggests that the accounts of Uthman's cancellation and burning of the codices may actually refer to a single issue encompassing different codices. While variant readings were initially scorned and criticized as human creations, five centuries later these readings were sanctified by being linked to a divine source.

Today, the terminology that delves deeply into the various readings the Quran, encompassing diverse narrations and schools, is Qira'at, and it is said to be distinct from "ahruf”, that also go back to Muhammad according to the Hadith.

== Etymology ==
The word aḥruf is the plural of paucity of the Arabic word ḥarf, which has multiple meanings. It can refer to the letters that form a word, and the aspects, borders or sides of an object. For this reason, Yasin Dutton suggests the Quran is being described as "linguistically seven-sided". Abu Amr al-Dani posits two explanations of ḥarf's meaning in the context of the seven aḥruf: that it refers to "dialectical variation" in the sense that language has multiple "sides", or that it refers to a reading of the Quran by virtue of being part of it; in each reading a letter (ḥarf) has been modified.

== Scriptural basis ==
The Quran itself talks about it being recorded in the preserved tablet in heaven (al-lawh al-mahfooz), but makes no mention of there being any variant modes/forms/readings of it. However, there are numerous references to the seven aḥruf in Sunni hadith literature. These are principally found in three "clusters" of similar narrations. Seven aḥruf traditions are included in Sahih al-Bukhari and 21 traditions in the Musnad of Ahmad ibn Hanbal. Other aḥruf traditions and references are found in the Tafsir of Muhammad ibn Jarir al-Tabari, the Musnad of Abu Ya'la, the Musannaf of Ibn Abi Shaybah, the Jami' of Ma'mar ibn Rashid and most other classical hadith collections, including versions attributed to Abu Hurairah and Abdullah ibn Masud.

=== First cluster of narrations ===
The most prevalent cluster of narrations describe a dispute between Umar ibn al-Khattab and a certain Hisham ibn Hakim regarding the recitation of Surah Al-Furqan, before the former requests Muhammad to adjudicate on the matter. One such narration can be found in the Muwatta of Malik ibn Anas:

I heard Hisham ibn Hakim ibn Hizam reciting Surat al-Furqan differently to the way I recited it, and it was the Prophet who had taught me it. I was about to rush up to him, but I allowed him time to finish [his prayer]. Then I grabbed him by his cloak and took him to the Messenger of God, and said, "Messenger of God, I heard this man reciting Surat al-Furqan differently to the way you taught me." The Messenger of God said, "Let him go." He then said "Recite, Hisham", and Hisham recited in the same way that he had done before. The Messenger of God said, "It was sent down like that." He then told me to recite, and I did so, and he said, "It was sent down like that. This Quran was sent down according to seven aḥruf, so recite whatever of it is easy [for you].

Variants of the narration are included in all six of the canonical Sunni hadith collections, including Sahih Muslim and Sahih al-Bukhari.

=== Second cluster of narrations ===
A second cluster of narrations describes how the ahruf encompass the substitution of words in more detail, including a hadith in the Musannaf of Abd al-Razzaq citing Ubayy ibn Ka'b:

I disagreed with one of my companions regarding an āya and so we went to the Messenger of God about it. He said, "Recite, Ubayy", and I did so. Then he said to the other man, "Recite", and he did so. The Prophet said, "Both of you are right and correct." I said, "We can't both be right and correct!" The Prophet pushed me in the chest (dafaʿa [ḍaraba] fī ṣadrī) and said, "The Quran was sent down to me and I was asked, 'According to one ḥarf or two?' I said, 'According to two.' I was then asked, 'According to two ḥarfs or three?' I said, 'According to three.' This went on until we had reached seven ḥarfs. All of them are acceptable as long as you do not mix up an āya of mercy with an āya of punishment, or an āya of punishment with an āya of mercy. If [the verse ends with], ʾazīzun ḥakīm ('Mighty and Wise'), and you say samīʿun ʿalīm ('All-Hearing and All-Knowing'), then Allah is All-Hearing and All-Knowing."

Variants of the narration are included in the Musnad of Ahmad ibn Hanbal and the Sunan of Abu Dawud, with Ibn Hanbal's recension including the addition of ghafūran raḥiman ('Forgiving and Merciful').

=== Third cluster of narrations ===
A third cluster of narrations, citing Ibn Abbas and included in Sahih Muslim, describe Muhammad relating how he asked Gabriel to recite in an increasing number of ḥarfs before the latter stopped him at seven.

== Differences ==
The exact meaning and nature of the seven ahruf has been debated by Muslim scholars. The 9th-century hadith specialist Ibn Hibban, thought there were up to forty explanations for the aḥruf traditions.

The majority of explanations identify the seven aḥruf with Arabic dialects, although a minority identifies them as categories of Quranic material. Muslim scholars also disagreed on whether the number seven was to be interpreted literally or metaphorically.

=== Why there are differences between the aḥruf ===
==== Different dialects ====
According to Abu Ammaar Yasir Qadhi:

As for what is meant by these seven aḥruf, there is a great deal of difference on this issue. Ibn Qutaybah (d. 276 A.H.) recorded thirty-five opinions on the issue, and as-Suyootee listed over forty. Ibn Sa'adan (d. 231 A.H.), a famous grammarian and reciter of the Qur'aan, even declared that the true meaning of the ahruf was known only to Allaah, and thus to attempt to investigate into this issue was futile!

Aḥruf were banned about 1400 years ago, according to Islamic literature, when Uthman destroyed all but the official copies of the Quran, so the variants cannot be compared today. According to the explanations given by many sources, the differences reflect the differences in tribal dialects of the era and region, or at least "subtleties of pronunciations and accents".

Several Muslim scholars identified the seven aḥruf with Arabic dialects (lughāt). Ibn al-Jazari mentions Abu Ubaid al-Qasim bin Salam as believing the ahruf referred to the dialects spoken by seven Arab tribes, including Quraysh and Banu Tamim. Bismika Allahuma website (Note: "Bismika Allahuma is a Muslim apologetics website and our purpose is to facilitate Muslim responses to the various mendacious polemics and distortions of Islam.") also states that at least according to one scholarly opinion there were seven aḥruf because there were seven Arab tribes – Quraysh, Hudhayl, Tameem, Hawaazin, Thaqeef, Kinaanah and Yemen (Note: other scholars gave the names of other tribes) -- each with their own dialect at the time the Quran was revealed. "Thus, under this opinion, various verses would be pronounced according to the pronunciation of that particular tribe, and words from one dialect would be replaced by other words used by that particular tribe."

Other views, according to al-Jazari, include the ahruf referring to seven dialects found in the Quran – a position held by Ahmad al-Harrani – or every Arabic dialect. Al-Jazari criticises these stances on the grounds that Umar and Hisham, who dispute over the recitation of Surah al-Furqan in some ahruf traditions, both hailed from the same tribe, Quraysh.

The Australian Islamic da‘wah (proselytizing) media network OnePath Network states that hundreds of companions of the Prophet (ṣaḥābah) "memorised the complete Quran in seven official dialects, all of which were considered valid ways of reciting the Quran", the seven dialects being the seven ahruf.

Oxford Islamic Studies Online writes that "according to classical Muslim sources", the variations that crept up before Uthman created the "official" Quran "dealt with subtleties of pronunciations and accents (qirāʿāt) and not with the text itself which was transmitted and preserved in a culture with a strong oral tradition."

Linguistic variation

In the view of Ibn al-Jazari, the seven ahruf refer to seven types of linguistic variation. These range from changes in short vowels that do not change the Uthmanic rasm or meaning of a verse, to differences in both and word order. Similar views were held by Ibn Qutaybah, al-Zarkashi and Abu al-Fadl al-Razi.

==== Other explanations for Ahruf and elements of it ====
Categories of Quranic content

According to Ibn al-Jazari, a group of scholars identified the ahruf with seven categories of Quranic content – such as stories, prayers and parables – or legal judgements, such as haram (forbidden), halal (permitted), mutashbih (ambiguous), etc. Proponents of the second view adduce a hadith narrated by al-Tabarani attributed to Abdullah ibn Masud, describing the Quran as being sent down from seven gates of heaven according to seven ahruf, before listing seven types of legal judgement. Al-Jazari comments that ahruf, as defined in this tradition, may be referring to a separate concept since it is mentioned elsewhere in the context of Quranic recitation. He alternatively proposes that the legal judgements refer to the seven heavenly gates, not the ahruf.

Diversity

Khan and Khatib argue ahruf are "multiple diverse equally valid alternate readings" for diverse audiences, quoting from Jami' al-Tirmidhi where Muhammad appeals to the angel Jibril: “‘O Jibrīl! I have been sent to an illiterate nation among whom are the elderly woman, the old man, the boy and the girl, and the man who cannot read a book at all.’ He said: ‘O Muḥammad! Indeed the Qur’an was revealed in seven aḥruf (i.e., seven different ways of reciting).’”

Meaning of seven

A group of Muslim scholars argued that seven should be interpreted metaphorically, due to the tendency of Arabs to use numbers such as 7, 70 and 700 to denote large quantities. In their view, the ahruf were intended to permit the recitation of the Quran in any Arabic dialect or a multiplicity of variants. Ibn al-Jazari objects on the basis of the hadith which describes Gabriel granting Muhammad ḥarfs. In one of its recensions, Muhammad is quoted as saying "I knew that the number had come to an end." when seven ḥarfs had been reached. According to al-Jazari, this is evidence that seven is a specific value. However, Dutton maintains that it can still be interpreted metaphorically, as the number seven indicates limited multiplicity in a manner that others do not.

=== What happened to the ahruf ===
According to Bilal Philips the downfall of ahruf came from "a rivalry" of "some Arab tribes" over which ahruf was superior, and that in the end only the harf of the Quraysh tribe remained.

Bilal Philips writes that the Quran continued to be read according to the seven ahruf until midway through Caliph 'Uthman's rule when some confusion arose in the outlying provinces concerning the Quran's recitation. Aisha Abdurrahman Bewley talks not of different tribes but of different regions of the new empire following different 'ahruf' of different prominent companions of the prophet (Sahaabah): "the Syrians followed Ubayy ibn Ka'b, the Kufans followed Abdullah ibn Masud, the people of Hims followed Miqdad ibn Aswad, and the people of Basra followed Abu Musa." Hudhayfah ibn al-Yaman reportedly observing these regional differences and on returning to Madina told Uthman, "Take this umma in hand before they differ about the Book like the Christians and Jews."

Philips writes that some Arab tribes had begun to boast about the superiority of their ahruf and a rivalry began to develop. At the same time, some new Muslims also began mixing the various forms of recitation out of ignorance.

The "official copies" of the Quran Caliph 'Uthman decided to make were according to the writing conventions of the Quraysh tribe, Philips writes. Uthman sent them along with the Quranic reciters to the major centres of Islam. This decision was approved by Companions of the Prophet (Sahaabah) and all unofficial copies of the Quran were destroyed so that the Quran began to be read in only one harf. Thus, the Quran which is available throughout the world today is written and recited only according to the harf of Quraysh.

Do they still exist anywhere?

According to at least one source (Ammar Khatib and Nazir Khan) parts of ahruf can still be found in some works of tafsīr (commentary on the Quran). (Note: "When reading classical works of tafsīr, it is common to encounter narrations that mention that a particular verse was recited differently by a companion (most often ʿAbd Allāh ibn Masʿūd), typically with a word substitution, addition, or omission. A number of these variant readings are readily encountered in the canonical books of Hadith and a few are mentioned in Ṣaḥīḥ al-Bukhārī. For instance, when ʿAlqamah ibn Qays (d. 62 AH) traveled to Greater Syria, he met the companion Abū al-Dardāʾ, and the latter asked ʿAlqamah about how Ibn Masʿūd recited Sūrat al-Layl; ʿAlqamah responded that Ibn Masʿūd recited verse 3 as “wa-al-dhakari wa-al-unthá” (and by the male and the female) instead of “wa mā khalaqa al-dhakara wa-al-unthá” (and by that which created the male and the female), whereupon Abū al-Dardāʾ testified that he had learned the verse in the same way from Muhammad. This variant is said to represent one of the aḥruf in the recitation of the Qur’an that was no longer recited after the codex of ʿUthmān was established.")

== Comparison to Qira'at ==
The identification of the seven ahruf with the qira’at -- the seven readings of the Quran (canonized by Ibn Mujahid) -- has been rejected by Muslim and Western scholars. Medieval Quranic scholar Ibn al-Jazari mentioned the rejection of the notion as a point of agreement among subject specialists, while Christopher Melchert stated that it is both "contrary to reason" and "unsupported by the Islamic tradition". Others who opposed this view include al-Qurtubi and al-Suyuti, with the latter citing six other scholarly authorities against the view.

According to Ahmad 'Ali al Imam, Ibn al-Jazari (1350-1429 CE) described three general explanations for what happened to the Ahruf.

1. One group of scholars, exemplified by Ibn Hazm, held that Uthman preserved all seven ahruf.
2. Another group, exemplified by Al-Tabari, held that Uthman preserved only one of the seven, unifying the ummah under it.
3. Finally, ibn al Jazari held what he said was the majority view, which is that the orthography of the Uthmanic copies accommodated a number of ahruf (how many is unspecified).

Bilal Philips

Bilal Philips writes that "after the seven ahruf were reduced to one" (that of the Quraysh), under the direction of Caliph 'Uthman, all of the methods of recitation (all the Qira'at) were based on this mode. But despite all being subsets of just one of the seven aḥruf, all these Qira'at variants can also be traced back to Muhammad. Bilal Philips writes that

A Qirâ'ât is for the most part a method of pronunciation used in the recitations of the Qur'an. These methods are different from the seven forms or modes (ahruf) in which the Qur'an was revealed. The seven modes were reduced to one, that of the Quraysh, during the era of Caliph 'Uthman, and all of the methods of recitation are based on this mode. The various methods have all been traced back to the Prophet through a number of Sahaabah [Companions of the Prophet] who were most noted for their Qur'anic recitations. That is, these Sahaabah recited the Qur'an to the Prophet or in his presence and received his approval. Among them were the following: Ubayy Ibn K'ab, 'Alee Ibn Abi Taalib, Zayd Ibn Thaabit, 'Abdullah Ibn Mas'ud, Abu ad-Dardaa and Abu Musaa al-Ash'aree. Many of the other Sahaabah learned from these masters.

Thus the Qirâ'ât (methods of pronunciation) are based on the single harf (mode of revelation) that was selected during the era of Caliph Uthman, and these Qirā’āt were approved by Muhammad.

On transmission of Quran, Philips writes that among the next generation of Muslims (the Tabi'in), there arose many scholars who learned the various methods of recitation from the Sahaabah and taught them to others. Centres of Quranic recitation developed in Medina, Mecca, Kufa, Basra and Syria, leading to the evolution of Quranic recitation into an independent science. By the mid-eighth century CE, there existed many outstanding scholars considered specialists in the field of recitation. Most of their methods of recitations were authenticated by chains of reliable narrators ending with the Prophet.

Aisha Abdurrahman Bewley

In writing about "The Seven Qira'at of the Quran", Aisha Abdurrahman Bewley suggests some of the diversity of the ahruf lived on in the Qira'at. The "official" Uthmanic mus'haf to "unite the Muslims on a single copy" of the Quran thinned out variation, but because it contained only rasm or a "skeleton" of the Arabic with "no diacritical marks", it still allowed for diversity of oral transmission.

The Qurayshi dialect was favoured in this [i.e. the elimination of all but one rasm] and this eliminated much of the diversity, but some of it was still reflected in the different readings because it was essentially a business of oral transmission and there were no diacritical marks in the 'Uthmanic script. People recited the Qur'an as they had read it from their teacher and they in turn passed on this oral transmission.

Ammar Khatib and Nazir Khan

Ammar Khatib and Nazir Khan also write that "the famous ten qirāʾāt studied today represent only a limited assortment of the variations that existed prior to the ʿUthmānic codex" which is now narrowing down to ahruf that can fit the rasm of ʿUthmānic's codex.

According to Ammar Khatib and Nazir Khan the "vast majority of specialists in Qur’anic sciences" agree with their (Khatib and Khan's) argument on aḥruf and Qiraat that (among other things) difference among aḥruf are manifested "in the following ways":

- Singularity, duality, plurality, masculinity, and femininity.
- Taṣrīf al-Afʿāl (Verbal Morphology)—verb tense, form, grammatical person.
- Iʿrāb (grammatical case endings).
- Omission, substitution, or addition of words.
- Word order.
- Ibdāl (alternation between two consonants or between words).

(The list is not "an exclusive or exhaustive categorization").

=== Questions ===
Conservative Islamic scholar Abu Ammaar Yasir Qadhi stated in a 2020 interview that "every single student of knowledge ... who studies ulm of Quran" knows "that the most difficult topics are ahruf and qira’at", so vexing that even "the most advanced of our scholars, they are not quite fully certain how to solve all of it and answer questions in there", and so sensitive that it "should never be brought up in public” and is "not something you discuss among the masses".

Were the variant ahruf readings approved by God?

Other reports of what the Prophet said (as well as some scholarly commentary) seem to contradict the presence of variant readings.

Abu Abd Al-Rahman al-Sulami writes, "The reading of Abu Bakr, Umar, Uthman and Zayd ibn Thabit and that of all the Muhajirun and the Ansar was the same. They would read the Quran according to the Qira'at al-'ammah. This is the same reading which was read out twice by the Prophet to Gabriel in the year of his death. Zayd ibn Thabit was also present in this reading [called] the 'Ardah-i akhirah. It was this very reading that he taught the Quran to people till his death". According to Ibn Sirin, "The reading on which the Quran was read out to the prophet in the year of his death is the same according to which people are reading the Quran today".

Examining the hadith of Umar's surprise in finding out "this Quran has been revealed in seven Ahruf", Suyuti, a noted 15th-century Islamic theologian, concludes the "best opinion" of this hadith is that it is "mutashabihat", i.e. its meaning "cannot be understood."

Another critic, Shezad Salem has doubts about the validity of the hadith:

it is known that Hisham had accepted Islam on the day Makkah was conquered. If this Hadith is accepted, it would mean that for almost twenty years even the closest Companions of the Prophet like ‘Umar were unaware of the Qur’an being revealed in some other reading.

At least two Sahih al-Bukhari hadith explicitly state the Qur'an was revealed in the dialect of the Quraysh (Muhammad's tribe) -- making no mention of other ahruf—and that in case there are disagreements over recitation, this should clear everything up.

Narrated Anas bin Malik: (The Caliph 'Uthman ordered Zaid bin Thabit, Said bin Al-As, 'Abdullah bin Az-Zubair and 'Abdur-Rahman bin Al-Harith bin Hisham to write the Quran in the form of a book (Mushafs) and said to them. “In case you disagree with Zaid bin Thabit (Al-Ansari) regarding any dialectic Arabic utterance of the Quran, then write it in the dialect of Quraish, for the Quran was revealed in this dialect.” So they did it.

Narrated Anas bin Malik: Hudhaifa bin Al-Yaman came to Uthman at the time when the people of Sham and the people of Iraq were waging war to conquer Arminya and Adharbijan. Hudhaifa was afraid of their (the people of Sham and Iraq) differences in the recitation of the Qur'an, so he said to 'Uthman, "O chief of the Believers! Save this nation before they differ about the Book (Quran) as Jews and the Christians did before." So 'Uthman sent a message to Hafsa saying, "Send us the manuscripts of the Qur'an so that we may compile the Qur'anic materials in perfect copies and return the manuscripts to you." Hafsa sent it to 'Uthman. 'Uthman then ordered Zaid bin Thabit, 'Abdullah bin AzZubair, Said bin Al-As and 'AbdurRahman bin Harith bin Hisham to rewrite the manuscripts in perfect copies. 'Uthman said to the three Quraishi men, "In case you disagree with Zaid bin Thabit on any point in the Qur'an, then write it in the dialect of Quraish, the Qur'an was revealed in their tongue." They did so, and when they had written many copies, 'Uthman returned the original manuscripts to Hafsa. 'Uthman sent to every Muslim province one copy of what they had copied, and ordered that all the other Qur'anic materials, whether written in fragmentary manuscripts or whole copies, be burnt. Said bin Thabit added, "A Verse from Surat Ahzab was missed by me when we copied the Qur'an and I used to hear Allah's Apostle reciting it. So we searched for it and found it with Khuzaima bin Thabit Al-Ansari. (That Verse was): ‘Among the Believers are men who have been true in their covenant with Allah.’ (33.23)”

Furthermore, while some hadith refer to ahruf, there is no mention of seven ahruf or of different ways of reciting the Quran in the Quran itself, nor does the Quran ever refer to itself in the plural, (for example, 75:16-19). Since there are multiple verses of the Quran declaring that "our revelations" have been "explained in detail", (6:98, 6:114, 41:3) some mention of the existence multiple recitation or variants there would be expected

=== Other ideas ===
Javed Ahmad Ghamidi questions those hadith which purport "variant readings". He also insists on the basis of Quranic verses (Quran 87:6-7, 75:16-19) that Quran was compiled in the life of Muhammad, hence he questions those hadith which report compilation of Quran in Uthman's period: Most of these narrations are reported by Ibn Shihab al-Zuhri, who Imam Layth Ibn Sa‘d considered an unreliable source. In his letter to Imam Malik, Imam Layth wrote:

And when we would meet Ibn Shihab, there would arise a difference of opinion in many issues. When any one of us would ask him in writing about some issue, he, in spite of being so learned, would give three very different answers, and he would not even be aware of what he had already said. It is because of this that I have left him – something which you did not like.

It is said that Abu Ubaid al-Qasim bin Salam (d. 224 AH) selected twenty-five readings in his book. The seven readings which are famous in current times were selected by Ibn Mujahid. The 20th-century Pakistani theologian Javed Ahmad Ghamidi writes:

[I]t is generally accepted that [the number of valid readings] cannot be ascertained, but every reading is Qur’an which has been reported through a correct chain of narration, [is] found in any way in the masahif prepared by Uthman, and [is correct] as far as the Arabic language is concerned.

== See also ==
- Ten recitations
- Seven readers
- Special recitations
- Hizb Rateb, in Sufism
- Salka, in Sufism
