= Mushaf of Aisha =

Mushaf of Aisha is a purported mushaf of the Quran that according to certain Islamic traditions was in the possession of Aisha, the third wife of Muhammed.

According to Arthur Jeffery, it is highly unlikely that it was a pre-Uthmanic text collection of verses. al-Tirmidhi and al-Bukhari have reported that Aisha utilized the mushaf for personal purposes and that it was copied by her mawla Abd Vūnus. It is also probable that the mushaf was ascribed to the way she was known to recite the Quran's Uthmanic text, as about a dozen of variants in reading are attributed to Aisha (of which all are supported by some other early authorities).

== See also ==
- Mushaf of Ali
