= Codex of Ibn Mas'ud =

Purported early Quranic variant

The codex of Ibn Mas'ud is a purported mushaf of the Quran allegedly attributed to Abd Allah ibn Mas'ud, a companion of Muhammad.

This variant has not been definitively found in any existing early Quranic manuscript, but details about it are mentioned in literary references and historical accounts. Codex Mashhad is thought to be a combination of the canonized mushaf of Uthman with Ibn Mas'ud's arrangement.

Historical accounts are inconsistent regarding the details of Ibn Mas'ud's version. However, the reports indicate that Ibn Mas'ud's mushaf arranges the chapters differently from the canonical version and excludes the first chapter, as well as the two chapters known as Al-Mu'awwidhatayn. It is also believed that Ibn Mas'ud had a special reading that is now forgotten.

This mushaf is reported to have supporters as late as the 9th century, specifically in the city of Kufa.

== See also ==
- Codex of Ubayy ibn Ka'b
- Mushaf of Ali
