= Digital Quran =

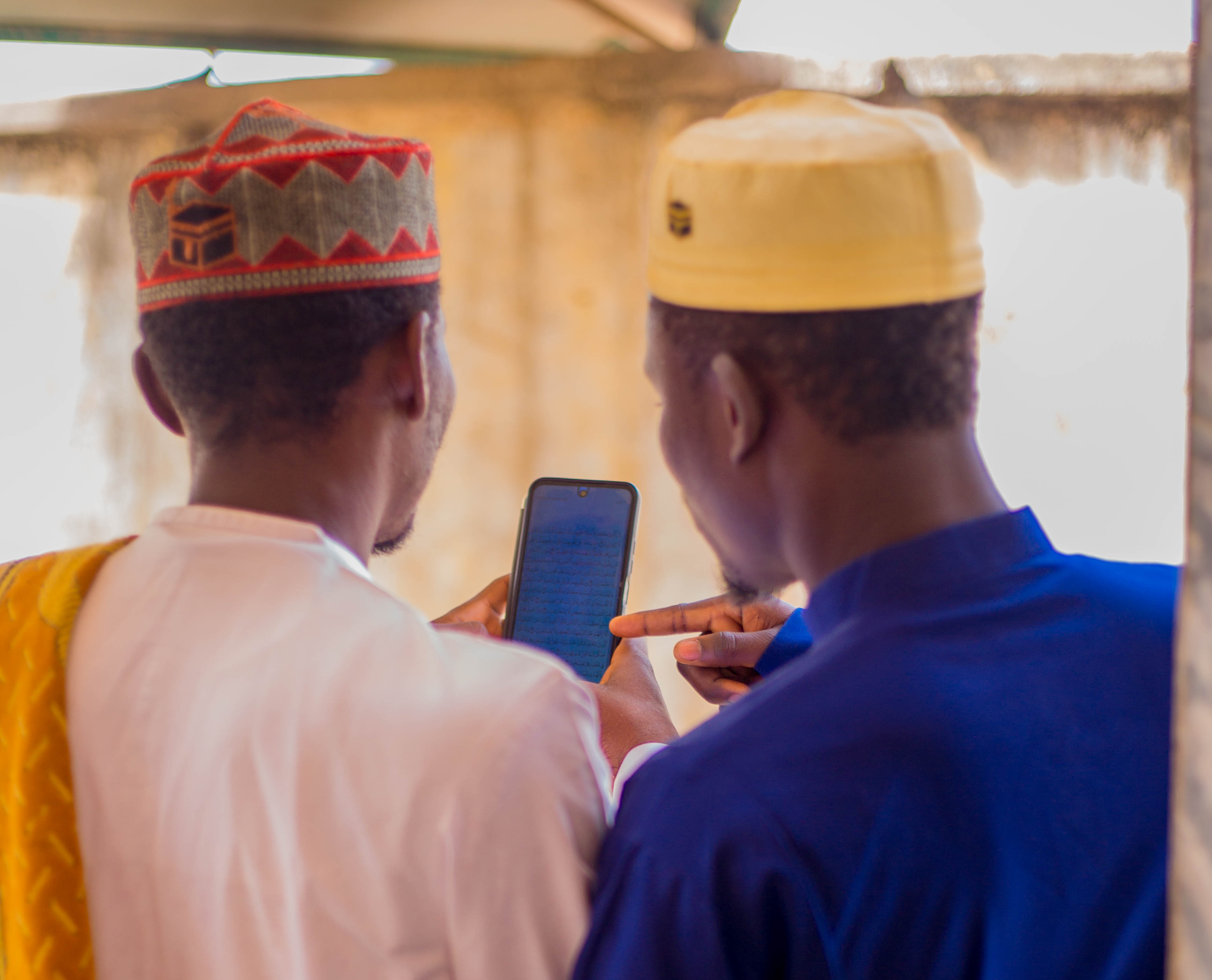
Two men read the Qur'an on a mobile phone

A digital Quran is a text of the Qur'an processed or distributed as an electronic text, or more specifically to an electronic device dedicated to displaying the text of the Qur'an and playing digital recordings of Qur'an readings.

== History ==
Qur'anic software on CD-ROM has been developed since the early 1990s. Online texts began to be hosted by Islamic websites from the 2000s. Such a device has first been marketed in Indonesia beginning in. These devices were capable of audio playback of recorded recitations of the Qur'an with synchronized on-screen Arabic text. It allowed basic navigation of the Quran with the ability for the user to select a specific surah (chapter) and ayah (verse). Translations of the Quran to other languages were also included, sometimes synchronized with the original Arabic recitations. The products were mass-produced in China at an affordable price; however this was achieved at the sacrifice of expenditure on research and development. Subsequent models introduced color screens. Since the availability of more powerful mobile devices such as smartphones, focus has shifted on the production of Quranic software for such devices rather than dedicated "digital Quran" devices.

== Usage ==
There is debate surrounding to what degree a digital form of the Qur'an should be treated like a hard copy in terms of etiquette when reciting from it. For example, should the practices of wudu, qibla, or brushing one's teeth with a miswak be observed while reading from a digital Qur'an.

Commenters speculated about how the special barakah or contagion heuristic associated with the Qur'an translates to electronic texts. Other observers noted that this way of thinking is foreign to the devices users, who adopt western digital technology unthinkingly. Myrvold (2010) summarizes the debate on how Qur'anic etexts and the devices holding them should be handled, citing a fatwa issued by the "Ask Imam" website to the effect that ritual purity should only be regarded in connection with such a device during the time Qur'anic text is actually being displayed. Mohammed Zakariah has come to the conclusion that it is because of the digital Qur'an that Islam has been able to spread and diversify among cultures. This has led to the expansion of Islam among people of faith, scholars who are now able to study the book and scientists that see new opportunity arise. Thomas Hoffmann also discusses in his book on new information and technologies that it is because of these new and creative ways of simplifying the Qur'an that the world sees a new wave of "lay" users rather than experts and self proclaimed experts in the field. Another Journal by Engku Alwi went to college campuses to see how the new form of technology, phone and tablet applications were seen by over 200 Muslim students. This concluded that it was well received and even had good effects on recitation and memorization but that a large percentage were worried or confused by the rules of recitation when using the device.

== As a digital muṣḥaf ==
A digital Qur'ān serves as a digital muṣḥaf, and faces unique challenges because of it. The critical challenges to produce a flawless digital muṣḥaf are correct encoding, correct computer typography, and facsimile rendering on all browsers, operating systems and devices.

1. Correct encoding is hampered by constraints imposed by the Unicode Standard. For instance, only recently the extra characters were encoded to represent the so-called open tanwīn. Correct encoding is also hampered by the fact that input methods, i.e., keyboard layouts for Arabic, are based on modern everyday orthography, which differs from Qur'ān orthography in many respects: there are more characters used in the Qur'ān and some characters are different in terms of Unicode, such as yā' with or without dots in final position.

2. Correct computer typography is hampered by mechanisms that are lacking because the industry is not aware that they are needed. In particular the category of "amphibious characters", characters that can occur as both main letters and as diacritics depending on context, cannot be handled by conventional font layout engines. Last but not least, correct computer typography should reproduce Islamic script as accurately as possible. Unfortunately, Arabic typography has a bias to adapt or reduce itself to constraints of Western technology that was not designed to handle Arabic at all. This circumstance adds an obvious complication to the task of producing a flawless digital Qur'ān.

3. Facsimile rendering on all devices is de facto impossible with conventional computer typography, because it depends on proprietary operating systems, proprietary font layout engines and often inaccurate and incomplete Arabic typefaces.

The first digital muṣḥaf that takes all these considerations into account is the Omani Digital Muṣḥaf, which is described in a webcast by the Bibliotheca Alexandrina in Egypt.

== Recitation ==
Since the first digital versions of the Qur'an, more digital resources relating to the Qur'an and Islam have emerged as well. One can find videos containing Tajweed (recitation) on sites to equip them in learning recitation. This can be helpful because both beginner and professional resources can be found and used as tools in learning the practice of Tajweed. If the digital content and context of what these followers are using is trustworthy, then listening to Tajweed online can help to provide "spiritual merit" to them. The art of Tajweed is very important in Muslim culture and if followers choose to use these online resources to explore this art, then it can enhance their prayer lives. Through the use of digital resources, a follower of Islam is given the ability to learn even if their life circumstances (work, location, health, etc.) limit them from being able to physically go somewhere to learn about the Qur'an and Islam. Today, there are also Quran pens available in which when pen touch to a specific Quran, the pen recite the verses aloud and provide translations.

== Issues ==
An issue emerging alongside the growing usage of digital copies of the Qur'an is confirming the authenticity of digital copies. Given that the Qur'an has been maintained in its original, unedited state for fourteen centuries, maintaining this originality against tampering is of the utmost importance for digital Qur'anic content. While hard copies of the Qur'an are meticulously examined to assure accuracy before they are made available for sale, many digital copies that are available for free on the internet are not subjected to same degree of scrutiny. Among online copies of the Qur'an, inaccuracies and tampering that have been found went gone largely unnoticed by readers of the website. Because of this, there are many proposed methods to rectify the issue of authenticity and establish a method to verify the integrity of digital Qur'anic content. One controversial method of verifying and displaying that a piece of digital Qur'anic content is authentic is the usage of digital watermarks on verified digital images of the Qur'an, which some argue is a form of modifying the Qur'an as well. Other proposed methods of ensuring authenticity include cryptography, steganography, and usage of digital signatures. Digital copies of the Qur'an can be found in many different styles of Arabic and in each style the diacritics (symbols or punctuation in Arabic writing) differ. Diacritics being misplaced or altered does not affect everyone's ability to get the correct meaning out of this text, but it does affect non-Arabic speakers' ability. One method used to try to prevent the meaning of the Qur'an from being misconstrued is the use of the Qur'an Quote Algorithm. This algorithm allows people to take a verse and search the true meaning of it by out the diacritics which could be interpreted incorrectly by non-Arabic speakers and evaluates just the words.

== See also ==
- Islam and modernity
