= Codex Mashhad =

Quranic manuscript from 1st century AH, attributed to Ali

- Āstān‑i Quds‑i Rażavī Library, MS 18 and MS 4116
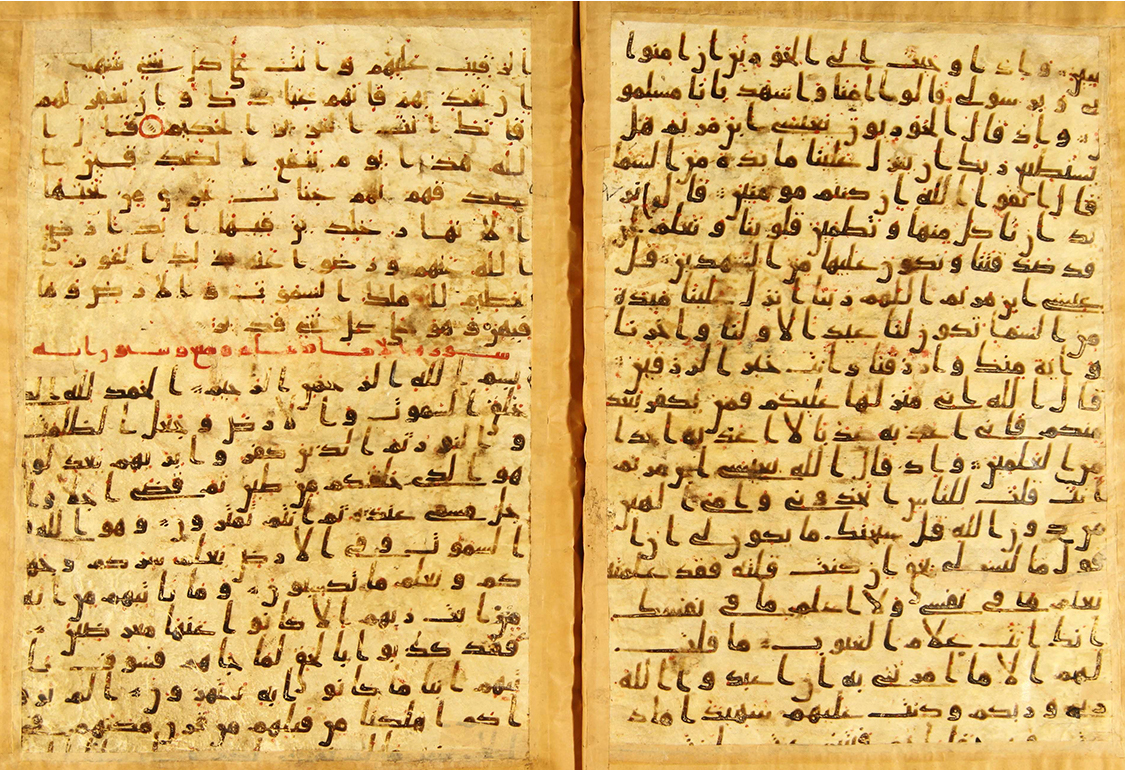
- Codex Mashhad, MS 18, Folios 50r, 49v
- Date: 9 major manuscripts (containing 50% of the Quran) after 790 CE, some around 719 CE while others disputed.
- Place of origin: Likely Medina or Kufa
- Language: Arabic
- Scribe: Ali (According to an eleventh century endowment)
- Material: Parchment; Ink
- Size: Approximately 50 × 35 cm; 252 folios
- Format: Vertical
- Condition: Damaged edges on some parchment leaves
- Script: Hijazi, type BIa
- Contents: From the beginning of the Quran to the end of Surah 18, and from the middle of Surah 20 to the end
- Additions: Recopying of Surah al-Fatihah by Wājih al-Shaḥḥāmī; Repairs using fragments from later Kufic Qurans and some modern naskh script
- Previously kept: In the possession of al-Muqriʾ al-Sarawī; Later housed at the Shrine of Imām al-Riḍā
- Discovered: Second part discovered within mausoleum walls in 1970
- Other: First part restored in 1834; Second part repaired in 2011

Codex Mashhad is an old codex of the Qurʾān, now mostly preserved in two manuscripts, MSS 18 and 4116, in the Āstān-i Quds Library, Mashhad, Iran. The first manuscript in 122 folios and the second in 129 folios together constitute more than 90% of the text of the Qurʾān. The current codex is in two separate volumes, MSS 18 and 4116. The former contains the first half of the Qurʾān, from the beginning to the end of the 18th sūra, al-Kahf, while the latter comprises the second half, from the middle of the 20th sūra, Ṭā-Hā, to the end of the Qurʾān. In their present form, both parts of Codex Mashhad have been repaired, partially completed with pieces from later Kufic Qurʾāns and sometimes in a present-day nashkī hand.

Codex Mashhad has almost all the elements and features of the oldest known Qurʾānic codices. The dual volumes of the main body, written in ḥijāzī or māʾil script, are the only ḥijāzī manuscripts in vertical format in Iran. Like all ancient ḥijāzī codices, Codex Mashhad contains variant readings, regional differences of Qurʾānic codices, orthographic peculiarities, and copyists’ errors, partly corrected by later hands. The script and orthography of the Codex show instances of archaic and not yet completely recognized rules, manifested in various spelling peculiarities. Illumination and ornamentation are not found even in sūra-headbands; rather, some crude sūra dividers have been added later and are found only on adjoining sections.

The script in this manuscript is similar to Codex M a VI 165 at Tübingen (Germany), Codex Arabe 331 at the Bibliothèque nationale de France, and Kodex Wetzstein II 1913 at Staatsbibliothek (Berlin).

== Chronology ==
Codex Mashhad was written on parchment in a large format (approximately 50×35 cm), in Medina or Kufa. It likely remained in Kufa for several decades before being transferred to the region of Khurasan, where it was held by scholars and reciters of Qurʾān in Nishapur. A few centuries later, the then-owner drafted an endowment deed at the beginning of the manuscript, dedicating it to the shrine of Imām ʿAlī al-Riḍā. According to the deed, at that time the codex comprised two separate volumes bound as one.

For nine centuries since, the two parts – numbered 18 and 4116 – have been preserved in the Āstān-i Quds Library in Mashhad. Through intensive scholarly study in recent decades, Codex Mashhad’s exceptional status has become evident among other early Qurʾānic manuscripts held there.

- 100 AH / 719 CE: Original production of the manuscript in Madīna or Kūfa
- 100–300 AH / 719–913 CE: Probable presence of the codex in Kūfa
- 300–400 AH / 913–1010 CE: Rearrangement of sūras in Iraq or Iran
- 400–500 AH / 1010–1107 CE: Presence of the codex in Nīshāpūr
- C. 490 AH / 1097 CE: Ownership by al-Muqriʾ al-Sarawī
- C. 490 AH / 1097 CE: Recopying of Sūrat al-Fātiḥah by Wājih al-Shaḥḥāmī
- C. 500–520 AH / 1107–1127 CE: Endowment of the codex to the shrine of Imām al-Riḍā
- 996–1006 AH / 1587–1598 CE: Siege of Mashhad by the Uzbeks and concealment of Qurʾānic codices
- C. 1250 AH / 1834 CE: Restoration of the first part of the codex (MS 18)
- 1348 SH / 1970 CE: Discovery of hidden Qurʾānic leaves in the mausoleum walls (including MS 4116)
- 1390 SH / 2011 CE: Repairs to the second part of the codex (MS 4116)
- 1393–1395 SH / 2014–2016 CE: Discovery of Codex Mashhad’s significance
- 1395–1400 SH / 2016–2021 CE: Scrutiny of the full contents of MSs 18 and 4116
- 1401–1402 SH / 2022–2023 CE: Publication of the facsimile edition

== Codicology ==
=== Description ===
Codex Mashhad consists of two Qurʾānic manuscripts, numbered 18 and 4116, housed in the Āstān-i Quds-i Rażavī Library of Mashhad, Iran. It represents one of the most important primary sources for studying the historical development of the Qurʾānic text from the early Islamic period. With over 252 pages discovered so far, it contains over 90% of the Qurʾānic text, Few other early ḥijāzī-style manuscripts exhibit the combination of features found in this codex. Based on textual, orthographic and variant analyses, as well as its sūras sequence, the main body is believed to be copied in a very early period, i.e. within the first Islamic century.

While its textual transmission adheres to the official ʿUthmānic standard of the Qurʾān, the remarkable feature of this codex was its initial preservation of Ibn Masʿūd’s distinctive sūras progression – a rare survivor showcasing an alternative early organizational structure. At some point in later centuries, the sequence was rearranged to conform to the ʿUthmānic norm.

MS 18 contains the first half of the Qurʾān, from the beginning to the end of Sūrat al-Kahf, dated after 719 CE, around 790 CE or late 8th century, Manuscript 4116 holds the second half, from the middle of Sūrat Tāhā to the end. For ease of reference across the unified codex, pages of manuscript 18 are denoted with an "A" preceding the page number, while manuscript 4116 pages are designated with prefix "B". Hence, "A12a" indicates page 12a of MS 18, and "B12b" is page 12b of MS 4116.

The pages of Codex Mashhad are oriented vertically and are relatively large. The dimensions of MS 18 are approximately 5.34 × 2.46 cm; those of MS 4116 around 30 × 40 cm. Due to damage around the edges of the parchment leaves, the remaining writing space on the pages varies between 29 × 40 cm and 27 × 39 cm. The number of lines per page is typically 22 or 23, though sometimes as few as 20 or as many as 25.

This vertical layout, line count, and relatively large size distinguish Codex Mashhad from other ancient manuscripts housed in the Āstān-i Quds Library collection. It also contrasts with manuscripts of the ḥijāzī or inclined script preserved in overseas libraries and museums.

The proportions render Codex Mashhad comparable to other folios such as ŞE 71 (41.2 × 36 cm) at the Turkish and Islamic Arts Museum in Istanbul, Is1404 (47 × 38 cm) at the Chester Beatty Library in Dublin, DAM 01-29.1 (42 × 30 cm) at the Dār al-Makhūṭāt in Ṣanʿāʾ, and Marcel3 (41 x 37 cm) at the National Library of Russia in St. Petersburg.

Both parts of Codex Mashhad have undergone repairs, with some pages supplemented using fragments from late Kufic Qurans, or recopied in naskh script or entirely modern handwriting. Excluding these later additions, the main corpus exhibits features François Déroche identifies as ḥijāzī type BIa. Its script is very similar to those found in MS Ma VI 165 at Tübingen University, MS Witzestein II 1913 at the Prussian State Library, and MS Arabe 331 at the Bibliothèque nationale de France.

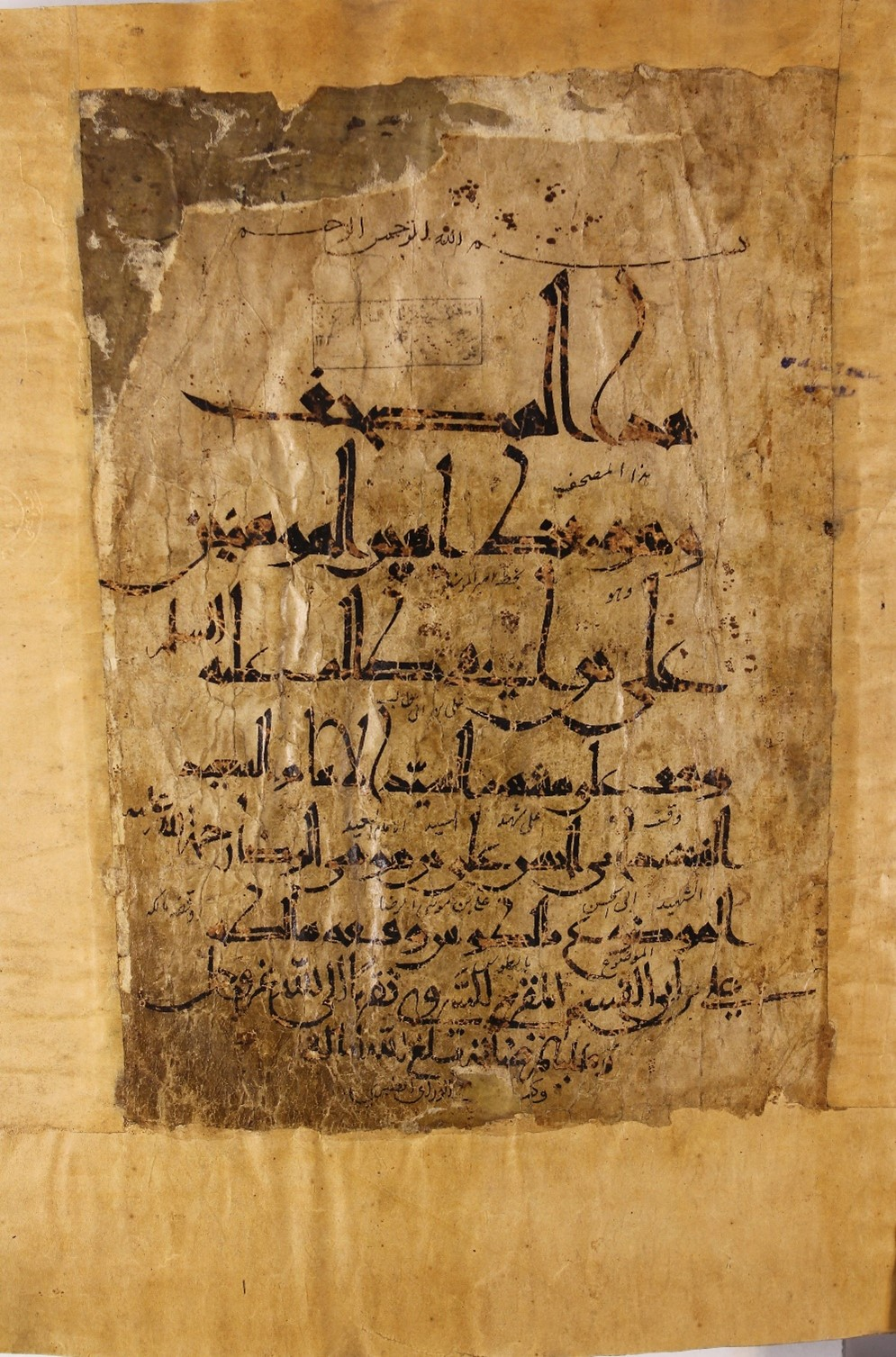
From the waqf deed at the beginning of MS 18, repeated at the end of Sūrat al-Kahf in the donor’s handwriting, it is understood that this work was endowed in two separate volumes to the Shrine of Imām al-Riḍā in the late 5th or early 6th century AH.

=== Endowment ===
Codex Mashhad was endowed to the Shrine of Imām al-Riḍā in the late 5th century AH (11th AD). It has been housed within the sanctuary ever since. Its donor was ʿAlī ibn Abī l-Qāsim al-Muqrī al-Sarawī, as documented by a deed of endowment found on the first folio (A1a) of MS 18. The deed, signed by al-Muqrī al-Sarawī as owner of the codex at that time, states:

This muṣḥaf, which is in handwriting of Amīr al-Muʾminīn ʿAlī b. Abī Ṭālib, peace be upon him, is endowed upon the Shrine of the noble Imam, the blessed martyr, Abu al-Ḥasan ʿAlī b. Mūsā al-Riḍā, may God’s mercy be upon him, who is buried in Ṭūs. This endowment is made by the owner, ʿAlī b. Abi al-Qāsim al-Muqriʾ al-Sarawī, seeking closeness to the Almighty God and His satisfaction. May God fulfill his wishes.

=== Orthography ===
The orthographic rules in Codex Mashhad tend towards archaic or defective script, indicating its palaeographic antiquity. The most salient feature is the omission of alif as the sign of long vowel /ā/, with numerous examples throughout the text.

=== Variants ===
Like all early manuscripts, Codex Mashhad simultaneously contains multiple qirāʾāt (reading variants), with no sole reading observed regularly. However, the seven reading variants attributed to the Seven Readers, which have been prevalent since the 4th century AH (10th CE), are only rarely evident in the Qurʾānic manuscripts of the first two Islamic centuries. In the earliest manuscripts, variations either indicate distinctions between regional traditions (Mecca, Medina, Kufa, Basra, Damascus), or differences in lettering and dotting not necessarily adhering to a specific renowned reader yet traceable to the readings of one of the Prophet’s Companions or Followers.

=== Sequence of sūras ===
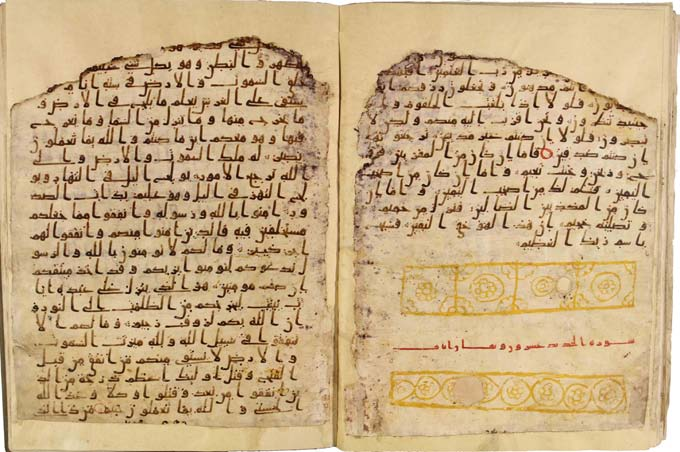
As the official presentations of the Qur’ānic text came to follow the ʿUthmānic version throughout the Islamic world in subsequent centuries, the arrangement of sūras in Codex Mashhad was reconstructed to align with the canonical sequence.

The original arrangement of sūras in Codex Mashhad diverges from the Uthmānic order, following instead the sequence attributed to Ibn Masʿūd. This provides insight into early Qurʾānic organization and transmission.

=== Titles of sūras ===
The manuscript exhibits titles for the sūras that do not fully align with traditional Islamic nomenclature, suggesting regional naming conventions or later additions.

=== Dating ===
Paleography revealed orthographic peculiarities in this codex could not have been common in the mid-second century AH or later, with some spelling variants only attested in the first century.

For radiocarbon dating, samples were taken on January 21, 2020, from manuscripts 18 and 4116 and sent to various laboratories for analysis. A total of eight tests were performed at the University of Arizona laboratory (and again in Georgia), the ETH Zürich laboratory in Switzerland, and the ORAU Oxford laboratory – an unprecedented number of tests for any Qurʾānic manuscript.

The overall findings from the above tests indicated that the folios of Codex Mashhad likely date to the late first century AH and early second century AH, with a margin of two standard deviations (2σ). From the results of paleographic and orthographic study, it is concluded that it belongs to the late first century AH.

== Facsimile edition ==
The facsimile edition of Codex Mashhad was published in 2022–2023, providing high-quality reproductions of the original manuscripts along with extensive annotations and scholarly insights. The publication aims to facilitate wider access to this document.

== Positive reception ==
The publication and detailed study of Codex Mashhad have been met with acclaim from Quranic studies scholars worldwide. Many experts in the field have praised the meticulous research and the importance of this manuscript for understanding the early history of the Quran's transmission.

Grand Ayatollah Ali al-Sistani received a presentation on the Codex Mashhad on December 5, 2023. According to reports, he praised the efforts to preserve and study such manuscripts, particularly those attributed to the Shia Imams, and expressed hope that this work would continue.

Michael Cook, a scholar of Islamic history at Princeton University, commended the work done on Codex Mashhad, stating that it "is a key exhibit in the little-known history of the relationship between the standard text and those it replaced".

Similarly, François Déroche, a French expert in Islamic codicology, highlighted the importance of Codex Mashhad, noting that "Dr Karimi-Nia’s edition enriches our knowledge of the transmission of the text of the Qurʾān and, more generally, of its history. In addition, the state of the manuscript, with more than 95% of the text, is a new argument for demonstrating that the text of the Qurʾān was well constituted at a very early date."

Nicolai Sinai, a German professor of Islamic Studies at Oxford University, called the publication of Codex Mashhad "a pioneering feat of multi-pronged manuscript scholarship." He further added that a "user of this exquisitely produced edition will feel like being given unfettered first-hand access to an ancient Qur’anic manuscript while gazing through a sophisticated pair of digital glasses supplementing the scribal artifact by various layers of supplementary information and scholarly analysis."

Eléonore Cellard (fellow in Arabic palaeography and codicology at the Collège de France) noted on her X account that Karimi-Nia's "work is one of the most brilliant contributions to the study of Qur'an manuscripts in recent years," elaborating on the unique features found in Codex Mashhad.
