= Hudhayfah ibn al-Yaman =

Sahabah of Muhammad (d. 656)

Hudhayfah ibn al-Yaman حُذَيْفَةَ بْنَ الْيَمَانِ

Governor of Al-Mada'in
- In office 642–656
- Caliphs: Umar; Uthman; Ali
- Preceded by: Salmān al-Fārisī
- Succeeded by: Sa'd ibn Mas'ud al-Thaqafi

Personal details
- Born: Mecca, Hejaz, Arabia
- Died: c. 656 AD Al-Mada'in, Iraq
- Relations: Banu Abs (clan)
- Parent(s): Al-Yaman ibn Hasal (father); Al-Rabab bint Kaab Al-Ashhaliya (mother)
- Known for: companion of Muhammad

Military service
- Allegiance: Muhammad (623–632); Rashidun Caliphate (632–656)
- Battles/wars: Under Muhammad; Battle of Uhud; Battle of the Trench; Early Muslim conquests; Muslim conquest of Persia; Battle of Nahavand; Muslim conquest of Iraq; Battle of Burs; Battle of Babylon; Siege of Ctesiphon

Hudhayfah ibn al-Yaman (Arabic: حُذَيْفَةَ بْنَ الْيَمَانِ, romanized: Ḥudhayfah ibn al-Yamān; died 656) was a prominent companion (Sahabah) of the Islamic prophet Muhammad and a central military and political figure in the early Rashidun Caliphate. He is widely celebrated in Islamic tradition as the "Keeper of the Secret" (Sahib al-Sirr), a title earned after Muhammad entrusted him with the identities of the hypocrites (Munafiq) in Medina. Hudhayfah was tasked with monitoring the activities of these individuals, who posed a significant internal threat to the community. He remained faithful to his pledge of secrecy throughout his life.

Hudhayfah distinguished himself as an intelligence officer at the Battle of the Trench and later as a general during the Muslim conquest of Persia, most notably taking command at the Battle of Nahavand (642). He served as the governor of Kufa and Al-Mada'in, where he was recognized for his ascetic leadership. Beyond his military role, Hudhayfah was a catalyst for the standardization of the Quran after reporting regional variations in recitation to Caliph Uthman. He died in 656, shortly after the Assassination of Uthman, leaving a significant legacy in Hadith scholarship regarding internal faith and political strife.

== Early life ==
Hudhayfah participated in the Battle of Uhud (625) alongside his father, al-Yaman. Due to their advanced age, al-Yaman and his friend Thabit ibn Waqsh had initially been left with the non-combatants. However, as the fighting intensified, both decided to join the engagement. In the ensuing chaos, Thabit was killed by the Meccan forces, while al-Yaman was killed by friendly fire from Muslim soldiers who failed to recognize him.

During the incident, Hudhayfah reportedly cried out, "My father! My father! It's my father!" but the soldiers did not hear him in the heat of battle. Despite his grief, Hudhayfah immediately pardoned those responsible, stating: No one heard him and al-Yaman was killed in error. Grieved as he was, Hudhayfah told his fathers killers:

"May God forgive you for He is the Most Merciful of those who show mercy."

Muhammad later intended to pay the diyyah (blood money) for the killing, but Hudhayfah declined the compensation, donating it instead to the Muslim community.

== Confidant of Muhammad ==
Hudhayfah was noted for his intelligence, quick-wittedness, and discretion. Because of his ability to maintain secrecy, Muhammad entrusted him with the names of the twelve hypocrites. These were individuals who outwardly professed Islam while secretly undermining the Muslim community. This trust was unique to Hudhayfah, earning him the title Sahib al-Sirr (the Keeper of the Secret of the Messenger of Allah). Hudhayfah was tasked with monitoring the activities of these individuals, who posed a significant internal threat to the community. He remained faithful to his pledge of secrecy throughout his life.

Following Muhammad's death, the Caliphs occasionally sought his advice regarding these figures, but he refused to disclose their names. During his caliphate, Umar attempted to identify the hypocrites indirectly by observing Hudhayfah’s attendance at funeral prayers. If Hudhayfah abstained from a funeral, Umar would also refrain from performing the prayer. On one occasion, Umar asked Hudhayfah if any of his provincial governors was a hypocrite. Hudhayfah confirmed that one was, but declined to name him. Hudhayfah later noted that Umar dismissed the individual shortly afterward, seemingly having identified him through his own judgment.

== Military and administrative career ==
=== Under Muhammad ===
Hudhayfah participated in all military engagements of the early Muslim community except the Battle of Badr. During the Battle of the Trench (627), his unique qualities were utilized for intelligence gathering. As the Quraysh and their allies laid siege to Medina, they were beset by a violent windstorm that overturned their tents and extinguished their fires. Muhammad commissioned Hudhayfah to infiltrate the enemy camp under cover of darkness to assess their morale. Hudhayfah successfully penetrated the camp of Abu Sufyan, observing the disintegration of the enemy coalition and the decision of the Meccan leadership to withdraw. This intelligence allowed the Muslim forces to anticipate the end of the siege:

=== Conquest of Persia and governorship ===
The Sawad of Iraq

Under the caliphate of Umar ibn al-Khattab, Hudhayfah emerged as a prominent military commander during the Muslim conquest of Persia, distinguishing himself in the captures of Hamadan, Rayy, and Dinavar. He played a pivotal role in the Battle of Nahavand (642), often termed the "Victory of Victories." When the initial commander, al-Nu'man ibn Muqrin, fell in battle, Hudhayfah immediately assumed command. To maintain the army's morale, he instructed that the death of the commander remain a secret until victory was secured. Under his leadership, the Muslim forces achieved a decisive victory against the Sasanian Empire. Following this, he participated in the advance into Armenia, leading a column into the Al-Lan mountains in 644. Following the decisive victory at the Battle of Nahavand in 21 AH (642 AD), Caliph Umar appointed Hudhayfah as the administrator of the lands watered by the Tigris and beyond. Establishing his seat in the former Sasanian capital of Al-Mada'in (Ctesiphon), he replaced the previous military administration with a civil structure focused on the Sawad agricultural regions. His arrival in Ctesiphon was noted for its austerity; he reportedly entered the city on a donkey while eating a simple loaf of bread, in stark contrast to the opulence of previous Persian rulers. As governor, he warned the populace against "places of intrigue" (fitnah), which he defined as the doors of rulers where individuals might use falsehoods to gain favor with authorities

== Role in the compilation of the Quran ==
During the caliphate of Uthman ibn Affan, Hudhayfah played a decisive role in the preservation of the Quran following his experiences during the military campaigns in Armenia and Azerbaijan. While serving alongside Muslim soldiers from both Iraq and the Levant, he observed alarming discrepancies in the recitation of the holy text as different regions had become accustomed to specific local dialects. These variations led to heated disputes where soldiers accused one another of misguidance or even blasphemy. Recognizing that this regional friction posed a threat to the unity of the Muslim community, Hudhayfah immediately traveled to Medina to alert the Caliph. He famously urged Uthman to save the nation before they differed over their Book in the same manner as the Jews and the Christians.

Uthman concurred with Hudhayfah’s assessment and initiated the compilation of the Uthmanic codex to maintain the integrity of the revelation. Following Hudhayfah's warning, the Caliph requested the original manuscripts kept in the custody of Hafsa bint Umar and formed a committee to produce authoritative copies based on the dialect of the Quraysh. This project standardized the text and replaced various personal manuscripts that had begun to circulate across the growing empire. Hudhayfah is historically credited as the catalyst for this monumental task, having foreseen the danger of linguistic drift and secured the textual unity of the Quran for future generations.

== Role in the Kufan revolt ==
During the later years of Uthman's reign, Hudhayfah became increasingly involved in the political developments of Kufa. Around 654–655, a major revolt broke out against the governor Sa'id ibn al-As. After the rebel leader Malik al-Ashtar seized control of the city, he appointed Hudhayfah to take charge of the sawad (productive agricultural lands) and the administration of the land tax. Although Uthman was reportedly under duress, he eventually confirmed Hudhayfah’s appointment to appease the Kufan dissidents.

Hudhayfah's political alignment during this period was complex. While he worked within the rebel-led administration, he was also reported by Al-Ya'qubi to have attended the funeral of the dissident companion Abu Dharr al-Ghifari.

He maintained a nuanced stance regarding the Assassination of Uthman, famously saying:

"O Allah, if the killing of Uthman was good, I have no part in it. If his killing was evil, then I am innocent of it. By Allah, if his killing had been good, milk will come from it. If his killing was evil, then there will be blood on account of it."

This caution reflected the broader anxiety among the Sahaba regarding the onset of the First Fitna. Despite this public neutrality, traditional reports indicate that shortly before his death in 656, he instructed his sons to pledge allegiance to Ali ibn Abi Talib.

== Death ==
He died in Al-Madain in Iraq, in the year 36 Hijri, 40 days after the death of Uthman. Before his death, he asked for 2 shrouds to be prepared.

== Legacy and Hadith scholarship ==
Hudhayfah Ibn Al-Yaman felt the sources of good in life were easily recognizable for those desiring good but evil was deceptive and often difficult to perceive. He warned people to struggle against evil with their heart, hands and tongue. Those who stood against evil only with their hearts and tongues, and not hands, he considered as having abandoned a part of truth. Those who hated evil only in their hearts but did not combat it with their tongues and hands forsook two parts of truth and those who neither detested nor confronted evil with their hearts, tongues or hands he considered as physically alive but morally dead.

Speaking about the heart, he once said: "There are four kinds of hearts. The heart that is encased or atrophied. That is the heart of the kafir or ungrateful disbeliever. The heart that is shaped into thin layers. That is the heart of the munafiq or hypocrite. The heart that is open and bare and on which shines a radiant light. That is the heart of the mumin or the believer. Finally there is the heart in which there is both hypocrisy and faith. Faith is like a tree which thrives with good water and hypocrisy is like an abscess which thrives on pus and blood. Whichever flourishes more, be it the tree of faith or the abscess of hypocrisy, wins control of the heart."

Hudhayfah's experience with hypocrisy and his efforts to combat it gave a touch of sharpness and severity to his tongue. He himself realized this and admitted it with a noble courage: "I went to [Muhammad] and said: 'O Messenger of God, I have a tongue which is sharp and cutting against my family and I fear that this would lead me to hell.' And [Muhammad], said to me: 'Where do you stand with regard to istighfar - asking forgiveness from Allah? I ask Allah for forgiveness a hundred times during the day. "

== See also ==
- Sunni view of the Sahaba

== Bibliography ==
- Madelung, Wilferd (1997). The Succession to Muhammad: A Study of the Early Caliphate. Cambridge University Press. ISBN 0-521-64696-0.
- Ibn Sa'd, Muhammad (2013). Kitab at-Tabaqat al-Kabir, Volume III: The Companions of Badr. Translated by Aisha Bewley. London: Ta-Ha Publishers. ISBN 978-1842001332.
- Al-Bukhari, Muhammad. "Sahih al-Bukhari, Hadith 4987: Virtues of the Qur'an". Sunnah.com.
- al-Aʻzamī, Muḥammad Muṣṭafá (2003). The History of the Qur'ānic Text: From Revelation to Compilation: A Comparative Study with the Old and New Testaments. UK Islamic Academy. ISBN 9781872531663.
- Tabatabai, Sayyid M. H. (1987). The Qur'an in Islam - its impact and influence on the life of Muslims. Zahra Publ. ISBN 9780710302656.
- Zakeri, Mohsen (1995). Sasanid Soldiers in Early Muslim Society: The Origins of 'Ayyārān and Futuwwa. Harrassowitz Verlag. ISBN 9783447036528.
- Smith, G. Rex, ed. (1994). The History of al-Ṭabarī, Volume XIV: The Conquest of Iran, A.D. 641–643/A.H. 21–23. SUNY Series in Near Eastern Studies. Albany, New York: State University of New York Press. ISBN 978-0-7914-1293-0.
