= Mushaf =

Written copy of Quran

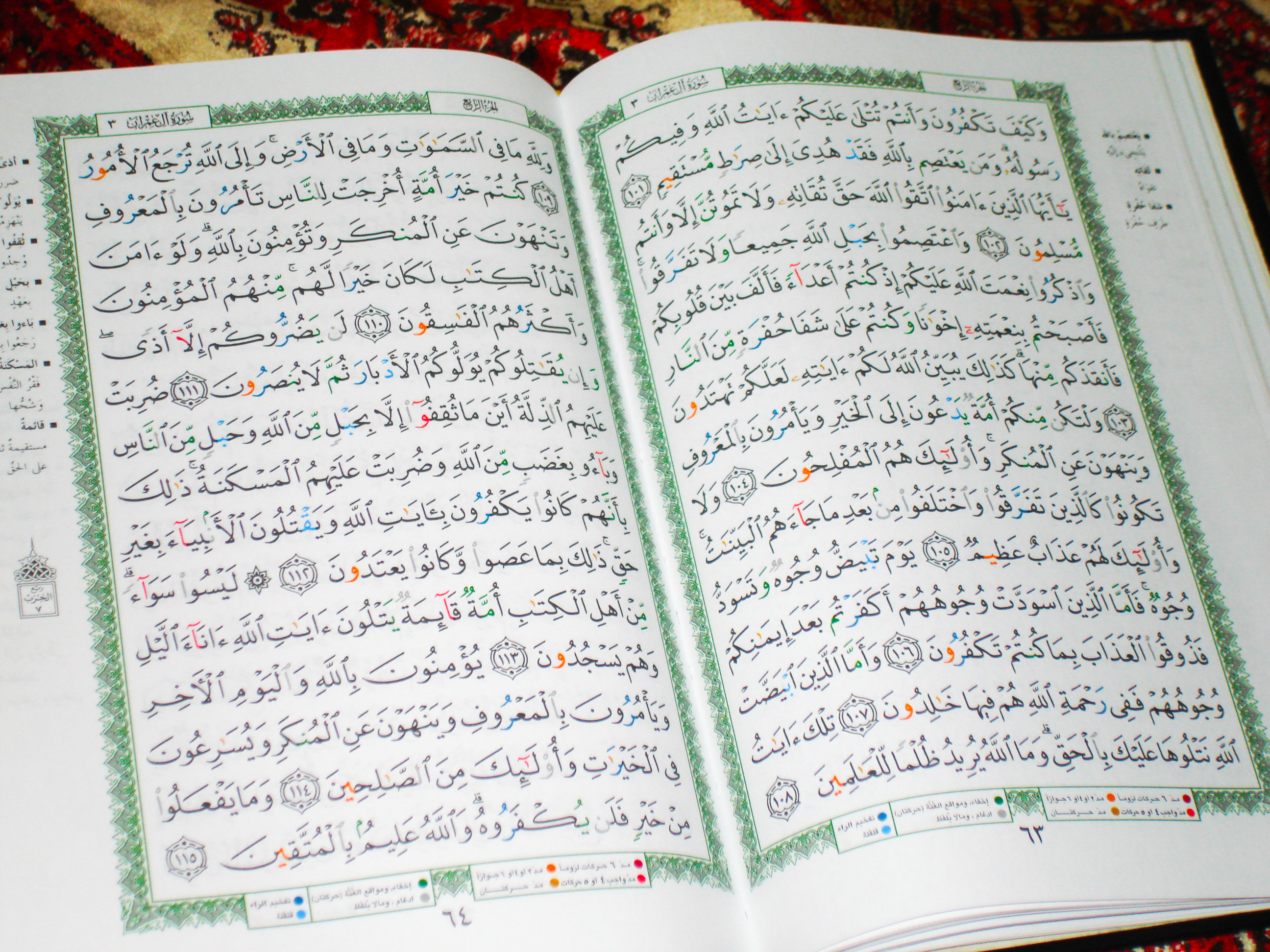
Mushaf al-Tajwid, printed with colored letters to facilitate reading the Quran with tajwid.

Muṣḥaf (Arabic: مُصْحَف, pronounced [ˈmʊsˤ.ħæf]; plural مَصَاحِف, maṣāḥif, [mɑˈsˤɑːħɪf]) is an Arabic word for a codex or collection of sheets, but also refers to a written copy of the Quran. The chapters of the Quran, which Muslims believe was revealed during a 23-year period in Muhammad's lifetime, were written on various pieces of writing material during Muhammad's era. Two decades later, these pieces were assembled into one volume under the third caliph, Uthman ibn Affan, and this collection has formed the basis of all written copies of the Quran to the present day.

In Arabic, al-Qur’ān means 'the Recitation', and Islam states that it was recited orally by Muhammad after receiving it via the angel Gabriel. The word muṣḥaf is meant to distinguish between Muhammad's recitations and the physical, written Quran. This term does not appear in the Quran itself, though it does refer to itself as a kitāb (كِتَابٌ), or book or writings, from yaktubu (يَكْتُبُ) or to write, in many verses.

Some Islamic scholars also use the term muṣḥaf to refer to all the revelations contained within the book itself, while using al-Qur’ān to refer to all verses revealed to Muhammad during his lifetime, including those abrogated and removed from the muṣḥaf prior to its final written form, as mentioned in some hadith. For this reason, these scholars say that there is only one possible version of the Quran, but multiple possible versions of the muṣḥaf.

== See also ==
- Digital Quran
- Mushaf of Ali
- Ibn Mas'ud's arrangement
- Uthman's Quran
