= Uthmanic codex =

The Quran collected by Uthman Ibn Affan

The Uthmanic codex —according to historical accounts— is the only edition of the Quran compiled by the third Rashidun caliph Uthman ibn Affan. He ordered it to be copied and the copies sent to Islamic countries, after the death of Muhammad. The Quran was collected in a single book by order of the first caliph Abu Bakr al-Siddiq, and when the caliphate was handed over to Uthman ibn Affan, the Islamic conquests expanded and the companions spread in the conquered countries, teaching people the Quran and how to read its different readings. When the Companion Hudhayfah ibn al-Yaman noticed that Muslims differed in reading and some of this difference was tinged with melody, he told the Caliph about it, and Uthman ordered that the Quran be collected in one way. He sent Hafsa bint Umar to allow him to use the copy of the Quran in her possession to use it as a reference, and Uthman ordered several copies of the Quran to unify the reading and ordered them to be distributed to the Muslim countries, and ordered the destruction of anything that contradicts that Quran.

Uthman ibn Affan formed a committee in tradition to write the Quran: Zayd ibn Thabit, Abd Allah ibn al-Zubayr, Sa'id ibn al-'As, and 'Abd al-Rahman ibn al-Harith ibn Hisham, then he gave Zayd ibn Thabit and the three Qurayshis the Quran that had been with Hafsa bint 'Umar, and he ordered them to copy the Quran from it, and he said: "If you and Zayd ibn Thabit disagree on something in the Quran, write it in the Quraysh tongue, for it was revealed in their tongue." The collection and copying of the Quran began in late 24 AH and early 25 AH, and historians have not dated how long it took the committee to write the Quran.

Uthman's Quran preserved for Muslims the order of the surahs and verses as they are now. Here, the history of the Quran is based on a number of narrations that were recorded in later periods.

== Historical background ==
=== Collecting the Quran during Muhammad's era ===
Muhammad had taken several revelation writers, namely: The Four Rashidun Caliphs, Zayd ibn Thabit, Ubayy ibn Ka'b, Muadh ibn Jabal, Mu'awiya ibn Abi Sufyan, and other companions. If he received a revelation, he ordered one of them to write it down. They did not have writing tools at that time, so they wrote on aspen, thin stones, and wood. Uthman ibn Affan narrated that when Muhammad received something from the Quran, he would call some of those who used to write it down and say: "Put this in the Surah in which such and such is mentioned." One of the most important things that characterized the collection of the Quran during Muhammad's reign was that it was written by the Ahruf, and that it was arranged in order of verses, while the surahs were arranged differently. It was not compiled in a single book, but was dispersed in scrolls and bones, in which Zayd ibn Thabit says: "The Prophet died and the Quran was not compiled into anything."

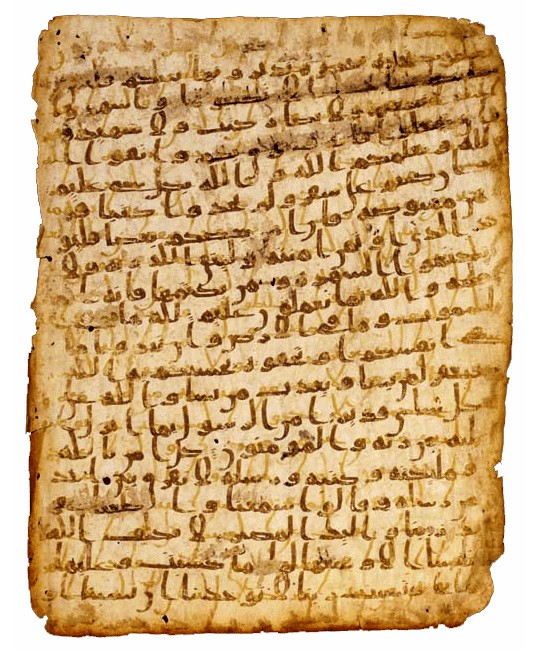
A model of the parchment paper on which the Quran was written in the early Hijri centuries.

=== Collecting the Quran during Abu Bakr's reign ===
Muhammad died with the Quran not compiled into a single written Quran, but scattered in verbal memories, tablets, and other means of writing. After Abu Bakr al-Siddiq assumed the caliphate, there were a number of reasons and motivations that prompted the Companions to collect the Quran in scrolls. One of the most important reasons was the Battle of al-Yamama, in which a large number of Companions were killed, including a large number of readers by memory. This prompted Umar ibn al-Khattab to go to Abu Bakr and ask him to speed up the collection and codification of the Quran so that it would not disappear with the death of its preservers. This is what Abu Bakr al-Siddiq did after initially hesitating to do something that Muhammad did not do.

The narrations indicate that the first of the companions who ordered the collection of the Quran was Abu Bakr al-Siddiq on the advice of Umar ibn al-Khattab and that the person who carried out the collection was Zayd ibn Thabit. Al-Bukhari narrated from Zayd that he said: "Abu Bakr got the news of the killing of the people of Yamama, and Umar was there. So Abu Bakr said: 'Umar came to me and said that on the day of Yamama, the killing of the people had become rampant, and I am afraid that the killing of the readers will become rampant, and a lot of the Quran will be lost unless you collect it, and I think you should collect the Quran'. So Abu Bakr said: ' How can I do something that the Prophet himself didn't do!'. Umar said: 'I swear by Allah, it is good'. While Umar kept discussing it with me until Allah clarified the matter to me, and I saw what Umar saw. Zayd said: 'Umar is sitting there, not speaking'. Abu Bakr said: 'You are a young and wise man, you used to write revelations for Muhammad, so track down the Quran and collect it'. I swear by Allah, that if he had asked me to move a mountain, it would not have been heavier than what he ordered me to do about collecting the Quran. So I said: 'How you want to do something that the prophet didn't do!'. Abu Bakr said, 'By Allah, it is good', and I kept discussing it with him until Allah cleared my chest to what Allah cleared the chest of Abu Bakr and Umar to. So I got up and tracked down the Quran, collecting it from the sheets, scrolls, and the memories of men. The papers in which the Quran was collected were with Abu Bakr until his death, then with Umar until his death, then with Hafsa bint Umar."

Before Abu Bakr al-Siddiq gathered the Quran, the companions had books in which they wrote the Quran or some of it, but these books were individual efforts that did not receive the precision of research and investigation that the Quran of Abu Bakr al-Siddiq received. Zayd then proceeded to collect the Quran and was supervised and assisted by Abu Bakr, Umar, and other Companions. Urwa ibn al-Zubayr narrated: "When the readers were killed on that day, Abu Bakr feared that the Quran would be lost, so he said to Umar ibn al-Khattab and Zayd ibn Thabit: Sit at the door of the mosque and whoever comes to you with two witnesses to something from the Book of Allah, write it down."

Al-Bukhari and Al-Tirmidhi reported that Abu Bakr al-Siddiq paired Zayd ibn Thabit with three others from Quraysh, who were: Sa'id ibn Abi al-'As, Abd al-Rahman ibn al-Harith and Abdullah ibn al-Zubayr. When they collected the Quran. Abu Bakr took it and had it until he died, then Umar had it until he died, then Hafsa bint Umar had it. When Uthman's caliphate came, people differed in reading. Al-Suyuti said: "Abu Bakr al-Siddiq was the first to compile the Quran in a book."

== Origin of the codex ==
=== Motivation ===
Caliph Uthman ibn Affan's compilation of the Quran was the second compilation during the reign of the Rashidun caliphs. When the Islamic conquests expanded, the Companions spread out in the conquered countries, teaching the Quran and the religious sciences to the people. Each Companion taught his students the way he had received it. In Iraq, the codex of Ibn Mas'ud was already popular whereas in the Levant, the codex of Ubayy ibn Ka'b was already popular. Ibn al-Jazari narrated: "We are certain that many of the companions were reading what was contrary to the Uthman's Quran before the consensus on the Quran. By adding one or more words, replacing one word with another, and omitting some words, as proven in the two Sahihs and others. And now we forbidding people from reciting it in prayer.

When the Muslim army set out to conquer Armenia and Azerbaijan, the soldiers were from Iraq and the Levant and there was a lot of discord and conflict between them. Hudhayfah ibn al-Yaman saw that they differed in reading and some of it was tinged with melody with each of them familiar with his reading, accustomed to it and believing it to be the correct one and all others are misguided, even blaspheming each other. This frightened Hudhayfah and he said, "By God, I will ride to the Caliph". Uthman had seen a similar situation in Medina, where a teacher would teach a reading and another teacher would teach another reading, so the boys would meet and some of them would deny the other's reading and he said: "I have you who differ in it, and you read it with tune, and those who are further away from me are more different and more melodic. Gather together, companions of Muhammad, and choose a direction for the people". When Huzaifa came to Uthman and told him what had happened, Uthman's expectations were realized. Al-Bukhari narrated on the authority of Anas bin Malik that he said: "Hudhayfah bin al-Yaman came to Uthman and was conquering Armenia and Azerbaijan with the people of Iraq, Hudhayfah was dismayed by their difference in reading. He said to Uthman: 'Save this nation before they differ in the Book by the difference between the Jews and Christians'. Uthman sent a message to Hafsa saying "send us the manuscripts of the Qur'an so that we may compile the Qur'anic materials in perfect copies and return the manuscripts to you". So Hafsa sent it to Uthman".

Ibn Atiyyah al-Andalusi mentioned that the books collected during the reign of Abu Bakr remained with him, then with Umar ibn al-Khattab after him, and then with Hafsa, his daughter, during the caliphate of Uthman. In the meantime, books written about the companions spread across the horizon, such as Abdullah ibn Masud's Quran, the Sham Quran, Ubayy ibn Ka'b's Quran, and so on. When Hudhayfah returned from the Armenian invasion, Uthman was deputized to compile the Quran according to the seven letters of the Quran.

=== Collection ===
When Uthman ibn Affan heard what he heard and what Hudhayfah ibn al-Yaman told him, he consulted the companions about what to do. Ibn Hajar al-Asqalani narrated that Ali ibn Abi Talib said: "O people, do not exaggerate about Uthman and do not say anything but good things about him and his Quran, I swear By Allah, he did not do what he did with the Quran except on the knowledge of all of us.” He said: “What do you say about this reading, I was informed that some of them say that my reading is better than yours, and this is almost blasphemy.” We said: “What do you think ?” He said: “I think that we should gather the people on one Quran so that there will be no division and no disagreement.” We said: “Yes, we agree.” Ali said: “By Allah if I were in charge, I would have done what he did.” Uthman chose four people for the task of copying the Quran: Zayd ibn Thabit, Abdullah ibn al-Zubayr, Sa'id ibn al-As, and Abd al-Rahman ibn al-Harith ibn Hisham. Uthman asked the Companions: “Who is the best writer among the people?” They said: “The writer of Muhammad, Zayd bin Thabit”. He said: “Which of the people is good in pronunciation?” They said: “Sa'id bin Al-Aas”. Uthman said: “Let Sa'id dictate and let Zayd write”. It is said that Uthman chose twelve men from the Quraysh and Ansar, including Ubayy ibn Ka'b, Zayd ibn Thabit, and others. There is no contradiction between the two accounts, and what is known is that the Quran writing committee was four. It appears that Uthman ibn Affan was not satisfied with these four, but included in their assistance those who had knowledge of the Qur'an to help them in writing it.

After Uthman agreed with the Companions to collect the Quran in one letter, he followed this method of collecting the Quran:

- Uthman addressed the people and said: "O people, your covenant with your Prophet was thirteen years ago, and you are disputing the Quran, saying that my father's reading and Abdullah's reading. So I ask each one of you who memorized something from the Quran to step forward.” So a lot came, then Uthman entered and called them man by man and asked them, "Did you hear Muhammad dictate it to you?” And he says: "Yes". When he finished he asked: “Who is the best writer among the people?” They said: “The writer of Muhammad, Zayd bin Thabit”. He said: Which of the people good in pronunciation? They said: Sa'id bin Al-Aas. Uthman said: Let Sa'id dictate and let Zayd write. He wrote Zayd. He wrote copies of the Quran and dispersed them in the people. I heard some of Muhammad's companions say: "He has done well"
- Uthman sent to Hafsa bint Umar, "Send us the books, we will copy them into the Quran and then return them to you." She sent them to him, which is the Quran that was collected during the reign of Abu Bakr al-Siddiq.
- Uthman gave Zayd ibn Thabit and the three Qurayshis the Quran that Hafsa had, and ordered them to copy Qurans from it. Uthman said to the three Qurayshis: "If you and Zayd ibn Thabit disagree on something from the Quran, write it down in the Quraysh tongue, for it was revealed in their tongue."
- If a verse has more than one reading, the verse is written without any sign that restricts its pronunciation to one reading, and It should be written in a single drawing that includes both readings or all of the readings.

After the Qurans were copied, Uthman sent copies of them to Muslim countries. Muslims were active in copying Qurans for individuals, and Zayd ibn Thabit in Medina used to devote himself in Ramadan every year to displaying Qurans, and people would show their Qurans to him with the Quran of the people of Madina in front of him.

=== Features ===
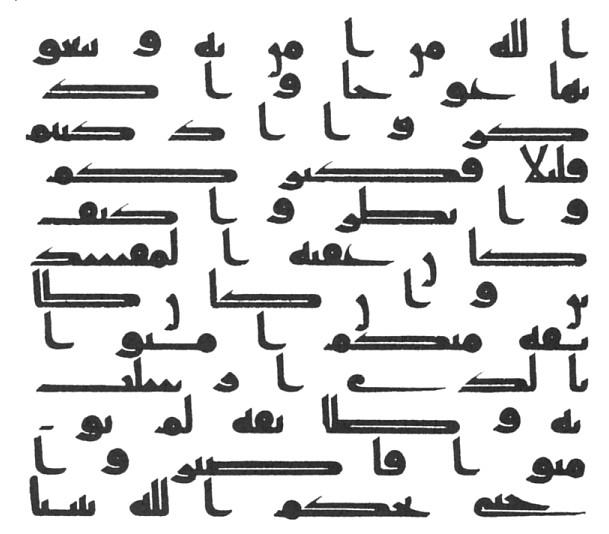
An example from the Sanaa manuscripts of what the Uthman's Quran used to look like, as it is free of dots and diacritical marks.

Uthman's Quran was characterized by several features:

- Limited to one of the seven Ahruf, Ibn al-Qayyim said: "Uthman gathered the people on one of the seven Ahruf that the prophet Muhammad allowed them to read with and that was for the general best interest." The motivation in retaining only one of Muhammad's ahruf was said to be to engender a greater unity around the Quran.
- Disregarding what has been recited. Uthman ibn Affan intended to gather people into a Quran in which there is no advancement, delay, or interpretation. Nor was it written with its recitation abrogated, and it is obligatory to read and memorize it, for fear of introducing corruption and suspicion to those who come after them.
- Limited to what was proven in the last presentation and discarding everything else. Abu Bakr ibn Abi Dawud narrated in the Book of Al-Masahef from the hadith of Muhammad ibn Sirin about Kathir ibn Mufleh: "When Uthman wanted to write the Quran, he gathered twelve men from Quraysh and Ansar, including Abai bin Ka'b, and Zayd ibn Thabit said that they were sent to the quarters in Umar's house. He said Uthman used to watch over them, so if they argued about something, they delayed it. Muhammad said: I said to Kathir and he was among those who were writing, Do you know why they delayed it, he said no. Muhammad said: I thought that they delayed it in order to see who was most recent to hear it, so they would write it down according to what he said."
- The verses and suras are arranged in the way we know them now. Al-Hakim al-Nishapuri said: "The collection of the Quran was not a one-time event, some of it was collected in the presence of the Prophet, then some collected in the presence of Abu Bakr al-Siddiq, and the third collection is the order of the suras, which was during the caliphate of Uthman ibn Affan".

=== Distribution to regional centers ===
After the committee completed copying the Quran, Uthman ibn Affan sent copies to the Muslim world. He sent with each Quran those who know its reading. He ordered Zayd ibn Thabit to read the Madani Quran reading and sent Abdullah ibn al-Sa'eb with the Meccan Quran reading, Mughira ibn Abi Shihab with the Levantine Quran reading, and Abu Abdulrahman al-Sulami with the Kufic Quran reading, and Amer ibn Abdul Qais with Basra Quran reading. Muslims in every country of Islam received the reading of their imam, and some of them devoted themselves to fine-tuning the readings until they became imams to whom people turned to. This is how these Qurans spread because the reliance on the transmission of the Quran is based on receiving it from the memory of men, trustworthy by trustworthy, and imam by imam, to Muhammad. Uthman chose trusted custodians and sent them to the Islamic countries and considered these Qurans as second originals. In order to document the Quran and unite Muslims, he sent to each region his Quran with those who agreed with its reading for the most part.

=== Reception among companions ===
After Uthman ibn Affan finished the Quran, he ordered everything except his Quran to be burned. And he sent to everyone "I have done such and such and erased what I have, so erase what you have". The Companions accepted what Uthman did and agreed that it was correct. Zayd ibn Thabit said: "I saw the companions of Muhammad saying: "By God, Uthman is good, Uthman is good." Abu Bakr ibn Abi Dawud narrated from Mus'ab ibn Sa'd: "I realized the people were present when Uthman burned the Quran and they liked it. He said: "No one denied it". Suwayd ibn Ghafla narrated that: Ali ibn Abi Talib said: "Do not say anything but good about Uthman, I swear by Allah, he did not do what he did with the Quran except on our authority". Ibn Abi Dawud said that Ali said about the Quran: "If Uthman had not made it, I would have made it." Abdullah ibn Mas'ud is reported to have opposed the compilation effort. By one account, this was caused by the lack of his inclusion on the compilation committee. He reportedly said: "I was removed from copying the Quran and a man took over the Quran, and by Allah, I became a Muslim and he was the son of a disbeliever man." Another report collected by Abu Bakr al-Anbari defended the choice of Zayd as the head of the committee over Ibn Mas'ud. According to reports by Al-Dhahabi and Ibn Kathir, Ibn Mas'ud came to accept the Uthmanic codex.

== Number of copied Qurans ==
The number of copies that Uthman wrote has been disputed:

- It was said to be four copies: Abu Amr al-Dani said: "Most scholars agree that when Uthman ibn Affan wrote the Quran, he made it in four copies. He sent one of them to each of the districts, one to Kufa, one to Basra, and one to Levant, and he kept one for himself."
- It is said to be five copies: Al-Suyuti said: "The number of Qurans that Uthman sent to the regions has been disputed, but it is known to be five."
- It was said to be six.
- It was said to be seven copies: Ibn Abi Dawud narrated on the authority of Abu Hatim al-Sijistani who said: "When Uthman wrote and compiled the Quran, he wrote seven copies of Qurans, sending one to Mecca, one to Levant, one to Yemen, one to Bahrain, one to Basra, one to Kufa, and keeping one in Medina."
- It was said to be eight.

The majority of scholars tend to take the view that the copies of the Quran were six. There is also a consensus among ancient and modern historians that four Qurans were specialized in Medina, Damascus, Kufa, and Basra, and that there is disagreement over the Qurans of Yemen, Bahrain, Mecca, and Egypt. The copied Qurans were all written on parchment. Except for the Quran that Uthman ibn Affan himself was given, it was said that it was written on gazelle parchment. The Meccan and Medina Qurans were called Hijazi Qurans, the Kufic and Basra Qurans are the two Iraqi Qurans. The sixth one is the Levantine Quran. The origin of all these Qurans is the Imam's Quran, which was kept by Caliph Uthman ibn Affan, there is no difference between the copies sent to Islamic countries, the Imam's Quran was the first reference in the Islamic state, to which all Qurans are referred.

== Mentions of these Qurans ==
Some historians reported seeing some of these Qurans, including Ibn Jubayr (d. 614 AH), when he visited the Umayyad Mosque in Damascus and saw in the eastern corner of the modern mihrab a large cabinet containing a Quran copy of Uthman's Quran, which he had sent it to the Levant. Ibn Battuta (d. 779 AH) also visited the mosque and said: "In the front of the mosque is the Great Mosque in which the Shafi'i Imam leads the prayer, and in the eastern corner of it, opposite of the mihrab, is a large cabinet containing the Quran that was sent to the Levant by Uthman bin Affan". Ibn Kathir (d. 774 AH) saw the same copy: "As for the Uthman Qurans the most famous of them is the one in the Levant today, in the Damascus Mosque, at the eastern corner, which was formerly in Tiberias, then moved to Damascus around eighteen hundred and five, I have seen it written with fine handwriting, clear ink in parchment, which I think is made of camel skins." Ibn Battuta also reported that he saw in the Ali ibn Abi Talib Mosque in Basra the Quran that Uthman was reading when he was killed. And the effect of the blood on the paper with the saying: "Allah will suffice for them, and He is the All-Hearing and All-Knowing". Ibn al-Jazri and Shihab al-Din Ahmad ibn Fadlallah al-Amri are reported to have both seen the same Levantine Quran in the Umayyad Mosque. Ibn al-Jazari saw a Quran in Egypt.

The Levantine Quran appears to have been preserved in the Umayyad Mosque until the early 14th century when it is said that it was burned. The Syrian thinker Muhammad Kurd Ali said of the Umayyad Mosque: "Until the year 1310 AH, the fire spread to the trunks of its roofs and consumed them in less than three hours, destroying the last vestiges of the building. It burned a Quran with Kufic script that had been brought from an ancient mosque in Bosra, people used to say it was an Uthman's Quran". The Quran is said to have been in the possession of the Russian czars at the Leningrad Book House for a time and then moved to England. There are also antique Qurans held in Egypt's book and antiquities vaults, including the Quran kept in the antiquities vaults at the Husseini Mosque, they are said to be Uthman's Qurans, but Al-Azhari scholar Muhammad Abdul Azim al-Zarqani is highly skeptical of this, the reasoning was that they had decorations and inscriptions placed as markers to separate suras and to indicate the tenths of the Quran, and it is known that the Uthman's Quran was devoid of all this.

== Imam's Quran ==
It Is the Quran that was attributed to the third caliph Uthman ibn Affan. This name is given to the personal Quran of Uthman ibn Affan, which he kept for himself, and from which other copies were made and distributed in Islamic countries. Muhammad Tahir al-Kurdi says in the History of the Quran: "The Uthmanic Quran refers to the Quran of Uthman ibn Affan which he ordered to be written and collected, they used to call it the Imam Quran, and the reason for this name Imam is Uthman's saying, "O Companions of Muhammad, gather together and write for the people an Imam." Al-Suyuti says: "The number of copies that were copied from the Uthmanic Quran, which was compiled by the Caliph Uthman bin Affan to unite the nation to avoid disagreement and division in religion, the Companions unanimously agreed that it included all the books that Al-Siddiq had collected during his reign on the advice of Umar. Umar left it with his daughter Hafsa. He sent one copy to Mecca, one to the Levant, one to Yemen, one to Bahrain, one to Basra, one to Kufa, and one to Medina. The Qurans that are in the hands of people in the eastern and western parts of the world today are the result of this collection, and there is no collection after this collection, and all aspects of reading are applied to these Qurans." As far as the description of the Uthmanic Imam Quran is concerned, it is not possible to describe it accurately at present, this is because there are many different accounts about the fate of the Uthman Quran or the original Uthmanic Qurans. It is narrated that Abu Ubayd al-Qasim ibn Salam saw the Quran of Uthman, which was spilled with his blood, and saw traces of blood on the pages of the Quran. He says: "I saw the Quran of Uthman Ibn Affan in the month of Rabi' al-Awwal in the year 223 A.H. I measured the length of the Quran and found twenty-eight lines in the paper. I saw a trace of blood on many papers of the Quran, some as much as half a paper, some as much as a third, and I saw the blood itself in Surat al-Najm." The author of Samir al-Talibin states: "The Uthmanic Qurans were written in the order written in the Preserved Tablets by Gabriel, informing Muhammad of this and informing him when each verse was revealed in its place, devoid of dots and shapes. What the masses of the Salaf believe is that it includes all the seven Ahruf of the Quran, including the last presentation that Muhammad showed to Gabriel and did not leave any of them out."

=== Uthman's personal Quran ===
It is important to distinguish between the Qurans that Caliph Uthman bin Affan sent to the Islamic countries, including the Medina Quran, and his own Quran, which he was reading on the day he was killed in 35 AH, and which he is said it was written by his hand. Al-Sijistani reports from Iyas ibn Sakhr ibn Abi al-Jahm: "Uthman's own Imam's Quran differed from the Qurans of the people of Medina in twelve Ahruf." Uthman's personal Quran remained with him until Uthman's death, and all narratives agree that when some of those besieging his house broke into it, Uthman he took his Quran and placed it on his lap to pray and read from it, then the rebels surprised him by attacking, and one of them stepped forward, drew his sword, and plunged it into him, his wife, Naela bint al-Farafsa, grabbed the sword with her hand, the sword cut off her fingers, and the sword went into Uthman's neck, killing him instantly. Uthman was martyred while reciting his own Quran, and a few pages of it were stained with drops of his blood, these drops of blood had an impact to the extent that it reached the level of sanctity. It has prompted major mosques in the Islamic world to dispute its acquisition and scramble to acquire it for blessing.

=== Later history ===
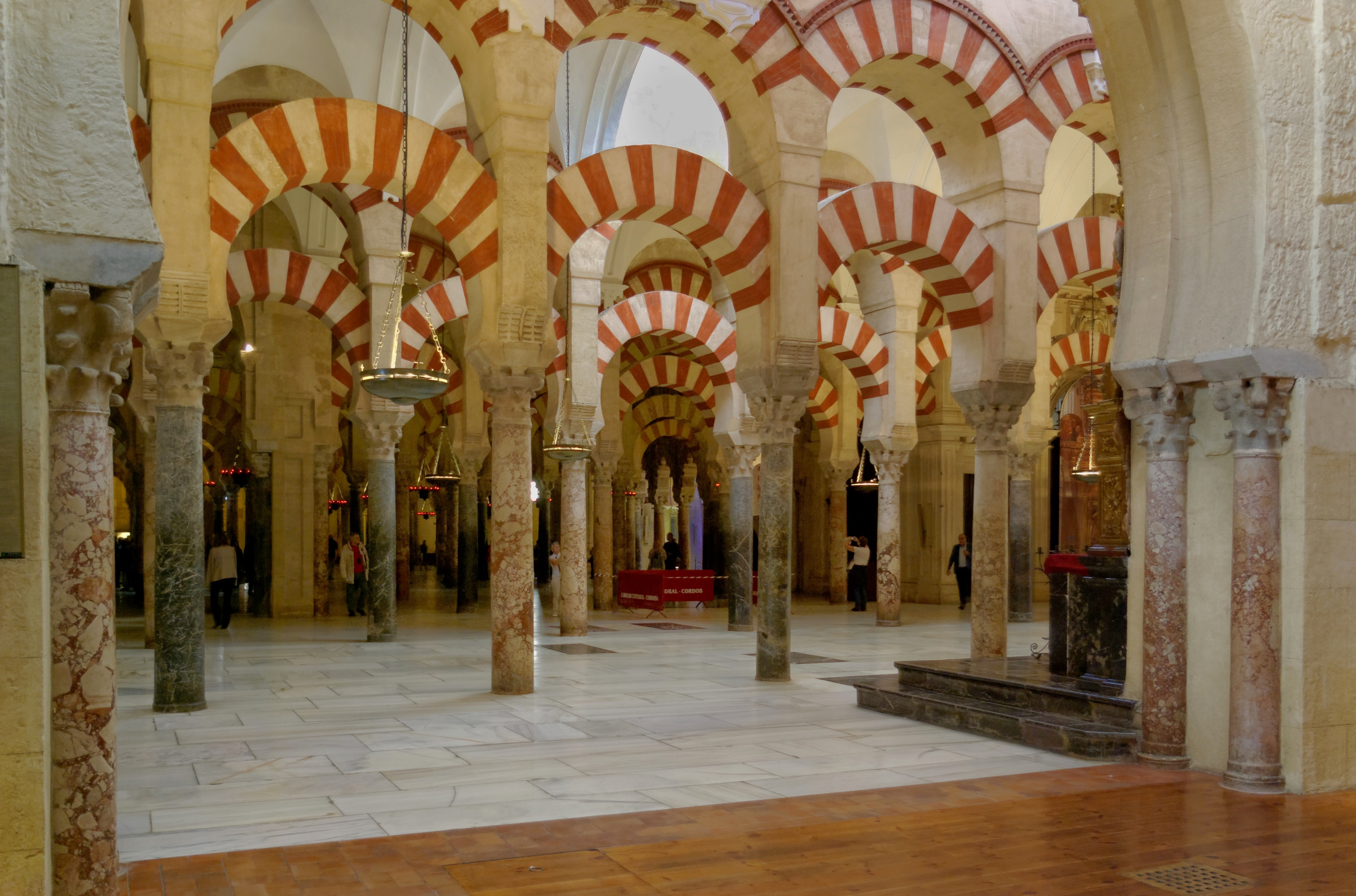
The Cordoba Mosque, where Uthman's personal Quran is said to have been kept in the house of his pulpit, from the third to the sixth century AH.

Uthman's Quran, which he was reading at the time of his martyrdom, passed after his death to one of two people, both of whom bore the name Khalid, Al-Samhoudi recounted: "I was informed that Uthman's Quran passed to Khalid ibn Amr ibn Uthman ibn Affan." Al-Samhudi narrates another narration, saying: "Ibn Qutaiba said: Uthman's Quran, was in the possession of his son Khalid and then became with his children as they descended." It is more likely that Uthman's Quran was in the possession of Khalid ibn Amr ibn Uthman, because he is closer to Muawiya ibn Abi Sufyan and Bani Umayyah than Khalid ibn Uthman. Ibn Abd al-Malik al-Marrakchi narrates that this Quran, which was drenched with Uthman's blood, was lost in Medina during some of the turmoil in the city. Malik ibn Anas says: "The Quran of Uthman bin Affan was lost, and we did not find any news about it." Ibn Abd al-Malik al-Marrakshi narrates that a person named Abu Bakr Muhammad ibn Ahmad ibn Ya'qub reported that he heard from his father Ahmad and saw in his grandfather's handwriting what confirms that this grandfather Ya'qub saw the Imam's Quran itself in Iraq, and he says: "My father told me: I saw the Quran of Uthman ibn Affan in the month of Rabi' al-Awwal in the year 223 AH, sent by Abu Ishaq, the Al-Mu'tasim Billah, son of the Caliph, Abu Ja'far Harun al-Rashid, I measured the length of the Quran, and it was two inches and four fingers apart, and I counted the lines of some of the Quran papers. There were twenty-eight lines in the paper, and I saw a trace of blood on many pages of the Quran, some as much as half of the paper, some as much as a third, some less and some more, and on the edges of many pages."

The Quran was hidden until its appearance in 223 AH, historian Sahar al-Sayyed says that the Quran of Uthman ibn Affan, drenched in his blood, was kept in Uthman's house in Medina, Dar al-Hijra, throughout the Umayyad era. It was missing from the city at the beginning of the first Abbasid era, perhaps around the time the Abbasids stormed the city in 169 AH and completely overran it. In other words, the Imam's Quran moved from Medina in the early Abbasid era, specifically in 169 AH to Baghdad, where it was kept by the Abbasid caliphs in their treasuries. Historians suggest that the Imam's Quran traveled to Andalusia during the reign of Prince Abd ar-Rahman II (206 AH - 238 AH). He used to send merchants to buy the treasures of Iraq, including books of famous writers, antiques, and necklaces. It is not far-fetched that he sent for the Imam's Quran from Iraq. This is confirmed by Ibn Hayyan al-Qurtubi, who narrated that after the death of Abd al-Rahman al-Awsat, Habib al-Saqlabi called for the Quran attributed to Uthman ibn Affan, and he swore to Muhammad and trusted him. Al-Idrisi states that the Quran in the Cordoba Mosque is the Quran Uthman ibn Affan which he wrote with his hand. Al-Maqri mentions that this Quran was the Quran of Uthman ibn Affan, which he was reading at the time of his martyrdom: "In the aforementioned mosque, was the Quran of Uthman bin Affan, which was written by his own hand, with a gold ornament covered with rubies, with brocade covers and on a chair made of wet oud with gold nails." Historians Ibn Bashkawal and Ibn Abdul Malik al-Marrakchi believe that the Quran in the Cordoba mosque was not Uthman's personal Quran, but was one of the four Qurans that Uthman ordered to be copied and sent to the four cities of Kufa, Basra, Mecca, and the Levant.

The Cordoba Quran gained its prestige and sanctity from the four pages that were taken from the original Quran of Caliph Uthman and stained with drops of his blood on the day of his martyrdom while reading it. Hence, the people of Andalusia honored and revered their Quran, and the situation continued as it was until the time of the Almohads, who feared that the Quran would be lost in Andalusia due to Cordoba's exposure to Christian raids on the one hand, and on the other, they wished to keep it in their vaults in Morocco for blessing on the other hand, so it was moved from Cordoba to Morocco in 552 AH. When Abd al-Mu'min ibn Ali brought Uthman's Quran to Morocco, he took great care of it and took great care of its cover and replaced it, after it was made of dark leather, he covered it with gold sheets studded with rubies and precious stones such as sapphires and emeralds. The Imam's Quran remained in the care of the Almohads until 646 AH, when the state weakened and its caliph Ibrahim ibn Ali ibn al-Ma'mun was killed, the Sultan's treasuries were looted, and the Imam's Quran was plundered, when the Emir of Tlemcen, Yaghmurasan ibn Zayyan al-Zannati, learned that the Quran had been snatched from the hands of its looters, he ordered it to be preserved. Then the Imam's Quran fell into the hands of the Portuguese in the Battle of Tarif, which took place between the Castilians and the Marinids on Muharram 741 AH corresponding to 1340, and the battle ended with the defeat of the Marinids. The Marinid Sultan made a great effort to retrieve the Quran, sending a merchant to redeem the Quran with whatever money was required, and Abu Ali al-Hasan ibn Jinni succeeded in retrieving the Quran, the Quran continued to be kept in the Marinid vaults, and its news has been lost since that time.

== Other copies ==
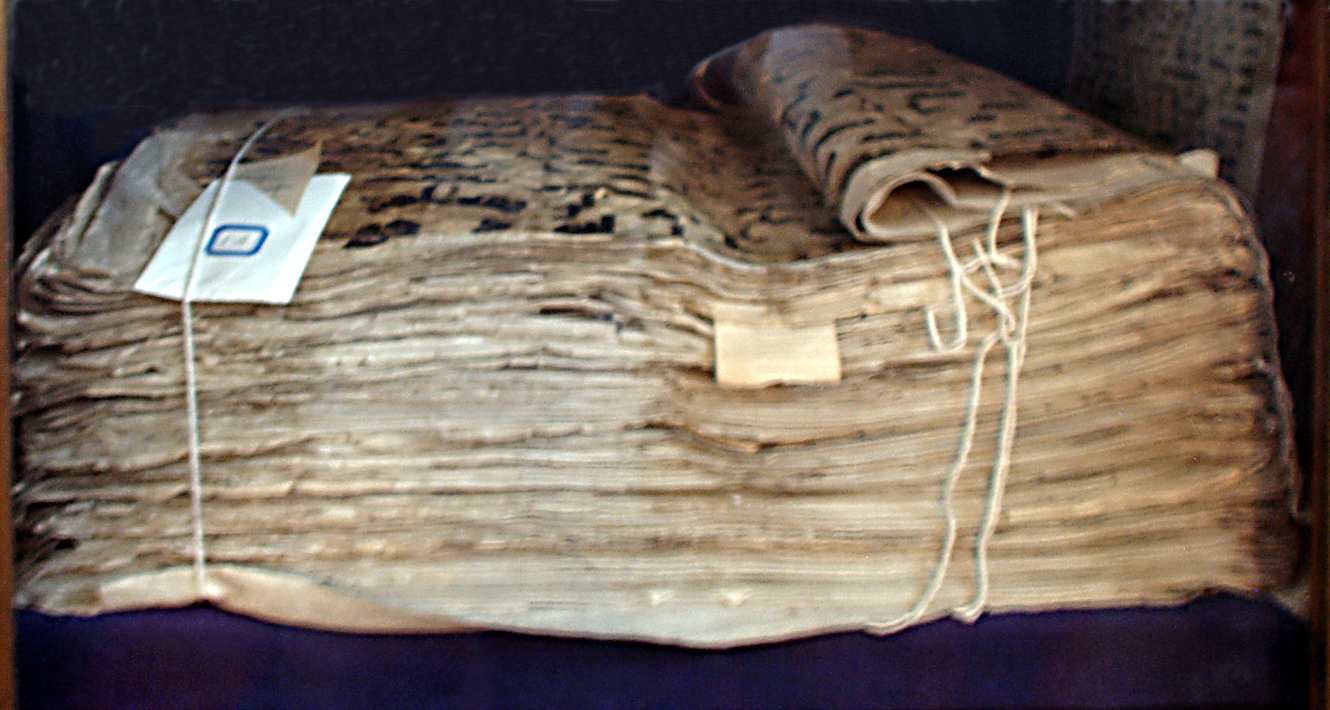
The Tashkent Quran is claimed to be Uthman's personal Quran.

=== The Samarkand Quran ===
The Center for Islamic Civilization in Tashkent, Uzbekistan holds a very early Quran codex written on parchment, which they claim is the personal Quran owned by Uthman ibn Affan and which was stained with his blood during his martyrdom. The Quran is characterized by a lack of dots. Each of its pages contains 12 lines and 353 pages measuring (68 cm x 53 cm). The Quran was previously kept in the Khoja Ahrar madrassa of Samarkand, from which it was forcibly removed to the Imperial Public Library in Saint Petersburg in 1868 by the Russian army during the Russian conquest of Central Asia. It was repatriated to Tashkent in 1923 following a series of petitions from Turkestani Jadids to the Bolsheviks.

According to competing narratives circulating in 19th century Turkestan, the Quran was brought from Istanbul to Samarkand by the murids of Khoja Ahrar, a Naqshbandi sufi master, or by Amir Timur as a war trophy from his conquests in Western Asia. Historians have alternatively suggested two ways in which the Quran arrived in Samarkand. That the Quran arrived in Samarkand during the rule of the Golden Horde (621 AH-907 AH) and that it was a gift from the Mamluk Sultan Rukn al-Din Baybars, who had married the daughter of Berke Khan, the Khan of the Golden Horde. Second, this Quran is the same Quran that Ibn Battuta saw when he visited Basra and it was moved from Basra to Samarkand by Timur Lenk.

The second view has been accepted by some historians and rejected by others, who support the idea that the Quran traveled from Basra to Samarkand. They refer to the Tashkent Quran as one of the copies that Uthman sent to the Islamic countries, and they base this on the image of the handwriting in which the Tashkent Quran was written, which they say is as close as possible to the image of the writing in which the Imam's Quran was written. Opponents of the idea that the Quran traveled from Basra argue that the artistry of the Tashkent Quran is visible in the drawing of the letters, indicating that the handwriting does not date back to the caliphate of Uthman ibn Affan, it dates back to the second or third century AH, the lines are straight and appear to have been drawn with a ruler, and the shape of the letters of this Quran is very similar to that of the Kufic Quran now in Kairouan, which it dates back to the third century.

=== The Istanbul Quran ===
A Quran located in the Topkapi Museum that was written on parchment it is said to be the Quran that was in the hands of Caliph Uthman bin Affan on the day he was killed, and traces of blood are still visible on its pages to this day. According to the description of this Quran, it is dotted with red color, and at the end of the verses there is sometimes a circle occupied by geometric lines, it is said to have been written in the handwriting of Caliph Uthman ibn Affan. This description indicates that this Quran is not an Uthmanic Quran. The Quran is inscribed and dotted, which was not a characteristic of Uthmanic Qurans, which were non-dotted Qurans. In the Qatar Islamic Cultural Center in Doha, a copy of the Istanbul Quran is inscribed next to it for identification: "This large Quran is an image of the oldest Quran in existence, preserved in the Topkapi Palace in Istanbul, dating back more than 1,400 years, and the image here was taken from the original book page by page to show that the Quran is preserved throughout the ages."

== Uthmanic illustration ==
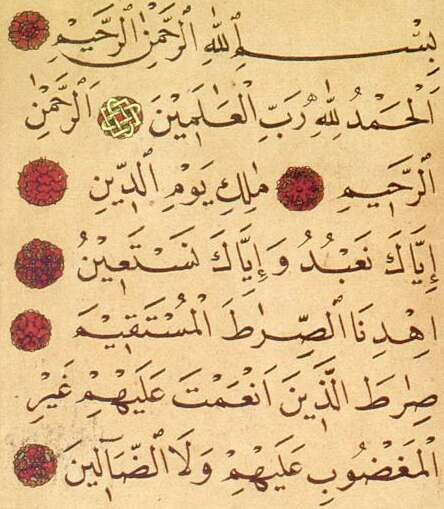
A sample of the Uthmanic illustration of Surat al-Fatiha.

The word Quranic illustration refers to the Quranic writing in which the Quran was written in Uthman's Quran, which in some words is contrary to the rules of orthography and is not identical to the spoken pronunciation. The Uthmanic script is defined in the terminology as the position accepted by the Companions during the reign of Uthman bin Affan in writing the words and letters of the Quran which is the science that recognizes the violation of the Uthmanic Quran's handwriting to the principles of standard drawing. The term dates back to the Qurans copied by Caliph Uthman ibn Affan, which he sent to the Muslim countries, and were without dots and shapes. It is possible that the Quranic recitation was stabilized in the last presentation and its recitation has not been copied. The reason this script is called the Uthmanic script is because Uthman was the one who ordered this drawing to be transferred and copied in the Qurans that he copied and distributed to the people in the cities and ordered them to burn the others, and this generalization issued by him is what attached this attribution to him, Imam al-Baghawi says in this regard: "The Quran on which the matter was settled is the last version by Muhammad, so Uthman ordered it to be copied in the Qurans, and gathered people on it, and eliminated everything else to cut off the source of disagreement." Secondly: The Uthman Quran has a special way of distributing the Quran so that it can accommodate all the frequent Quranic readings. Third: Uthman ibn Affan gathered all the people on one of the seven Ahruf on which the Quran was revealed, which is the letter on which most of the Quran was revealed and written down. Uthman obliged them with this script in which the general Quran was written and left them with the permit to read other Ahruf in accordance with the script. Makki ibn Abi Talib explains: "The Quran was written on one Ahruf, and its handwriting is possible for more than one, as it was neither dotted nor cursive, so that possibility is from the remaining six Ahruf " Ibn Taymiyyah states: "The reason for the variety of readings in the Quran is that the Sharia permits and authorizes this for them, as this is due to the Sunnah and not to opinion and innovation."

=== Uthmanic illustration rules ===
The written word must be in accordance with the spoken word, without increase or decrease, without change or alteration, taking into account starting and stopping, separating and connecting, scholars have paved the way for it with principles and rules, and in some letters it is contrary to the Imam's Quranic script, which is why it has been said that two lines cannot be compared, the Quranic line and Arabic prosody, and the drawing is limited to six rules:

- The first rule is deletion: Letters even if it does exist in the correct spelling in Arabic.
- The second rule is the increase: They are in letters Alef, Baa, and Yaa.
- The third rule is the hamza: In the Uthman illustration, the hamza is sometimes depicted as an Alef, Wow, and Yaa.
- The fourth rule is the wildcard: The Alef as Wow or Yaa.
- The fifth rule Separate and Connect: In the Uthmanic Quran, some words are connected when they should be separated, and others are separated when they should be connected
- The sixth rule is multiple readings: According to this rule, some words that are read with two readings are written with one of the two readings, this is all outside the scope of the anomalous readings, and sometimes some of the anomalous readings are taken into account in the illustration.

=== Evolution of Uthmanic illustration ===
Stages in the evolution of the Uthmanic Quran's punctuation and formation.

Uthman's Qurans were written without dots and formulas so that they could be read with the seven Ahruf in which the Quran was revealed, during this period, conquests expanded, and many non-Arabic-speaking nations were converted to Islam. Foreign language was widespread among the people and there was a lot of melody even among the Arabs themselves, due to their frequent mixing and intermarriage with Arabs, and because the Quran was without dots, the Muslim rulers feared that it would be subject to melody and distortion.

Abu al-Aswad ad-Du'ali complained to Ali about this phenomenon, so he taught him the principles of grammar, and told him: "A name is what signifies the noun, a verb is what signifies the movement of the noun, and a letter is what is neither one nor the other."

It is said that Ziyad ibn Abi Sufyan was the first person to turn to dotting the Qur'an, and that Muawiya ibn Abi Sufyan wrote to Ziyad when he was governor of Basra to send his son Ubaydullah to him. When he entered the house, he found that his son was tuning his reading, he wrote to Ziyad to blame him for his son's speech, so Ziyad sent Abu al-Aswad ad-Du'ali telling him: "This redness has multiplied and corrupted the tongues of the Arabs, so if you put something in place to reform people's speech and translate the Quran". Abu al-Aswad apologized, so Ziyad resorted to a trick by putting a man in his path and when Abu al-Aswad passed by him, the man read a verse from the Quran and deliberately twisted it. This made Abu al-Aswad angry, and he said, "It is shameful for Allah to disown His Messenger." And he said to Ziyad: "I have answered you to what you asked for, and I thought I would start with the Quran's pronunciation."

Abu al-Aswad ad-Du'ali then put a dot as a control for the Quran. Abu al-Aswad was the first to put dots for control, as he put the dot in front of the letter to mark the Dhamma, and a dot above it is a sign of Fatha, and if it is below it, it is for a Kasra, and the writing continued in this way until Al-Khalil ibn Ahmad al-Farahidi came up with a more precise tuning than Abu Al-Aswad Al-Du'ali's tuning. Instead of dots a blanked Alef above the letter as a sign of opening, and below it as a sign of kasra, and a small Wow head as a sign of compression, and then he made dots on the letters to distinguish them.

=== Uthmanic illustration: A obligatory or choice ===
The majority of scholars believe that it is obligatory to follow the Uthmanic script when writing the Quran and that it is not permissible to deviate from it, because it is a convention agreed upon by the Companions unanimously, as Ahmad bin Hanbal said: "It is forbidden to violate Uthman's writing in Wawah, Yah, Alef, etc." Another group argued that Uthmanic writing is a convention rather than a prescriptive one, so it is not obligatory to follow it and there is no prohibition to deviate from it, if people agree on a special drawing for dictation and it is common among them.

The Council of Senior Scholars has prepared detailed research on the issue of writing the Quran according to the rules of orthography: "To summarize, those who said that it is permissible to write the Quran according to the rules of orthography and those who said it is forbidden or forbidden have a point of view. However, the justifications for permissibility are subject to the aforementioned criticisms and debates, and may not be able to support the argument of permissibility, yet they are opposed by the aforementioned contraindications, and in accordance with the well-known rule that prohibition is prioritized over permissibility, and that the side of preventing harms prevails over bringing benefits when there is a tie or a preponderance of the side of harm. It may be argued that it is more prudent to stay with the Uthmanic form of the Quran, in any case, the issue is a matter of consideration and jurisprudence, and the good is to follow the Companions and the Imams of the Salaf."

The Council of the Islamic Fiqh Academy supported not changing the Uthmanic illustration: "After reviewing all this, the Council of the Islamic Fiqh Academy unanimously decided to support the decision of the Council of Senior Scholars in the Kingdom of Saudi Arabia that it is not permissible to change the drawing of the Uthman's Quran and that the letterform must remain as it is."

== Reception in Shia Islam ==
Shiite scholars acknowledge the preservation of the Quran from any kind of verbal distortion in all its forms with strong evidence and proof. They acknowledge that it was Hudhayfah ibn al-Yaman who advised Uthman ibn Affan to compile the Quran. However, they take issue with Uthman's reliance on collecting and copying the Quran from the Quran that was in the possession of Hafsa bint Umar, while ignoring the other Qurans that were in the possession of the Companions, including the Quran of Ali. Shiites believe that the first person to collect the Quran was Ali ibn Abi Talib, and that Imam Ali isolated himself after the death of the Muhammad to collect the Quran. It is narrated that he did not put on his robe until he had collected the Quran. Ibn al-Nadim reported that he only put on his robe for prayer until he had collected it. Ibn al-Nadim said: "Ali saw that the people were nervous when the Prophet died, so he swore not to put on his robe until he had collected the Quran." The Shiites say that Imam Ali had a Quran like the other Qurans that were later collected, but the role of these Qurans ended when Uthman sent them and burned them, while Ali's Quran was kept for himself and his family and was not shown to anyone, to preserve the unity of the Ummah. They said that the difference between Imam Ali's Quran and the other Qurans, including Uthman's, is that Ali arranged it according to what was revealed, and included explanations and interpretations of verses with reasons and locations of revelation. Ali ibn Abi Talib said: "No verse was revealed to the Muhammad except that he read it to me and dictated it to me, and I wrote it down in my own handwriting, and he taught me its interpretation, its explanation, and its similarities, I have never forgotten a verse from the Book of Allah, nor a knowledge that He has dictated to me that I have written down since he prayed for me." The Quran also includes a number of Quranic sciences such as Mihkam, Mutashabiya, Mansukh, Naskh, and the interpretation of verses and their interpretation. Shiite scholars narrate that Ibn Abi Talib presented his Quran to the people and explained its features and a man from the Companions stood up and looked at it and said, "O Ali, return it, we have no need for it."

The Shiite narratives summarize that Ali ibn Abi Talib compiled the Quran after the death of Muhammad, and its verses and chapters were the verses and chapters of the Quran in circulation among Muslims today, and it included the order of the chapters according to the revelation and the reasons for the revelation, but the attitude of some of the companions towards his Quran was a political one, and therefore it is better to consider it another version of the Quran with the same chapters and verses, and not another Quran totally.

== Bibliography ==
- The Quran, Ibn Abi Dawud, Al-Farouq Al-Hadith (1423 AH-2002 AD).
- The Quran, Al-Sijistani, Dar Al-Basha'ir Al-Islamiya (1423 AH-2002).
- The Collection of the Quran: An Analytical Study of its Narratives, Akram Abdul Khalifa Al-Dulaimi, Dar Al-Kutub Al-Alamiya (1427 A.H. 2006).
- The Collection of the Holy Quran by Memorization and Writing, Ali bin Sulaiman Al-Ubaid, King Fahd Complex for Printing the Holy Quran in Medina (2010).
- Collecting the Holy Quran during the reign of the Rashidin Caliphs, Abdul Qayyum Abdul Ghafoor Al-Sindi, King Fahd Complex for Printing the Holy Quran in Madinah (2010).
- Al-Maqna'a in the Drawing of the Qurans, Uthman ibn Sa'id al-Dani, Al-Azhar College Library (1978).
- Al-Badei'ah in the knowledge of what is drawn in the Quran of 'Uthman, Ibn Mu'adh al-Juhani al-Andalusi, Dar Imad for Publishing and Distribution.
- The Holy Quran attributed to Uthman bin Affan, copy of the Topkapi Saray Museum, Tayyar al-Ti Volaj, Tamuna Press (1428 AH - 2007).
- Awakening the flags for the obligation to follow the drawing of the Quran attributed to Imam Uthman ibn Affan, Muhammad Habibullah al-Shinqiti, Maktaba al-Maarifa (1392 AH-1972).
