= Hinckelmann edition =

17th-century Quran edition

The Hinckelmann edition is an Arabic edition of the Quran produced by the German Protestant theologian and Islamologist Abraham Hinckelmann in Hamburg, 1694. This was the first time the Quran was printed in its entirety in Europe, and the original copy is still located in the Württembergische Landesbibliothek library in Stuttgart, Germany.

Hinckelmann was able to produce this edition due to his ownership of at least six Quran manuscripts, as well as a total of over two-hundred oriental books and manuscripts, including over seventy in Arabic and over fifty in Persian.

== Release ==
Hinckelmann's edition was originally released under the Latin title Al-Coranus s. lex Islamitica Muhammedis, filii Abdallae pseudoprophetae. Hinckelmann prefaced the Quranic text with a polemical critique of Islam, and the edition ends with an extensive errata list to help indicate that his edition was far from flawless. Aside from some printing errors, the verse numbering scheme of the Hinckelmann edition does not correspond to that of other Quran editions, and Hinckelmann did not follow a single variant reading. Hinckelmann made the decision to only print the Arabic text without a translation into any European language, for several reasons, including that he believed in the value of Arabic literature, he thought that Christians should be familiar with the Islamic scripture in its original language, he believed that much of the Quran could be understood simply, and that by contrast the production of a translation would involve a disproportionate philological effort to produce.

However, another likely issue limiting Hinckelmann in producing a translation was that he owned a copy of just one tafsir, the Tafsir al-Jalalayn. Nevertheless, four years later, the Italian priest Ludovico Maracci would publish the Marracci edition of the Quran in Padua in 1698, this time including a translation and a commentary. The production of these two editions inspired newfound European interest in the Quran and its history of translation.

== Usage ==
The Hinckelmann edition gave Western researchers access to a printed Quran text for the first time, and was used until it was superseded by the Flügel edition.

== See also ==
- Cairo edition
- Gustav Leberecht Flügel
- History of the Quran
- Lex Mahumet pseudoprophete
