= Abraham Hinckelmann =

German theologian

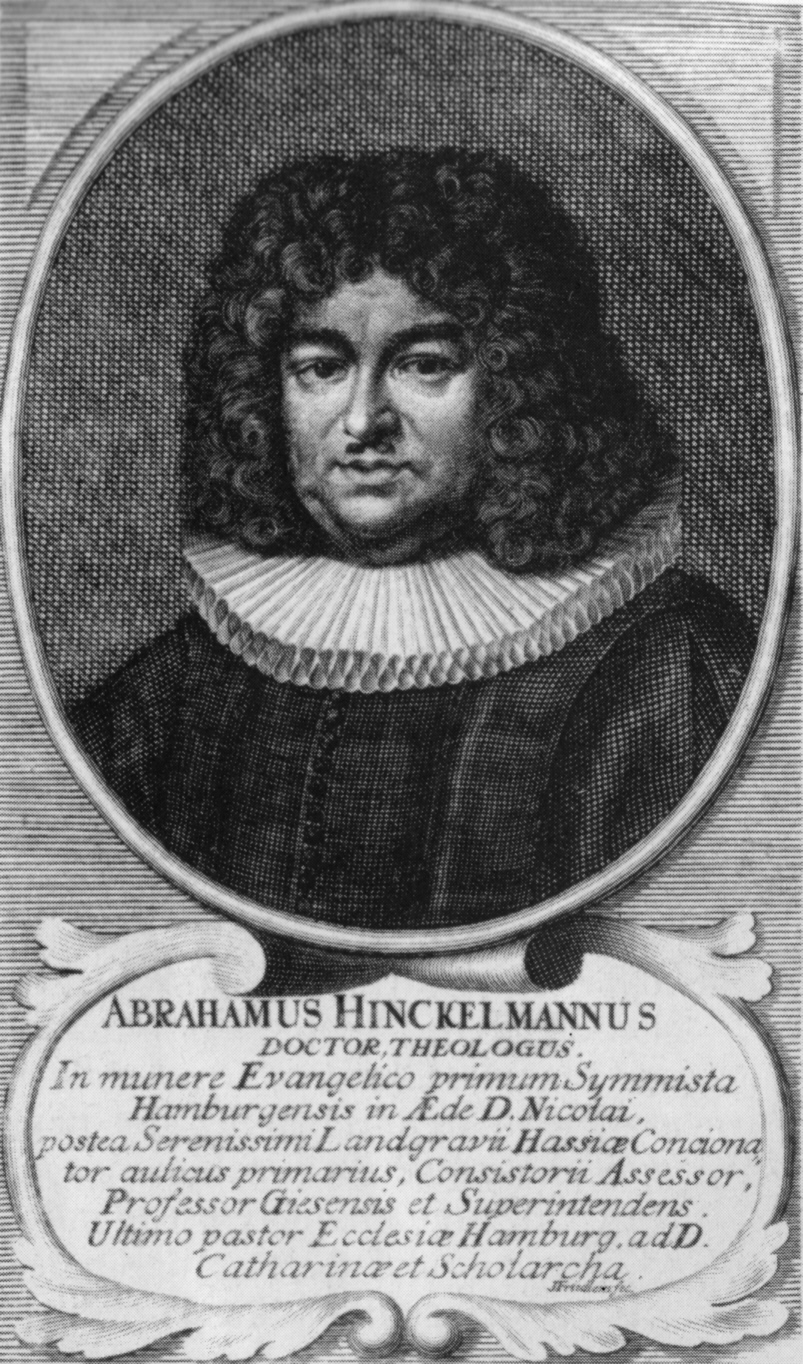
Abraham Hinckelmann

Abraham Hinckelmann (2 May 1652, Döbeln, Electorate of Saxony – 11 February 1695), a German Protestant theologian, was an Islamologist who was one of the first to print a complete edition of the Qur'an in Hamburg in 1694.

Later in 1698, a cleric named Ludovico Marracci from the "Society of the Monks of the Divine Path" published another edition which, unlike Hinckelmann's, also included a translation and commentary of the Quran.

== See also ==
- Gustav Leberecht Flügel
- Flügel edition
