= Marracci edition =

17th-century Quran edition

The Marracci edition is an Arabic edition and Latin translation of the Quran from 1698. It was published in two volumes under the title Alcorani Textus Universus Arabicè et Latinè in Padua, Italy by Ludovico Marracci, an Italian Oriental scholar and professor of Arabic in the College of Wisdom at Rome. His version of the Qurʻan included a life of Muhammad, with notes, and refutations of Muslim doctrines. The introduction to the work, in Latin, entitled the Prodromus Ad Refutationem Alcoran, was published several years earlier in 1691. Marracci published his Quran edition only four years after the publication of the Hinckelmann edition.

== Motivation and circumstances ==
Marracci believed that for Christians to effectively rebut Islamic doctrine, they had to know it, which contributed to his desire to produce an Arabic edition and translation of the Quran. As such, it was not necessarily meant to be read by Muslims. However, Marracci's initial learning of Arabic came for another reason entirely, as he learned the language under the influence of a local community of Maronites. Before producing his Arabic edition of the Quran, he had produced an Arabic translation of the Bible, having been commissioned to do so with other collaborators by the Congregatio de Propaganda Fide. Though the translation was completed in 1649, it was only finally published in 1671 under the title Biblia Sacra Arabica. Marracci would acquire ecclesiastical approval to begin his Quran project in 1691, though he had been petitioning for it years earlier, and in that year he published prefatory material called the Prodromus ("Introduction") for the forthcoming work. He encountered a technical issue in Arabic printing with the Propaganda Fide, but was able to overcome the issue as Padua had recently acquired the necessary technology for this printing as well.

Marracci employed a range of Quran commentaries to inform his work, including those of Ibn Abī Zamanīn, Thaʿlabī, Zamakhsharī, Bayḍāwī, and Suyūtī, as well as texts of the hadith literature, especially Sahih al-Bukhari.

== Influence ==
=== Subsequent work ===
The immense nature of Marracci's project made many others give up on similar prospects of producing an Arabic edition or Latin translation of the Quran, and paved the way for other scholars to work on subsequent projects. For example, Andreas Acoluthus, who had developed a friendship with Marracci after seeing his Prodromus appear in 1691, would wait after the 1698 edition came out and, in 1701, publish the Tetrapla Alcoranica, which was only the opening surah of the Quran but with a long introduction. This was also a polyglot Quran, so it did not merely produce a Latin version as had Marracci, but also produced versions in Turkish and Persian. Though he died only two years later, Acoluthus' criticisms of some elements of Marracci's translation and his anti-Islamic polemic would prove influential among German orientalists.

=== Popularity ===
In Germany Marracci's edition was an immediate success, being translated into German in 1703 by David Nerreter under the title Mahometanische Moschea. Unlike Marracci, Nerreter aimed his work at a lay audience as opposed to the technical one presupposed by Marracci's work. In 1718, Johann Gottfried Lakemacher issued his Elementa linguae arabicae, containing Marracci's edition of Surah 15 with an interlinear Latin translation, closely influenced by Marracci's own translation. In 1721, Christian Reineccius published a revised version of Marracci's edition, having changed it by omitting the polemical content.

Marracci's edition was also popular in the Low Countries. In 1733 Emo Lucius Vriemoet from the University of Franeker published Arabismus; exhibens grammaticam Arabicam novam, et monumenta quaedam Arabica. This included three surahs in Latin translation and commentary (32, 67, 75) with another two solely in Arabic (86, 90).

=== Translations ===
George Sale's English translation of the Quran, The Alcoran of Mohammed, in 1734, was done based on Marracci's 1698 Latin translation and would remain the dominant translation in informing the Western tradition about the content of the Quran until the early twentieth century. Sale's English was elegant and quickly declared to be the best translation: in 1746, Theodor Arnold translated it into German. In 1772, David Friederich Megerlin produced the first direct translation of the Quran into German from the Arabic edition: Die türkische Bibel, oder des Korans allererste teutsche Uebersetzung aus der Arabischen Urschrift selbst verfertiget. He expressed his admiration in the introduction for the earlier translations of Marracci and Sale. French already had a translation by 1643, on the basis of the medieval 1543 translation of Robert of Ketton. By 1770, it had achieved ten editions and was rendered into several other languages.

=== Criticism ===
George Sale did not stay entirely within the bounds of Marracci's work, having criticized his refutations as impertinent and viewed his translation as too literal.

Despite Sale's access to Tafsīr al-Bayḍāwī, all his quotations derived from those cited by Marracci.

Friederich Eberhard Boysen also found it to be literal, publishing a list of translation errors in 1745. Nevertheless, he acknowledged his great debt to Marracci's work. Johann David Michaelis also believed that Marracci's work could be improved considerably, and offered a specimen in a 1754 publication involving the first 116 verses from the second surah. Michaelis also questioned Marracci's use of tafsir, believing that they were later superstitions elaborated on the text of the Quran and were no more necessary to understanding it than the Church Fathers were necessary to understanding the Bible. As such, Michaelis believed that the Quran should be freed from any authority and read on its own terms to understand what Muhammad said. In so desiring to establish the original meaning of the text, he was a forerunner of the application of the historical-critical method to Islamic texts. Marracci would continue to be criticized for various reasons, including his literal approach and hostility to Islam, but subsequent works for many decades, despite their claimed independence, would continue to owe much to his work.

== See also ==
- Cairo edition
- Flügel edition
- Lex Mahumet pseudoprophete
