= Amiri (typeface) =

Arabic Naskh typeface

Amiri أميري
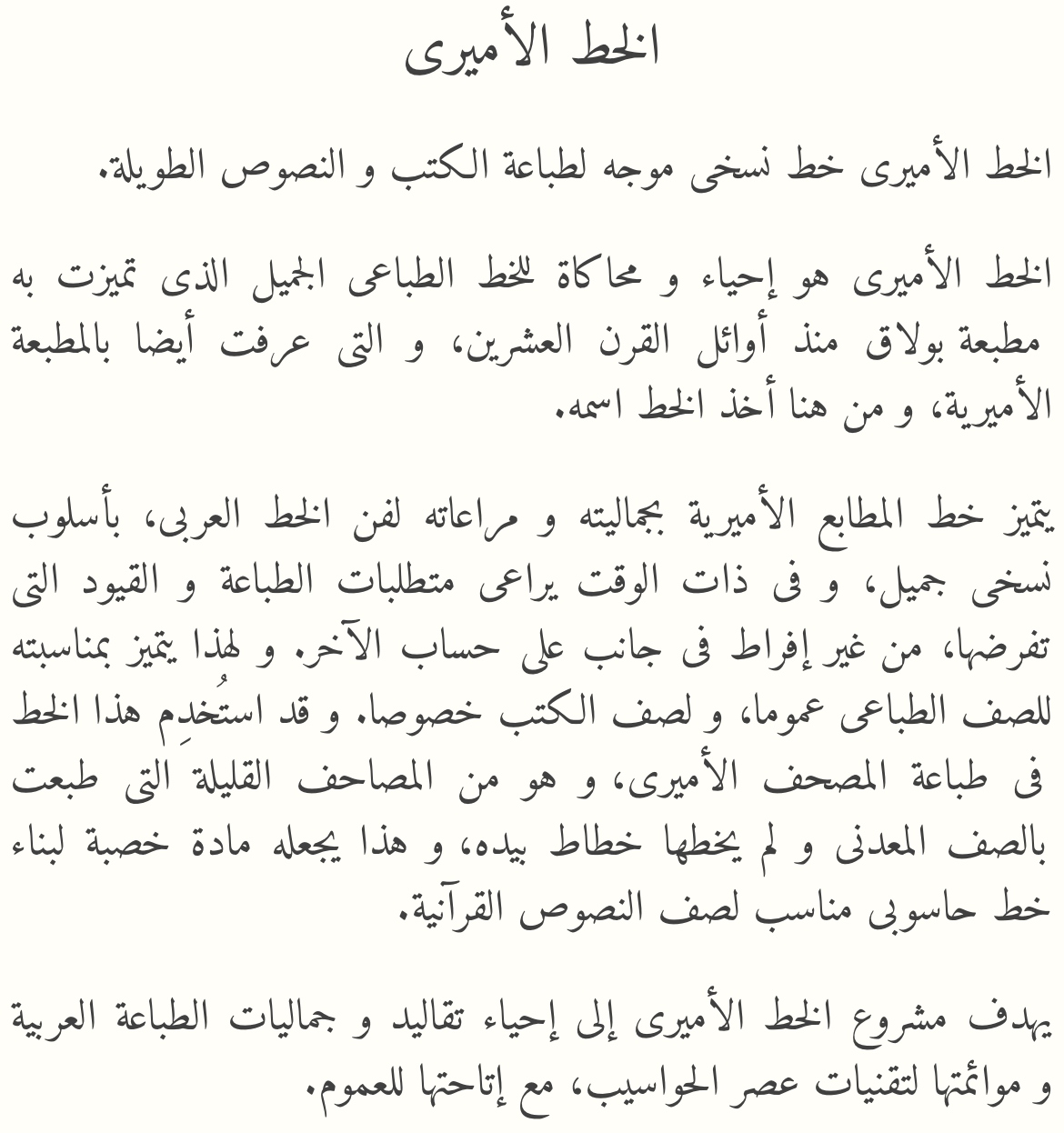
- Category: Naskh
- Designer(s): Khaled Hosny
- Foundry: Alif Type
- Date created: September 19, 2010; 14 years ago
- Date released: December 2011
- Characters: U+0600–U+06FF Arabic; U+0750–U+077F Arabic Supplement
- Glyphs: 6000+
- License: OFL
- Website: aliftype.com/amiri/
- Latest release version: 1.003
- Latest release date: November 19, 2024; 8 months ago

Amiri (Arabic: أميري) is a Naskh typeface for Arabic script designed by Khaled Hosny. The beta was released in December 2011. As of October 22, 2019, it is hosted on 67,000 websites, and is served by the Google Fonts API approximately 74.8 million times per week.

== Inspiration ==
Amiri is a revival of a Naskh typeface pioneered by the Bulaq Press (مطبعة بولاق), also called al-Mataabi' al-Amiriya (المطابع الأميرية), in 1905. It was famously used to print the Cairo edition, one of the first typeset-printed editions of the Quran to be certified by an Islamic authority—Al-Azhar—in 1924.

On the 1905 typeface and the challenges of digitizing Arabic script, Hosny wrote: "One of the most novel features of the Bulaq typeface is maintaining the aesthetics of Naskh calligraphy while meeting the requirements (and limitations) of typesetting, a balance that is not easily achieved."

The Amiri project was supported by Google Web Fonts, TeX Users Group, and donations from users.

== Features ==
Amiri was released under the SIL Open Font License.

The typeface itself has four styles: regular, bold, slanted, bold slanted, and two companions for Quranic typesetting: Amiri Quran and Amiri Quran Colored. All of which are available in TrueType outlines and OpenType format.

The Amiri font makes extensive use of OpenType features to produce automatic positioning and substitutions, including wide varieties of contextual forms, ligatures and kerning to the Arabic letters and the verse number of āyah, and offers several optional features including character variants for specific letters and text figures for Arabic digits.

The Amiri font itself was published and developed exclusively with free software, including FontForge, Inkscape, Python and VIM.
