= History of the Quran =

The history of the Quran, the holy book of Islam, is the timeline ranging from the inception of the Quran during the lifetime of Muhammad (believed to have received the Quran through revelation between 610 and 632 CE), to the emergence, transmission, and canonization of its written copies. In Sunni tradition, it is believed that the first caliph Abu Bakr ordered Zayd ibn Thabit to compile the written Quran, relying upon both textual fragments and the memories of those who had memorized it during Muhammad's lifetime, with the rasm (undotted Arabic text) being officially canonized under the third caliph Uthman ibn Affan (r. 644–656 CE), leading the Quran as it exists today to be known as the Uthmanic codex. Some Shia Muslims believe that the fourth caliph Ali ibn Abi Talib was the first to compile the Quran shortly after Muhammad died. The history of the Quran is a major focus in the field of Quranic studies.

In the 1970s, historians in the field of Islamic origins began to question Islamic "literary sources" – tafsir (i.e. commentaries on the Quran), hadith, (i.e. the accounts of what the Islamic prophet Muhammad approved of or did not), and sira, (i.e. the biography of the prophet) – upon which the traditional account of the Quran were based. They employed a "source-critical" approach to this literature, including as evidence relevant archaeology, epigraphy, numismatics, and contemporary non-Arabic literature, that they argued provided "hard facts" and an ability to crosscheck. There have also been a number of proposals for refinement of the traditional view and even its fundamental re-evaluation.

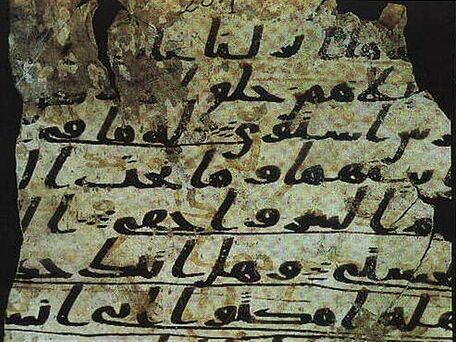
A fragment showing part of Surat Ta-Ha; The Sanaa palimpsest is one of the oldest Quranic manuscripts in existence. The most comprehensive and oldest surviving Quranic text. It offers a framework with a historical limited number of characters—lacking punctuation and advanced reading aids—that allows for various modes of reading.

While traditional accounts may trace the canonization process of the Quran back to Uthman —or, in some cases, even to Abu Bakr or Muhammad himself— some Western scholars believe that this process continued over the course of several centuries, lasting until the rise of the Abbasids. (Note: Ibn Babawayh was the first major Twelver author "to adopt a position identical to that of the Sunnis" and the change was a result of the "rise to power of the Sunni 'Abbasid caliphate," whence belief in the corruption of the Quran became untenable vis-a-vis the position of Sunni "orthodoxy".) Although The canonization process is believed to have been highly conservative, some amount of textual evolution is also indicated by the existence of codices like the Sanaa manuscript. Beyond this, a group of researchers explores the irregularities and repetitions in the Quranic text in a way that refutes the traditional claim that it was preserved by memorization alongside writing. According to them, an oral period shaped the Quran as a text and order, and mentioned repetitions and irregularities were remnants of this period.

The modern Qur'an contains numerous commands ("ql" meaning "say") which give it the image of a divine word addressed directly to Muhammad. Michael Cook offers an explanation of this phenomenon by examining the historical development of the Arabic writing system; in the original texts there was no distinction between "say" or "he said". However, later texts standardized the expression "ql" (which can be read as both "he said" and "say") in these texts to be read as "say" in many places.

== Etymology ==
While there are various proposed etymologies, one is that the word 'Quran' (قرآن) comes from the Arabic verb qaraʾa (قرء, 'to read') in the verbal noun pattern fuʿlān (فعلان), thus resulting in the meaning 'reading' or 'reading book'. Nine out of the ten imams of recitation have it read in their tradition with a hamza, as Qur'ān (قرآن), with only Ibn Kathir's tradition excluding the letter, reading it instead as Qurān (قران).

== Academic research ==
Some Western scholars have questioned the accuracy of traditional accounts regarding the compilation and codification of the sacred text—processes traditionally dated to the first decades of the 7th century—arguing that there is no evidence to suggest the text existed prior to the final decade of the 7th century. Meanwhile, non-Muslim sources from the earliest period of Islam conclude that non-Muslims show no awareness, in their writings, of a unique Muslim scripture until the 8th century, meaning that the Quran was not available or finalized until around that time. Some argue that it was a "cocktail of texts", some of which may have been existent a hundred years before Muhammad, that evolved (Gerd R. Puin), or was redacted (J. Wansbrough), to form the Quran. It is clearly evident that the arguments put forward in the final sentence largely overlap with the concept of Ahruf —a term found in traditional accounts, though its precise content and what it exactly refers to have never been fully established.

Some sections of the Quran, proven by archaeological evidence to have been written after the period in which it is said to have been revealed (anachronism), should point to a later writing date and possibly a nearby geographical location for those sections. Sources based on some archaeological data give the construction date of Masjid al-Haram, an architectural work mentioned 16 times in the Quran, as 78 AH an additional finding that sheds light on the evolutionary history of the Quranic texts mentioned, which is known to continue even during the time of Hajjaj, in a similar situation that can be seen with al-Aksa, though different suggestions have been put forward to explain. (Note: Arabic and Persian writers such as 10th-century geographer al-Muqaddasi, 11th-century scholar Nasir Khusraw, 12th-century geographer al-Idrisi and 15th-century Islamic scholar Mujir al-Din, as well as 19th-century North American and British Orientalist scholars such as Edward Robinson, Guy Le Strange, and Edward Henry Palmer explained that the term Masjid al-Aqsa refers to the entire esplanade plaza also known as the Temple Mount or Haram al-Sharif ('Noble Sanctuary')—i.e., the entire area including the Dome of the Rock, the fountains, the gates, and the four minarets—because none of these buildings existed at the time when the Quran was written.) These structures, expected to be somewhere near Muhammad, (Note: While "masjid" may simply be used as a place of worship, meaning a place of prostration traditionally used for worship, it may also refer to the buildings where these acts took place. In this case, the relevant verses could be dated after the construction of these buildings. Another verse alluding to Muhammad's Miraj story can be used to conclude that these two mosques are not that far apart. In this regard, one can consider the conclusions of scholars who point to Al-Aqsa being near Mecca —in the Al-Ji'rana region— or, conversely, the Revisionist school of Islamic studies, which suggests that the birth of Islam occurred in northwestern Arabia.) which were placed in cities like Mecca and Jerusalem, which are thousands of kilometers apart today, with interpretations based on narrations and miracles, were only a night walk away according to the outward and literal meaning of the verse.Surah Al-Isra 17:1

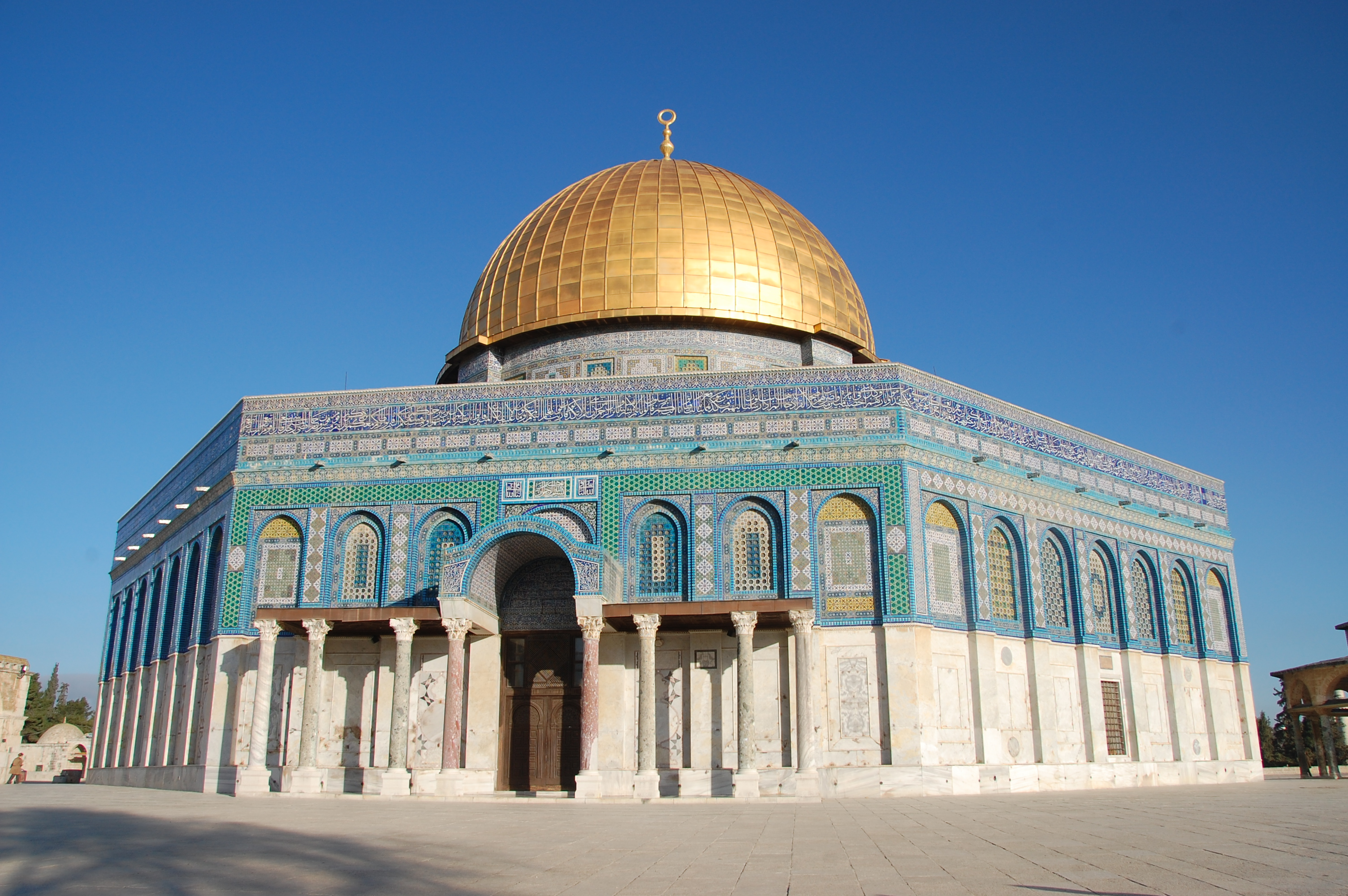
The Dome of the Rock in Jerusalem. The structure, the oldest extant example of early Islamic architecture, was completed in 691. It is notable for being the oldest structure with Islamic inscriptions, later associated with Muhammad's ascension.

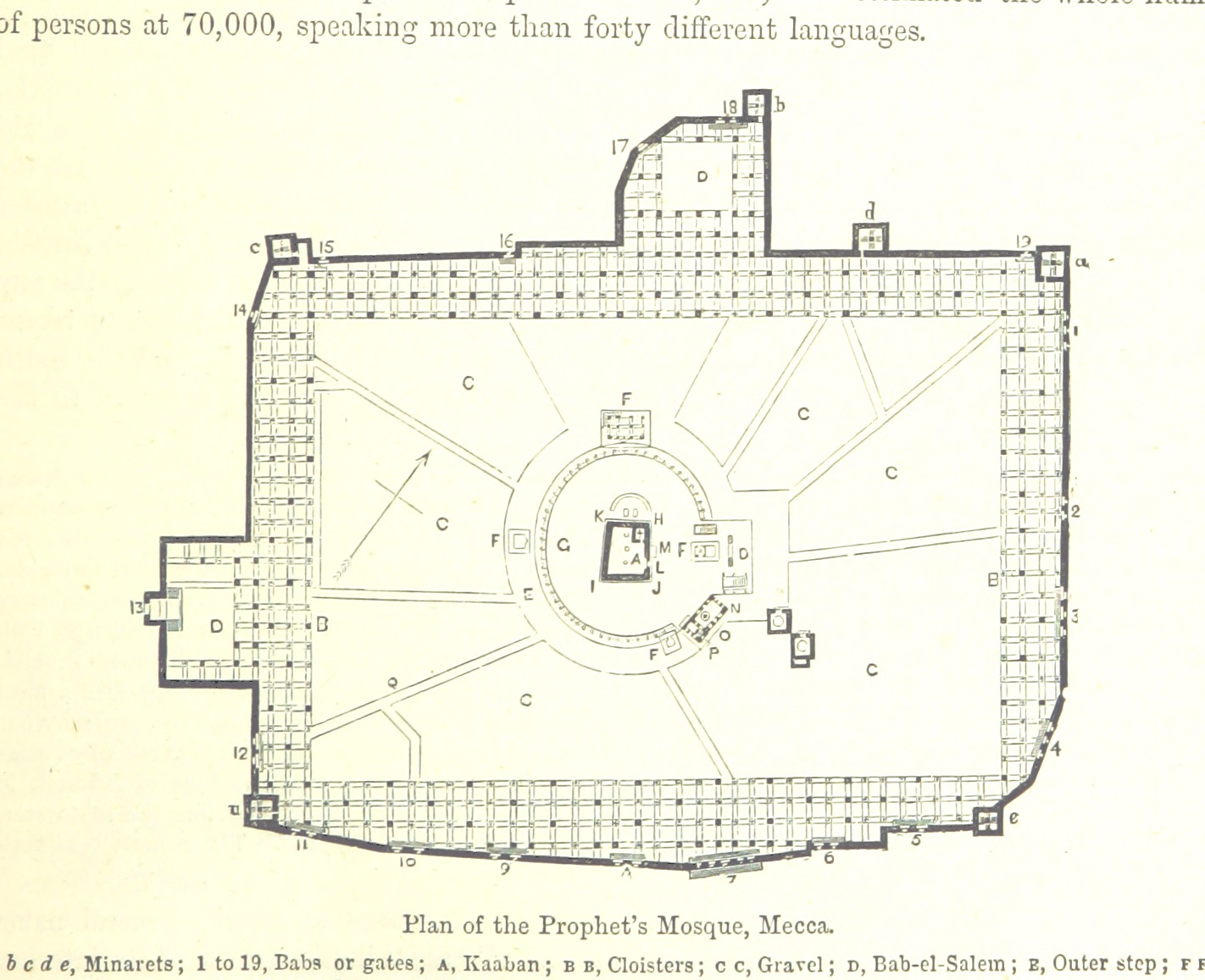
Plan of the Masjid al-Haram, 1884, The Sacred Mosque (Masjid al-Haram) is mentioned 16 times in the Quran, and an inscription from Taif provides the date of its construction as 78 AH. If we accept the existence of a single, well-known Masjid al-Haram and acknowledge that the inscription provides the date of its construction, it becomes possible to determine the earliest date at which the relevant verses could have entered the Quran.

A similar situation can be put forward for change of the Qibla (Quran 2:144) (Note: Traditional accounts tell of Jewish tribes being punished for their treachery—being driven into exile (the Banu Qaynuqa and Banu Nadir tribes) or massacred and "dumped into pits" (the Banu Qurayza tribe). Hadith tell that during the beginning of Muhammad's mission in Mecca, Muslims had prayed in the same direction the Jews did, towards Jerusalem, but that not long after the Muslims migrated to Medina, the direction (qibla) was changed to Mecca. However, no early documents say anything about these events.) and Mecca which casts doubt on its centrality within Islam, was not recorded as a pilgrimage center in any historical source before 741 (here the author places the region as "midway between Ur and Harran") rather than the Hejaz, and lacks pre-Islamic archaeological data. (Note: The first references to Mecca do not use locative expressions except for the Byzantine-Arab Chronicle or Chronicle of 741, though here the author places the region in Mesopotamia ("midway between Ur and Harran") rather than the Hejaz.) Cook and Crone in their work Hagarism argue that as the Arab conquerors shed their proto-Islamic Jewish and Christian allies (likely under the reign of Marwan I, d.685 CE), they also wanted to shed the multi-religious Levantine origins of the proto-Islamic movement. They did so by creating a mythology whereby the homeland of their religion was in Hijaz, far from its actual origin.

=== Canonization ===
The rise of the revisionist school of Islamic studies in the 1970s offered a new challenge to the conventional dating of the canonization of the Quran to the mid-7th century based on some hadith literature reporting that the task of canonization had been completed by the end of the reign of Uthman; by placing it in the late-7th century. Another characteristic of this hypothesis was that it largely refuted the traditionally held belief that the Quran was linked to Muhammad (or that it was the product of a series of revelations sent down to Muhammad).

The first to dispute the traditional date of canonization was John Wansbrough, who instead projected the event two centuries after the time of Muhammad. In their 1977 work Hagarism, Michael Cook and Patricia Crone originally argued that "there is no hard evidence for the existence of the Koran in any form before the last decade of the seventh century." Crone, however, subsequently revised some of her earlier views, stating in later writings that it is "difficult to doubt" that Muhammad uttered "all or most" of the Quran and that this is with "reasonable assurance". Stephen Shoemaker continues to hold that the Quran did not reach its final compilation until the reign of Abd al-Malik (685-705 CE); Abdul-Massih Saadi says; "References to the Quran (or "Islam" as a new religion) are absent from seventh-century Christian literature describing the early conquerors coming out of Arabia and their beliefs. (Note: Saadi did not examine the sources of Arab Mhaggraye because none have been found.) For example, when the Emir of the immigrants and Patriarch of the local Christians did have a religious colloquium there was much discussion of the scriptures but no mention of the Quran, which some have taken as an indication that the Quran had not been put into circulation. The Christians reported the Emir was accompanied by "learned Jews", that the immigrants "accepted the Torah just as the Jews and Samaritans", though none of the sources described the immigrants as Jews." According to their views —which are also supported by other methods in this field (such as linguistic analyses)— the geographical setting in which the Quran was composed is not the Hejaz region, but rather an area much further to the north, corresponding to the Jordan-Syria region historically referred to as "Arabia". (Note: Some of the locations suggested are Palestine (Jerusalem); the southern desert fringes of Palestine (Tom Holland); the northern Negev desert (Nevo and Koren), Northwest Arabia, south of Palestine (Crone). (Note: Petra, east of Palestine, (Another suggested location for the Quran and Muhammad in north-western Arabia (based on the Quran and later traditions is somewhere around Petra in Jordan.)) (Note: All these regions are either different descriptions of the same region or close to each other.))

=== Objections ===
Historians like Emran El-Badawi and Fred Donner have written rejoinders to arguments from the revisionist school, supporting a canonization date during the reign of Uthman. Although scarce, some seventh-century material evidence for the Quran exists, primarily from coins and inscriptions dating to the reign of Abd al-Malik ibn Marwan (685–705)—most notably at the Dome of the Rock—which include the Basmala, the Shahada, and Surat al-Ikhlas (Q 112) to assert the primacy of Islam over Christianity. Furthermore, Fred Donner has argued in favor of an early date for the Quran's compilation based on its absence of anachronisms from later political and sectarian conflicts.

Today, it is broadly accepted —even by some skeptical scholars— that a substantial core of the Quran goes back to Muhammad. Nevertheless, revisionist scholars like Stephen Shoemaker emphasize that the earliest surviving biography of Muhammad by Ibn Ishaq was written over a century after his death, pointing out that later Islamic narratives introduce increasingly detailed embellishments that are absent in earlier texts. Lawrence Conrad examines the early sirah books and sees that the dates of Muhammad's birth span a period of up to 85 years. Conrad defines this as: "the fluidity (evolutionary process in Sīrah) continued even in the written period."

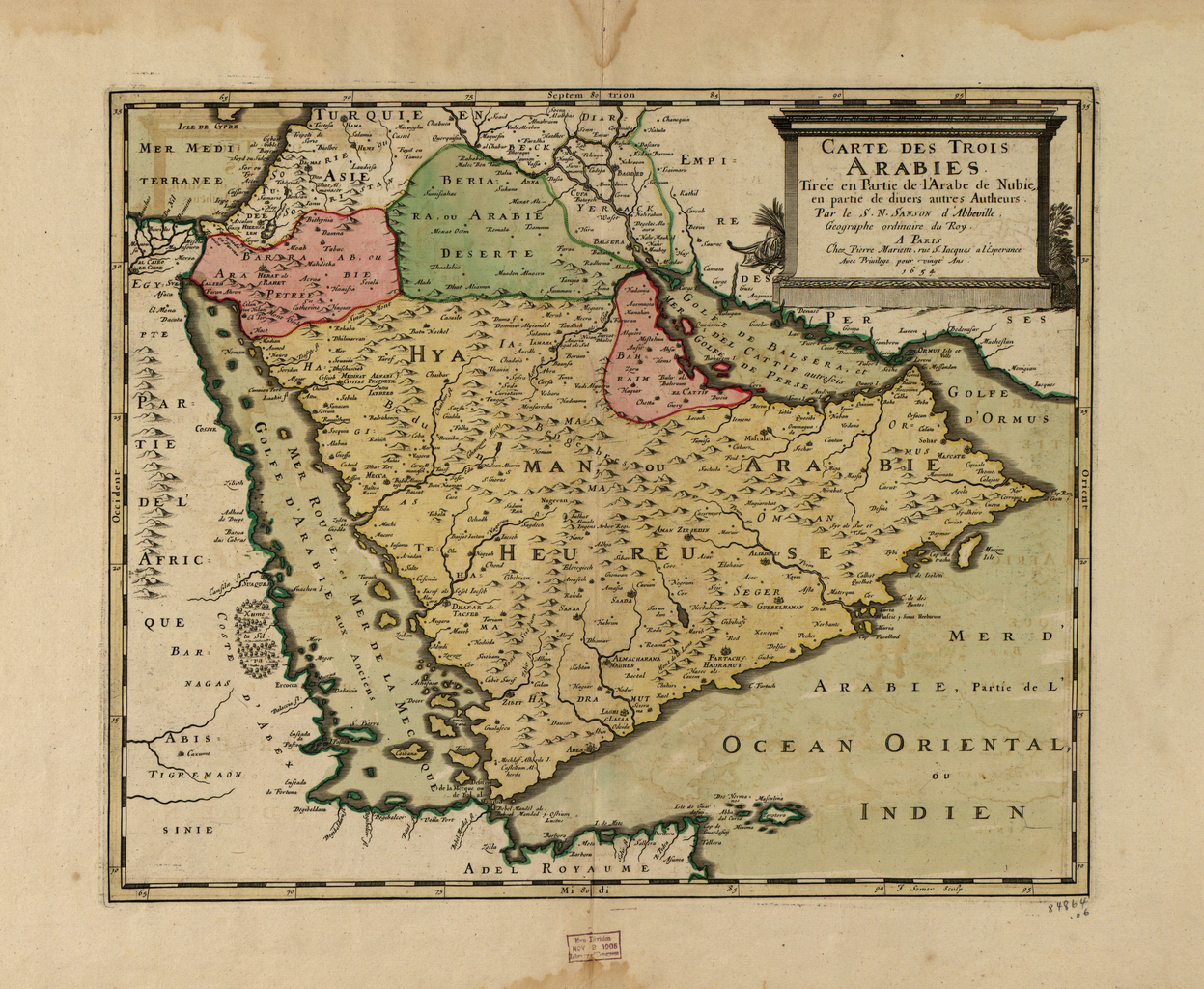
Carte des trois Arabies: Non-Islamic testimonies about Muhammad's life describe him as the leader of the Saracens, believed to be descendants of Ishmael, lived in the regions Arabia Petrae and Arabia Deserta in the north. According to some sources, Muhammad is not a name but a title.

== Traditional history of the Quran ==
According to the Islamic tradition, the revelation of the Quran to the Islamic prophet Muhammad began in 610 CE when the angel Gabriel (believed to have been sent by God) appeared to Muhammad (a trader in the Western Arabian city of Mecca, which had become a sanctuary for pagan deities and an important trading center) in the cave of Hira. The revelations started one night during the month of Ramadan in 610 CE, when Muhammad, at the age of forty, received the first visit from the angel Gabriel, reciting to him the first verses of Surah Al-Alaq. Muslims believe that Muhammad continued to have revelations until his death in 632 CE. The Quran uses the term ummi (أُمِّيّ) to describe Muhammad. The majority of Muslim scholars interpret this word as a reference to an illiterate individual, though some modern scholars instead interpret it as a reference to those who belong to a community without a scripture. (Note: According to the narration attributed to Muhammad's wife Khadija bint Khuwaylid by the hadith collector Bukhari, who lived 250 years after Muhammad, the story is as follows; Gabriel visited Muhammad and asked him to recite. Muhammad responded ma ana bīqāre'u, which could be translated into a number of ways: 'I do not read' or 'what am I to read/recite?' or 'I will not read/recite'. Gabriel pressed him "until all the strength went out of me; thereupon he released me and said: 'Read!'" This was repeated three times and upon the third, Gabriel released him and said, "Read in the name of the Sustainer who created humankind from a clot! Read! And your Sustainer is the most Beautiful." After this Muhammad continued to have revelations sporadically over a period of twenty-three years, until shortly before his death in 11/632. It was also reported that the experience was painful for Muhammad. "Never once did I receive a revelation without thinking that my soul had been torn away from me." "Sometimes it is revealed like the ringing of a bell. This form of inspiration is the hardest of them all and then it passes off after I have grasped what is inspired. Sometimes the Angel comes in the form of a man and talks to me and I grasp whatever he says.".)

The Quran emphasizes that Muhammad was required only to receive the sacred text and that he had no authority to change it. After Muhammad would receive revelations, he would later recite it to his Companions, who also memorized it or wrote it down. The practice of memorizing the whole Quran is still practised among Muslims. In the context of 7th-century Arabia, people had a penchant for recited poetry and competitions that featured the recitation of elaborate poetry were of great interest.

In Pre-Islamic Arabia, the society during the time of Muhammad was predominantly oral, and it is unknown whether the Quran was ever written and collected during the time of Muhammad. While writing was not a common skill during Muhammad's time, Mecca, being a commercial center, had a number of people who could write. Some scholars believe that several scribes including Zayd ibn Thabit and Ubay ibn Ka'b recorded verses of the Quran. This provides an explanation as to how the Quran existed in written form during the life of Muhammad, even if it was not compiled into one text. (See: Oral-formulaic composition)

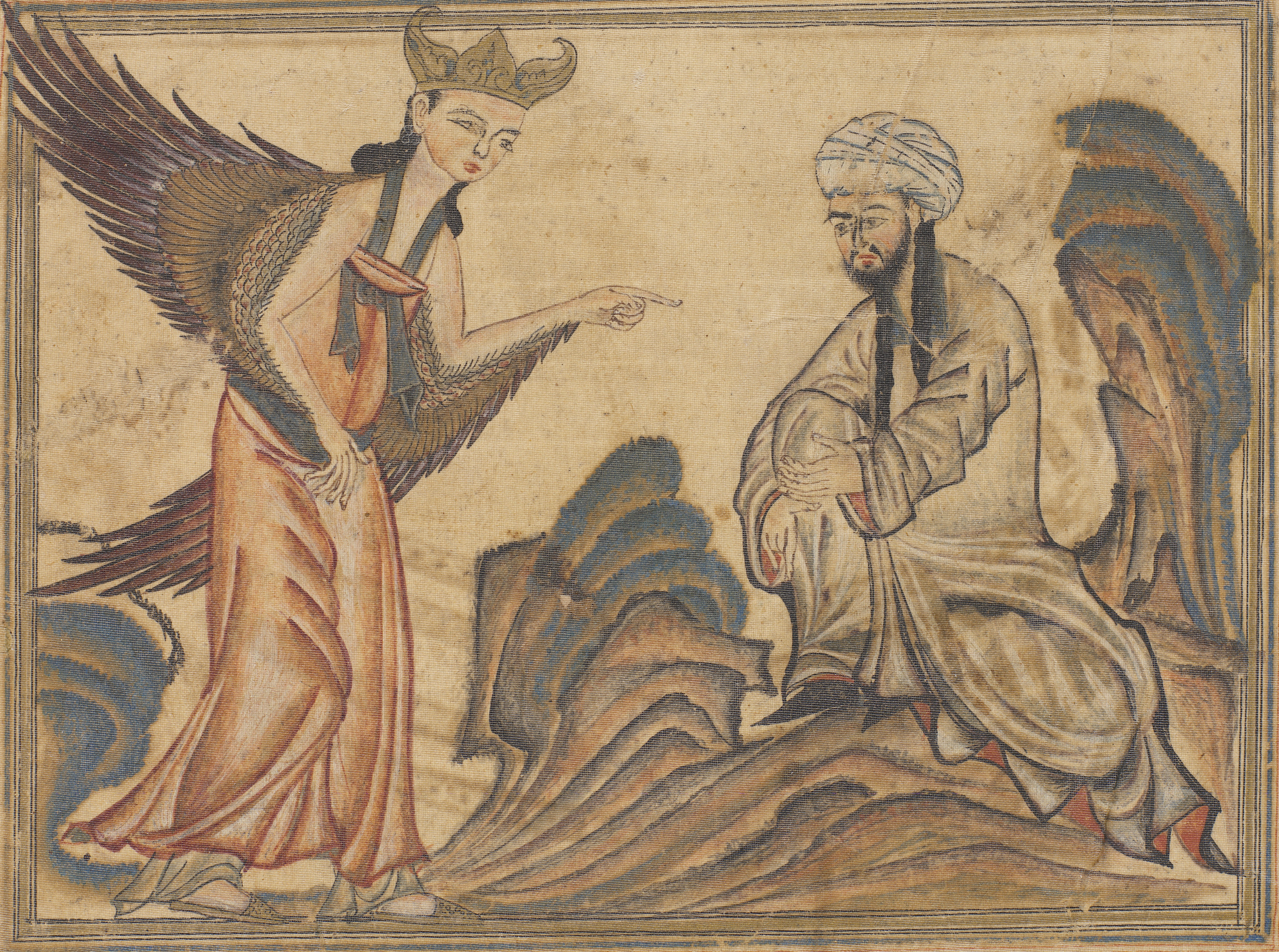
A depiction of Muhammad receiving his first revelation from the Angel Jibril (جِبْرِيل), illustrated in the Jami' al-tawarikh by the Persian historian Rashid al-Din Ṭabib (ca. 1306–1315)

Another story attributed to Ibn Abbas is this; "the prophet recited the book before Gabriel every year in the month of Ramadan, and in the month in which he died he recited it before him twice." The term 'recite', which is used here, is referring to the custom where a Quranic scholar recites the entire Quran from beginning to end a number of times before a senior scholar. According to this tradition the act of recital is being performed by Muhammad, with the angel Gabriel playing the role of superior authority. In one of the hadith Muhammad is recorded as saying: "I leave among you two things of high estimation: the Book of God and my Family." Some scholars argue that this provides evidence that the Quran had been collected and written during this time because it is not correct to call something al-kitab (book) when it is merely in the [people's] memories. The word al-kitab signifies a single and united entity and does not apply to a text which is scattered and not collected. However, Alan Jones has explored the use of this word in the Quran, finding that there is no evidence that it was used in such a "concrete sense" in reference to the Quran and other scriptures, but instead evidence points to an "abstract meaning". It can be accepted that the compilation of existing written material cannot be considered a complete text due to the expectation of additional revelation during Muhammad's lifetime, as well as Naskh accepted of by some scholars.

=== Abu Bakr ===
According to Sunni scholars, during the life of Muhammad parts of the Quran, though written, were scattered among his companions, much of it as private possession. According to Islamic sources after the Battle of Yamama in 633, when 70 Muslims who had memorized the Quran were killed, steps began to be taken to collate the body of material. The death of Salim Mawla Abi Hudhayfa was most significant, as he was one of the very few who had been entrusted by Muhammad to teach the Quran. Consequently, upon Umar's insistence, Abu Bakr ordered the collection of the hitherto scattered pieces of the Quran into one copy, assigning Zayd ibn Thabit, Muhammad's primary scribe, to gather the written fragments held by different members of the community. Ibn Thabit noted:

"So I started looking for the Holy quran and collected it from (what was written on) palm-leaf stalks, thin white stones, and also from men who knew it by heart, until I found the last verse of Surat at-Tauba (repentance) with Abi Khuzaima al-Ansari, and I did not find it with anybody other than him.

Ibn Hajar al-Asqalani draws special attention to Zayd's statement, "I found two verses of Sura al-Bara'a with Abu Khuzaima al-Ansari," as demonstrating that Zayd's own writings and memorization were not deemed sufficient. Everything required verification. The compilation was kept by the Caliph Abu Bakr, after his death by his successor, Caliph Umar, who on his deathbed gave them to Hafsa bint Umar, his daughter and one of Muhammad's widows.

=== Codexes and canonization ===
According to Islamic tradition, the process of canonization ended under the third caliph, Uthman ibn Affan (r. 23/644–35/655), about twenty years after the death of Muhammad in 650 CE, though the date is not exact because it was not recorded by early Arab annalists. The Quranic canon is the form of the Quran as recited and written in which it is religiously binding for the Muslim community. This canonical corpus is closed and fixed in the sense that nothing in the Quran can be changed or modified.

By the time of Uthman's caliphate, there was a perceived need for clarification of Quran reading. The Caliphate had grown considerably, expanding into Iraq, Syria, Egypt, and Iran, bringing into Islam's fold many new converts from various cultures with varying degrees of isolation.

It is believed that the general Hudhayfah ibn al-Yaman reported this problem to the caliph and asked him to establish a unified text. According to the history of al-Tabari, during the expedition there were 10,000 Kufan warriors, 6,000 in Azerbaijan and 4,000 at Rayy. A large number of soldiers disagreeing about the correct way of reciting the Quran may have caused Hudhayfah to promote a unified text. An example of the confusion at this time is seen during a campaign in Tabaristan, where one of the soldiers asked Hudhayfah, "How did the Messenger of God pray?" Hudhayfah told him the soldier prayed before fighting.

It is believed upon Hudhayfah's request Uthman obtained the sheets of the Quran from Ḥafṣa and appointed a commission consisting of Zayd and three prominent Meccans, and instructed them to copy the sheets into several volumes based on the dialect of Quraysh, the primary tribe of Mecca.

When the task was finished Uthman kept one copy in Medina and sent others to Kufa, Baṣra, Damascus, and, according to some accounts, Mecca, and ordered that all other variant copies of the Quran be destroyed. This was done everywhere except in Kufa, where some scholars argue that Ibn Masʿūd and his followers refused.

The above quoted hadith refers to the manuscripts of the Quran compiled during the time of Caliph Abu Bakr, which were inherited by Caliph Umar's daughter Hafsa, a wife of Muhammad, and then returned to her, as promised. Sean Anthony and Catherine Bronson note that "Zuhrī – the earliest known scholar to emphasize the importance of Ḥafṣah's codex for the collection of the caliph ʿUthmān's recension – also serves as the authority for the accounts of the destruction of Ḥafṣah's scrolls (ṣuḥuf)." After her death, he reported that Hafsa's brother inherited the manuscripts and allowed Uthman or according to some versions, Marwan I to destroy them.

It is generally accepted that the Uthmanic text comprises all 114 suras in the order known today.

Beliefs of some Shia Muslim scholars about the origins of the Quran may differ in some respects from Sunni beliefs. According to influential Marja' Abu al-Qasim al-Khoei, Uthman's collection of the Quran was metaphorical, not physical. He did not collect the verses and suras in one volume, but in the sense that he united the Muslims on the reading of one authoritative recension. al-Khoei also argues that the one reading on which Uthman united the Muslims was the one in circulation among most Muslims, and that it reached them through uninterrupted transmission from Muhammad.

This is one of the most contested issues and an area where many non-Muslim and Muslim scholars often clash.

==== Shia views on canonization ====
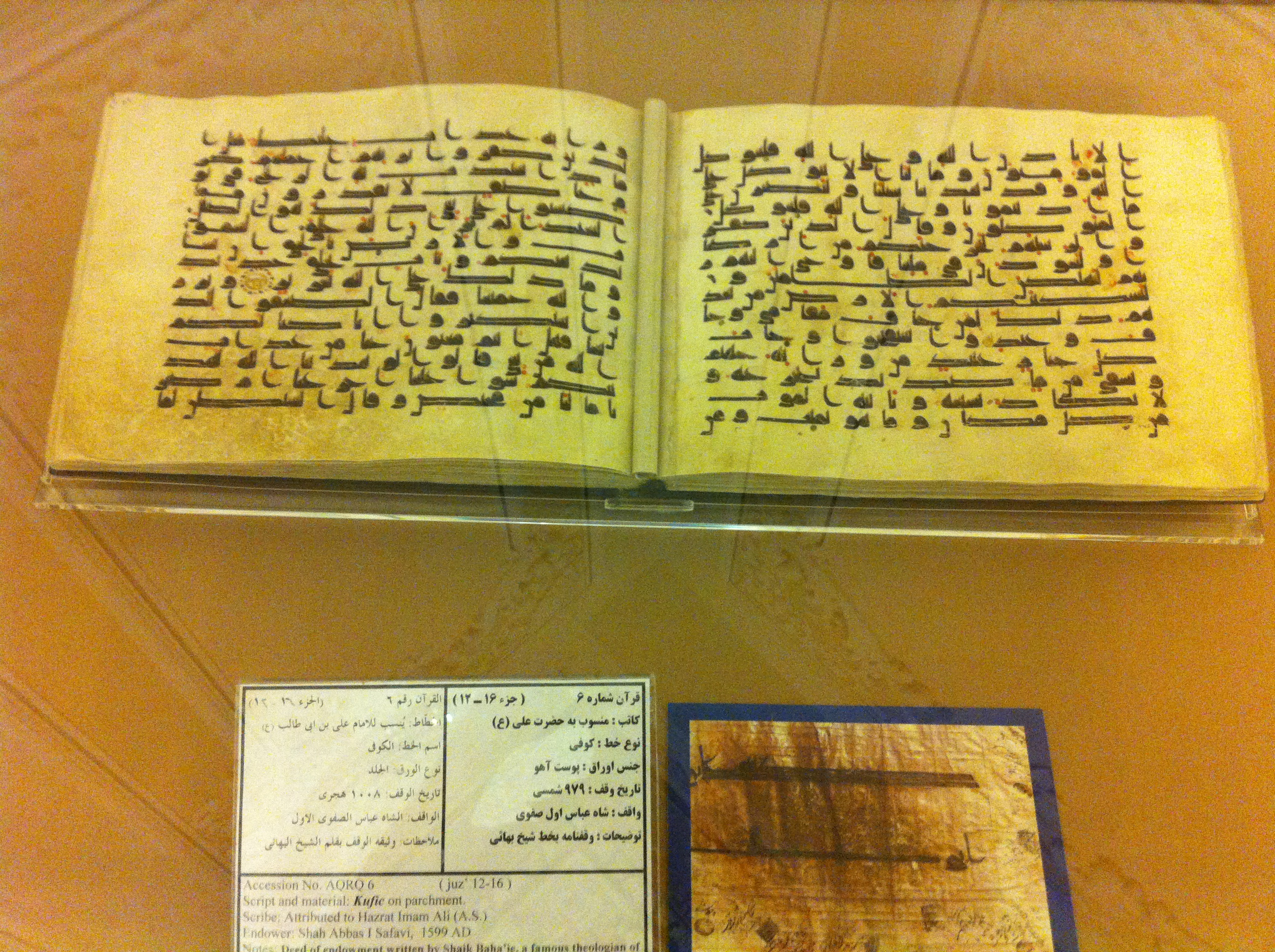
Quran − in Mashhad, Iran − said to be written by Ali.

Ali, the fourth Rashidun caliph (r. 656–661) and the first Shia Imam, is widely believed to have compiled his own transcript of the Quran. In particular, there are reports that Ali and some other companions of Muhammad collected the verses of the Quran during the lifetime of the prophet, while other reports emphasize that Ali prepared his codex immediately after the death of Muhammad in 632 CE. This latter group of reports may have been fabricated to imply consensus about the caliphate of Abu Bakr, that is, the preoccupation of Ali with his codex in these reports is intended to justify his widely rumored absence in the Saqifa meeting where Abu Bakr was elected caliph after Muhammad died.

In his codex, Ali may have arranged the verses in the order by which they were revealed to Muhammad, though this claim has been questioned by some. The codex of Ali may have also included additional information on the abrogated verses of the Quran. By some Shia accounts, Ali offered his codex for official use after the death of Muhammad but was turned down by some of the companions. Alternatively, Ali may have offered his codex for official use to Uthman during his caliphate but the caliph rejected it in favor of other variants available to him. As for its fate, it is believed in Twelver Shia that the codex of Ali has been handed down from every Imam to his successor, as part of the esoteric knowledge available to the Twelve Imams. In Twelver belief, the codex is now in the possession of their last Imam, Muhammad al-Mahdi, who is hidden from the public by divine will since 874, until his reappearance at the end of time to eradicate injustice and evil.

==== Differences with the Uthmanic codex ====
Some Sunni reports allege that the official Uthmanid codex of the Quran is incomplete, as detailed in Fada'il al-Qur'an by the Sunni exegete Abu Ubaid al-Qasim bin Salam (d. 838), among others. Supporting Ali's right to the caliphate after Muhammad, Shia polemists readily cited such reports to charge that explicit references to Ali had been removed by senior companions for political reasons. Yet the accusation that some words and verses were altered or omitted in the Uthmanid codex also appears in the Shia tradition. Among others, such reports can be found in Kitab al-Qira'at by the ninth-century Shia exegete Ahmad ibn Muhammad al-Sayyari, though he has been widely accused of connections to the Ghulat (lit. 'exaggerators' or 'extremists'). As the faithful recension of the Quran, the codex of Ali is thus said to have been longer than the official one, with explicit references to Ali. This view was apparently popular among Shia scholars before the Buyid dynasty (r. 934–1062). By contrast, any difference between the two codices is rejected by Sunnis because Ali did not impose his recension during his caliphate, while the Shia counterargument is that Ali deliberately remained silent about this divisive matter. Fearing persecution for themselves and their followers, later Twelver Imams may have also adopted religious dissimulation (taqiya) about this issue.

Alternatively, the recension of Ali may have matched the Uthmanic codex, save for the ordering of its content, but it was rejected for political reasons as it also included the partisan commentary of Ali, who is often counted among the foremost exegetes of the Quran. The implication that the Uthmanid codex is faithful has been the prevalent Shia view ever since the Buyids period. Some Shia scholars have thus questioned the authenticity of those traditions that allege textual differences with the Uthmanid codex, tracing them to the Ghulat, or to early Sunni traditions, while Sunnis have in turn blamed Shias for originating the falsification claims and accused them of espousing such views, often indiscriminately. Other Shia scholars have reinterpreted the traditions that may suggest the alteration of the Quran. For instance, a tradition ascribed to Ali suggests that a fourth of the Quran is about the House of Muhammad, or the Ahl al-Bayt, while another fourth is about their enemies. The Uthmanic codex certainly does not meet this description but the inconsistency can be explained by another Shia tradition, which states that the verses of the Quran about the virtuous are primarily directed at the Ahl al-Bayt, while those verses about the evildoers are directed first at their enemies.

=== Other codexes ===
Before Uthman established the canon of the Quran, there may have been different versions or codices in complete state, though none has yet been discovered. Such codices as may exist never gained general approval and were viewed by Muslims as individuals' personal copies. With respect to partial codices, there is opinion that "the search for variants in the partial versions extant before the Caliph Uthman's alleged recension in the 640s has not yielded any differences of great significance". The two most influential codices at this time are the codex of Ibn Mas'ud and the codex of Ubayy ibn Ka'b. Al-Qurazi recounted seeing the mushafs used by Ibn Mas'ud, Ubayy, and Zaid b. Thabit and finding no differences between them.

==== Codex of Ibn Mas'ud ====
The most influential of the allegedly varying codices was that of ʿAbdullah ibn Masʿud, an early convert who became a personal servant to Muhammad. It is reported that he learned around seventy suras directly from Muhammad, who appointed him as one of the first teachers of Quranic recitation. Later he was appointed to an administrative post in Kufa by the caliph ʿUmar, where he became a leading authority on the Quran and Sunnah. Some sources suggest that Ibn Masʿud refused to destroy his copy of the Quran or to stop teaching it when the ʿUthmanic codex was made official.

There are two points on which Ibn Masʿud's version is alleged to differ from the ʿUthmanic text: the order of the suras and some variants in the readings. Muhammad Mustafa Al-A'zami lists three reports concerning the omission of three suras, (Al-Fatiha and Al-Mu'awwidhatayn, the two short suras with which the Quran ends (Suras 113 and 114)), he then states that "early scholars such as al-Nawawi and Ibn Hazm denounced these reports as lies fathered upon Ibn Mas'ud." Most of the other differences involve only altered vowels with the same consonantal text, which caused variations in recitation. Ramon Harvey notes that Ibn Masʿūd's reading continued in use, and was even taught as the dominant reading in Kufa for at least a century after his death, in a paper discussing how some of his distinctive readings continued to play a role in Hanafi fiqh.

==== Codex of Ubayy ibn Ka'b ====
The second most influential codex was that of Ubay ibn Ka'b, a Medinan Muslim who served as a secretary for Muhammad. It is believed that he may have been more prominent as a Quranic specialist than Ibn Masʿud during Muḥammad's lifetime. There are reports that he was responsible for memorizing certain important revelations on legal matters, which from time to time Muhammad asked him to recite. In a few hadiths, Ubay is seen in a variety of roles. For instance, the "sheets" of Ubay are sometimes mentioned in some instances instead of those of Ḥafsa, and sometimes he is also mentioned in some hadiths instead of Zayd, dictating the Quran to scribes.

His version of the Quran is said to have included two short suras not in the Uthmanic or Ibn Masʿud texts: Sūrat al-Khal, with three verses, and Sūrat al-Ḥafd, with six. Sean Anthony has discussed the textual history of these two surahs in detail and noted that their presence in mushafs modelled after Ubayy's (and to a lesser extent, certain other companions) is "robustly represented in our earliest and best sources". While we lack material evidence in the form of manuscripts, he notes that many of the Muslim sources make direct material observations of the surahs in such mushafs. The order of suras in Ubayy's codex is said to have differed from that of Uthman's and Ibn Masʿud's as well, although these are structural differences rather than textual variations. The surah order of the lower text of the early seventh century Ṣanʽā’ 1 palimpsest is known to have similarities with that reported of Ubayy (and to a lesser extent, that of Ibn Mas'ud).

The first sura, entitled al-Khal ("separation"), is translated as: "O Allah, we seek your help and ask your forgiveness, and we praise you and we do not disbelieve in you. We separate from and leave him who sins against you."

The second sura, entitled al-Hafd ("haste"), is translated as: "O Allah, we worship You and to You we pray and prostrate and to You we run and hasten to serve You. We hope for Your mercy and we fear Your punishment. Your punishment will certainly reach the disbelievers." These two pieces are said to constitute qunut (that is, supplications which Muhammad sometimes made in morning prayer or in witr prayer after recitation of suras from the Quran). They are in fact identical to some parts of qunut reported in the collections of hadiths.

The single additional so-called aya is translated: "If the son of Adam were given a valley full of riches, he would wish a second one; and if he were given two valleys full of riches, he would surely ask for a third. Nothing will fill the belly of the son of Adam except dust, and Allah is forgiving to him who is repentant." This text is known to be a hadith from Muhammad. According to Ibn 'Abbas (No. 445) and 'Ubay (No. 446) this text was at times thought to be part of the Quran. However, Ubay himself clarifies that after sura 102: "I had been revealed, [the sahaba] did not consider the above to be part of the Quran."

This explanation of Ubay also makes it very clear that the companions of Mohammad did not differ at all about what was part of the Quran and what was not part of the Quran when the revelation had ceased. It is also important to note that the hadith appeared in the mushaf of Ubay because it was for his own personal use; that is, in his private notebook, where he did not always distinguish between Quranic material and hadith, since the notebook was not meant for public use and he himself knew well what to make of his own notes. All companions of Mohammad are said to have had their own copies of the Quran, with notes, for personal use.

The Islamic reports of these copies of the Quran of the companions of Mohammad only tell of various differences according to reports that reached them (e.g., the hadith in Bukhari, VIII, No. 446, that Ubay at some early stage held this sentence to be part of the Quran). However, the tangible manuscripts of these copies of the Quran have not survived but were destroyed, having been considered obsolete.

== Manuscripts ==
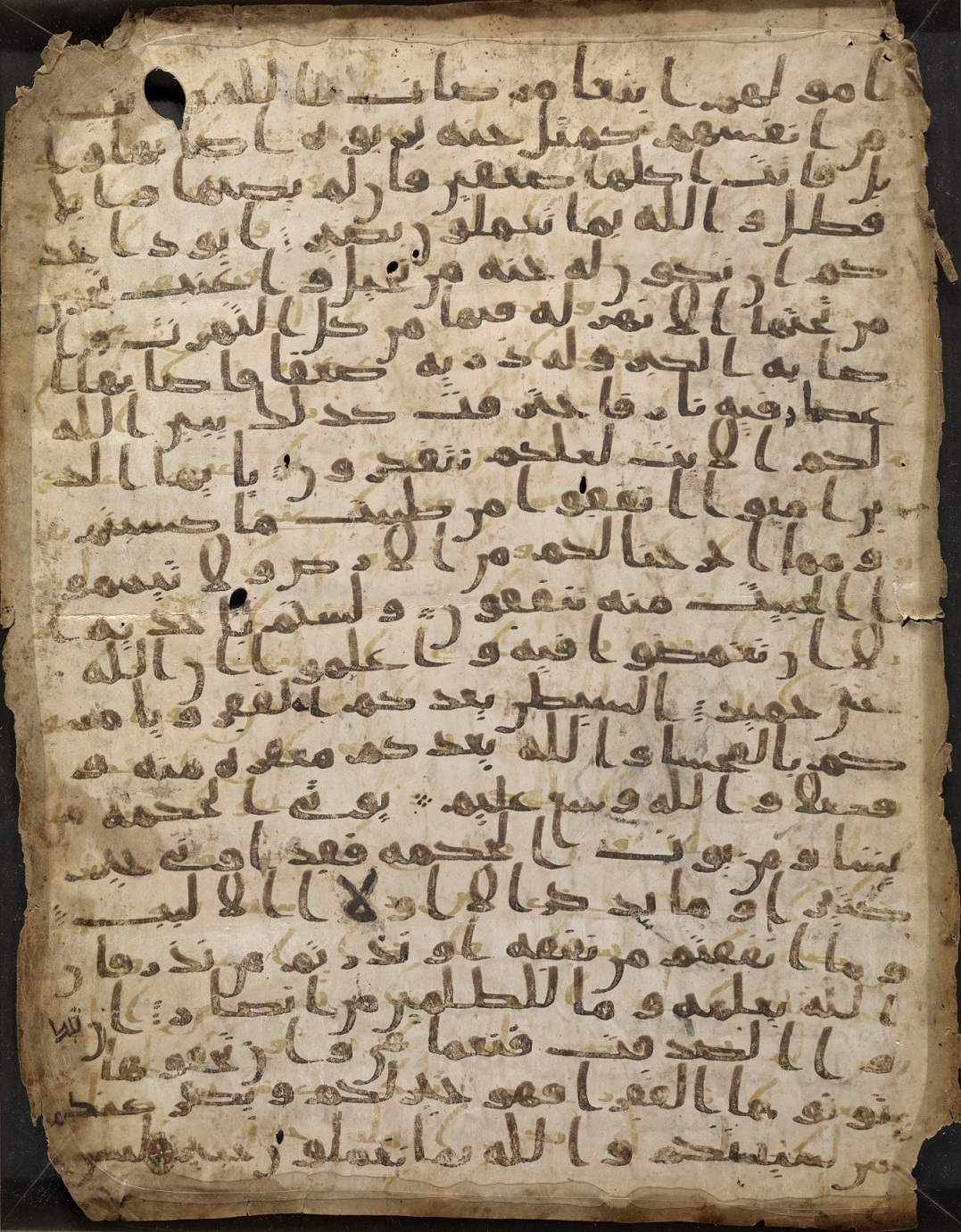
The right page of the Stanford '07 binary manuscript. The upper layer is the verses 265–271 of the surah Bakara. The double layer reveals the additions made on the first text of the Quran and the differences with today's Koran.

In the 20th century, the Sanaa manuscript was discovered. It has been radiocarbon dated to the range 578-669 CE with 95% confidence. The manuscript is a palimpsest with quranic verses in both upper and lower texts. The upper text has exactly the same verses and the same order of suras and verses as the standard Quran. The order of the suras in the lower text of the Sana'a codex is different from the order in the standard Quran. In addition, the lower text exhibits extensive variations from the counterpart text in the standard Quran; such that the lower text represents the only surviving early quranic manuscript that does not conform to the 'Uthmanic tradition. The majority of these variations add words and phrases, so as to emphasize or clarify the standard quranic reading. Some scholars have proposed parallels for these variations in reports of variants in 'companion codices' that were kept by individual companions to the Prophet outside of the mainstream tradition of 'Uthman; but these correspondences are much the minority. François Déroche proposes, on palaeographic grounds, a date for the lower text in the second half of the first century AH (hence 672 – 722 CE) and summarises the character of the Sana'a Palimpsest, "The scriptio inferior of the Codex Ṣanʿāʾ I has been transcribed in a milieu which adhered to a text of the Qurʾan different from the ʿUthmanic tradition as well as from the Qurʾanic codices of Ibn Masʿūd and Ubayy".

=== Textual criticism and manuscripts ===
A number of important manuscript discoveries have also played a role in supporting the traditional date of the canonization of the Quran. Partial Quranic manuscripts such as the Sanaa manuscript and the Birmingham Quran manuscript have been discovered and radiocarbon dated to the seventh century. With the discovery of earlier manuscripts which conform to the Uthmanic standard, the revisionist view fell out of favor and has been described as "untenable", with western scholarship generally supporting the traditional date.

The discovery of the Sanaa manuscript occurred in 1972, during the restoration of the Great Mosque of San'a in Yemen headed by Gerd R. Puin. Puin noted unconventional verse orderings, minor textual variations, and rare styles of orthography in the manuscript. Puin believed that this implied an evolving text as opposed to a fixed one.

Another case is that of the Birmingham manuscript, which, in 2015, was dated between 568 and 645 with 95.4% accuracy. François Déroche, however, expressed reservations about the reliability of the radiocarbon dates proposed for the Birmingham leaves, noting instances elsewhere in which radiocarbon dating had proved inaccurate in testing Qurans with an explicit endowment date. Mustafa Shah has suggested that the grammatical marks and verse separators in the Birmingham leaves are inconsistent with the proposed earlier range of the proposed radiocarbon dates. Joseph Lumbard has speculated that a palimpsest may occur below the text of the Birmingham manuscript, offering a potentially even earlier text, but more recent ultraviolet testing of the leaves has ruled out this possibility. Likewise, recent work on the orthography of Quranic manuscripts has demonstrated that all early manuscripts, excluding the Sanaa manuscript, descend from a common Uthmanic archetype, and so cannot predate it.

Keith Small, in Textual Criticism and Qurʼān Manuscripts, has concluded that it is not possible to develop a reliable critical text of the Quran based on the sources currently available. The Corpus Coranicum project is an ongoing effort to develop a critical edition of the Quran.

=== Manuscript styles ===
The Arabic script as we know it today was unknown in Muhammad's time (as Arabic writing styles have progressed through time) and the Quran was preserved through memorization and written references on different materials. As Arab society started to evolve into using writing more regularly, writing skills evolved accordingly. Early Quranic Arabic was written in a rasm which lacked precision because distinguishing between consonants was impossible due to the absence of diacritical marks (a'jam). Vowelling marks (tashkil) to indicate prolongation or vowels were absent as well. Due to this there were endless possibilities for the mispronunciation of the word. The Arabic script as we know it today, the scripta plena, which has pointed texts and is fully vowelled was not perfected until the middle of the 9th century.

==== Umayyad Period (44/661–132/750) – Hijazi script ====
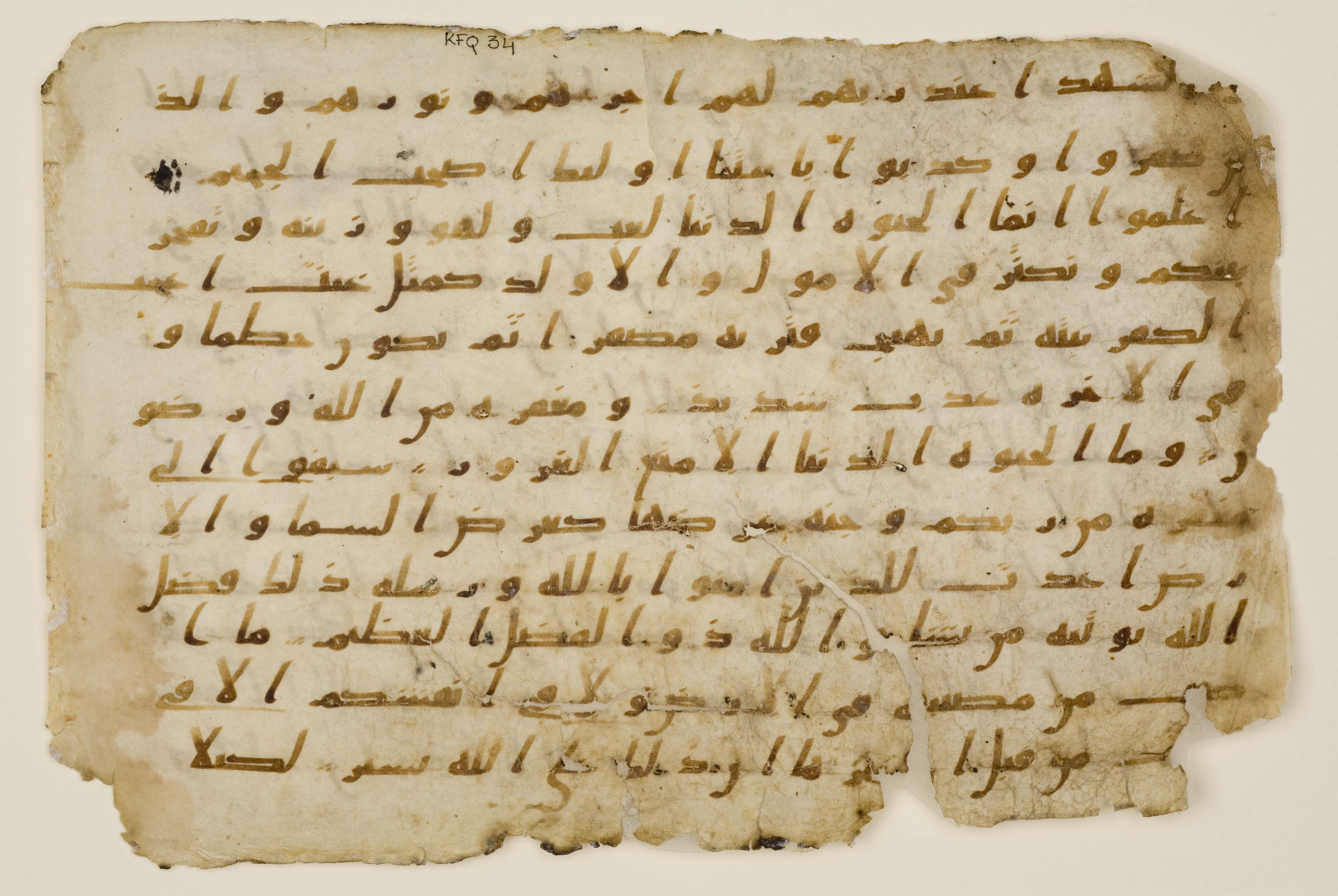
Single folio from an early 8th century Quran, Khalili Collection of Islamic Art

The earliest known manuscripts of the Quran are collectively called the Hijazi script, and are mostly associated with the Umayyad period.

Most of the fundamental reform to the manuscripts of the Quran took place under Abd al-Malik, the fifth Umayyad caliph (65/685–86/705). Under Abd al-Malik's reign, Abu'l Aswad al-Du'ali (died 688) founded the Arabic grammar and invented the system of placing large coloured dots to indicate the tashkil. The Umayyad governor al-Hajjaj ibn Yusuf al-Thaqafi later enforced this system.

During this time the construction of the Dome of the Rock in Jerusalem in 72/691–92 was done, which was complete with Quranic inscriptions. The inscriptions on the Dome of the Rock in fact represent the earliest known dated passages from the Quran. In these inscriptions, many letters are already provided with diacritical points.

The earliest codices of the Quran found in the Umayyad period were most likely made in single volumes, which can be determined from the large fragments that have survived. Also during this time, the format of the codex went from being vertical to horizontal in the 8th century. It is believed this change to horizontal formats and thick/heavy-looking scripts may have been done to show the superiority of the Quran and to distinguish the Islamic tradition from the Jewish and Christian ones, who used vertical formats for their scriptures.

During this time, there was a diversity of styles in which the Quran was written. One characteristic seen in most of these manuscripts is the elongated shafts of the free-standing alif and the right-sided tail (foot) of the isolated alif. Also, these manuscripts do not have headings of chapters (suras). Instead, a blank space is left at the end of one sura and at the beginning of another.

==== Abbasid Period (132/750–640/1258) ====
===== Early Abbasid Style =====
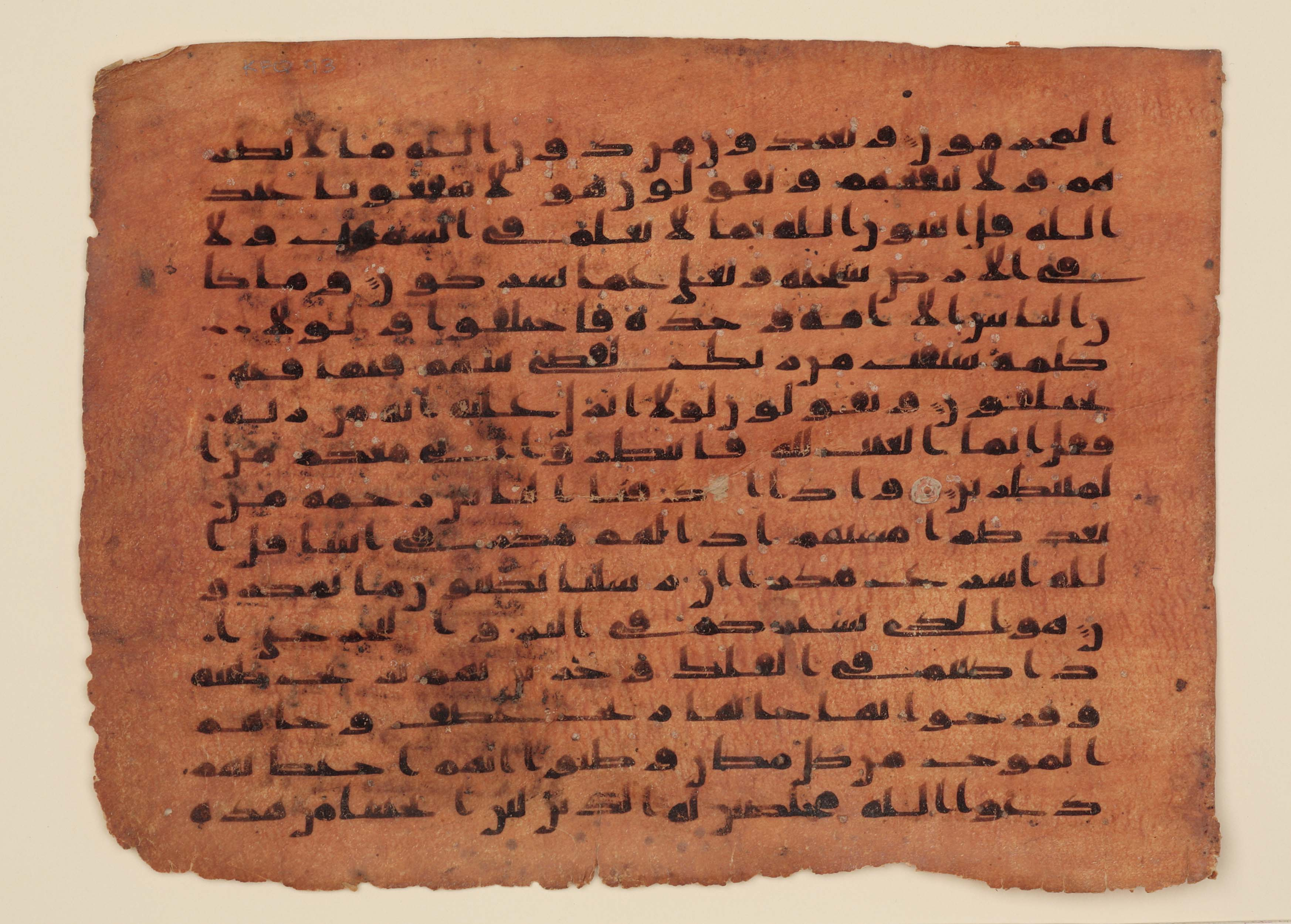
Folio from a late 8th century Quran in early Abbasid style

Unlike the manuscripts from the Umayyad Dynasty, many of the early Abbasid manuscripts were copied in a number of volumes. This is evident from the large scripts used and the smaller number of lines per page. Early Quranic manuscripts provide evidence for the history of the Quranic text and their formal features tell us something about the way art and its deeper meaning were perceived in the classical age of Islam. Both its script and layout turned out to be constructed according to elaborate geometrical and proportional rules.

The main characteristic of these scripts was their writing style. The letters in most of these manuscripts are heavy-looking, relatively short and horizontally elongated. The slanted isolated form of the alif that was present in the Umayyad period completely disappeared and was replaced by a straight shaft with a pronounced right-sided foot, set at a considerable distance from the following letter. Also, unlike the Hijazi scripts, these are often richly illuminated in gold and other colours. Another difference is that sura headings are clearly marked and enclosed in rectangular panels with marginal vignettes or palmettes protruding into the outer margins. These Qurans of the early Abbasid period were also bound in wooden boards, structured like a box enclosed on all sides with a movable upper cover that was fastened to the rest of the structure with leather thongs.

===== New Abbasid Style =====
The New Abbasid Style (NS) began at the end of the 9th century C.E. and was used for copying the Quran until the 12th centuries, and maybe even as late as the 13th century. Unlike manuscripts copied in Early Abbasid scripts, NS manuscripts had vertical formats.

During this time, Al-Khalil ibn Ahmad al-Farahidi (died 786) devised a tashkil system to replace that of Abu al-Aswad. His system has been universally used since the early 11th century, and includes six diacritical marks: fatha (a), damma (u), kasra (i), sukun (vowel-less), shadda (double consonant), madda (vowel prolongation; applied to the alif).

Another central figure during this time was Abu Bakr b. Mujāhid (died 324/936). His goal was to restrict the number of reliable readings and accept only those based on a fairly uniform consonantal text. He chose seven well-known Quran teachers of the 2nd/8th century and declared that their readings all had divine authority, which the others lacked. He based this on the popular ḥadith in which Muhammad says the Quran was revealed to him in "seven aḥruf". During this time there was strong Quranic traditions in Kufa, Baṣra, Medina, Damascus, and Mecca. Due to this, Ibn Mujāhid selected one reading each for Medina, Mecca, Baṣra, and Damascus – those of Nafi‘ (died 169/785), Ibn Kathir (died 120/737), Abu ʿAmr (died 154/770), and IbnʿAmir (died 118/736), respectively – and three for Kūfa, those of ʿAsim (died 127/744), Ḥamza (died 156/772), and al-Kisaʾi (died 189/804). His attempt to limit the number of canonical readings to seven was not acceptable to all, and there was strong support for alternative readings in most of the five cities. In the present day the most common reading that is in general use is that of 'Aasim al-Kufi through Hafs.

The 11th-century eastern Quranic manuscript contains the 20th juz' (section) of a Quran that originally consisted of 30 parts. The arrangement into 30 parts corresponds to the number of days in the month of Ramadan. Other sections or fragments of this magnificent manuscript lie scattered in various collections all over the world. A Turkish note ascribes the Quran to the hand of the Caliph Ali, Muhammad's cousin and son-in-law, and thus demonstrates the high significance of this manuscript. The text is written in Eastern Kufic, a monumental script that was developed in Iran in the late 10th century. The writing and the illumination of the manuscript bear witness to the great artistic skills of the calligrapher and the illustrator. The manuscript is at the Bavarian State Library in Munich, Germany. Out of seven complete or nearly complete semi-Kufic Qurans from before the end of the eleventh century, four contain a verse count. Although a small sample, it does suggest that the use of a verse count was a prevalent and quite deeply rooted practice in semi-Kufic Qurans between ca. 950 and ca. 1100.

Abu Ali Muhammad ibn Muqla (died 940), an accomplished calligrapher from Baghdad, was also a prominent figure at this time. He became vizir to three Abbasid caliphs and is credited with developing the first script to obey strict proportional rules. Ibn Muqla's system was used in the development and standardization of the Quranic script, and his calligraphic work became the standard way of writing the Quran. However it was later perfected by Ibn al-Bawwab (d. 1022), the master calligrapher who continued Muqla's tradition. Muqla's system became one of the most popular styles for transcribing Arabic manuscripts in general, being favoured for its legibility. The eleventh century Quran is one of the earliest dated manuscripts in this style.

This "new style" is defined by breaks and angular forms and by extreme contrasts between the thick and thin strokes. The script was initially used in administrative and legal documents, but then it replaced earlier Quranic scripts. It is possible that it was easier to read than the early 'Abbasid scripts, which differ greatly from current writing. Economic factors may also have played a part because while the "new style" was being introduced, paper was also beginning to spread throughout the Muslim world, and the decrease in the price of books triggered by the introduction of this new material seems to have led to an increase in its demand. The "new style" was the last script to spread throughout the Muslim world before the introduction of printing. It remained in use until the 13th century, at which point it was restricted to titles only.

== 1924 Cairo edition ==
The influential standard Quran of Cairo ("1342 Cairo text" using the Islamic calendar) is the Quran that was used throughout almost all the Muslim world until the Saudi Quran of 1985. The Egyptian edition is based on the "Ḥafṣ" version ("qira'at") based on ʻAsim's recitation, the 8th-century recitation of Kufa. It uses a set of additional symbols and an elaborate system of modified vowel-signs and for minute details, not identical to any older system. The Cairo edition has become the standard for modern printings of the Quran with the exception of those used in all North Africa (excluding Egypt) where the Warsh version is used.

A committee of leading professors from Al-Azhar University had started work on the project in 1907 but it was not until 10 July 1924 that the "Cairo Quran" was first published by Amiri Press under the patronage of Fuad I of Egypt, as such, it is sometimes known as the "royal (amīriyya) edition." The goal of the government of the newly formed Kingdom of Egypt was not to delegitimize the other qir’at, but to eliminate that, which the colophon labels as errors, found in Qur’anic texts used in state schools. To do this they chose to preserve one of the fourteen Qira'at "readings", namely that of Hafs (d. 180/796), student of ‘Asim. Its publication has been called a "terrific success", and the edition has been described as one "now widely seen as the official text of the Quran", of the 1924 Cairo version. Minor amendments were made later in 1924 and in 1936 – the "Faruq edition" in honour of then ruler, King Faruq.

Reasons given for the overwhelming popularity of Hafs and Asim range from the fact that it is easy to recite, to the simple statement that "God has chosen it". Ingrid Mattson credits mass-produced printing press mushafs with increasing the availability of the written Quran but also diminishing the diversity of qira'at. Written text has become canonical and oral recitation has lost much of its previous equality.

Muslim disagreement over whether to include the Basmala within the Quranic text, reached consensus following the 1924 Edition, which included it as the first verse (āyah) of Quran chapter 1 but otherwise included it as an unnumbered line of text preceding the other 112 chapters, with the exclusion of Quran chapter 9. The Cairo Quran adopted the Kufan tradition of separating and numbering verses, and thus standardized a different verse numbering to Flügel's 1834 edition. It adopted the chronological order of chapters attributed to Ibn Abbās, which became widely accepted following 1924. A large number of pre-1924 Qurans were destroyed by dumping them in the river Nile.

Prominent committee members included Islamic scholar, Muhammad b. ‘Ali al-Husayni al-Haddad, Egypt's senior Quran Reader (Shaykh al-Maqâri). Noteworthy Western scholars/academics working in Egypt during the era include Bergsträsser and Jeffery. Methodological differences aside, speculation alludes to a spirit of cooperation. Bergsträsser was certainly impressed with the work.

== Views on integrity ==
Muslims believe that the Quran, as it is presented today, is complete and untouched, supported by their faith in Quranic verses such as "We [Allah] have, without doubt, sent down the Reminder [the Quran]; and We will assuredly guard it [from corruption]".

However, some Sunni literature contains reports that suggest that some of the revelations had already been lost before the collection of the Quran initiated by Abu Bakr. In one report, 'Umar was once looking for the text of a specific verse of the Quran on stoning as a punishment for adultery, which he remembered. Later, he discovered that the only person who had any record of that verse had been killed in the battle of Yamama and as a result the verse was lost. Some of the Companions recalled that same verse, one person being 'A'isha, Muhammad's youngest wife. She is believed to have said that a sheet on which two verses, including the one on stoning, were under her bedding and that after Muhammad died, a domestic animal got into the room and ate the sheet. Experts on hadith literature have rejected this hadith, as all routes of transmission either contain narrators charged with dishonesty in disclosing sources or simply conflict with the majority version of the report, which all have authentic routes of transmission but omit the part about the piece of paper being eaten.

Certain Shia scholars state that Ali's predecessors wilfully excluded all references to the right of Ali to be the caliph after Muhammad died. Some Shias questioned the integrity of the Uthmanic codex, stating that two surahs, "al-Nurayn" (The Two Lights) and "al-Walayah" (the Guardianship), which dealt with the virtues of Muhammad's family, were removed.

Al-Khoei addresses this issue and argues for the authenticity and completeness of the Quran on the basis that it was compiled during the lifetime of Muhammad. His argument is based on hadiths and on critically analysing the situation during and after the life of Muhammad. He states that the collection of the Quran by Abu Bakr, Umar, and Uthman occurred significantly after the caliphate was decided, and so if Ali's rule had been mentioned, there would have been no need for the Muslims to gather to appoint someone. The fact that none of the Companions mentioned this supposed alteration, either at the beginning of the caliphate or after Ali became caliph, is regarded as proof that this alteration did not occur.

Al-Khoei also argues that by the time 'Uthman became caliph, Islam had spread to such an extent that it was impossible for anyone to remove anything from the Quran. Uthman could have altered the text but he would have been unable to convince all those who had memorized the Quran to go along with his alterations. Any such alteration also would have been mentioned by Uthman's political opponents and assassins yet none accused him of this. Finally, he argues that if Uthman had altered the Quran, Ali would have restored it to its original state upon the death of Uthman, especially if verses of his rule had been removed. Instead Ali is seen promoting the Quran during his reign, which is evidence that there was no alteration.

== See also ==
- Christian influences on the Islamic world
- Corpus Coranicum
- Early Quranic manuscripts
- Biblical and Quranic narratives
- Prophets and messengers in Islam
- Qisas Al-Anbiya
- Criticism of the Quran
- Bazargan chronology
- History of Islam
