= Bulaq Press =

Egyptian printing press

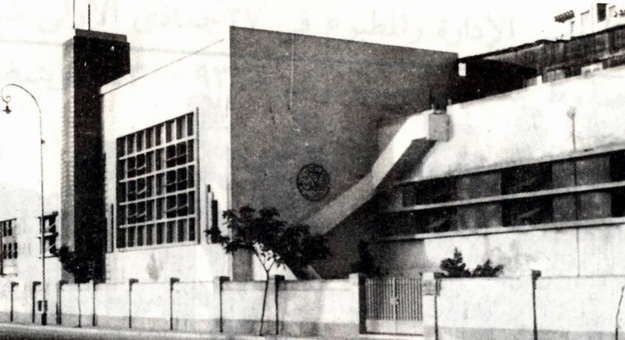
The Amiri Press building in Bulaq.

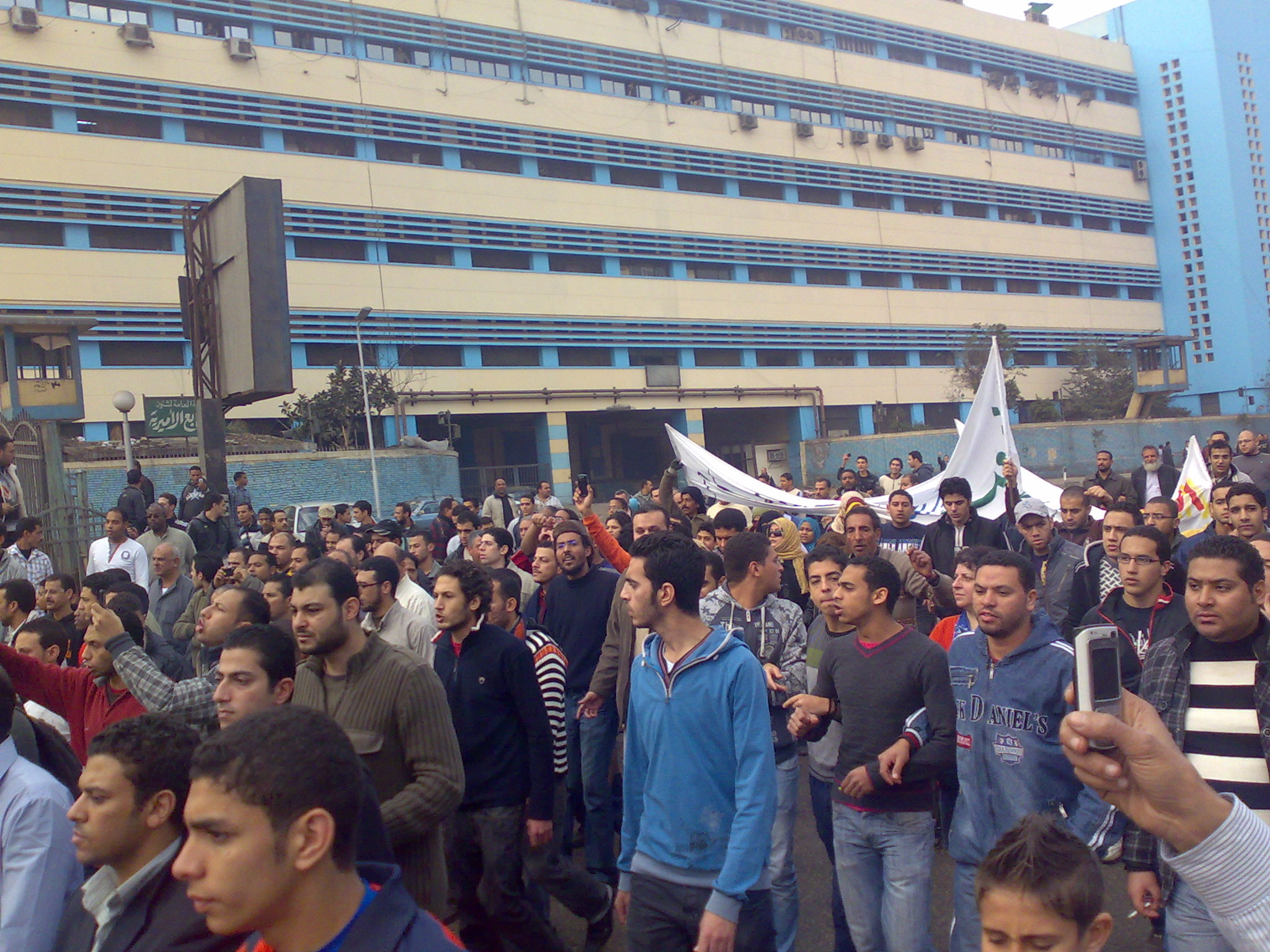
The Amiria Press Authority building in Imbaba in 2011.

The Amiri Press or Amiriya Press (Arabic: المطبعة الأميرية, المطابع الأميرية) (Al-Matba'a al-Amiriya) (also known as the Bulaq Press (مطبعة بولاق) due to its original location in Bulaq) is a printing press, and one of the main agencies with which Muhammad Ali Pasha modernized Egypt. The Amiri Press had a profound effect on Egyptian literature and intellectual life in the country and in the greater region, as scientific works in European languages were translated into Arabic.

== History ==
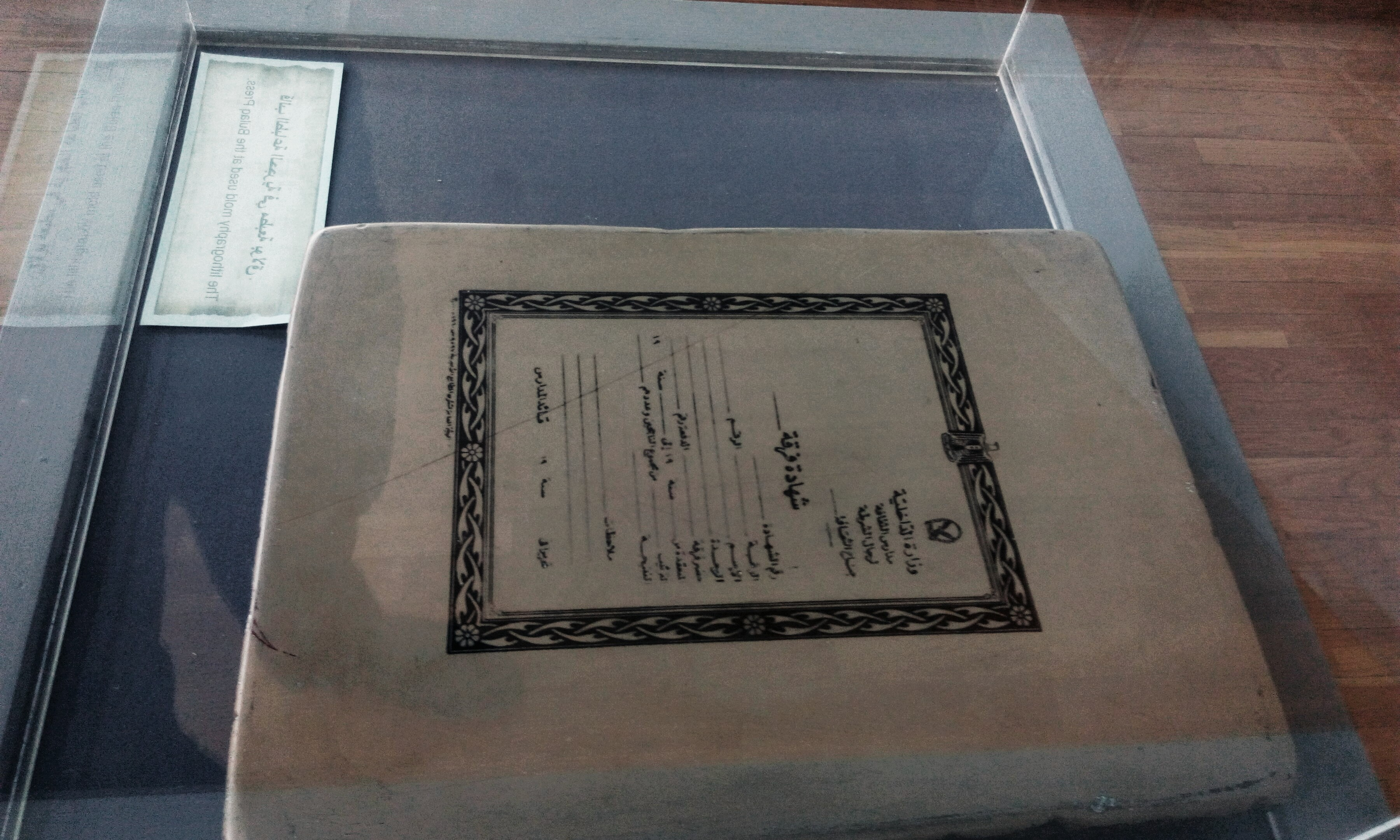
A lithography stamp at the Bulaq Press.

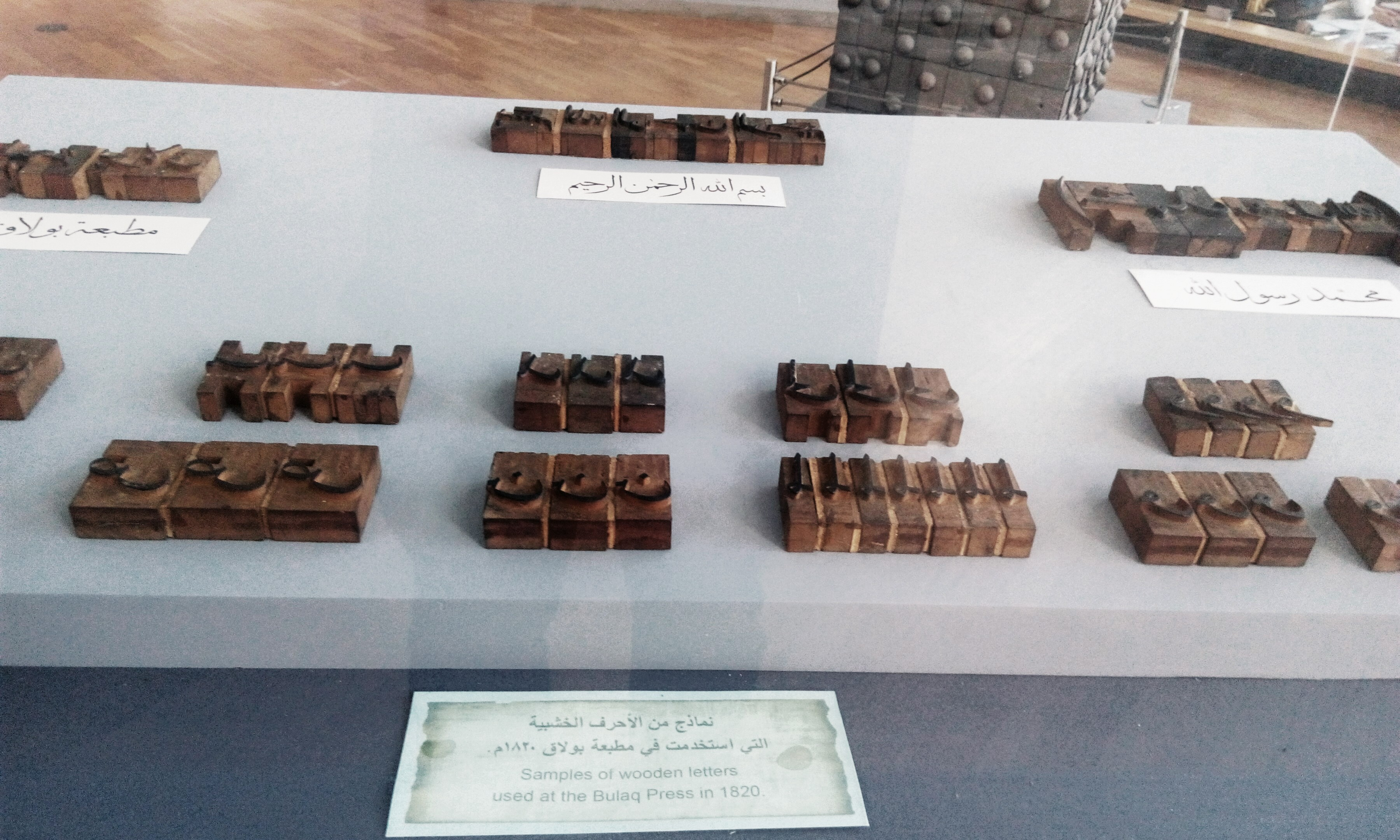
Wooden letter blocks used at the Bulaq Press in 1820.

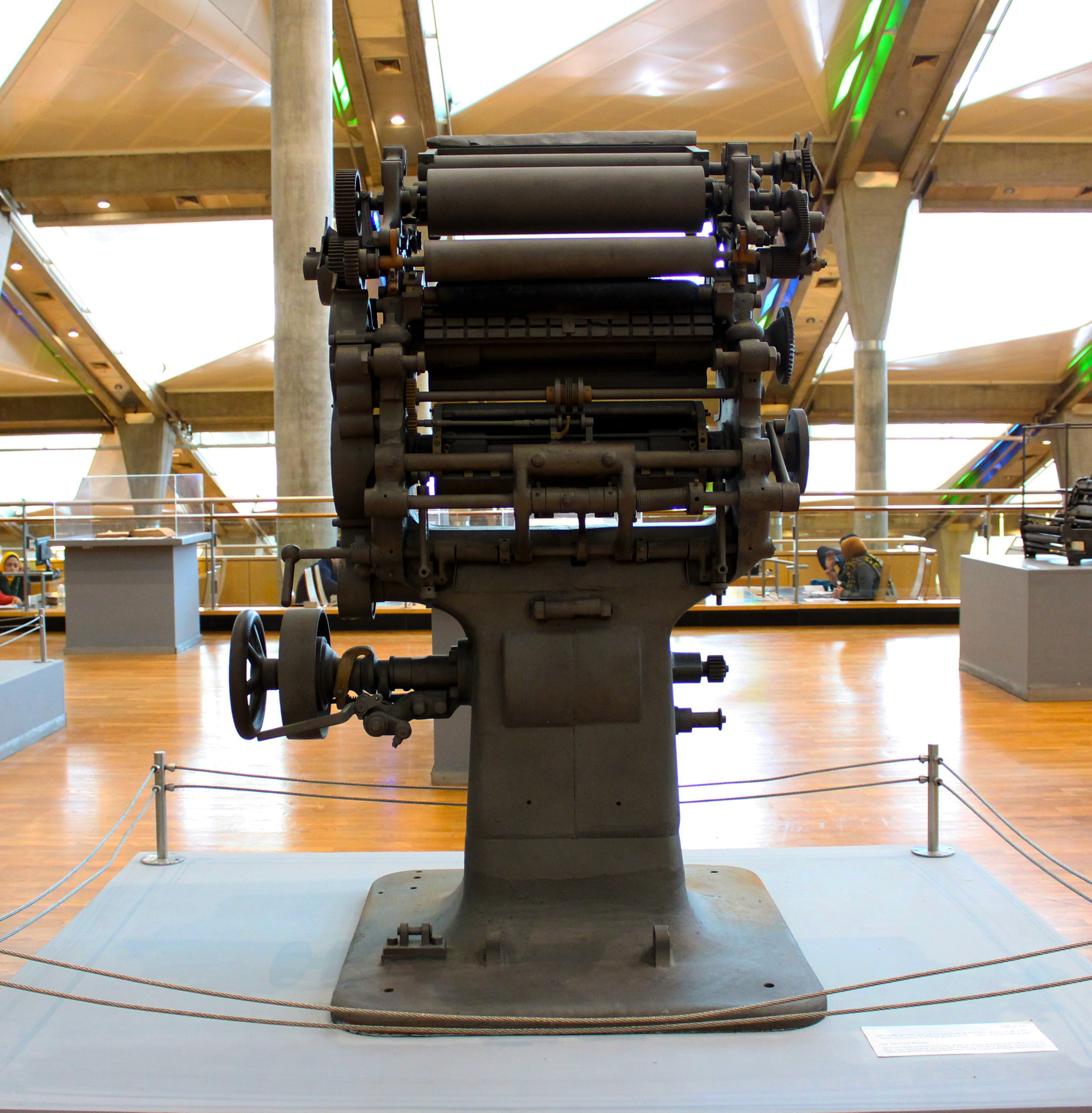
This envelope printing machine was one of the machine presses at the Bulaq Press. It was renovated during the reign of Khedive Ismail. Purchased in 1869, the British-made printer was used to print all kinds of envelopes. It is now in the Library of Alexandria.

The process began in 1815 when Muhammad Ali Pasha, four years into his reign over Egypt, sent a mission to Milan to learn the craft of printing and type-founding, as well as purchase printing presses.

The Amiri Press was established in 1820 and opened officially in the Bulaq neighborhood of Cairo in 1821. It published its first book in 1822: an Arabic–Italian dictionary prepared by the Syrian priest Anton Zakhūr Rafa'il.

In the beginning, the press published military books for the Egyptian army, but it soon developed and started to print literary books, science books, and textbooks. It was also Cairo's most active and important Turkish-language press.

Jurnal al-Khidiw, first published 1821–1822, was the first printed Arabic periodical:

The Jurnal, a bilingual Turkish-Arabic bulletin, was little more than a domestic circular intended for official consumption. With a run as small as 100 copies, it was designed for no other purpose than to keep the vali himself and his chief aides informed of state affairs. Handwritten at first, it was subsequently printed lithographically, appearing irregularly for a while before it became a weekly and later a daily publication.

The Jurnal was succeeded by Al-Waqa'i' al-Misriyya, first published December 3, 1828, with a run of about 600 copies. It was not sold to the public, but rather printed irregularly and distributed to a chosen state elite.

In the Tanzimat period (1839–1876), the Bulaq Press helped circulate the "unprecedented" volume of Islamic literature that was being translated into Ottoman Turkish.

In October 1862, Muhammad Sa'id Pasha gave the press to Abdurrahman Bik Rushdi. It was then purchased by Isma'il Pasha who added it to the Da'ira Sunnia (الدائرة السنية), or the royal possessions. Publications in this time included a Quran with commentary by Al-Zamakhshari.

The Amiri Press returned to the possession of the state in 1880, during the reign of Tewfik Pasha.

In 1905, the Amiri Press developed a new naskh-based typeface for body text. It served as the primary inspiration for the Amiri font, a 2011 naskh script designed by Dr. Khaled Hosny for typesetting body text.

In 1924 it published the iconic 1342 Cairo text, or King Fu'ad Quran – the first printed edition of the Quran to be accepted by an Islamic authority, Al-Azhar Mosque. A large number of pre-1924 Qurans were destroyed by dumping them in the Nile.

On August 13, 1956, Gamal Abdel Nasser passed Law 312 of 1956 ordering the establishment of the Amiria Press Authority under the jurisdiction of the Ministry of Trade & Industry. The first meeting of its administration – headed by the Ministry of Trade and Industry's administrator at the time, Aziz Sedky – was held on September 1, 1956. The ministry later decided to build a new 35,000 m^{2} building for the Amiria Press Authority and equip it with state-of-the-art printing technology to spread its messages.

The Amiria Press Authority officially began operations at its new location on July 28, 1973, during the Sadat administration under Ibrahim Salem Muhammadin, Minister of Trade and Industry at the time.

== Publications of the Amiria Press Authority ==
- The Official Journal: the official state-run newspaper, published every Thursday
- Al-Waqa'i' al-Masriyya (Egyptian Affairs): the oldest newspaper in Egypt, published as an appendix of the Official Journal and published daily except Fridays and holidays
- Other publications—government publications, legal books, calendars, and the Sherif Quranic Press
