= Flügel edition =

19th-century Quranic edition

The Flügel edition is an edition of the Quran produced by the German orientalist Gustav Leberecht Flügel (1802–1870), first published in 1834 by the publishing house Tauchnitz in Leipzig. In 1842, Flügel also published a concordance to go along with his edition. More broadly, Flügel's efforts can be understood in the context of the rapid rise of the field of philology in the second half of the eighteenth century in Germany, which began in biblical studies before also expanding into the realm of Quranic studies.

Although it was almost immediately recognized as inadequate primarily due to its splitting of verses and lack of consistently following any single one of the variant readings, the daunting task of producing another edition of the Quran from the thousands of available manuscripts and the lack of an alternative led to it being the standard edition used by Western researchers. For the time being, this allowed for consistency in the use of a reliable text and in textual citation according to the verse numbering used by Flügel. This remained the case until the publication of the Cairo edition of the Quran in 1924, which gradually superseded the use of the Flügel edition among researchers and also became the most widely used edition by contemporary Muslims.

== History ==
Prior to the Flügel edition, Western researchers first gained access to a printed edition of the Quran with the appearance of the Hinckelmann edition in 1694 and the Marracci edition in 1698. The publication of the Flügel Quran edition in 1834, in Leipzig by Tauchnitz publishers, superseded these editions. It was released in four issues, one of which was to meet the expectations of Muslim readers with respect to its paratext and book design. After the success of the initial publication, Tauchnitz would follow-up with several more editions and companion texts:

- In 1837, a student edition was published by Gustav Redslob.
- Two corrections were published in 1841 and in 1858.
- In 1842, Flügel accompanied his edition of the Quran by publishing a concordance in Latin, titled the Concordantiae Corani arabicae, which is considered a significant contribution to early Islamic studies.

Although it was not the first Quran printed in Europe, the publication of the Flügel edition allowed Western Quranic studies to gain a foothold for the first time. The publication of the Cairo edition in 1924 would lead to the phasing out of the use of the Flügel edition, although not immediately. Given the long-standing use of this edition, for some years academics cited verses along how they were numbered in both Cairo and Flügel editions, prior to a more complete supersession by the former.

== Differences with the Cairo edition ==
The Flügel edition has several differences with the contemporary Cairo edition, and Flügel was immediately criticized by other researchers for a number of the decisions he had made in the production of his edition. The first difference is that Flügel had made some modifications to vowel markers from the Muslim mushaf in trying to make the edition more consistent with the rules of classical Arabic orthography. The second is that the way that verses are numbered differs slightly as a result of some differences in decisions about where certain verses ended. In this respect, Flügel followed the verse numbering used by the Quran edition published by Abraham Hinckelmann in 1694. Third, the Cairo edition consistently follows the reading (qira'at) of Hafs 'an 'Asim, whereas Flügel drew from readings from several readers. Fourth, he introduced additional symbols meant to aid the reader in correctly pronouncing the text, such as at points of pauses in speech. A more complete analysis of the differences between the two editions has been published in a German article by Arne Ambros in 1988.

== See also ==
- Cairo edition
- History of the Quran
- Lex Mahumet pseudoprophete
