= Textual Criticism and Qurʼān Manuscripts =

2011 book by Keith E. Small

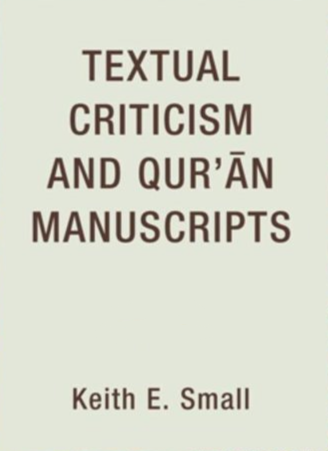
- Author: Keith E. Small
- Language: English
- Subjects: Textual criticism of the Quran
- Publisher: Lexington Books
- Publication date: April 2011
- Publication place: United Kingdom
- Media type: Print (Hardcover and Paperback) and E-book
- Pages: 228 pp.
- ISBN: 9780739142912

Textual Criticism and Qurʼān Manuscripts is a 2011 book on the textual criticism of the Quran by Keith E. Small, a researcher and lecturer at the Centre for Islamic Studies and Muslim–Christian Relations at the London School of Theology.

The book examines a small portion of the holy book of Islam, the Quran—specifically seven verses from Surah 14 (Ibrahim 35-41)—found in twenty-one early Qur'an manuscripts. It uses an application of "reasoned eclecticism" or (in the words of the publisher's blurb) "a method of textual analysis commonly used in studies of ancient Western and Eastern manuscripts", to attempt to 1) determine what the text was for these verses in the earliest versions of the Quran and 2) "to trace the historical development" of the small portion of seven verses "to the current form of the text of the Qur'an. Small comes to the conclusion that while it's not possible to determine the forms of text going back to the very beginning, a "significantly early edited form of the consonantal text" of the Qur'an can be.

== Content ==
A summary of the verses examined is:

- 35-36 True believers exhorted to steadfastness and prayer
- 37 Manifold favours of God to mankind
- 38-41 Abraham prays for himself and children that they may be kept from idolatry.

The book contains four parts:

1) chapters 1&2 covering the introduction and photographs and descriptions of the manuscripts used;
2) chapters 3-8 describing the textual variants in the manuscripts;
3) chapters 9-11 include comparisons of these variants with Islamic records of variants, discussing possible causes, including unintentional mistakes in oral transmission or intentional changes;
4) a concluding, twelfth chapter.

Small concludes that a critical text of the Quran (i.e. a scholarly reconstruction of the original Quran, using reasonable, educated guesses) cannot currently be constructed. He says,

"...the available sources do not provide the necessary information for reconstructing the original text of the Qur’ān from the time of Muhammad. Neither do they yet provide the necessary information for reconstructing the text from the time immediately after Muhammad's death until the first official edition of the Qur’ān traditionally ordered by the Caliph ‘Uthmān".

He states "there never was one original text of the Qur'an", that the Uthmanic destruction of variant texts around 850 CE, eliminated "many texts which had equally good claims to containing authentic readings", that before the three century-long "process of development and improvement" to standardize the Quran phonetically, there were "50 different ways" of reciting the Quran. (Note: One reviewer -- anonymous Quranic blogger twopennyposts -- believes Small's book "confirms that the Quran must have had a definitive form established at an early date, even if that form was written in defective text and thus didn’t solidify explicitly one standard of recitation. One of the key things Islamic tradition builds upon is that the Quran was collected into an authorized standard and preserved at an early date, which this book confirms.") Fred Donner interprets Small's work as showing

"that there was a very early attempt to establish a uniform consonantal text of the Qurʾān from what was probably a wider and more varied group of related texts in early transmission. [...] After the creation of this standardized canonical text, earlier authoritative texts were suppressed, and all extant manuscripts—despite their numerous variants—seem to date to a time after this standard consonantal text was established."

Donner also says though that Small's conclusions are tentative, because analogous work on larger passages of the Quran may give different results.

== Reception ==
Fred Donner of the University of Chicago writes that the book is of "manifest excellence and importance", with "but minor blemishes". One fault Donner sees is that Small does not engage with the work of Christoph Luxenberg. Efim Rezvan of the Saint Petersburg State University says that the work is "capital" and brings "new insights to the history of the development of a standardized text of the Qur’ān." Marcin Grodzki of the University of Warsaw writes that—despite some "minor flaws"—Small should be congratulated for his work, and that it should be given a "prominent place" in libraries involved with the history of early Islam and the study of the Quran. One flaw Grodzki sees is that the book does not consider the possibility of the use different alphabets in the initial written transmission of the Quran, such as the use of the Syriac alphabet in Garshuni.

In his review, Larry Hurtado endorses Small's conclusions.

"In Small's bold statement, ‘the history of the transmission of the text of the Qur’ān is at least as much a testament to the destruction of Qur’ān material as it is to its preservation’, and ‘is also testimony to the fact that there never was one original text of the Qur’ān’. What we have in the Qur’ān as transmitted is ‘a text-form that was chosen from amidst a group of others, which was then edited and canonized at the expense of these others, and has been improved upon in order to make it conform to a desired ideal’. ... "This is not so totally different from the textual histories of other scriptural texts. And perhaps that is the chief point which emerges from Small's analysis. It is richly documented, informed by other recent scholarship (both traditional Muslim and ‘Western’), eirenic and respectful in tone, and a solid and impressive case for the observations advanced."

== Bibliography ==
- Donner, Fred M. (2014). "Review: Textual Criticism and Qurʾān Manuscripts, by Keith E. Small". Journal of Near Eastern Studies. 73 (1): 166–169. doi:10.1086/674909.
- Grodzki, Marcin (2013). "Review: Textual Criticism and Qurʾān Manuscripts, by Keith E. Small". Islam and Christian–Muslim Relations. 25 (3): 1–2. doi:10.1080/09596410.2013.861674. S2CID 144272787.
- Hurtado, Larry W. (2015). "Book Review Keith E. Small, Textual Criticism and Qur'ān Manuscripts". Scottish Journal of Theology. 68: 114–116. doi:10.1017/S0036930614000283.
- Rezvan, Efim A. (December 2011). "Review: Textual Criticism and Qur'ān Manuscripts, by Keith E. Small". Manuscripta Orientalia. 17 (2): 66–68.
- Small, Keith E. (2011). Textual Criticism and Qur'ān Manuscripts. Lexington Books. ISBN 9780739142912.
