= Al-Waqa'i' al-Misriyya =

Egyptian newspaper

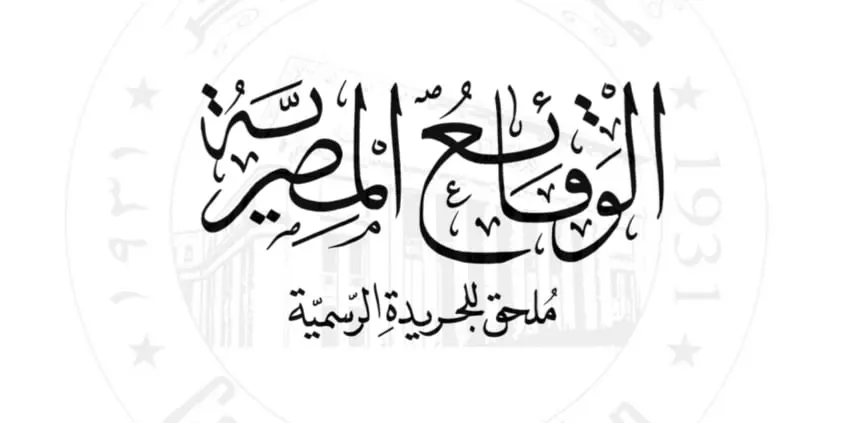
- Founder: Muhammad Ali Pasha
- Publisher: Amiri Press
- Launched: December 3, 1828; 197 years ago
- Language: Arabic
- City: Cairo
- Country: Egypt

Al-Waqa'i' al-Misriyya (Arabic: الوقائع المصريّة / ALA-LC: Al-Waqā’i‘ al-Miṣrīyah; meaning "the Egyptian affairs") is an Egyptian government information bulletin (previously a newspaper) established in 1828. It is the first native African newspaper in Africa, and the first Arabic newspaper in the Middle East. The newspaper was printed at the Amiri Press. Al-Waqa'i' was the official gazette of Egypt, and is now published as an appendix of the Official Journal.

It was established on the order of Muhammad Ali, originally titled Vekâyi-i Mısriyye (Ottoman Turkish: وقایع مصریه) and written in Ottoman Turkish in the right column with an Arabic translation in the left one, and later in Arabic only under the Arabic title.

== Precedents ==
The newspaper's earliest precedent was Napoleon's Courier de l'Égypte, published every five days (according to another source, every ten days) (Note: The first issue was published on August 29, 1798 and the last one on June 9, 1801, 1014 days later. A total of 116 issues were published, meaning that, on average, an issue was published every 1014 / (116 − 1) ≈ 8.8 days.) in four pages in French starting on August 29, 1798, for French propaganda during the French campaign in Egypt and Syria. It included current events, courts-martial, and French Army festivities. Inspired by this, the government of Ali Pasha decided to establish the Amiri Press. Although there was no official press policy on what to write, the leader wanted to keep abreast of local and foreign developments and ordered the publication of an official government newspaper.

Jurnal al-Khidiw (Arabic: جرنال الخديوي, Ottoman Turkish: جرنال الخديوى; lit. 'Journal of the Khedive'), a bilingual Turkish–Arabic bulletin first published 1821–1822, was the first printed periodical in Arabic. It was printed irregularly at first, using lithography and with as few as 100 copies per run.

== History ==
=== Reign of Muhammad Ali Pasha ===
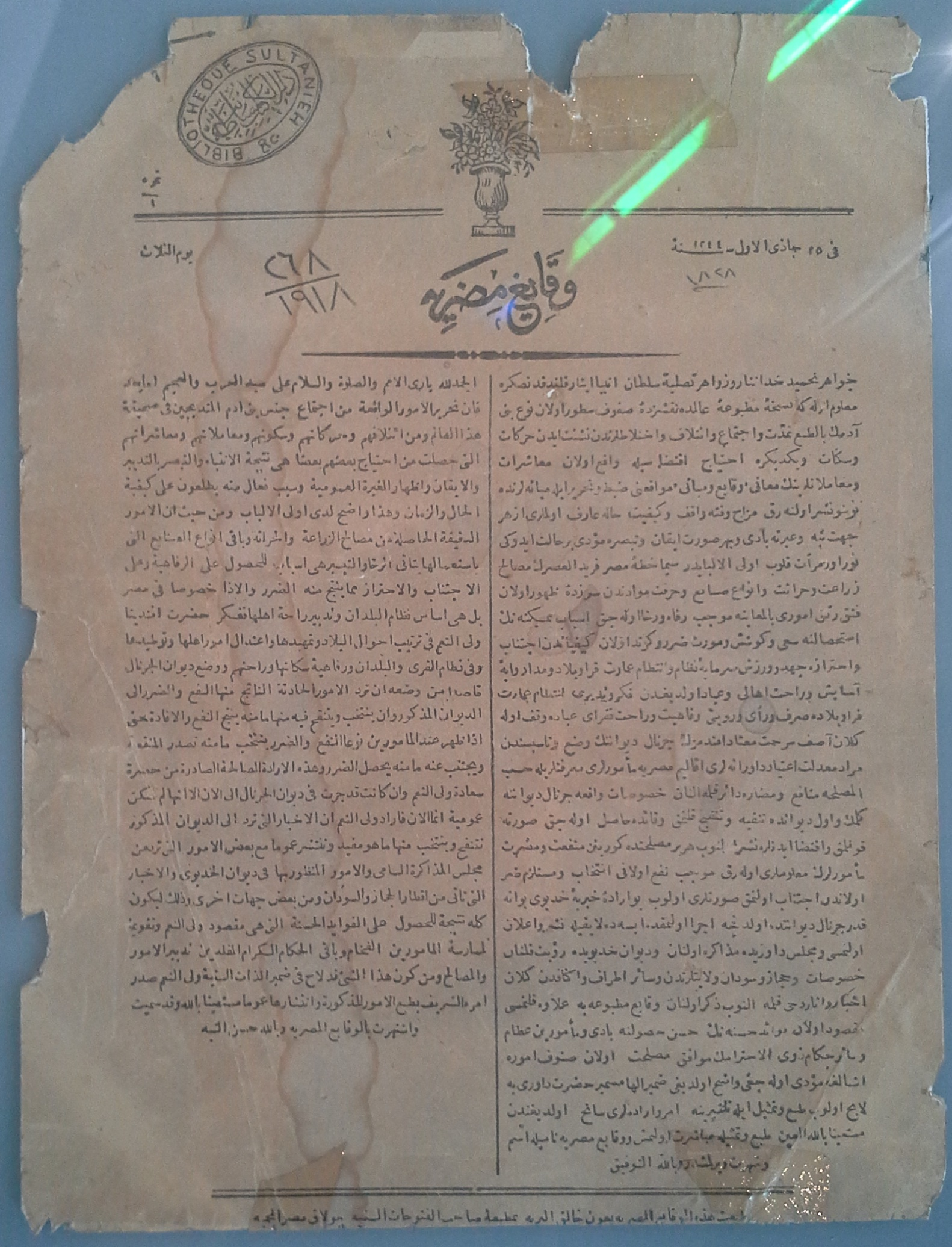
The first edition of Vekâyi-i Mısriyye, published in 1828 (Bibliotheca Alexandrina)

During the Ottoman period, a newspaper known as الجهادية ("Struggle") was distributed within the military of the Ottoman Empire for a subscription and offered free to civilian officials and subjects like their counterparts in Europe, but the Pasha believed the paper was only read by the most senior officials, courtiers, scholars, and the army. To enhance readership among the new class of civil servants, he required those who earned at least 1,000 piasters a month to subscribe for 77 piasters and 11 kuruş. Even French employees not fluent in Arabic or Ottoman Turkish were pursued for collection. In fact, an employee in the Finance Bureau was killed by his son to keep the latter from getting his salary garnished over paternal subscription debt. The Pasha made sure that the paper was published and distributed regularly, even on holidays, together with rations of meat, rice, and ghee.

The first issue of Waqa'i' Misr (وقايع مصر), published on December 3, 1828, featured four pages 38 centimetres (15 in) long with a Turkish column translated into Arabic. The first page had both translations side-by-side along with the mission statement. There was no regular publication schedule, and issues ranged from one to three times a week and sometime appeared a fortnight apart. Mustafa Sami Efendi was appointed the first editor of the Turkish section, and Shihab ad-Din Muhammad Ismail (شهاب الدين محمد بن اسماعيل بن عمر المكي المصري) served as his Arabic-language counterpart; both were paid 750 piasters for their work.

Al-Waqa'i' al-Misriyya apparently inspired Le Moniteur ottoman, a francophone gazette published under Mahmud II.

The distinctive original letterhead at first featured a potted plant symbolizing the cotton tree left of the masthead until issue 18, when it was replaced with a pyramid in front of the Sun. Issues 535–540 were printed by Royal Chronicle Press (starting on June 15, 1833, near the end of the First Egyptian–Ottoman War), but production returned to the Amiri Press until Said's reign. A reverent tone was taken to the government.

=== At-Tahtawi era ===
In 1842, Rifa'a at-Tahtawi began developing form, content, and style of Al-Waqa'i' al-Misriyya, most notably by focusing more on Arabic language and culture, prioritizing local news over the once-prevalent Ottoman news, and pioneering the publication of book and political editorials. The latter was a source of friction with government officials, leading Khedive Abbas I of Egypt to send him to what was then the colony of Turkish Sudan on accession in 1848, from whence he would return in 1854 when Sa'id of Egypt succeeded Abbas. Under At-Tahtawi's editorship, scholarly articles were published in the paper; his first issue (No. 623 in 1842) included some poems and quotations from the Muqaddimah of Ibn Khaldun.

=== Reigns of Said and Isma’il Pasha ===
Sa’id, however, ended official control of publication during his reign (1854–1863) after completing a redesign and pricing it at 120 piasters a year with the director paid 3000 piasters a month and the editor 1500. Sheikh Ahmed Abdelrahim became the first independent editor.

=== Abduh’s Reforms ===
In 1880, Prime Minister Riyad Pasha appointed Muhammad Abduh as editor of Al-Waqa'i' al-Misriyya. Abduh emphasized education and social reform as a figure in the turn-of-the-century Arabic Enlightenment or Nahda. Abduh published every day except Friday, and in the wake of the 1882 Anglo-Egyptian War, the paper became completely independent. Now in formal Arabic, it sold advertising for two piasters a line and was available for a penny per issue. Among the luminaries on Abduh's staff were independence pioneer Saad Zaghloul and Ibrahim Al-Helbawi, the first president of the Egypt Bar Association.

=== Return to official status ===
In 1911, Al-Waqa'i' al-Misriyya returned to government control, accompanied by a new masthead with a crown centered on the flag of Egypt and shifting advertisements and subscription guides from the left and right margins to the last page. Special issues on Sundays and Thursdays were introduced in 1912. Ahmad Sadiq Bey was appointed director of Amiri Press and editor in 1917 under the auspices of the Ministry of Finance. Although the price was slightly altered by his successor George Newton, form and content remained consistent.

=== Emile Forgé’s term ===
Emile Forgé was appointed editor of Al-Waqa'i' al-Misriyya on January 17, 1924, during a time of renewed parliamentary vigor under King Fuad I. Records from Parliament sessions were published as annexes to issues until the Egyptian revolution of 1952. Hassan Ali Kalwa Bey, Forgé's successor, sometimes published the text in green against a frame with calligraphic inscriptions, including a famed royal decree on the birth of King Fuad II. The paper published all royal orders, decrees, Cabinet decisions, and internal cases without editorial independence, though it did not mention the Revolution of July 23, 1952 as it was going on.

=== Modern history ===
On January 16, 1954, the coat of arms of Egypt and the Basmala appeared atop the letterhead of Al-Waqa'i' al-Misriyya and prices were raised to 30 milliemes a copy and 240 milliemes a line to advertise. Under Gamal Abdel Nasser, the paper was published daily in Arabic and on Thursdays in French. Prices per copy reached 5 piastres in 1966 due to raw materials shortages, but were reduced to just 70 milliemes in 1974. Advertising reached £E6 a line in 1988, the year a postage stamp was issued to commemorate the newspaper's history.

== Online availability ==
- 1829–1839 (partial) via Gallica
- 1865–1895 (partial) via Center for Research Libraries

== See also ==
- List of newspapers in Egypt
- Media of Egypt
- History of newspaper publishing in the Arab world
- TGC Press Media Museum in Istanbul, Turkey, which exhibits examples of the newspaper
