= Jurnal al-Khidiw =

First printed periodical in Arabic

Jurnal al-Khidiw جرنال الخديوي
- Founded: 1821
- Ceased publication: 1828
- Language: Arabic, Ottoman Turkish

Jurnal al-Khidiw (Arabic: جرنال الخديوي, Ottoman Turkish: جرنال الخديوى - lit. "Journal of the Khedive"), first published 1821–1822, was the first printed periodical in Arabic. It was a bilingual Turkish–Arabic bulletin for official use, with a limited print run as small as 100 copies. Initially handwritten and printed lithographically with irregular frequency, the publication eventually transitioned to a weekly and later daily schedule.

It was succeeded by Al-Waqa'i' al-Misriyya, first published December 3, 1828.
