= Mukhtasar =

Islamic law

Mukhtaṣar (Arabic: المختصر), in Islamic law, refers to a concise handbook or legal treatise, characterized by concision relative to other legal genres. Mukhtasars originated during the Abbasid caliphate and were created as a method to facilitate the quick training of lawyers without the repetitiveness of lengthy volumes, yet evolved into a mode of access into the fundamentals of Islamic law for the educated layperson. Some well-known mukhtasars include the Mukhtasar of Khalil, by the Egyptian Maliki scholar Khalil ibn Ishaq al-Jundi (died 1365), and the Mukhtasar al-Quduri, by Hanafi scholar Imam al-Quduri (973–1037) of Baghdad.

== Imam Quduri ==
Mukhtasar of Imam Quduri is one of the most significant work in codification of Hanafi fiqh (Islamic jurisprudence), widely studied in Islamic seminaries

== Ibn Abī Zamanīn ==
The Mukhtasar of Ibn Abī Zamanīn was one of the five great commentary manuscripts in the personal library of Ludovico Maracci that helped inform 18th Century Europe about Islam.
