= Ludovico Marracci =

Italian Oriental scholar and professor of Arabic

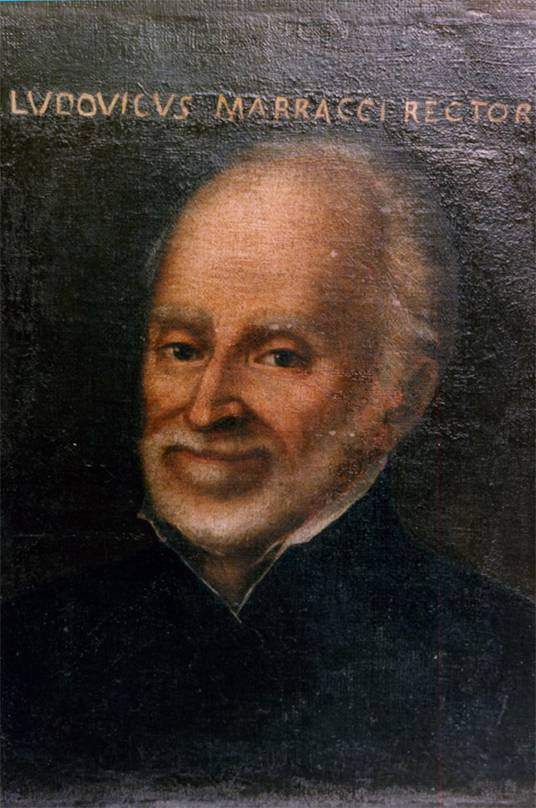
Ludovico Marracci

Ludovico Marracci (6 October 1612 – 5 February 1700), also known by Luigi Marracci, was an Italian Oriental scholar and professor of Arabic at Sapienza University of Rome.

He is chiefly known as the publisher and editor of Alcorani Textus Universus Arabicè, a translation of Quran in Latin, and for editing an Arabic Bible translation, and numerous other works.

== Biography ==
He was born at Lucca in 1612. He had become a member of the Clerics Regular of the Mother of God of Lucca and learnt with reputed success in the study of non-European languages, especially Arabic. He was the Confessor of Pope Innocent XI. The Pope appointed him professor of Arabic at Sapienza University of Rome due to his proficiency in that language. In 1665 he was part of the team that debunked the lead tablets of Granada.

He later declined the promotion of being appointed to the rank of Cardinal of the Catholic Church. He died at an age of 88 in 1700.

He authored The Life of Father Leonardi, the founder of the Clerics Regular of the Mother of God of Lucca, and many more.

In 2012, a collection of his manuscripts were discovered at the Order of Clerics Regular of the Mother of God in Rome. The collection consists of almost 10,000 pages. The manuscripts include his work material, notes and significant information on his approach to translating the Qurʻan, as well as different versions of his translation. Based on the study of these manuscripts, a new examination of his life, influence, and methods has been published.

== Arabic Bible ==
He has considerable share in editing the Roman edition of the Arabic Bible, published in 1671 in three volumes. For this, the Congregation for the Evangelization of Peoples appointed Abraham Ecchellensis and Ludovico Marracci to undertake the revision of the edition to make it exactly correspond with the Vulgate. Marracci wrote a new preface and made a list of errors of the former copy in 1668.

== Vatican Quran ==
Ludovico Marracci acquired much fame in editing and publishing the Qurʻan in Arabic with his translation into Latin. Alcorani Textus Universus Arabicè et Latinè, was published in Padua in 1698 in two volumes. His version of the Qurʻan included a life of Muhammad, with notes, and refutations of Muslim doctrines. It was the result of forty years of labour and toilsome research of the Benedictines. He also published in 1691, in Latin, a refutation of the Quran titled Prodromus Ad Refutationem Alcoran.

Marracci's Islamic texts included Ibn Abī Zamanīn, Al-Tha'alibi, Zamakhsharī, Baydִāwī and Suyūtִī.

Alcorani's ‘Introduction’ (Prodromus) had been published seven years earlier in 1691.

George Sale's English translation of the Qurʻan, The Alcoran of Mohammed, in 1736, was done based on Marracci's 1698 Latin translation.
