= Cairo edition =

1924 version of the Qur'an

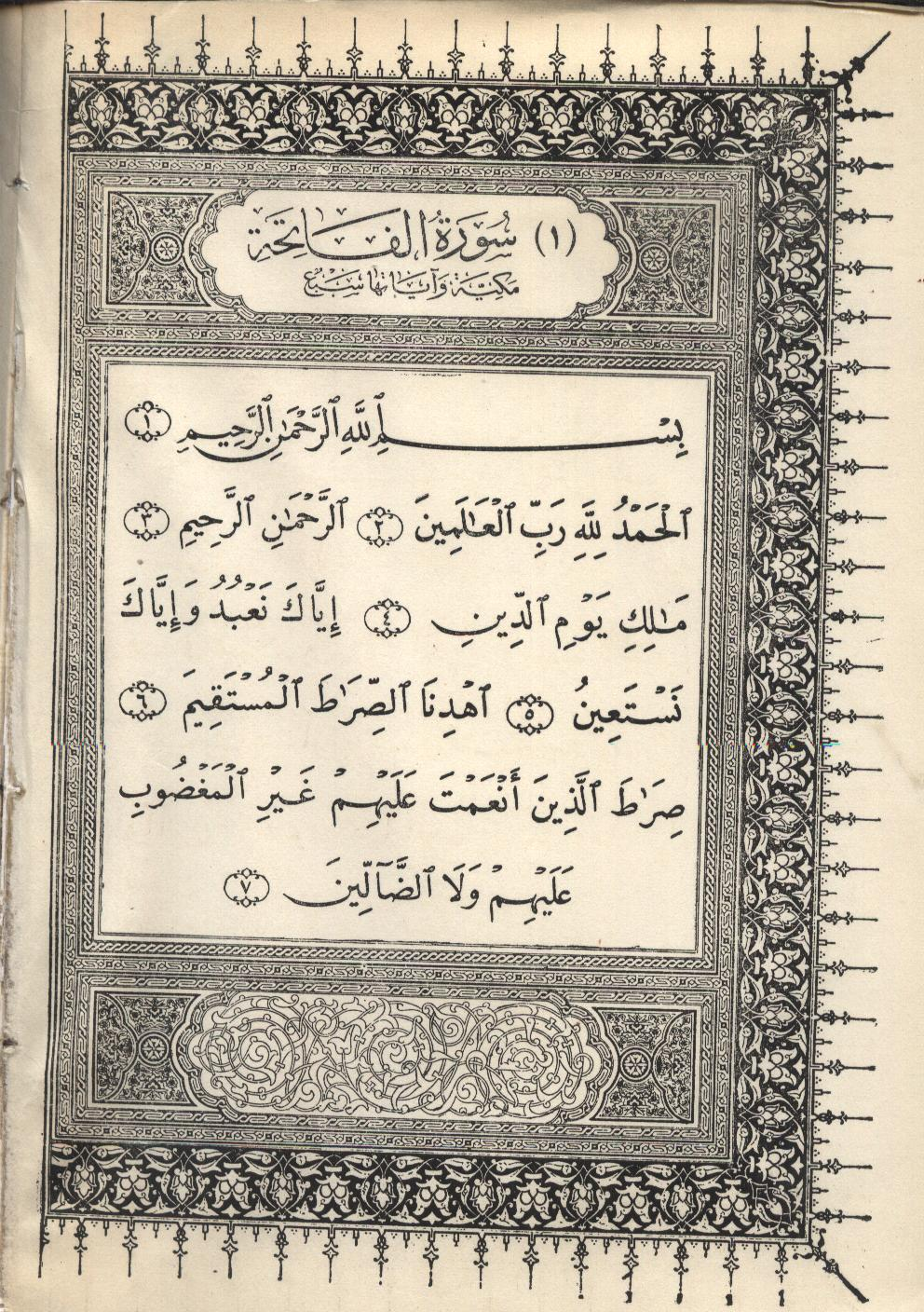
Al-Fatiha from the Cairo edition

The Cairo edition (Arabic: المصحف الأميري, "the Amīrī muṣhaf"), or the King Fu'ād Quran (مصحف الملك فؤاد) or the Azhar Quran, is an edition of the Quran printed by the Amiri Press in the Bulaq district of Cairo on July 10, 1924. It is the first printed Quran to be accepted by a Muslim authority, this authority being Al-Azhar.

The process of creating the Fu'ad Quran lasted 17 years, from 1907 to 1924, achieved with the support of Fuad I of Egypt and the supervision of the scholars of al-Azhar Mosque. It was regarded as an "official" Quran and was replicated by a number of following editions.

== History ==
A committee of leading professors from al-Azhar University had started work on the project in 1907, but it was not until 10 July 1924 that the Amiri Press published the resulting edition under the patronage of King Fuad I. It is sometimes known as the 'royal (amīriyya) edition'.

The goal of the government of the newly-formed Kingdom of Egypt was not to delegitimize the other methods of recitation, but to eliminate errors found in Qur’anic texts used in state schools. To do this, they chose to preserve one of the fourteen qira'at 'readings', namely that of Hafs (d. 180/796), the student of ‘Asim. Its publication has been called a "terrific success", and the edition has been described as one "now widely seen as the official publishing methods of the Qur’an", and is popular among both Sunni and Shia Muslims. Minor amendments were made later in 1924 and in 1936 - the "Faruq edition" in honour of then ruler, King Faruq.

Reasons given for the overwhelming popularity of Hafs and Asim include the fact that it doesn’t have Imāla, Ibdāl and so forth, making it easy to recite. Ingrid Mattson credits mass-produced printing press mushaf with increasing the availability of the written Quran but also diminishing the diversity of qira'at. Written text has become canonical and oral recitation has lost much of its previous equality.

Muslim disagreement over whether to include the Basmala within the Quranic text, reached consensus following the 1924 Edition, which included it as the first verse (āyah) of Quran chapter 1 but otherwise included it as an unnumbered line of text preceding the other relevant 112 chapters. The Cairo Quran adopted the Kufan tradition of separating and numbering verses, and thus standardized a different verse numbering to Flügel's 1834 edition. It adopted the order of chapters attributed to Ibn Abbās, which became widely accepted following 1924. A large number of pre-1924 Qurans were destroyed by disposing of them in the river Nile.

Prominent committee members included Islamic scholar, Muhammad b. ‘Ali al-Husayni al-Haddad, Egypt's senior Qur'an Reader (Shaykh al-Maqâri). Noteworthy Western scholars/academics working in Egypt during the era include Bergsträsser and Jeffery. Methodological differences aside, speculation alludes to a spirit of cooperation. Bergsträsser was certainly impressed with the work.
