= Hazrati Imam Complex =

Hazrati Imam complex
- Hazrati Imom majmuasi (Uzbek); Hasti Imom majmuasi (Uzbek)
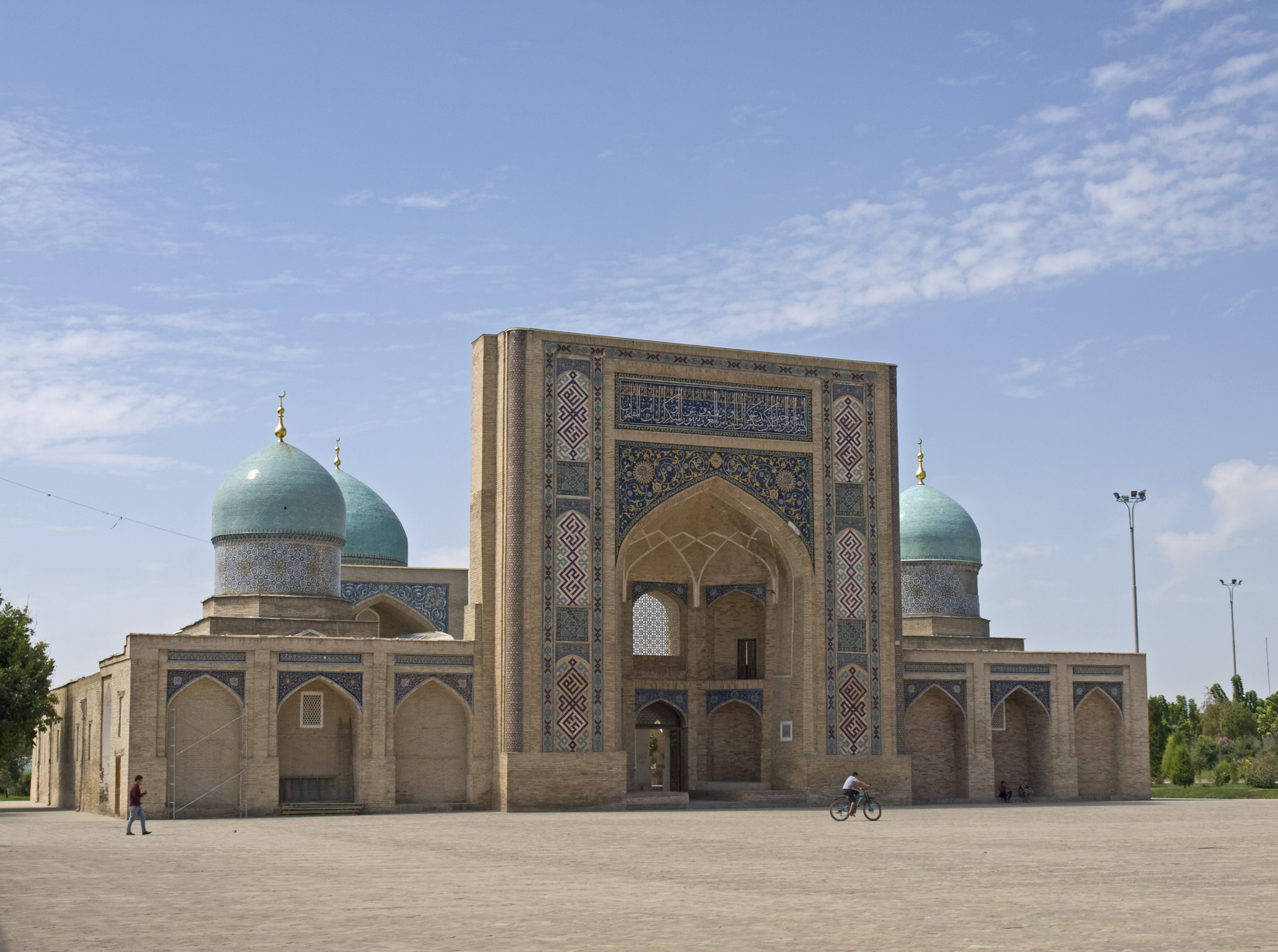
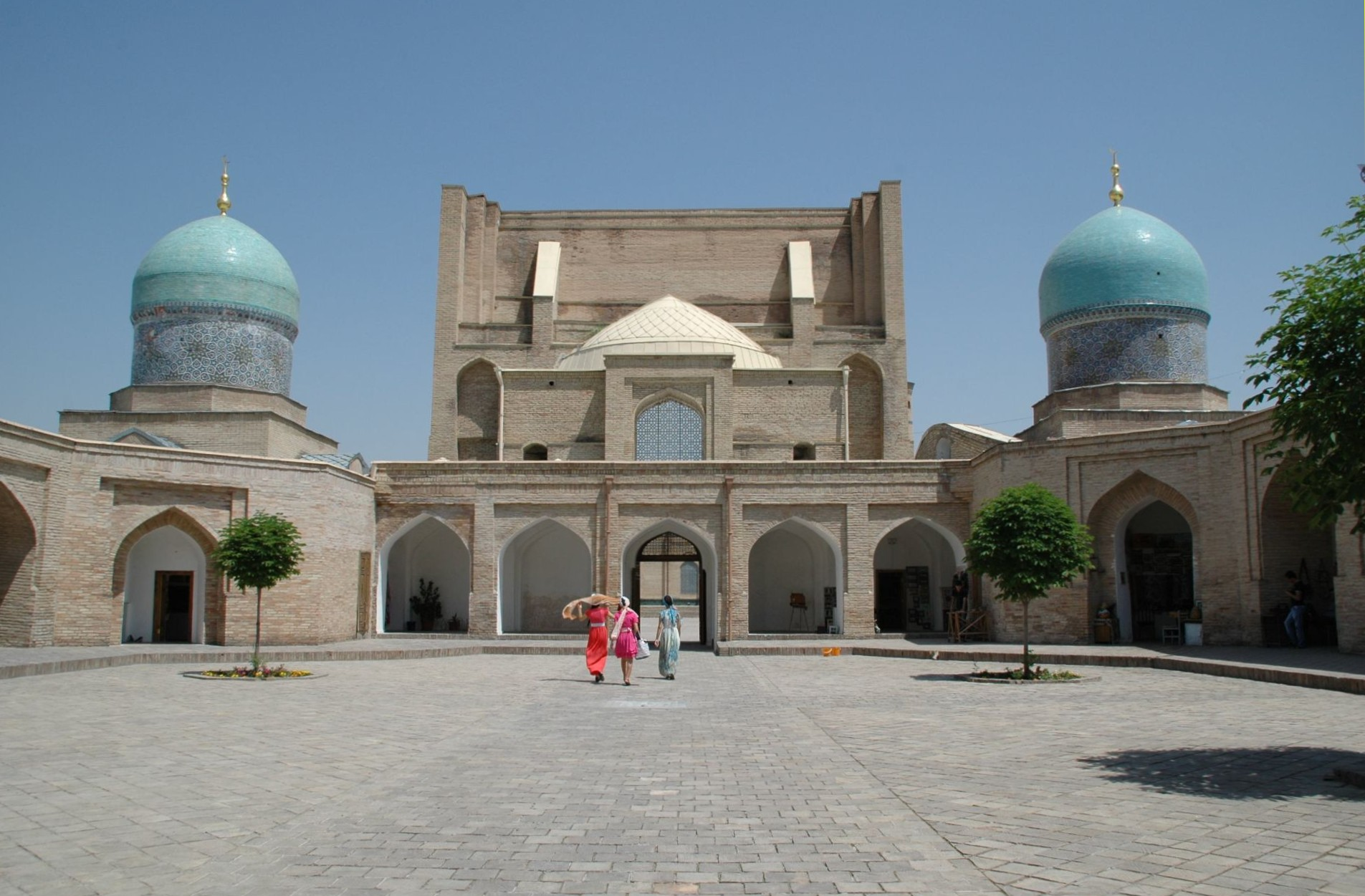
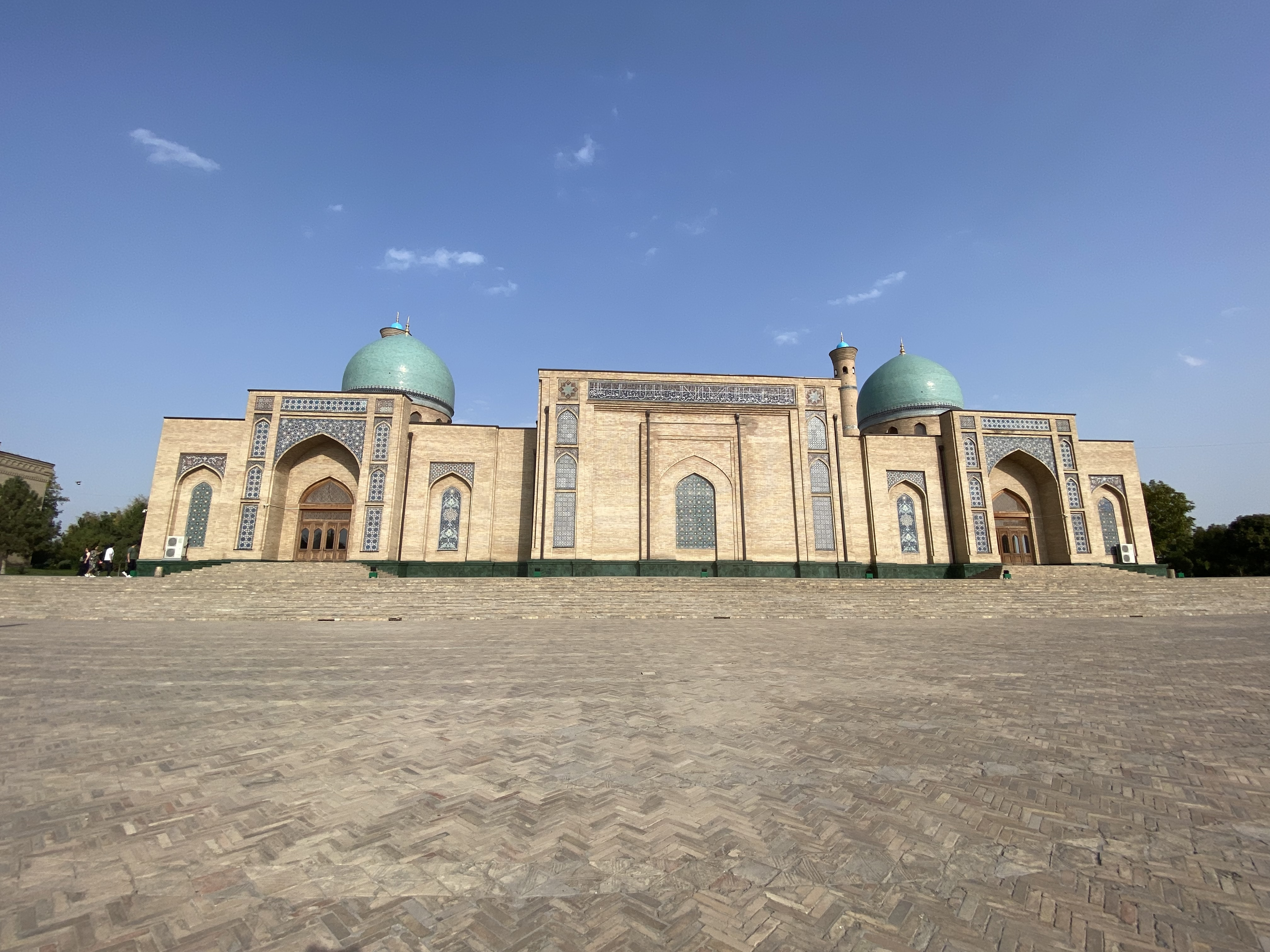
- The Hazrati Imam complex in Tashkent
- Interactive map of Hazrati Imam complex
- 41.3147°N 69.2633°E
- Type: Religious complex
- Location: Olmazor district, Tashkent, Uzbekistan

History
- Built: 16th to 20th centuries

Site notes
- Architectural style: Islamic
- Governing body: Administration of Muslims of Uzbekistan

The Hazrati Imam complex (also known as Hastimom or Hastim) is an architectural monument dating from the 16th to 20th centuries, located in the Olmazor district of Tashkent city, Uzbekistan. The complex consists of the Moʻyi Muborak madrasa, the Qaffol Shoshi mausoleum, the Baroqxon Madrasa, the Hazrati Imam mosque, the Tillashayx mosque, and the Imam al-Bukhari Islamic Institute. The ensemble was built near the grave of Hazrati Imam, the first imam-khatib of Tashkent, a scholar, one of the first Islamic preachers in Tashkent, a poet and an artist.

According to historical sources, Hazrati Imam was also a master of making locks and keys, for which he received the nickname "Qaffol", meaning "locksmith". He also spoke 72 languages and translated the Old Testament (Torah) into Arabic.

Today, the Hazrati Imam complex is located in the "Old City" part of Tashkent, and survived the strong earthquake of 1966. In 2007, by the Decree of the President of the Republic of Uzbekistan Islam Karimov, the Hazrati Imam (Hastimom) public association was established, and construction and renovation works were carried out to restore the original historical appearance of the Hazrati Imam complex. In 2026, the Center for Islamic Civilization was opened next door, to which the Samarkand Codex, held at Hazrati Imam since 1989, was transferred.

== History ==
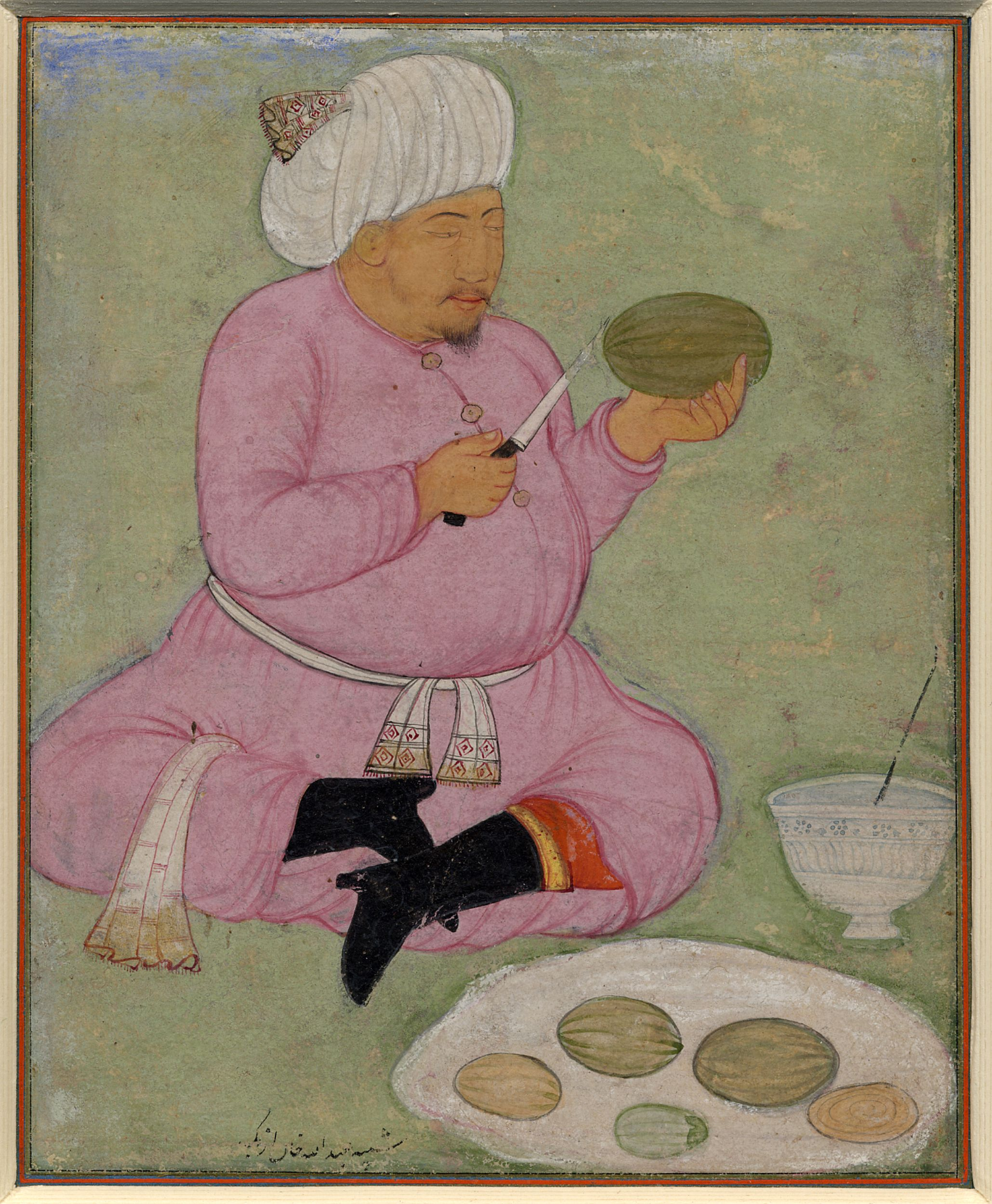
Bukhara Khanate ruler Abdullah Khan II

The Hazrati Imam complex was built around the tomb of imam Abu Bakr Muhammad ibn Ali Ismoil ash-Qaffol Shoshiy. The tomb and the surrounding architectural monuments are named after Hazrati Imam. Initially, the Baroqxon madrasa, then the Qaffol Shoshiy mausoleum and in 1579 the Shayx Bobohoji mausoleum (which has not survived) were built by the funds of Abdullah Khan II. In the mid-19th century, the Tashkent namazgoh (Tillashayx mosque), the Moʻyi Muborak madrasa, and the Juma mosque (which has not survived) were built in the Hazrati Imam complex. In the early 20th century, the Tillashayx mosque was renovated and acquired a new appearance. Eshon Boboxon was also buried here. The Hazrati Imam complex houses the Administration of Muslims of Uzbekistan, inheritor of the Soviet-era Spiritual Administration of the Muslims of Central Asia and Kazakhstan. The Samarkand Kufic Quran, one of the oldest surviving Quran manuscripts in the world that claims to be the personal copy of the Quran that the third caliph Uthman ibn Affan was martyred upon, was kept in the Hazrati Imam Complex from March 1989 until November 2025, when it was moved to the new Center for Islamic Civilization.

=== Tillashayx Mosque ===
The Tillashayx mosque was built by the famous Tashkent shayx Tillashayx at the end of the 19th and the beginning of the 20th century, precisely in 1890–1902. The Tillashayx mosque was closed by the local administration of the Russian Empire shortly after it started operating. The mosque was rebuilt for the last time in 1902. The mosque was closed in the 1930s and turned into an artel (a cooperative of craftsmen). In 1943, when permission was given to establish the religious supervision of Muslims of Central Asia and Kazakhstan, one of the first mosques to resume its activity was "Tilla Shayx". The mosque was renovated by master Shirin Murodov in 1955–1963. In 1972–1973, the mosque was renovated and expanded, a new khanqah was built on the qibla side and the wall on both sides of the previous mihrab was removed and added.

=== Baroqxon madrasa ===
The Baroqxon madrasa is an architectural monument built of burnt bricks by the architect Gʻulom Husayn in the second half of the 16th century (1531–1532) by the order of Mirzo Ulugʻbek's grandson Navroʻz Ahmadxon, nicknamed "Baraqxon". There are two mausoleums inside the madrasa - the first one is the Suyunchxoʻjaxon mausoleum, which was erected on the grave of Suyunchxoʻjaxon, the first ruler of Tashkent from the Shaybanid dynasty, and the second one is the Nameless mausoleum. This mausoleum was built for Baraqxon, but Baraqxon was later buried in Samarkand. The doors of the Baroqxon madrasa cells are decorated with ivory and colored metals. The Baroqxon madrasa had 34 cells, a mosque, and a lecture hall in 1868. The madrasa was severely damaged by the earthquake of 1886, and its 22-meter dome collapsed. By 1917, the madrasa was turned into a dormitory. Since 1936, the madrasa has been used as a society of the blind and a warehouse. The building was used as the headquarters of the Administration of Muslims of Uzbekistan until the end of 2006.

=== Qaffol Shoshiy mausoleum ===
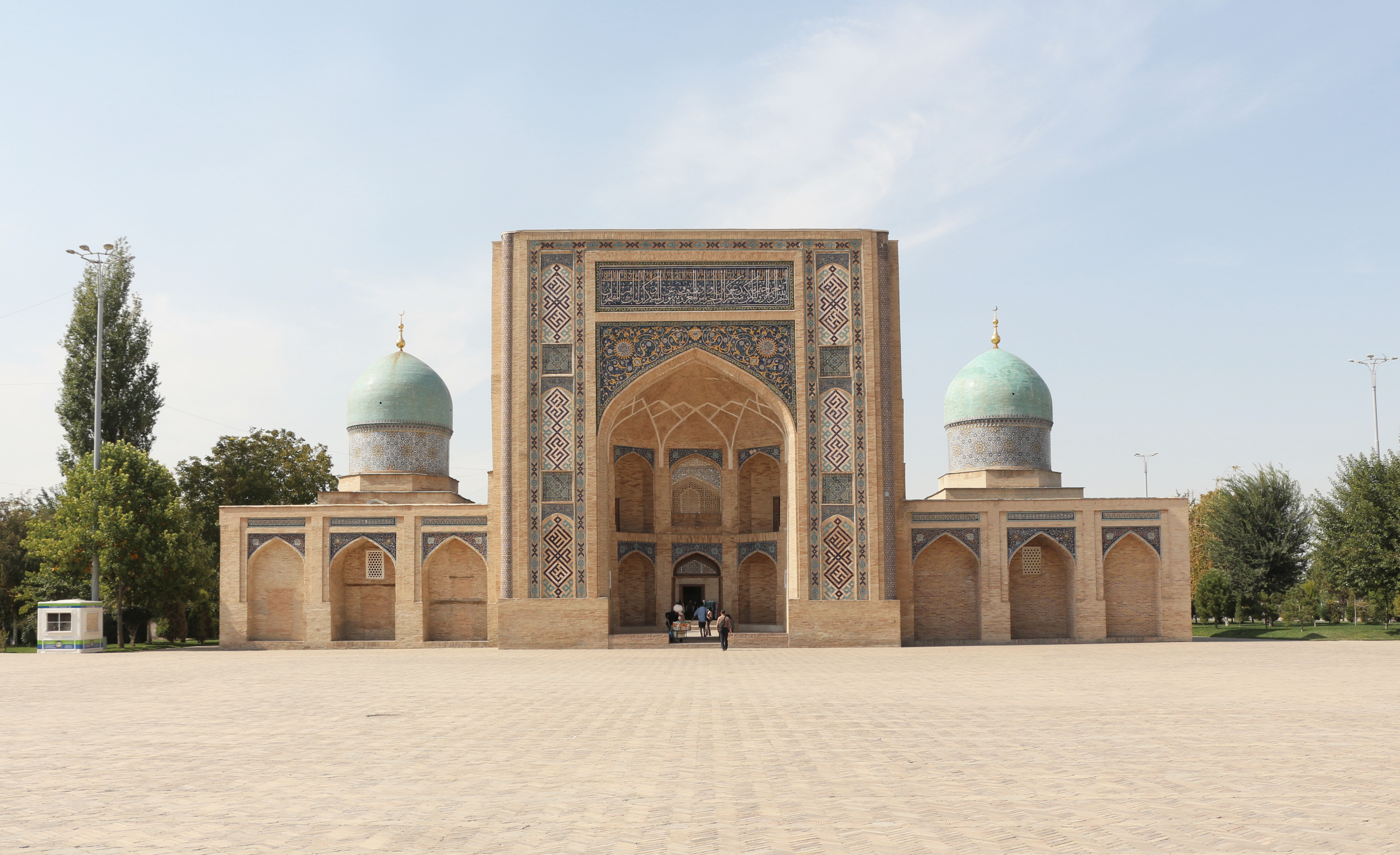
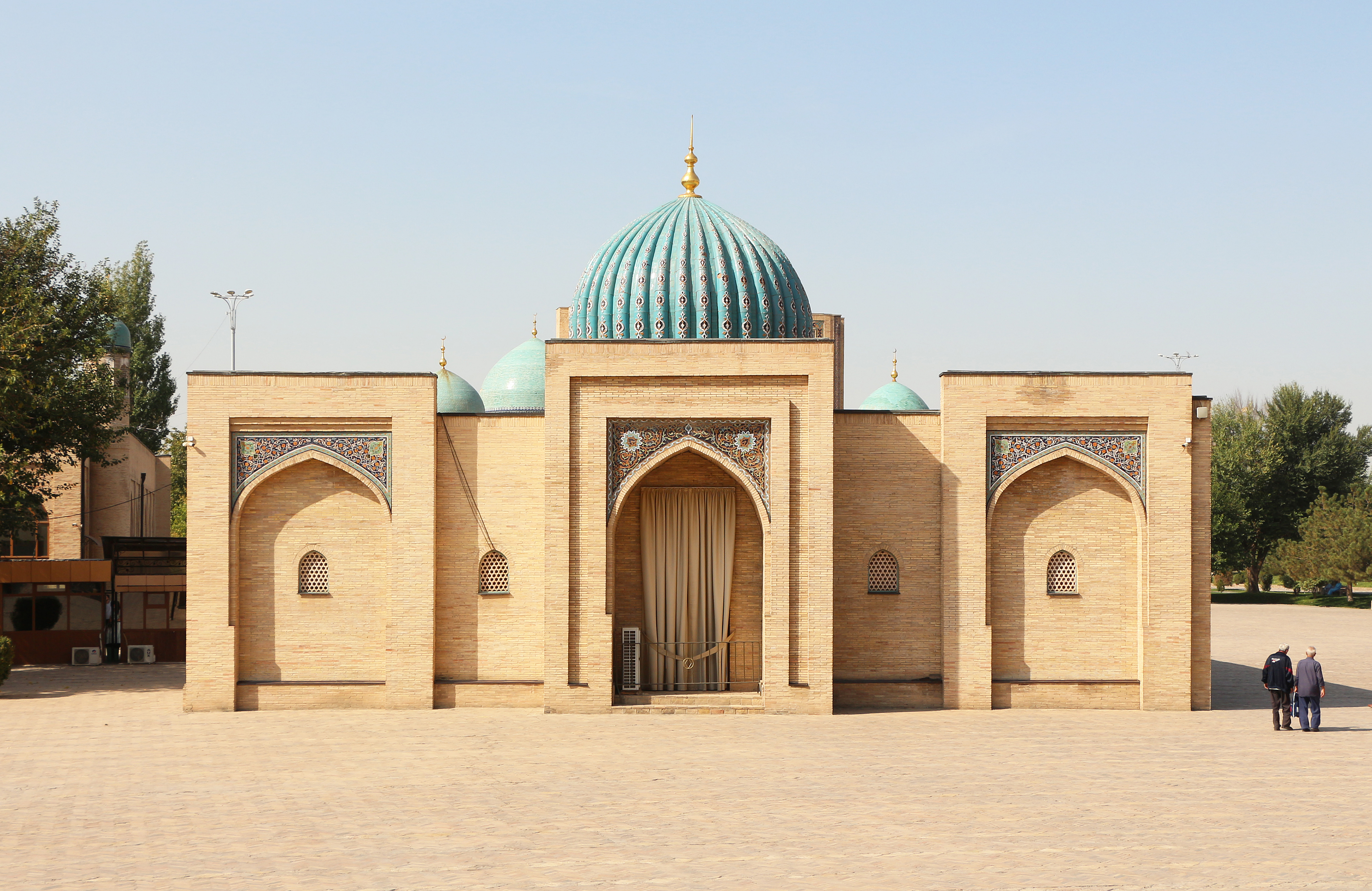
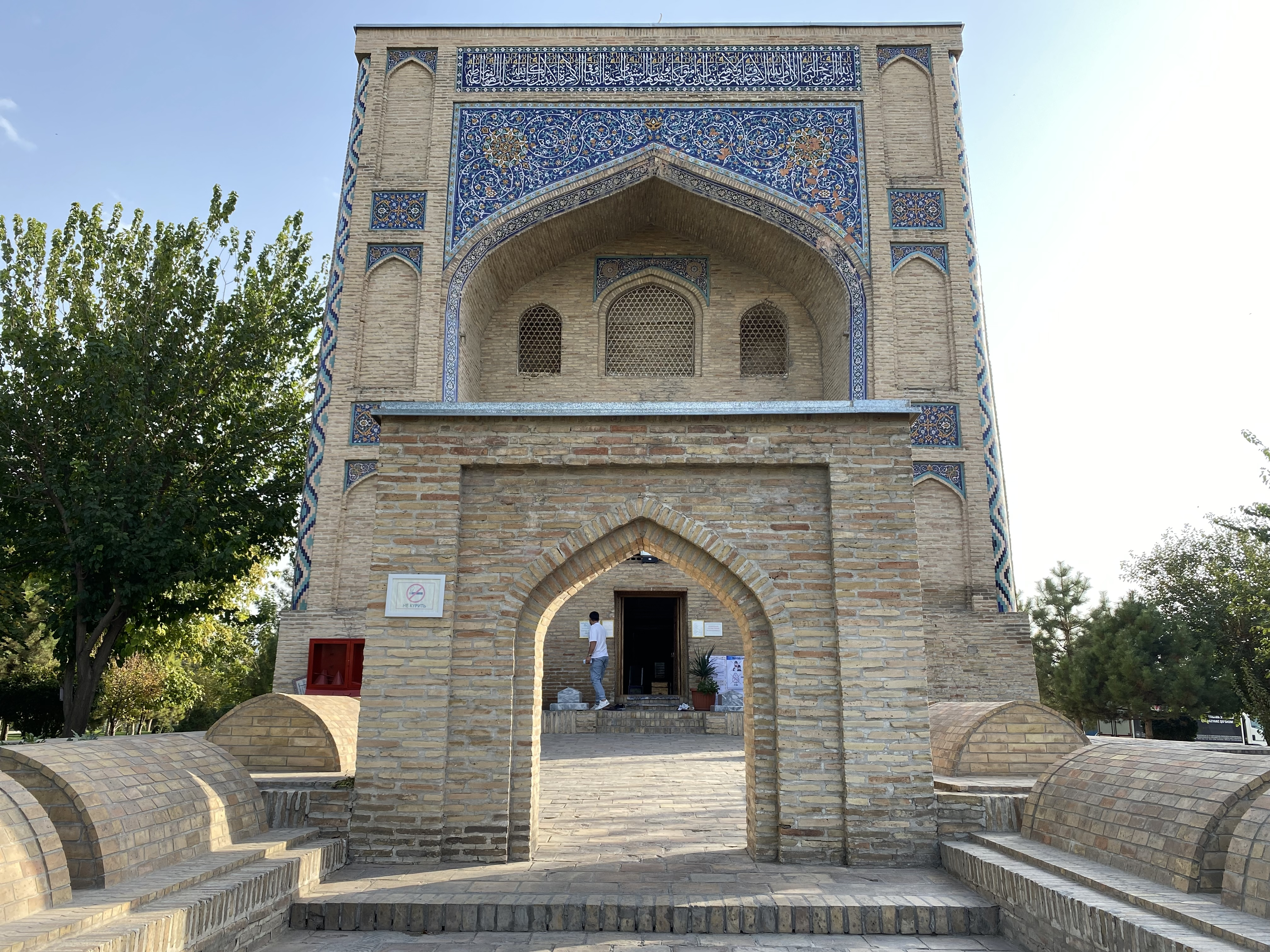
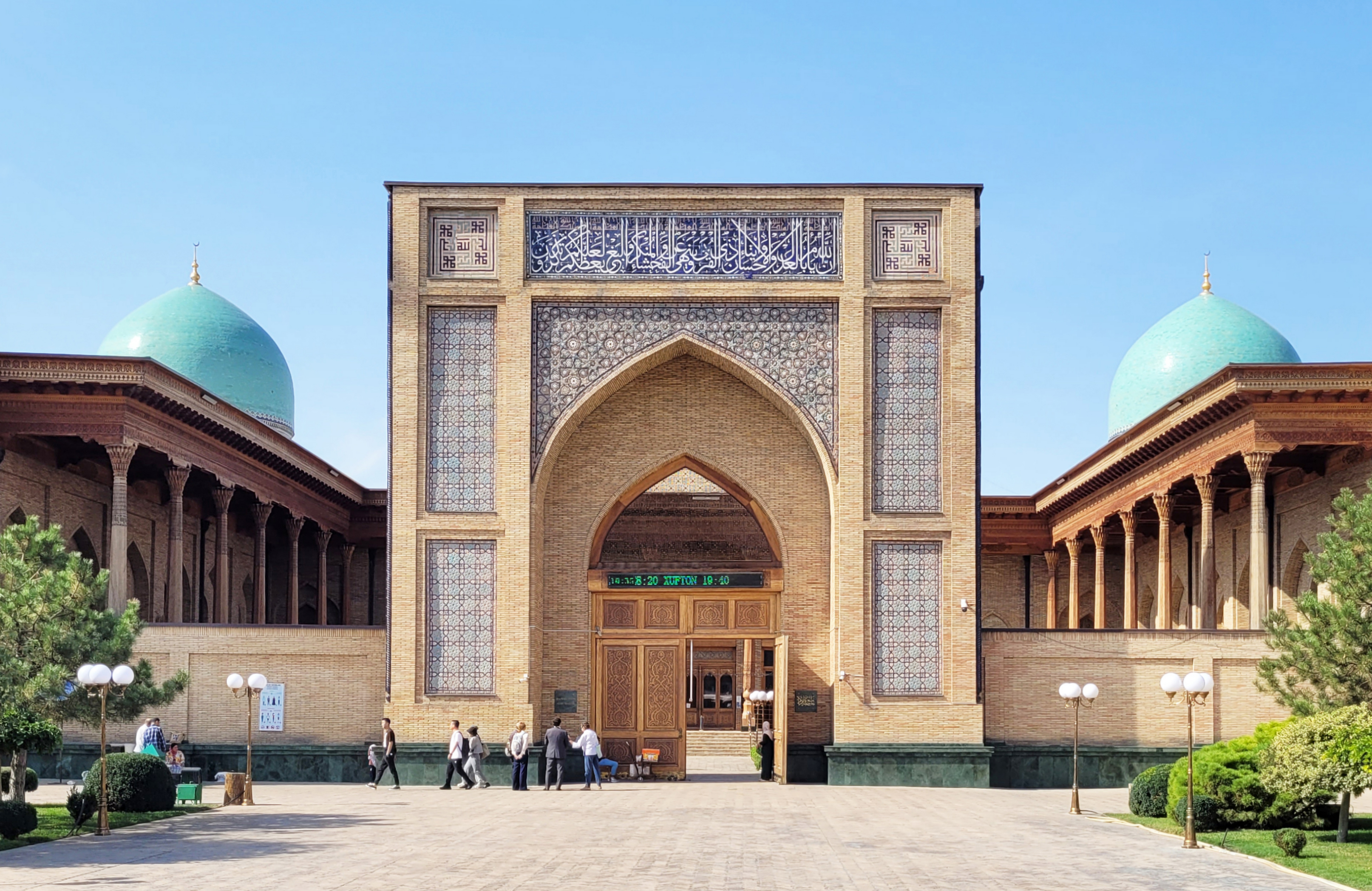
Baroqxon, Moʻyi Muborak madrasahs, Hazrati Imam mosque and Qaffol Shoshiy mausoleum.

The Qaffol Shoshiy mausoleum was built of baked bricks by the architect Gʻulom Husayn in the 16th century (1541–1542). The mausoleum was named after Abu Bakr Muhammad ibn Ali Ismoil Qaffol ash Shoshiy.

=== Moʻyi Muborak madrasa ===
The Moʻyi Muborak madrasa was built of burnt bricks by the Tashkent ruler Mirzo Ahmad qushbegi in 1856–1857 in the Hazrati Imam complex of Tashkent, during the rule of the Ming dynasty. Today, this madrasa houses the ancient Qurʻon (Usmon Mus'haf), which was written in hijazi script on deer skin during the caliphate of Usmon (644–656) and created in 644–648. This sacred Qurʻon is considered one of the rarest manuscripts and was brought from Syria by Amir Temur in the 14th century. There is a 7x6 meter tomb in the middle of the courtyard, covered with a dome and cells. The madrasa consisted of 13 cells and a mosque.

=== Hazrati Imam Jome Mosque ===
The Hazrati Imam Jome Mosque was built in 2007 on the initiative of the President of the Republic of Uzbekistan Islam Karimov. It was registered by the Justice Department on December 27, 2007. The mosque serves the "Hazrati Imam", "Shoshiy", "Istiqlol" and "Namuna" neighborhoods. The length of the vaulted hall is 77 meters, the width is 22 meters, and if added with the mihrab, it is 24 meters. The domes are 35 meters high and 25 meters wide. The mosque has 14 large and 48 small lamps, and a dome-shaped like an elongated ellipse is installed in the center of the hall. There are two minarets in the mosque, one of which was built by the masters Ibrahim and Erkin from Khorezm, and the other by the master Sharif and his team from Samarkand. One of the minarets was completed in 26 days and the other in 28 days. The height of the minarets is 52 meters. The columns in the courtyard are made of sandalwood brought from India, and have a height of 8.6 meters and are decorated with carvings.

=== Imam al-Bukhari Islamic Institute ===
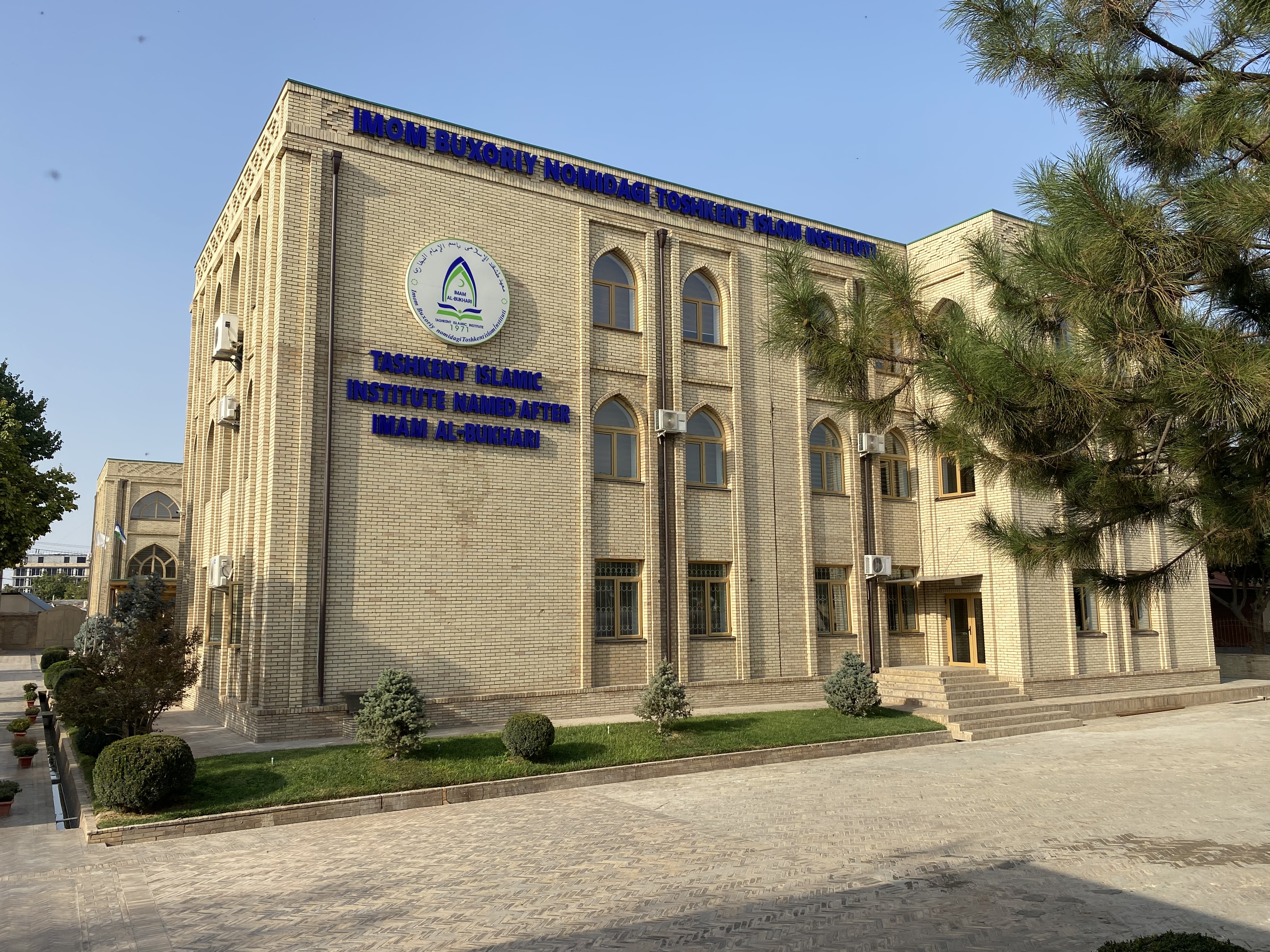
View of Imam al-Bukhari Islamic Institute

The Tashkent Islamic Institute named after Imam Bukhari was established in 1969. It is under the supervision of the Administration of Muslims of Uzbekistan. It was rebuilt by the resolution of the Council for Religious Affairs under the Council of Ministers of the Soviet Union on opening a higher-level madrasa in Tashkent. The building of the "Namazgoh" mosque in Hazrati Imam area (Hamza, now Zarqaynar street, 18-berk street, 47-house) was allocated for the madrasa. On November 1, 1971 (the 12th day of Ramadan in 1391 according to the Hijri calendar), the higher madrasa started its activity.

The study period at the higher madrasa is 4 years, and the classes are conducted in Uzbek and Arabic languages. Twenty students were admitted to the institute (maʼhad) in the first academic year. The educational institution was initially called "Higher Religious Madrasa" (Visshaya duxovnaya shkola, Russian: Высшая духовная школа). In 1974, on the occasion of the 1200th anniversary of Imam Bukhari's birth, the name of the scholar was given to this educational institution and it was called "Higher Maʼhad", "Tashkent Islamic Institute".

Since 2003, by the decree of the Cabinet of Ministers of the Republic of Uzbekistan, bachelor's diplomas are awarded to the graduates of the institute. In 2007, a new two-story building of the institute was built. In 2021, a four-story building with 27 rooms for students and a 45-person ablution room, as well as a third floor with 17 classrooms, a conference hall and an information-resource center were added to the two-story main building of the institute.

In March 2026, the Center for Islamic Civilization was opened next door, featuring a museum, research institute, library, center for traditional crafts, and educational facilities. The Samarkand Codex was transferred to the center in November 2025.

== Architecture ==
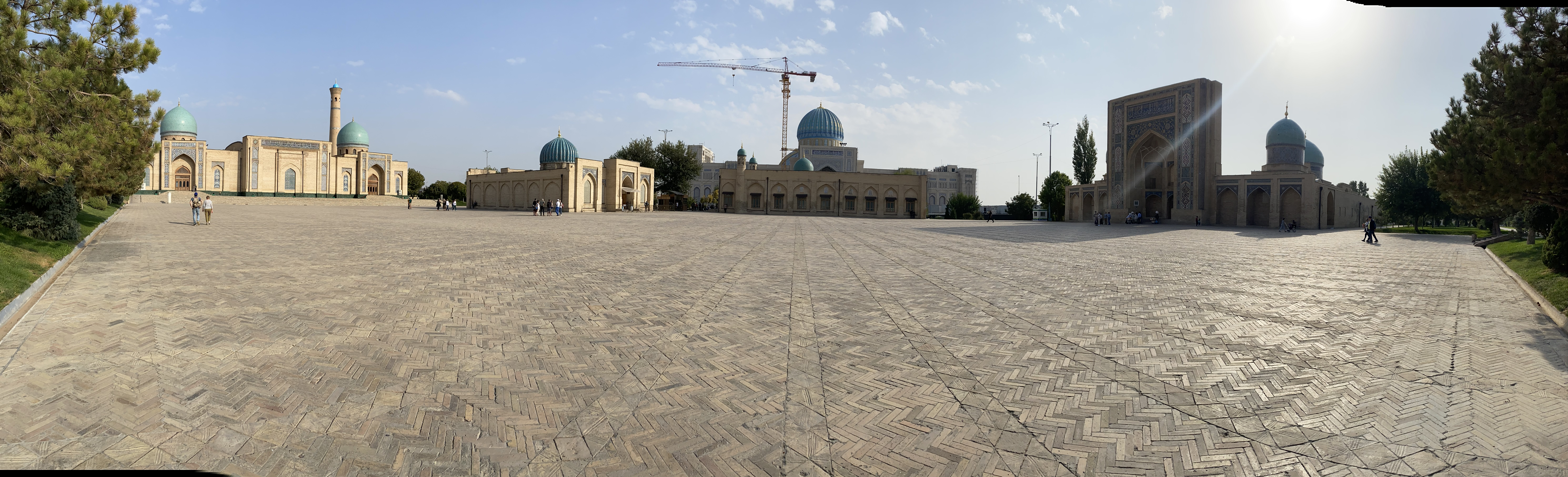
Hazrati Imam Complex (wide image)

The appearance of the Hazrati Imam complex was created based on ancient traditions, and the complex consists of two domes and two minarets. The right minaret was built by the Khorezmian masters Ibrohim and Erkin, and the left minaret was built by a group of craftsmen led by Sharif usta from Samarkand. The minarets are 53 meters high. There is a portico with 20 columns made of sandalwood at the entrance of the mosque. The domes have a special design that allows the sun rays to illuminate the mosque from dawn to dusk. The interior of the two domes is covered with gold leaf. In the 16th century, a garden, porticoes and a pool were built in the complex, and the pool was decorated with blue tiles, and folk festivals were held.

The inscriptions in the Hazrati Imam complex were written by Shayx Abdulaziz Mansur under the editorship of Habibulloh Solih, Islombek Muhammad and Abdulgʻofur Xaqberdi. Wooden doors leading to the mosque wings on the right and left sides of the pedestals, and to the juma courtyard in the middle, are installed under the pedestals. The khanqah is 77 meters long and 22 meters wide, and 24 meters if counted with the mihrab. The wings are 35 meters long and 25 meters wide.

== Description ==
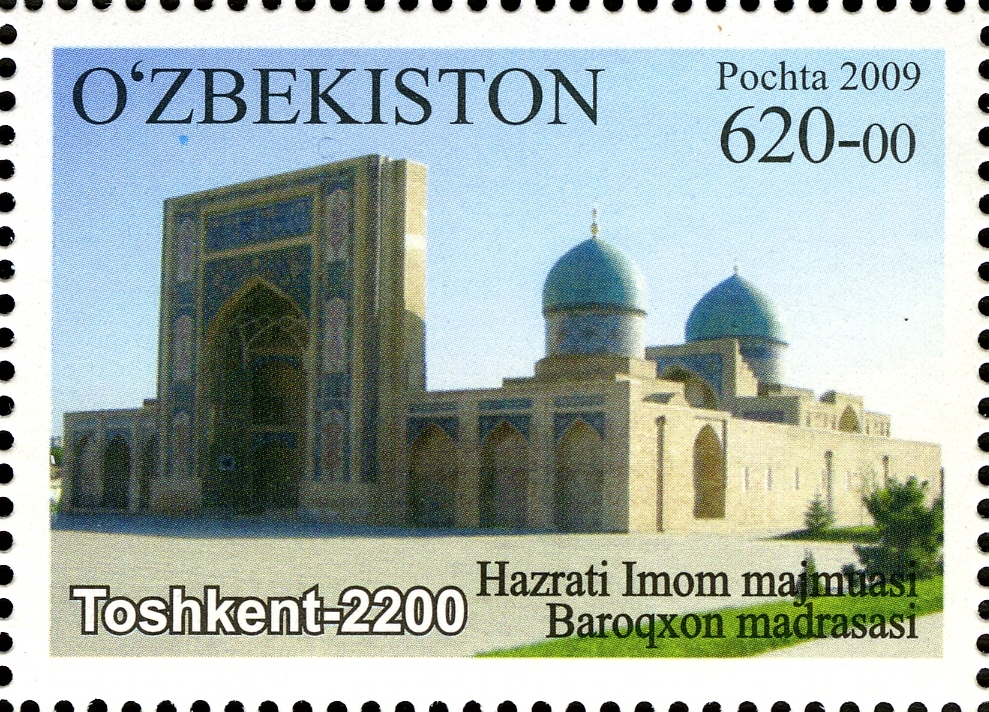
Hazrati Imam Complex postage stamp (2009)

In 2007, the mufti of the Administration of Muslims of Uzbekistan, Usmonxon Alimov, wrote a book about the Hazrati Imam complex. The book contains information about the streets, neighborhoods and the Moʻyi Muborak madrasa, the Qaffol Shoshiy mausoleum, the Baroqxon madrasa, the Hazrati Imam juma mosque, and the Tillashayx mosques of the Old City of Tashkent.

On the eve of the 2200th anniversary of Tashkent city, postage stamps were issued depicting architectural monuments and buildings in Tashkent that combine ancient and modern architectural traditions.

The stamps are in the form of small sheets, consisting of 8 stamps in total. The stamps include the Tashkent International Business Center, the Senate building, the Oliy Majlis building, the Turkiston Palace, the Temuriylar History State Museum, the Hazrati Imam complex, the Qatagʻon Martyrs Memorial Museum, the Baroqxon madrasa and a fragment of the Great Silk Road map. The stamps were put into circulation on August 17, 2009.

Based on the decree of the President of the Republic of Uzbekistan of 2007 "On supporting the Hazrati Imam (Hastimom) public association" PQ-587, the Ministry of Finance of the Republic of Uzbekistan was instructed to allocate 500 million soums from the treasury of the Cabinet of Ministers to support the activities of the Hazrati Imam public association.

== Bibliography ==
- Usmonxon Alimov (2008). Hazrati Imom (in Uzbek). Tashkent: Movarounnahr. p. 144. ISBN 978-9943-12-105-8.
- Davlat ilmiy nashriyoti (2009). National Encyclopedia of Uzbekistan (in Uzbek). Tashkent. p. 252.
