= Sabriya (TV series) =

Uzbek TV-series

- Genre: Drama
- Screenplay by: Utkirbek Kakhorov and Durdona Urokova
- Directed by: Tursunova Nasiba
- Starring: Shirinabonu Sotvoldiyeva; Jahongir Abdumuminovich; Nasiba Tursunova; Fatkhulla Masudov; Gulkhumor Abdullayeva
- Theme music composer: Khamdam Sobirov
- Opening theme: Dildora Niyozova
- Ending theme: Ozoda Nursaidova
- Composer: Khamdam Sobirov
- Country of origin: Uzbekistan
- Original language: Uzbek
- No. of seasons: 1
- No. of episodes: 37

Production
- Producer: Davlat Rashidov
- Production locations: Tashkent and Tashkent Region
- Running time: 40 mins
- Production company: Sevimli TV

Original release
- Release: 30 November 2021 – 23 January 2022

Sabriya is an Uzbek TV-series that was premiered on 30 November 2021 on SevimliTV.

== Cast ==
Actors	Characters
Shirinabonu Sotvoldiyeva	Sabriya
Jahongir Abdumuminovich	Doston
Anvar Azimov	Mahmud the rich
Gulhumor Abdullayev	Saida
Nasiba Tursunova	Shaydo
Fathula Ma'sudov	Ismoil
Gavhkhar Zakirova	Mahmud's wife
Ma'rufkhon Muhammedov	Sirojiddin
Zufar Raimov	Ibrohim
Nodirbek Uzoqov	Nizom

== General view ==
Season	Number of Episodes	Original release dates		
Season	Number of Episodes	Start date	End date	Channel
1	37	30 November 2021	21 January 2022	Sevimli TV

== Episodes ==
Episode	Directed by	Screenplay by	Release date	Ratings (TOTAL)
Episode 1	Nasiba Tursunova	Utkirbek Kakhorov	30 November 2021	4.33
Episode 2	Nasiba Tursunova	Utkirbek Kakhorov	1 December 2021	3.75
Episode 3	Nasiba Tursunova	Utkirbek Kakhorov	2 December 2021	4.74
Episode 4	Nasiba Tursunova	Utkirbek Kakhorov	3 December 2021	4.90
Episode 5	Nasiba Tursunova	Utkirbek Kakhorov	6 December 2021	3.13
Episode 6	Nasiba Tursunova	Utkirbek Kakhorov	7 December 2021	3.66
Episode 7	Nasiba Tursunova	Utkirbek Kakhorov	8 December 2021	4.26
Episode 8	Nasiba Tursunova	Utkirbek Kakhorov	9 December 2021	4.38
Episode 9	Nasiba Tursunova	Utkirbek Kakhorov	10 December 2021	4.64
Episode 10	Nasiba Tursunova	Utkirbek Kakhorov	13 December 2021	4.93
Episode 11	Nasiba Tursunova	Utkirbek Kakhorov	14 December 2021	4.90
Episode 12	Nasiba Tursunova	Utkirbek Kakhorov	15 December 2021	5.95
Episode 13	Nasiba Tursunova	Utkirbek Kakhorov	16 December 2021	5.90
Episode 14	Nasiba Tursunova	Utkirbek Kakhorov	17 December 2021	5.70
Episode 15	Nasiba Tursunova	Utkirbek Kakhorov	20 December 2021	3.80
Episode 16	Nasiba Tursunova	Utkirbek Kakhorov	21 December 2021	4.00
Episode 17	Nasiba Tursunova	Utkirbek Kakhorov	22 December 2021	4.80
Episode 18	Nasiba Tursunova	Utkirbek Kakhorov	23 December 2021	4.10
Episode 19	Nasiba Tursunova	Utkirbek Kakhorov	24 December 2021	4.40
Episode 20	Nasiba Tursunova	Utkirbek Kakhorov	27 December 2021	4.00
Episode 21	Nasiba Tursunova	Utkirbek Kakhorov	28 December 2021	4.20
Episode 22	Nasiba Tursunova	Utkirbek Kakhorov	29 December 2021	3.60
Episode 23	Nasiba Tursunova	Utkirbek Kakhorov	30 December 2021	2.90
Episode 24	Nasiba Tursunova	Utkirbek Kakhorov	4 January 2022	4.75
Episode 25	Nasiba Tursunova	Durdona Urokova	5 January 2022	2.97
Episode 26	Nasiba Tursunova	Durdona Urokova	6 January 2022	4.29
Episode 27	Nasiba Tursunova	Durdona Urokova	7 January 2022	3.81
Episode 28	Nasiba Tursunova	Durdona Urokova	10 January 2022	4.27
Episode 29	Nasiba Tursunova	Durdona Urokova	11 January 2022	5.03
Episode 30	Nasiba Tursunova	Durdona Urokova	12 January 2022	4.50
Episode 31	Nasiba Tursunova	Durdona Urokova	13 January 2022	3.04
Episode 32	Nasiba Tursunova	Durdona Urokova	14 January 2022	2.93
Episode 33	Nasiba Tursunova	Durdona Urokova	17 January 2022	3.12
Episode 34	Nasiba Tursunova	Durdona Urokova	18 January 2022	3.42
Episode 35	Nasiba Tursunova	Durdona Urokova	19 January 2022	4.68
Episode 36	Nasiba Tursunova	Durdona Urokova	20 January 2022	4.04
Episode 37. Final	Nasiba Tursunova	Durdona Urokova	21 January 2022	3.70

== Reviews ==
Saida Mirziyoyeva, deputy chairwoman of the Board of Trustees of the Public Foundation for Support and Development of National Mass media, Member of the Commission on Ensuring Gender Equality of the Republic of Uzbekistan, said,

"I will use my viewer's right to express my attitude towards the drama Sabriya. I'm sure there isn't a single woman among the creators of the drama. Because I've never seen so much hate for women in a script in any movie. It is not clear why the plot contains complete and correct instructions for taking drugs? In this case, no consequences are presented. The most unpleasant and disgusting are the scenes of violence against women; and as the only way out of the situation - to commit suicide. "Excellent" recommendation!

Feature films are one of the ways to shape the modern agenda in society. We are making incredible efforts to ensure that gender equality and respect for women will become the norm in our society. Each of us, the owner of the audience, has a great responsibility for this word. However, such serials hinder the development of gender equality. There are no solid thoughts in them, only painful fantasies about the life of Uzbekistan.

Our women do not deserve such an attitude from the cinema. Neither private nor general!"

Amira Rashidova, one of the producers of Sevimli TV, commented

“Only one trailer was distributed. In a joint trailer, a drug addict tries to inflict violence on a woman. In this trailer, the director filmed the episode without blood, body exposure, and physical violence. No explicit violence or vulgar scenes are shown. According to the scenario, the criminal in the same episode receives punishment for his actions. We don't live in a time where we can't show bad people, they are still exist. Many scenes of the series are taken from real life.

I am against all forms of violence against women.

SevimliTV marks the series as "+16" and It is enough to watch 3 more minutes to understand the end of the movie before the accusations of "immorality". This series is the first work of the director Nasiba Tursunova. Like many filmmakers, SevimliTV supported her and expressed its confidence. We are considering collaborating with her in the future, I am against offending the artist..."

Firdavs Abdukhalikov, General Director of Uzbekistan Cinematography Agency, said:

"Sabriya series, which has been broadcast on SevimliTV channel, is really not very artistic and content. Despite being one of the director's first works of art, it turned out that the television's arts council did not provide the necessary advice and practical assistance.."
