= Samarkand Kufic Quran =

Uzbek Quran manuscript (dated 765–855)

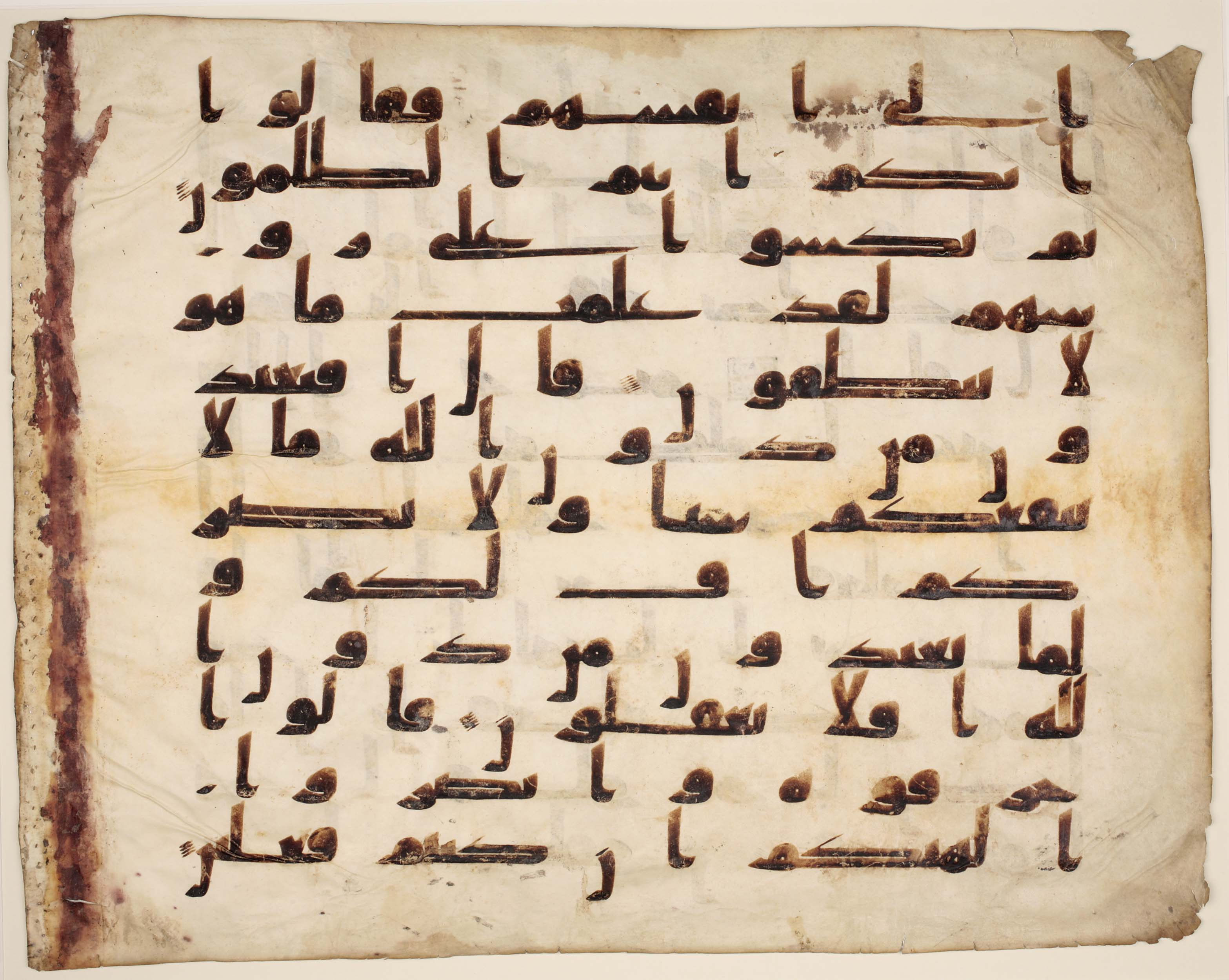
Folio in the Khalili Collection of Islamic Art

The Samarkand Kufic Quran (also known as the Mushaf Uthmani, Samarkand codex, Tashkent Quran and Quran of Uthman) is a Quranic manuscript, or mushaf. It is one of the oldest surviving Quran manuscripts in the world, although its exact dating is uncertain. Tradition holds that the caliph Uthman ibn Affan oversaw the compilation of the first canonical version of the Quranic text, ordering all divergent manuscripts burned. The Samarkand codex is one of several that purport to be the copy that Uthman retained for his personal use and was martyred upon, staining the pages with his blood. Modern studies have suggested various dates for its production ranging from the 7th to 10th centuries.

In 1868, during the Russian imperial conquest of Central Asia, the Quran was coercively removed from the Khoja Ahrar madrassa in Samarkand and taken to the Imperial Public Library in Saint Petersburg. The Bolsheviks agreed to "repatriate" the Quran to Muslim organizations successively in Ufa in 1917 and Tashkent in 1923, representing one of the earliest cases in world history of formerly colonized peoples reclaiming cultural property taken under imperial duress on the principle of decolonization. Today, about a third of the manuscript is kept in the Center for Islamic Civilization while other pages are held in various collections around the world.

== Dating the manuscript ==
Based on orthographic and palaeographic studies, the manuscript probably dates from the 8th or 9th century. Radiocarbon dating showed a 95.4% confidence interval for a date between 775 and 995. However, one of the folios from another manuscript (held in the Religious Administration of Muslims in Tashkent) was dated to between 595 and 855 AD with a likelihood of 95%. Another study of the folios at the Museum of Islamic Art, Doha, has proposed that the manuscript was produced in the reign of Abbasid caliph al-Mahdi (r. 775–785).

== History ==
=== Tradition vs scholarship ===
The copy of the Quran is traditionally considered to be the third caliph Uthman's personal copy from a group of codexes he commissioned. According to Islamic tradition, in 651, 19 years after the death of the Islamic Prophet, Muhammad, Uthman commissioned a committee to produce a standard copy of the text of the Quran (see Origin and development of the Quran). According to one report, six certified copies were written, of which five were dispatched to various parts of the Islamic world, with the sixth being for Uthman's personal use in Medina, which was later stained with his blood during his assassination. Each copy dispatched was accompanied by a reciter. These include: Zayd ibn Thabit (sent to Madinah), Abdullah ibn al-Sa'ib (sent to Makkah), al-Mughirah ibn Shihab (sent to Syria), Amir ibn Abd Qays (sent to Basra) and Abdul Rahman al-Sulami (sent to Kufa). The only other surviving copy was thought to be the one held in Topkapı Palace in Turkey, but studies have shown that the Topkapı manuscript is also not from the 7th century, but from much later.

According to competing narratives circulating in 19th century Turkestan, the Quran was brought from Istanbul to Samarkand by the murids of Khoja Ahrar, a Naqshbandi sufi master, or by Amir Timur as a war trophy from his conquests in Western Asia.

=== Certified history ===
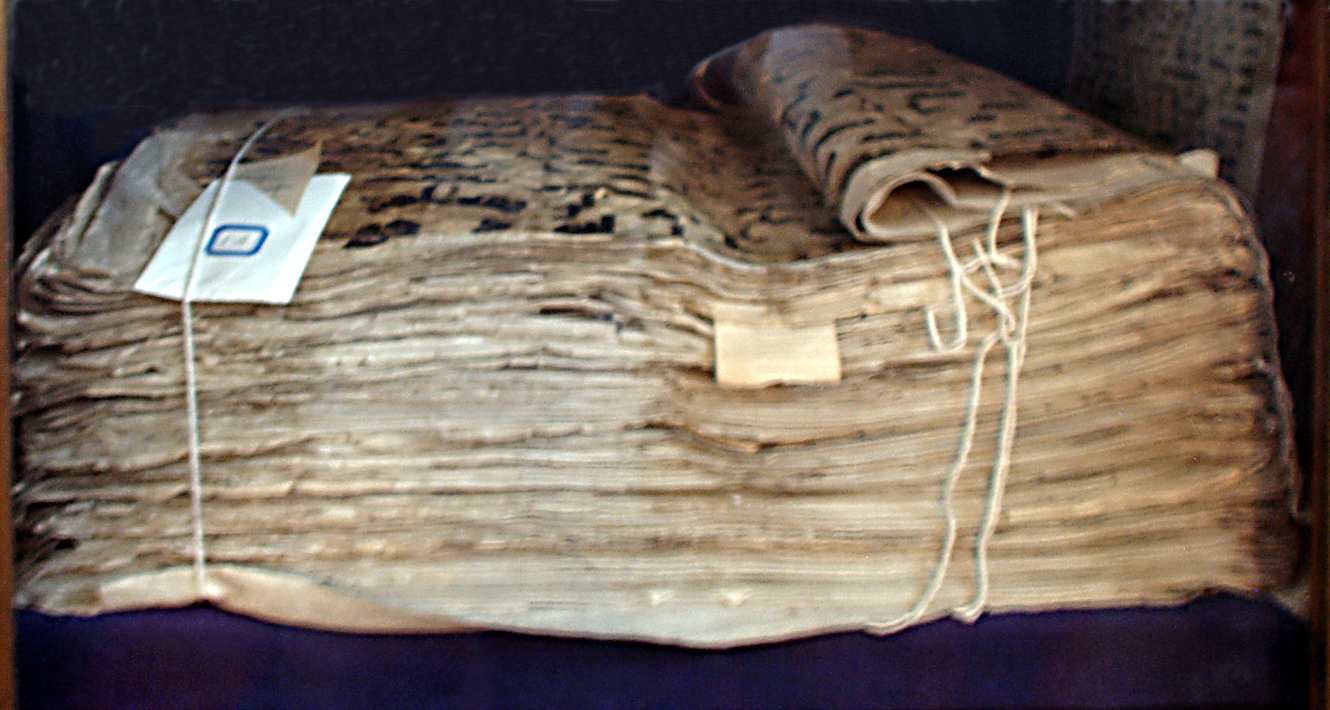
The Samarkand manuscript, now kept in Tashkent

After the Russians conquered Samarkand in the 1868, Russian Major General Abramov forcibly removed the Quran from the madrassa of Khoja Ahrar, despite the local ulama's attempt to prevent this by evacuating the manuscript to Bukhara, and sent it to the Imperial Library in Saint Petersburg (now the Russian National Library). In a manner typical of European colonists in the nineteenth century, Konstantin Petrovich von Kaufmann, the first Governor-General of Russian Turkestan, claimed that the present-day inhabitants of Samarkand did not value the Quran nor understand its extreme rarity and antiquity, while Russian newspapers celebrated the Quran's removal to Saint Petersburg as the salvation of a great "antiquity, invaluable to science."

While at the Imperial Library, the Samarkand Quran, previously only a locally-recognized Central Asian relic, became known and recognized as authentic by a multi-ethnic audience of Muslims from across the Russian empire. It also attracted the attention of Russian Orientalists and eventually the merchant Semen Pisarev and academic Vasilii Uspenskii produced fifty full-scale lithographic facsimiles in 1905, copies of which were gifted to Russian Minister of Foreign Affairs Count Vladimir Nikolaevich Lamsdorf, Ottoman Sultan Abdul Hamid II, Persian Shah Muzaffar al-Din, and Tsar Nicholas II. Pisarev and Uspenskii also attempted to restore with fresh ink the faded folios, introducing unintentional alterations into the text.

After the February Revolution, the National Assembly of the Muslims of Inner Russia and Siberia unsuccessfully petitioned the Provisional Government to transfer the Quran to them. Following the October Revolution, representatives of the assembly met with Joseph Stalin, who agreed to "return" the relic to them, a decision approved by Vladimir Lenin and Anatoly Lunacharsky in December 1917. In January 1918, the Quran was moved to the National Assembly's capital at Ufa, the long-standing seat of the Orenburg Muslim Spiritual Assembly. In 1921, the All-Russian Central Executive Committee heard a request from the Commissariat for Nationalities sponsored by organizations in Tashkent associated with the Jadid Islamic enlightenment movement, and in July 1923 ordered the "transfer of the Quran, extracted from Turkestan by the Tsarist government, into the possession of the Muslims of Turkestan." The Quran arrived in Tashkent on 9 August, after which it was kept in the Muslim-run Tashkent Old-Town Museum until 1927, when it was removed from public view. In 1941, the Quran was transferred to the Museum of the History of the Peoples of Uzbekistan, where it was kept in storage while its facsimile was displayed in an anti-religious exhibition. In March 1989, the Quran was transferred to the control of the Spiritual Administration of the Muslims of Central Asia and Kazakhstan and placed in the Hazrati Imam Complex. In November 2025, it was moved to the new Center for Islamic Civilization, purpose-built next door.

=== Recognition ===
In 1997, UNESCO added the section of manuscript held in Tashkent to its Memory of the World International Register, recognising it as a globally important document. The nominating statement stressed the Quran's status both as a profoundly influential religious text and as a piece of Arabic literature.

== Current state ==
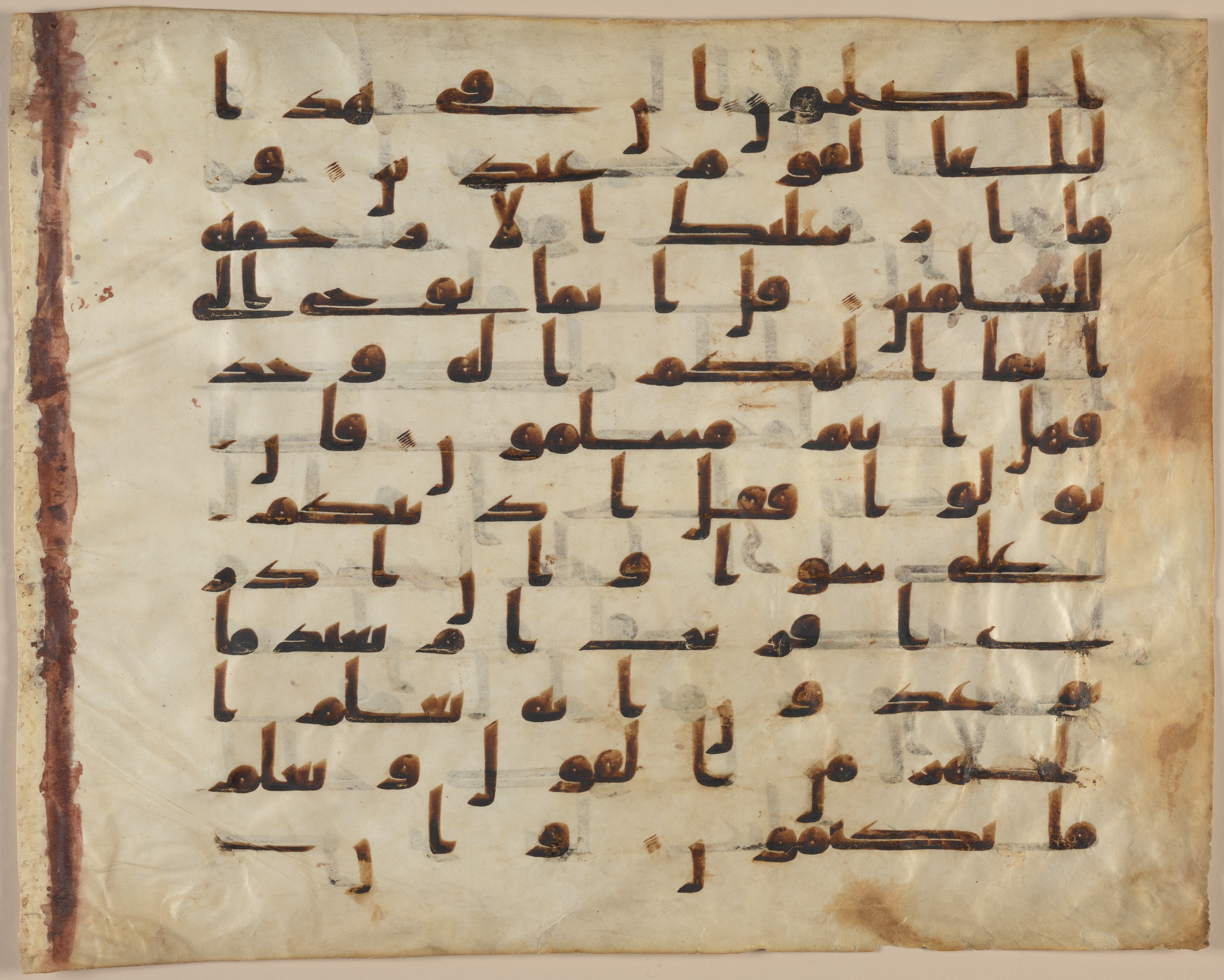
Folio in the Metropolitan Museum of Art

In addition to the codex kept in the Center for Islamic Civilization in Tashkent, Uzbekistan, individual surviving leaves of the manuscript are held in collections and museums around the world. At least one folio, with text from Sura 21 (Al-Anbiy), is kept at the Metropolitan Museum of Art in New York. Another folio with text from same sura is part of the Khalili Collection of Islamic Art. One or more folios are displayed in the Aga Khan Museum in Toronto. Some folios are housed at the Museum of Islamic Art in Doha.

== Description ==
The manuscript is the largest, or one of the largest, known Quran manuscripts written on parchment. Two illuminated folios from the manuscript have survived, preserved in collections in Paris and Gotha. Apart from these two pages, the rest of the manuscript is not illuminated and the script lacks the vowel diacritics that were used in later manuscripts to assist readers in pronunciation. The script used is in an early version of Kufic script, with some details resembling the even older Hijazi script. There are twelve lines per page. The quality of the calligraphy suggests it was an important or expensive commission.
