= Islamic Civilization Center =

Educational center in Uzbekistan

- Islom sivilizatsiyasi markazi
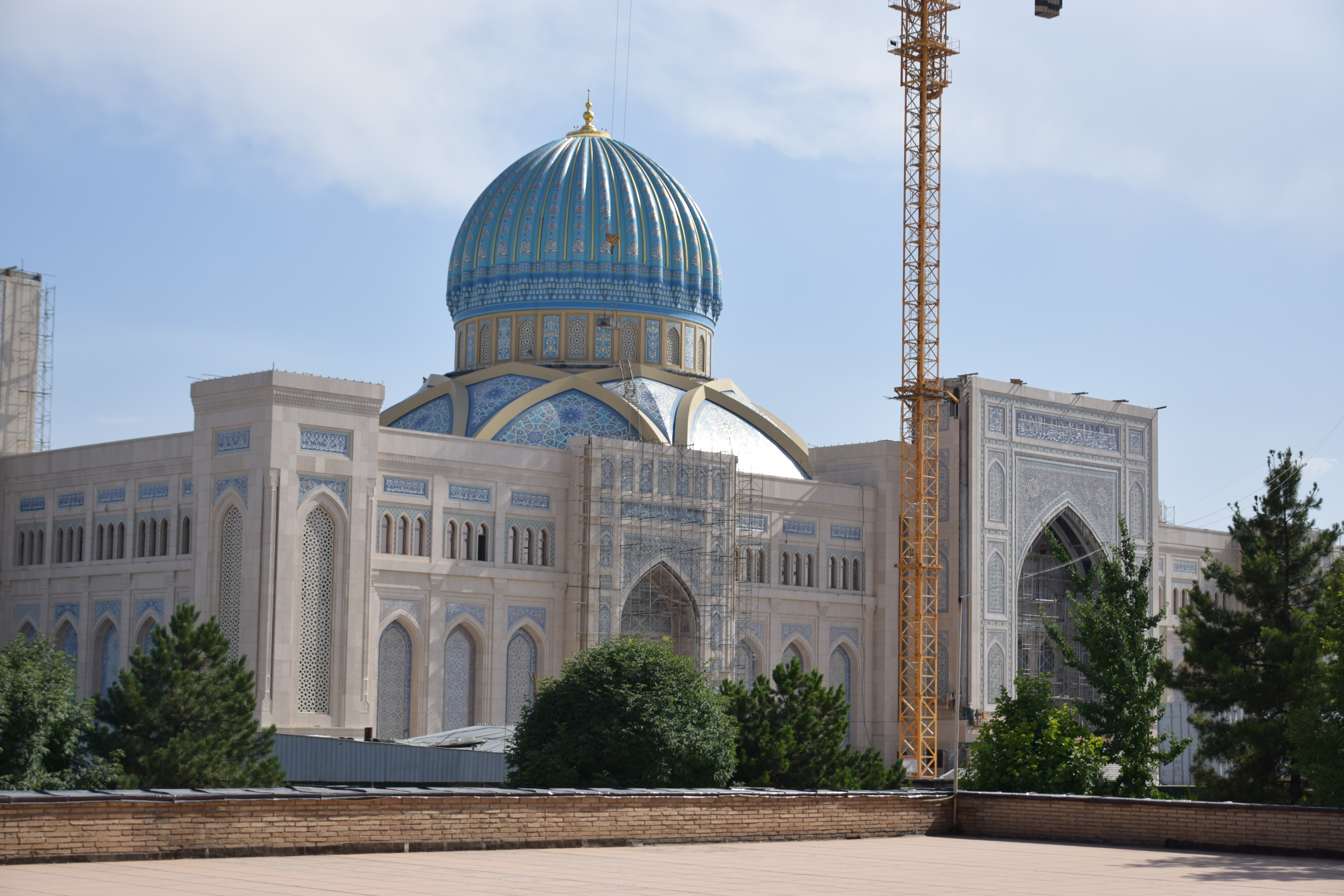
- Abbreviation: ISCIC
- Formation: 2017
- Established: 2025
- Headquarters: Tashkent, Uzbekistan
- Location: Karasaray street, 89A
- Official language: Uzbek
- Director: Firdavs Abdukhalikov
- Website: https://cisc.uz/

The Islamic Civilization Center (ICC) (Uzbek: Islom sivilizatsiyasi markazi) is the largest cultural, scientific, and educational complex in Uzbekistan. It houses a museum, a research institute, libraries, international partner organizations, scientific laboratories, centers of traditional crafts, and educational departments. The centerpiece of the museum is the Samarkand Kufic Quran, one of the oldest surviving Quran manuscripts in the world which claims to be the personal copy that the third caliph Uthman ibn Affan was martyred upon.

The goal of the Center is to provide a comprehensive study of the history of Uzbekistan from ancient times to the modern period, with a focus on the region’s contribution to world civilization in the fields of science, culture, and spiritual heritage. Special attention is given to the scientific legacy of Uzbek scholars, the study of their works, as well as contemporary academic research and new discoveries.

== History ==
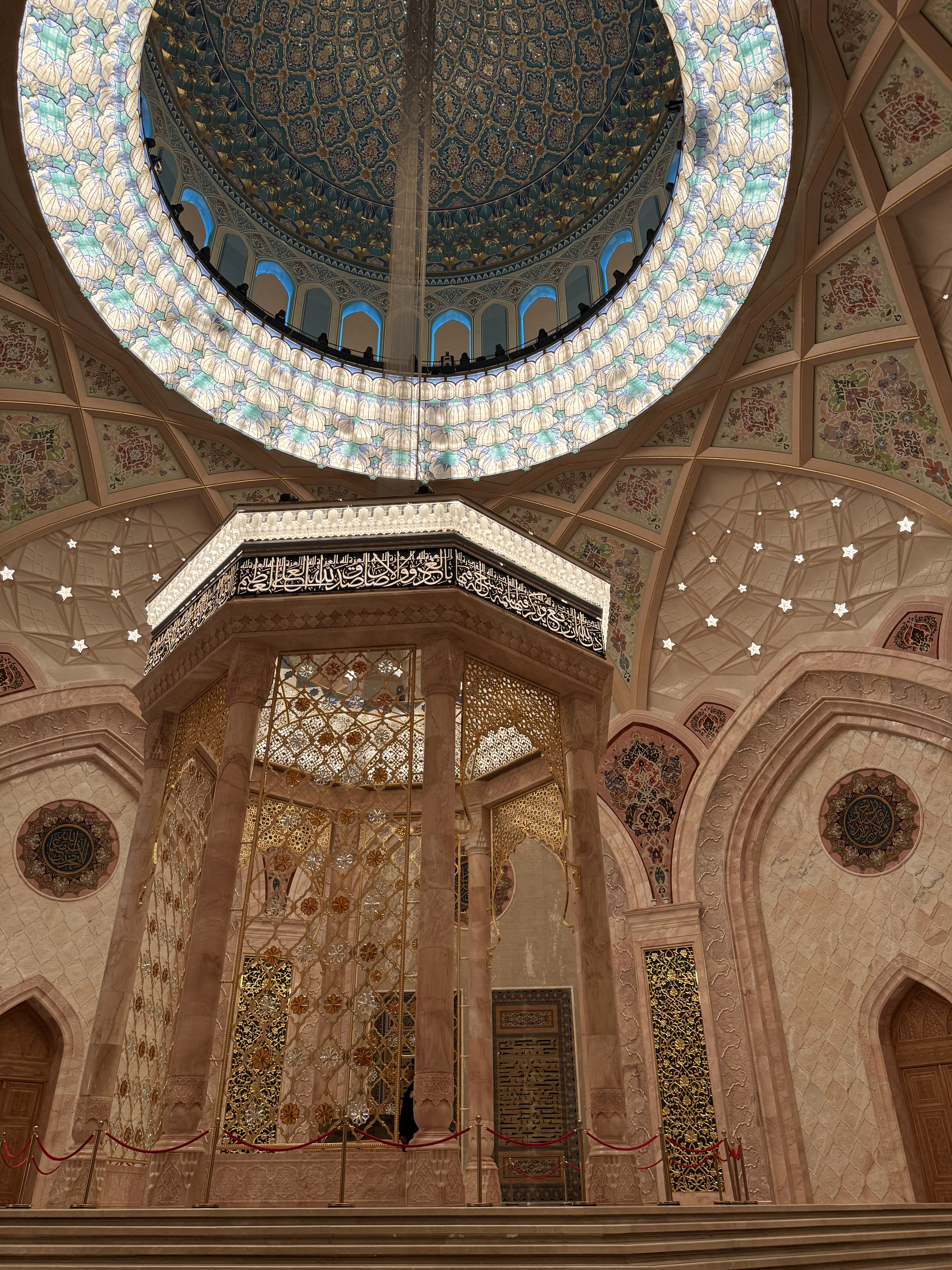
The Quran hall in the museum where the Samarkand Kufic Quran is located

The Center was an initiative of the president of Uzbekistan Shavkat Mirziyoyev who envisaged it as a vehicle to scientifically substantiate the greatness of Islamic civilization and portray Islam as a religion of "goodness, peace and tolerance."

Mirziyoyev formally announced the establishment of the Center for Islamic Culture in June 2017. Later, he proposed renaming it the Center for Islamic Civilization.

The major benefactor of the project was Alisher Usmanov, an Uzbek billionaire and philanthropist, who not only financed the construction but also donated a collection of rare and valuable books.

In July 2021, President Mirziyoyev hailed the Center as a scientific and educational institution that would highlight Uzbekistan's role in the cultural heritage of the region. Among its missions would be to establish libraries and train guides and translators. The Center for Islamic Civilization will cooperate with UNESCO, ISESCO and other international organizations. The ICESCO Manuscripts Center will be housed there. The center will have four thematic galleries focusing on Pre-Islamic Heritage, the First Renaissance (8th–13th centuries), the Second Renaissance (15th century) and Modern Uzbekistan.

In preparation for the opening, ancient manuscripts and objects directly related to the history and culture of Uzbekistan were purchased from antique dealers, private collectors and international auction houses such as Christie's and Sotheby's. In May 2025, a collection of Seljuk-era jewellery that was up for auction at Christie's was purchased by the center. The collection includes 35 handcrafted rings, earrings, bracelets, chains and clasps.

At the opening ceremony of the UNESCO General Conference, hosted by Uzbekistan in October 2025, Mirziyoyev invited other nations to collaborate in the work of the center "to advance tolerance, enlightenment and interfaith harmony."

In September 2025, Paolo Zampolli, the United States special envoy for global partnerships visited the Center in Tashkent on his first official visit to Uzbekistan.

In November 2025, Kassym-Jomart Tokayev, Ilham Aliyev, Sadyr Zhaparov, and Emomali Rahmon (leaders of Kazakhstan, Azerbaijan, Kyrgyzstan and Tajikistan) joined Mirziyoyev in a visit to the Center.

The Center was officially opened in March 2026 in the presence of the President Shavkat Mirziyoyev.

== Design and architecture ==
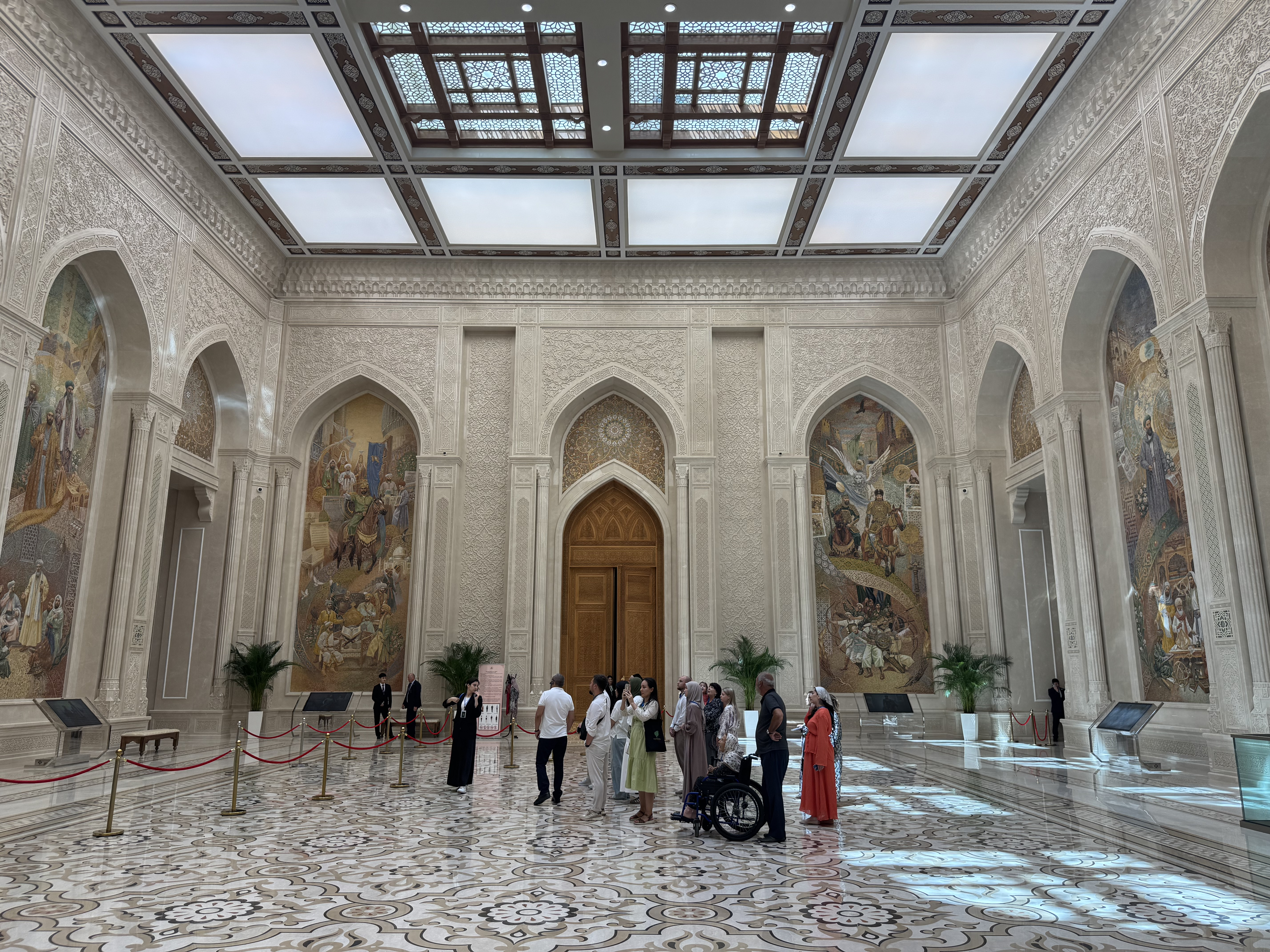
Hall of Honor

On September 1, 2017, Mirziyoyev visited the Khazrati Imam complex to view the site chosen for the project. A plot of land of about 10 hectares was allocated next to the complex. Mirziyoyev personally laid the cornerstone on June 15, 2018. The length of the three-story building of the Islamic Civilization Center is 145 meters, the width is 115 meters. The height of the central dome is 65 meters. At least $161.8 million was allocated for the construction of the building. The construction was supposed to be completed by the beginning of 2024, but work on the project remains ongoing.

The first floor will house a research center, a data digitization and restoration laboratory, a storage fund for museum exhibits and rare manuscripts. A museum with an exhibition hall of about 15,000 square meters is planned for the second floor. Various exhibits of the cultural heritage of the Islamic world will be displayed in thematic order. A library housing 100,000 manuscripts and their digital copies will be located on the third floor.

== Museum ==
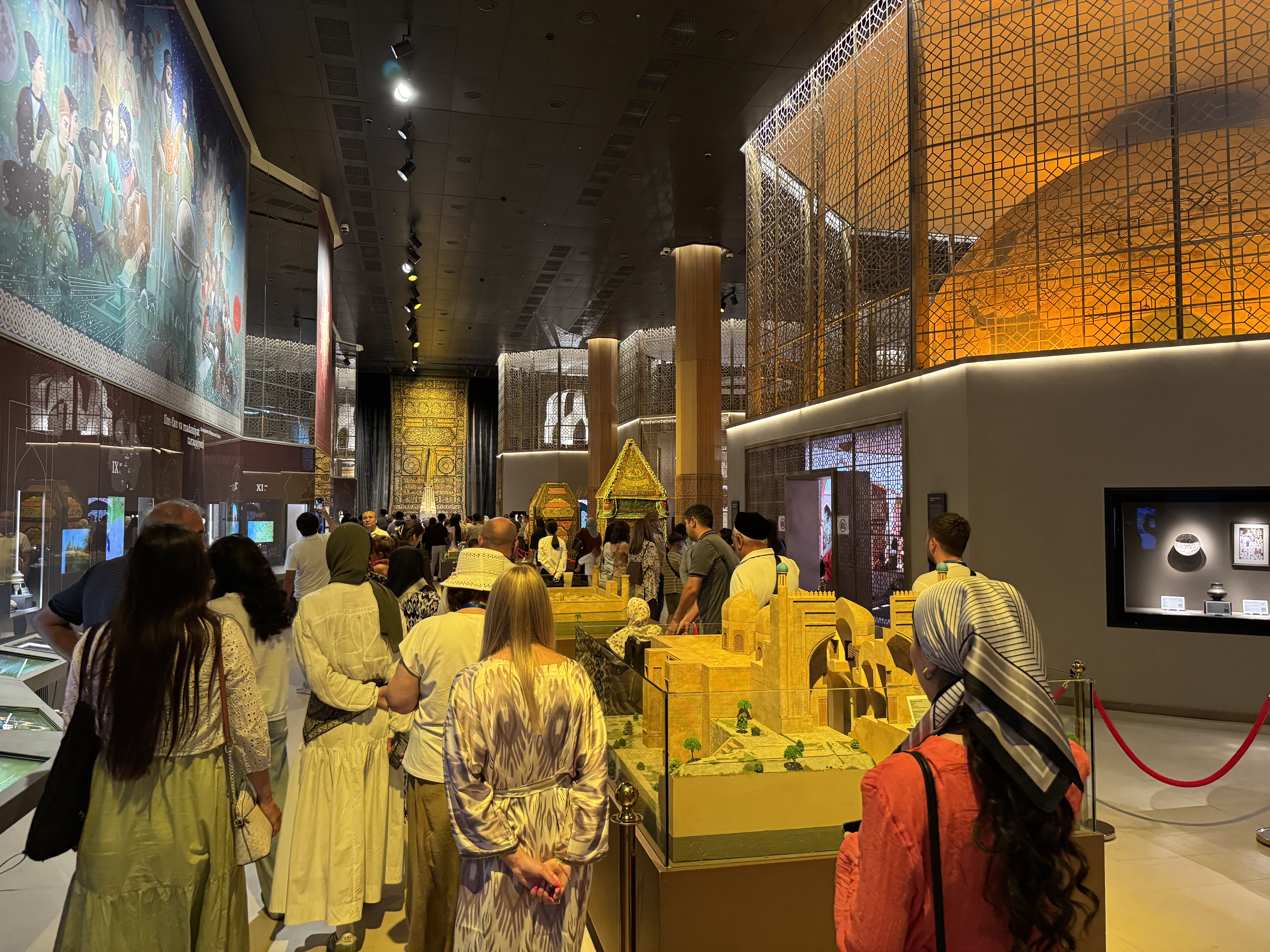
a hall in the museum

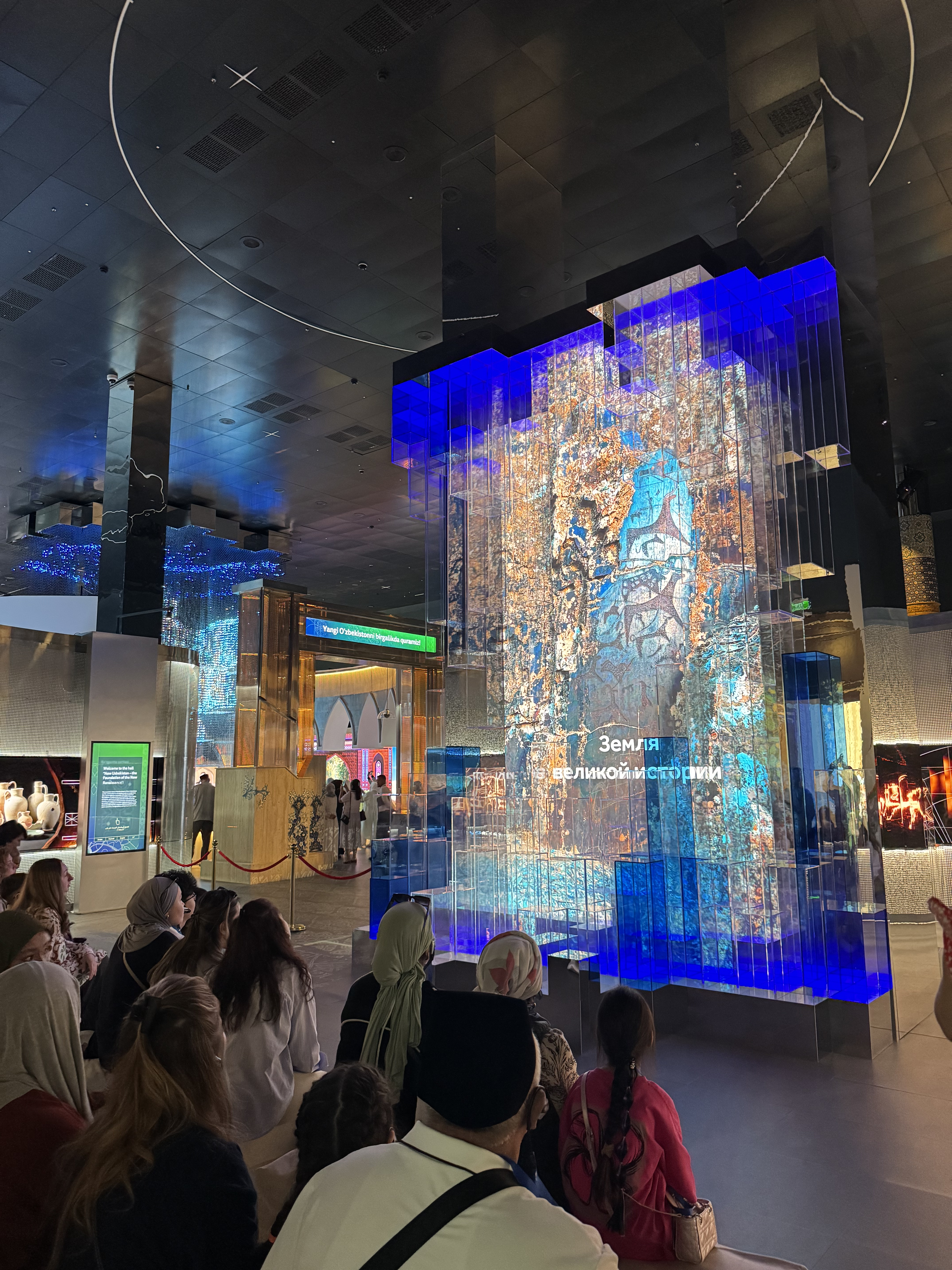
an exhibit presentation in the museum

The museum consists of five halls dedicated to the Samarkand Codex of the Quran of Uthman, pre-Islamic civilization, Islamic Golden Age, Timurid Renaissance and modern history of Uzbekistan. The Quran of Uthman was moved to the museum in November 2025 from the neighboring Hazrati Imam Complex, where it had been kept since March 1989. Scholars involved in the establishment of the museum include Francois Deroche and Irina Popova. An interactive children’s museum at the center will feature “living portraits” of renowned scholars. Another wing will be dedicated to prominent women of the past.

== Administration ==
On July 25, 2017, diplomat Shoazim Minovarov was appointed the first director of the Center for Islamic Civilization. On June 6, 2024, Firdavs Abdukhalikov, Chairman of the World Society for the Study, Preservation and Popularization of the Cultural Heritage of Uzbekistan, was appointed the new director of the Center.

=== International partners ===
- Outdoor Factory (Turkiye)
- Wilmotte & Associés (France)
- Trend Group (Italy)
- Avesta Group

== Projects and exhibitions ==
The Samarkand Kufic Quran, one of the oldest manuscripts of the Islamic world, is exhibited at the spiritual and architectural center of the museum alongside 114 Qur’ans, symbolic of the 114 surahs, dating from different periods. Each of the texts sheds light on the development of calligraphy and the spiritual culture of its time.

The center's first major international media project is a series of films narrated by Ben Kingsley.

== Gallery ==
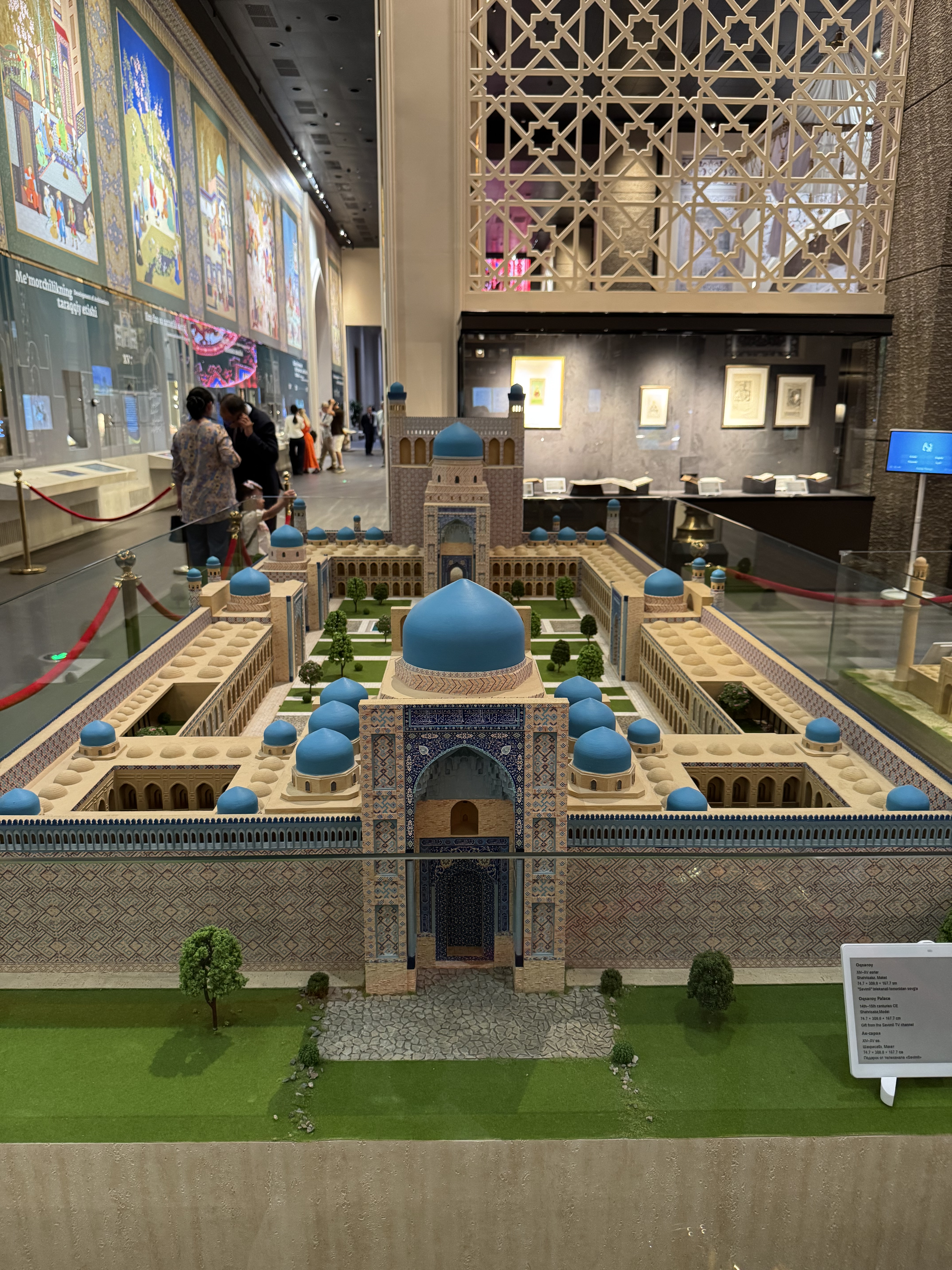
A miniature recreation of the former Ak-Saray Palace

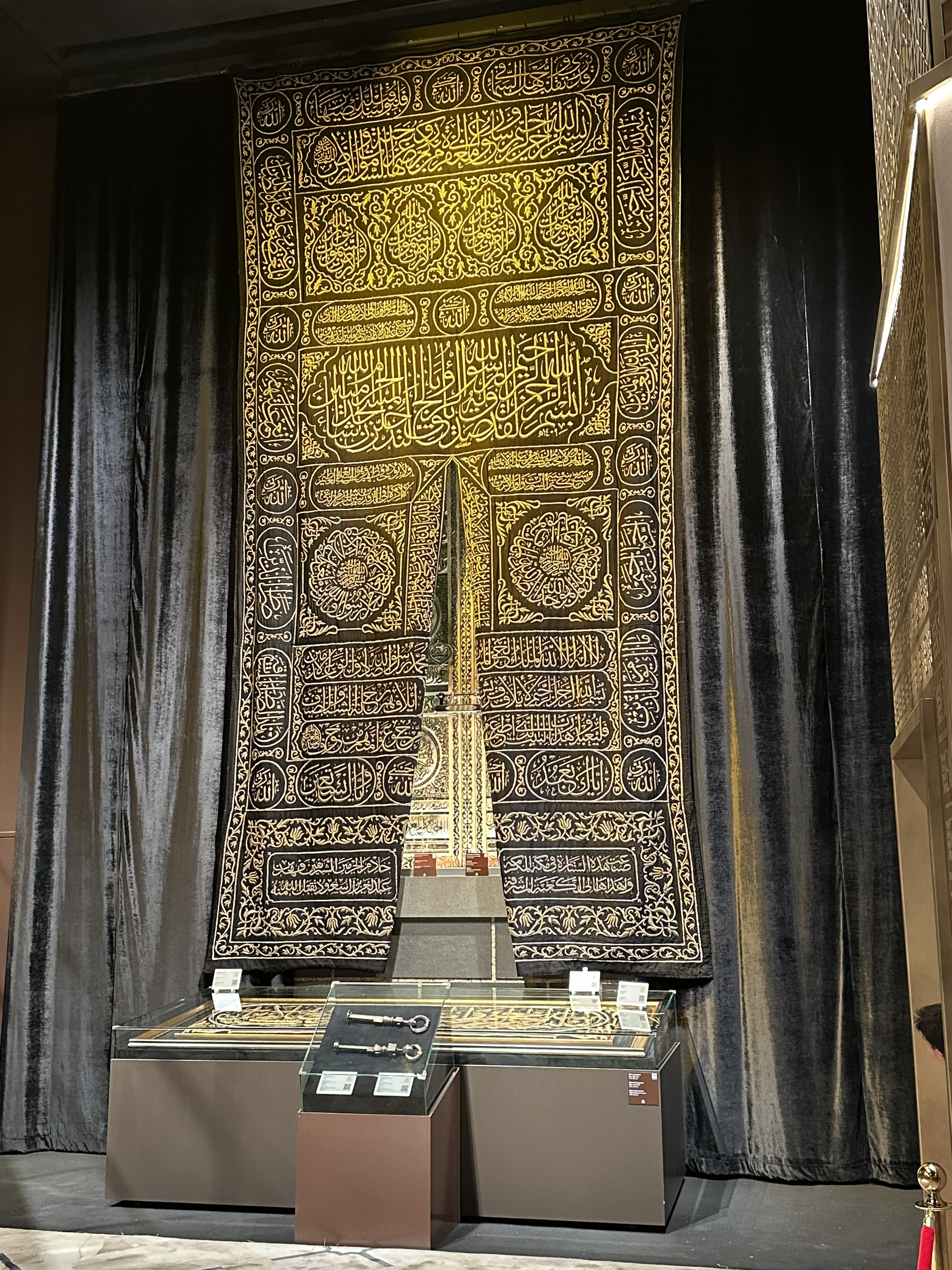
Part of the Kiswa (cover) of the Kaaba

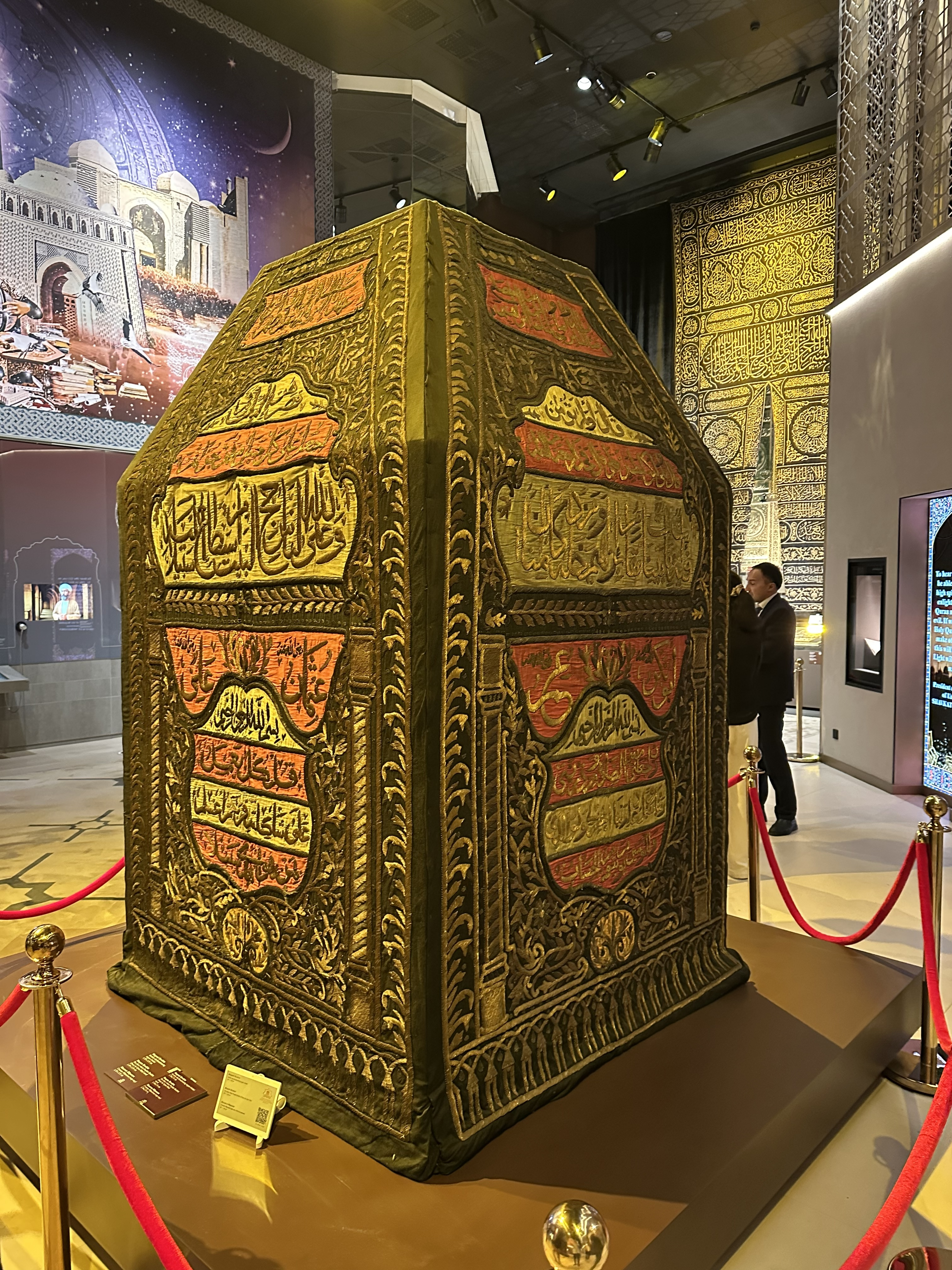
A Mahmal from 1836

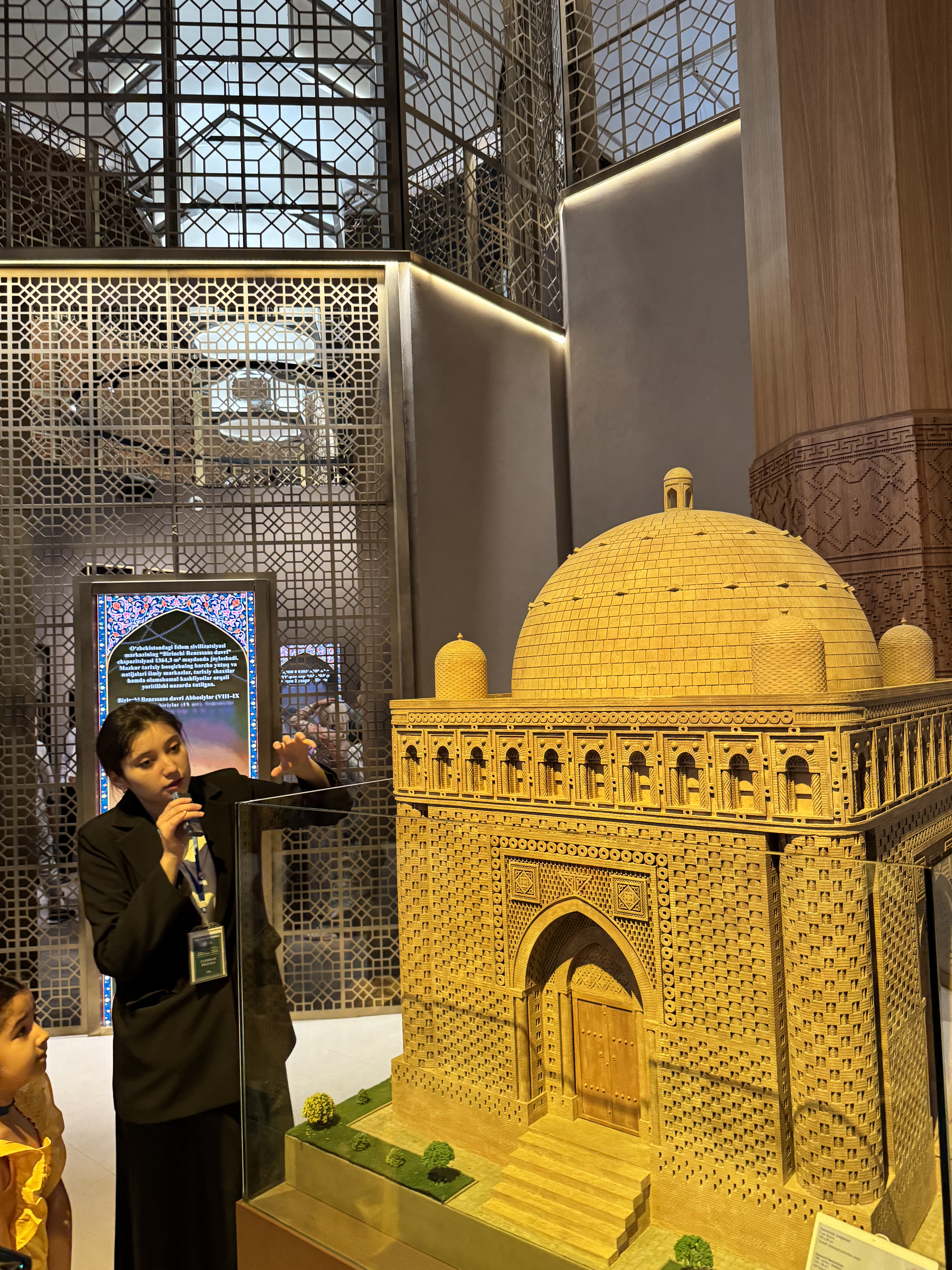
Miniature of the Samanid Mausoleum

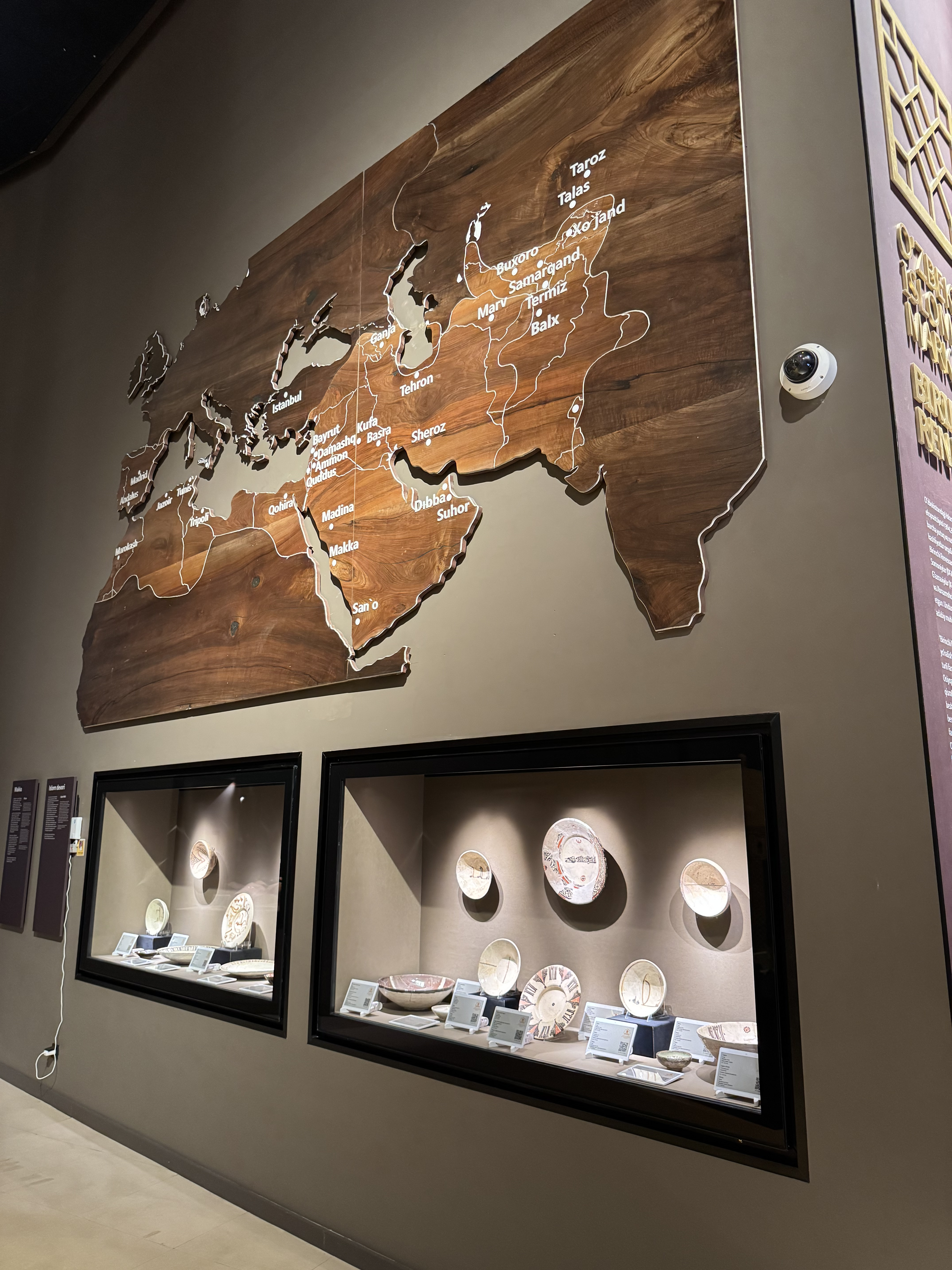
Map of the Umayyad Caliphate

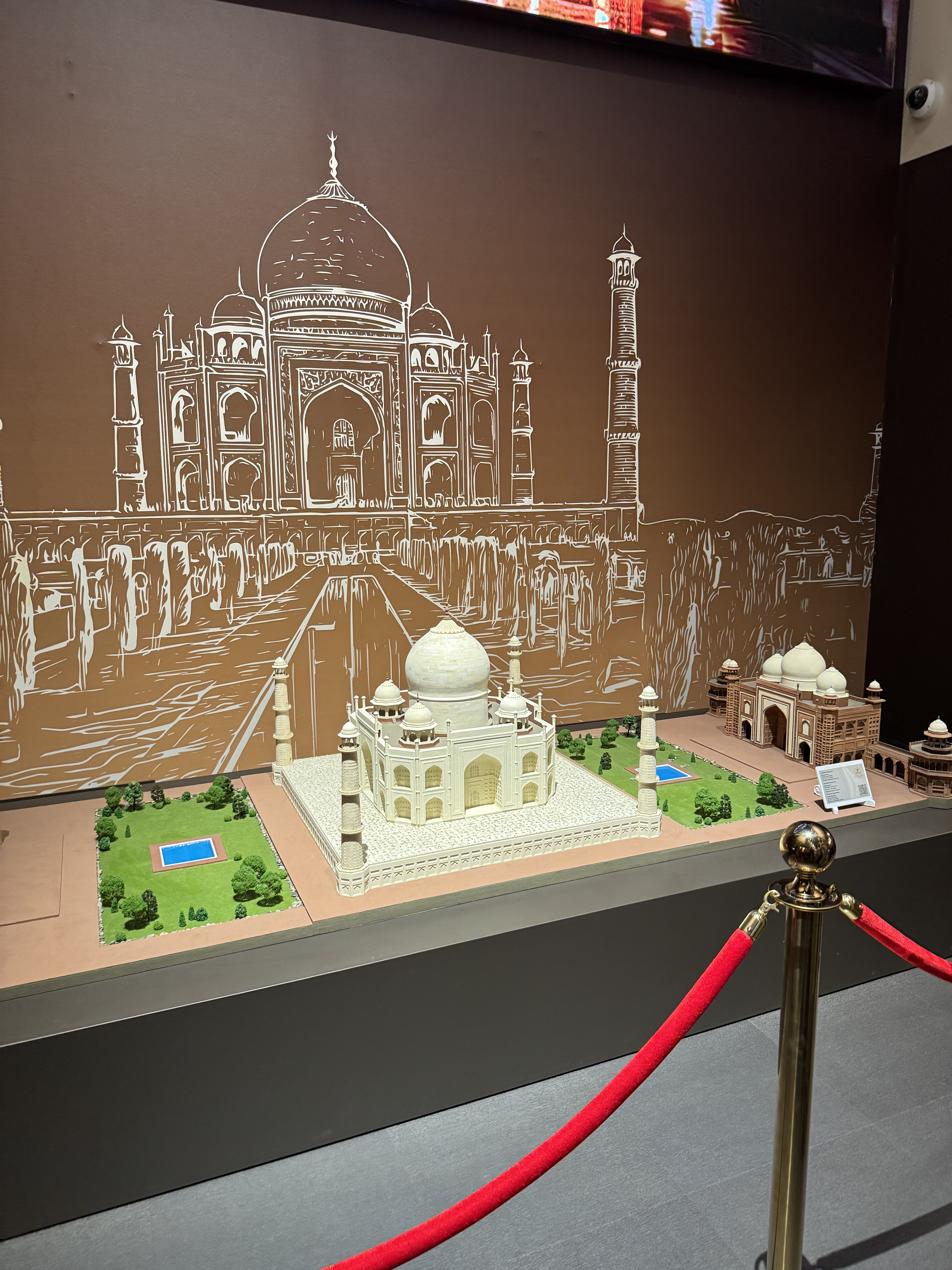
Miniature of the Taj Mahal

== See also ==
- Hazrati Imam Complex
