= Qaffol Shoshi mausoleum =

16th century burial site in Tashkent, Uzbekistan

- Qaffol Shoshiy maqbarasi (Uzbek)
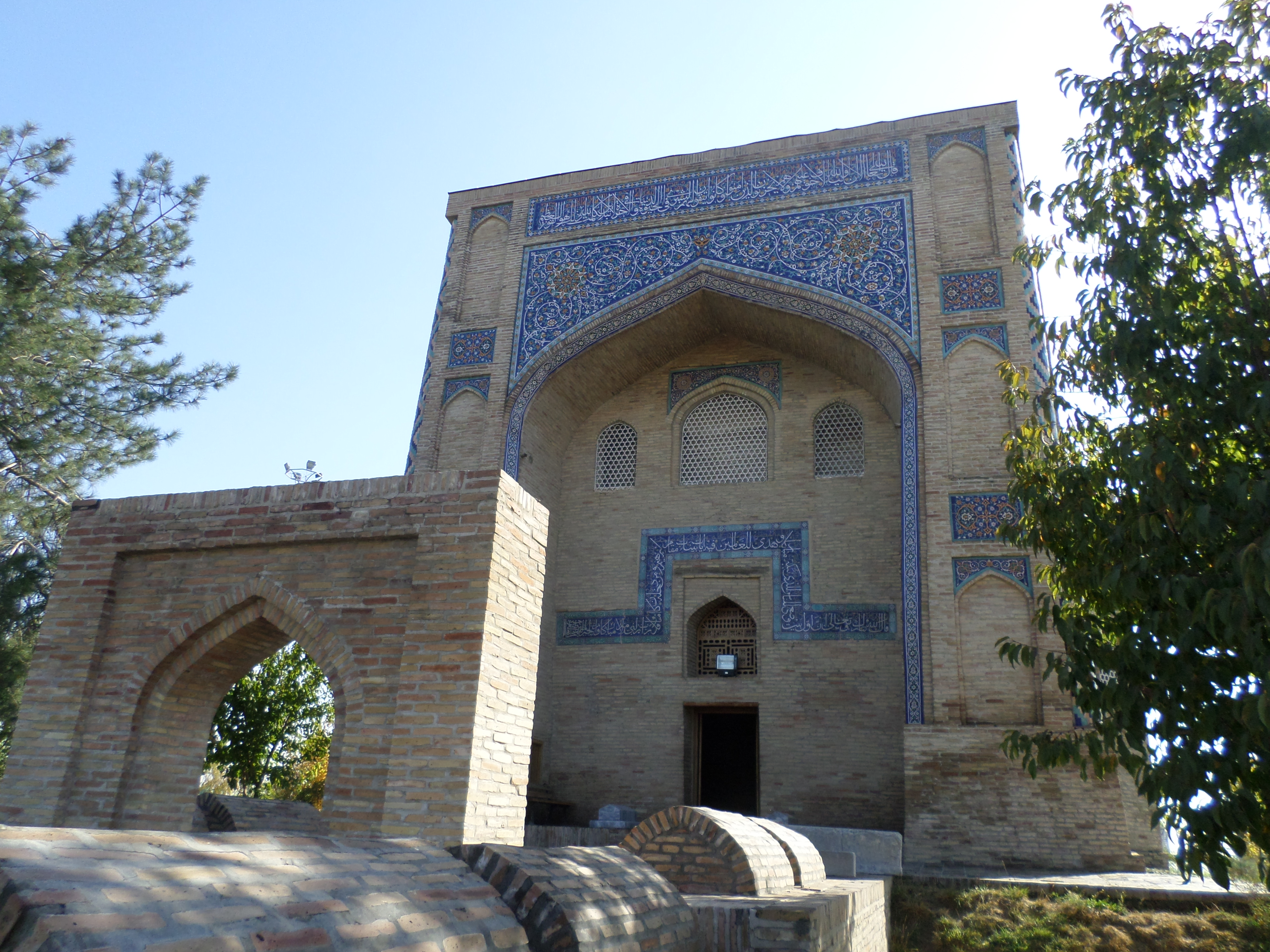
- Mausoleum of Kaffal Shashi
- Interactive map of Qaffol Shoshi mausoleum
- 41°20′18″N 69°14′17″E
- Location: Tashkent, Uzbekistan
- Nearest city: Tashkent

History
- Built: 1542-1542
- Built for: mausoleum

Site notes
- Architect: Ghulam Husayn

Qaffol Shoshi mausoleum (Uzbek: Qaffol Shoshiy maqbarasi) is a mausoleum in Tashkent, Uzbekistan, built in honor of Imam Abu Bakr Muhammad ibn Ali ibn Ismail al-Kaffal ash-Shashi. The original tomb did not survive in its initial form. In its current state, the mausoleum was constructed in 1542 by the royal architect of that time, Gulyam Husayn. It is an asymmetrical domed portal mausoleum, known as a khanqah. Khanqahs were designed to provide pilgrims shelter in residential places called “khujrahs”. Mausoleum complexes often included a mosque and a kitchen. To the south of the main building in a small courtyard, there are later burial places (saganas).

== History ==
The architect Ghulam Husayn built the Qaffol Shoshii mausoleum in 1541-1542 from (25×26×5 cm) baked bricks. During the Soviet period, when authorities were engaged in a campaign against Islam, the Kaffal Shashi Mausoleum was closed. However, believers continued to visit it. On March 27, 1945, the Council of People's Commissars of the Uzbek SSR, by Decree No. 410, transferred the management of the mausoleum, along with six other highly visited pilgrimage sites, to the Spiritual Administration of Muslims of Central Asia and Kazakhstan (SADUM).

== Architecture ==
The mausoleum is square-shaped (13.3×12.5 m) and consists of a large chamber with a corner room featuring an arched entrance. The large chamber (6×6 m) has three sides with a projecting, additional-story dome, topped with a cupola. The main dome and the two towers on its sides are constructed in a traditional style. In the corners of the mausoleum, there are two and three-story eight-angled, and four-cornered “khujrahs”. On the lintel above the door, the construction date of the mausoleum, the architect's name, and the calligrapher's inscription are written; the inscriptions on the dome have not been preserved. The architectural style of the mausoleum is ornamented with carved panels on its walls. The mausoleum's dome is covered with colored tiles, and the burial site is marked with a stone. The burial crypt is adorned with mosaics, and the graves are covered with gravestones. The Hazrati Imam complex later emerged based on the foundation of the Qaffal Shashi Mausoleum

== Gallery ==
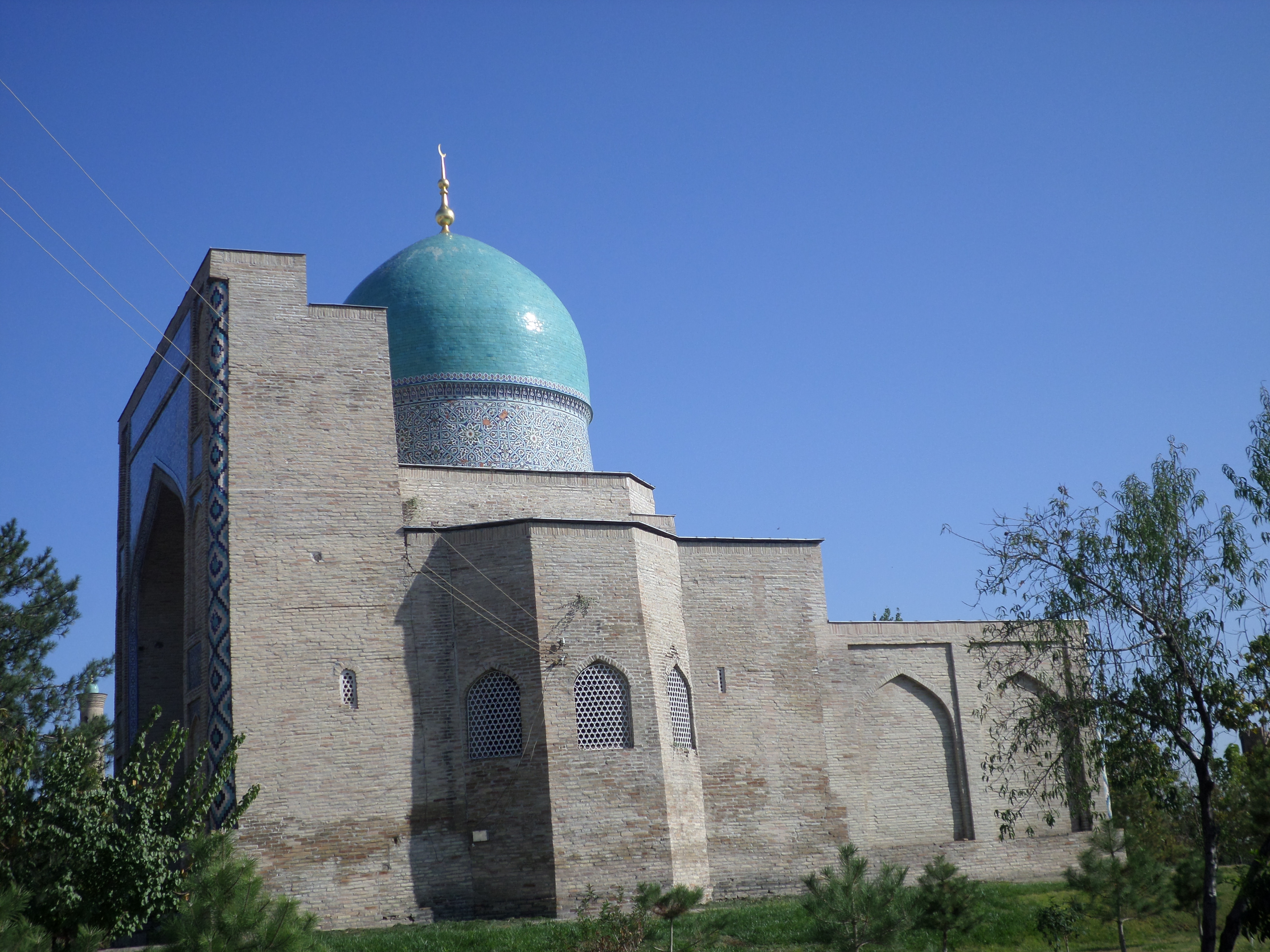
Qaffol Shoshi mausoleum

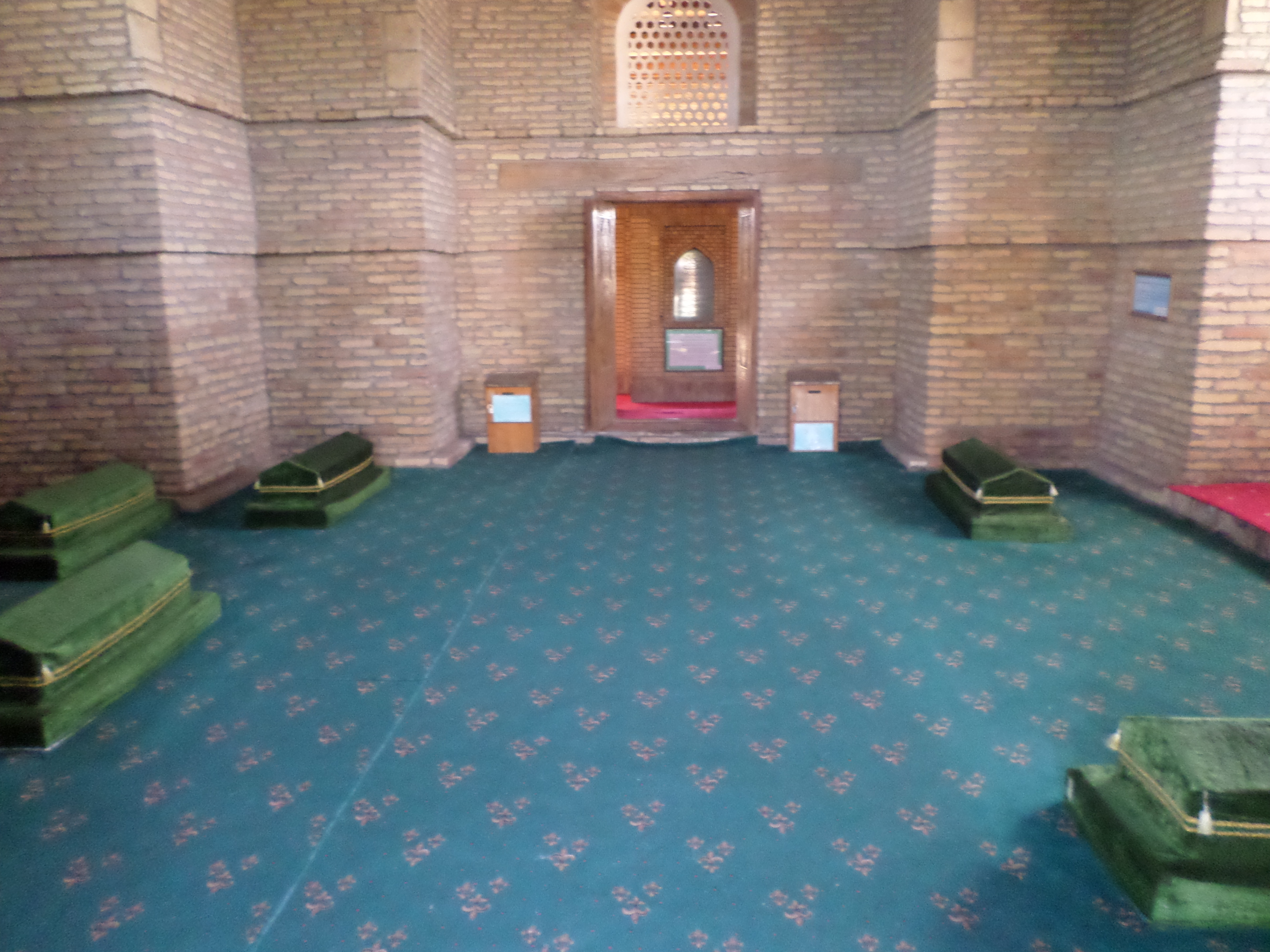
Qaffol Shoshi mausoleum

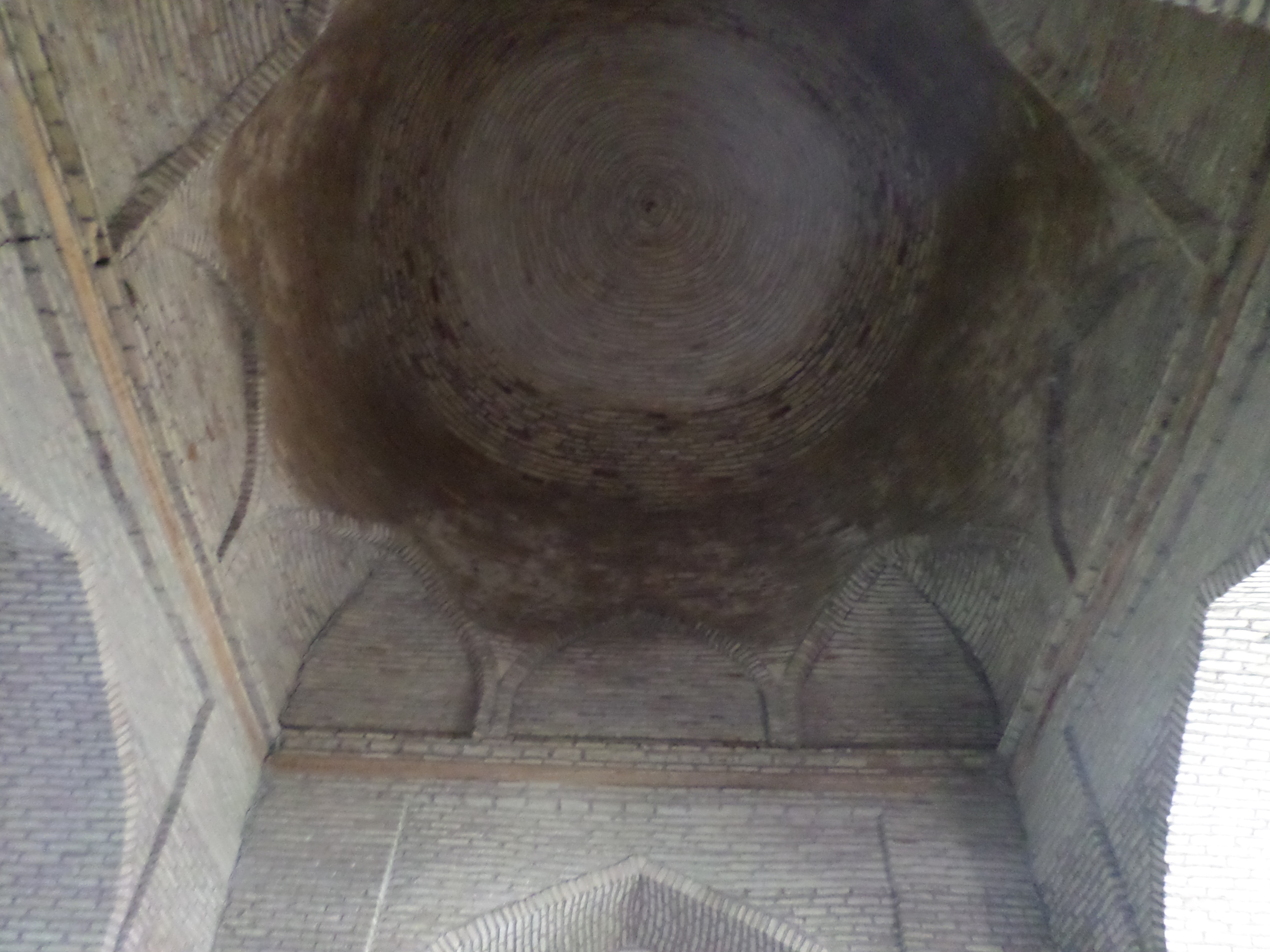
Qaffol Shoshi mausoleum

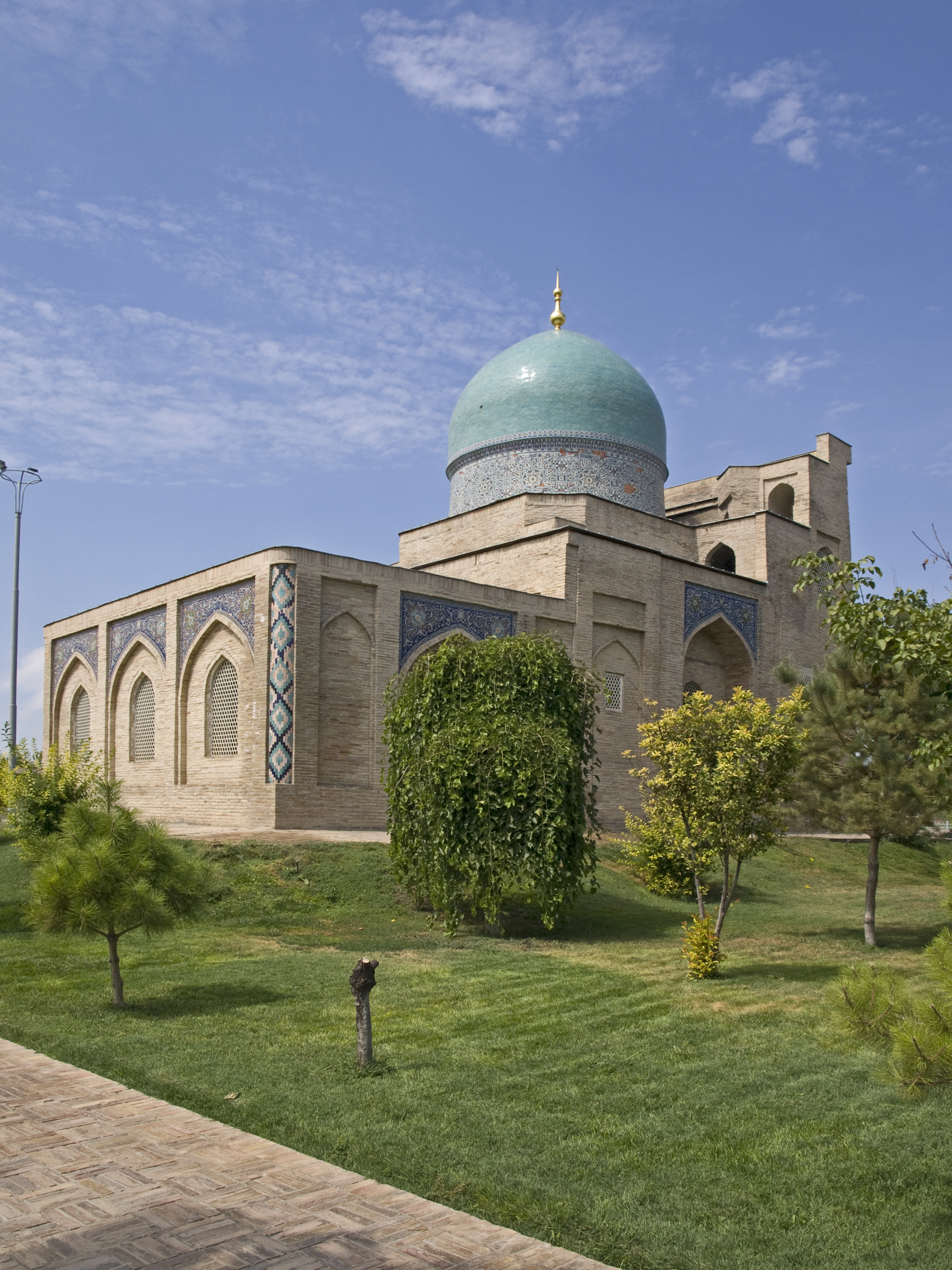
Qaffol Shoshi mausoleum
