= Firdavs Abdukhalikov =

Uzbek public figure

- Firdavs Abduxoliqov
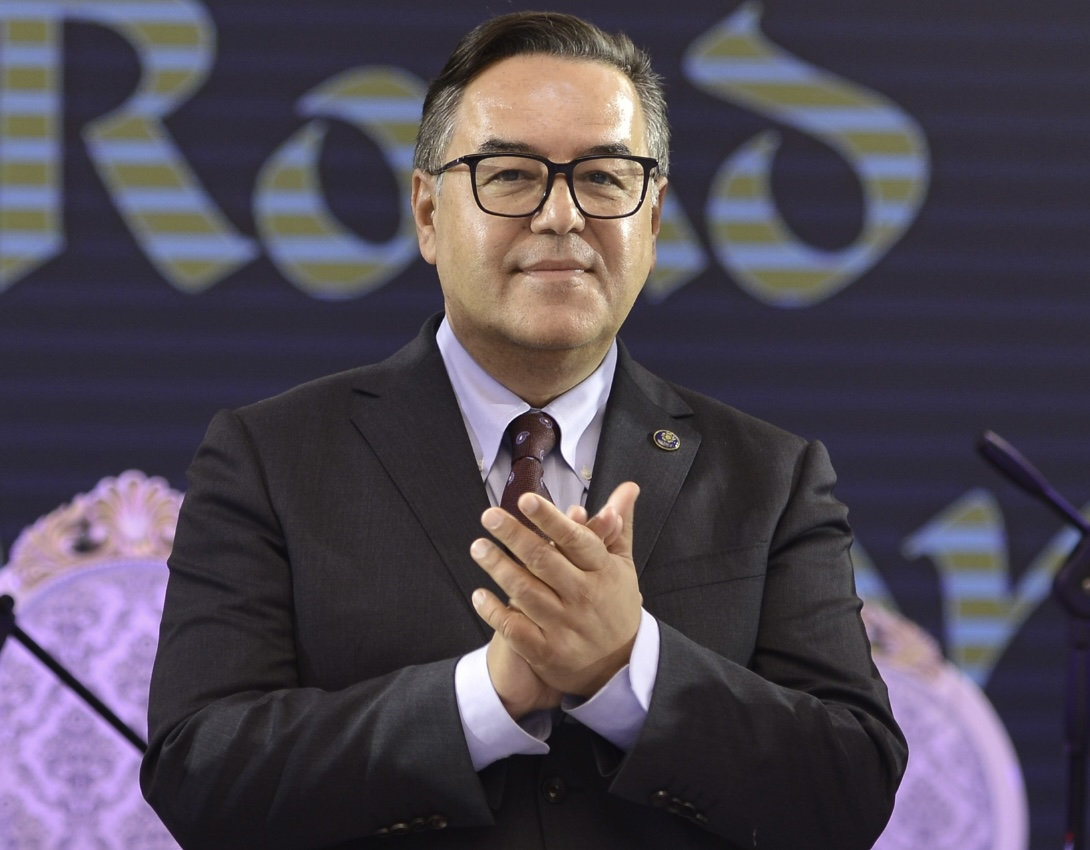
- Born: August 10, 1963 (age 63); Samarkand, Uzbek SSR, USSR (now Uzbekistan)
- Citizenship: Uzbekistan
- Education: Samarkand State University
- Parents: Fridun Abdukhalikov (father); Mokhira Latipova (mother)

Firdavs Abdukhalikov (born August 10, 1963) is an Uzbek scholar and philanthropist, media manager. He is the head of the Center of Islamic Civilization and chairman of the Board of the WOSCU. Author of the biggest series about Uzbek cultural legacy. Abdukhalikov is known for founding Uzbekistan's first non-governmental mass media and broadcasting company.

== Early life and education ==
Abdukhalikov was born on August 10, 1963, in Samarkand, to Fridun Abdukhalikov (1930–2010), medical doctor and professor, and Mokhira Latipova (1938–1998), chairman of labour union. He received a bachelor's degree in philology from Samarkand State University, followed by a master's degree in economics and a PhD in Art History.

== Career ==
He began his career in 1985 as a teacher and was promoted to the director of Samarkand Youth center in 1988. There, he opened the first television studio for production of entertaining shows and a year later in 1989 created his own company, the first in the country non-governmental TV channel STV.

In 1998, by presidential decree he was appointed vice-chairman of National Television and Radio Company of Uzbekistan. He was responsible for creation and launch of Yoshlar, a first TV channel for youth. That year he moved from Samarkand to the capital of the republic, Tashkent.

A year later, in 1999, Abdukhalikov became a chief consultant of the Press Service of the President of Uzbekistan, where he worked on media policy development and public communications until 2002. At the same time, he was elected as member of the Parliament of Uzbekistan and chaired the Committee on Youth Affairs, focusing on legislative initiatives for youth development and media freedoms. His term in parliament finished in 2004.

In 2003, Abdukhalikov founded the National Association of Electronic Mass Media of Uzbekistan (NAEMM), an organization that unified non-governmental media resources and supported independent journalism and television broadcasting. He chaired NAEMM until 2021.

In 2018, he was elected Chairman of the World Society for the Study, Preservation and Popularization of the Cultural Heritage of Uzbekistan (WOSCU). WOSCU’s international initiatives are organizing the annual International Congress of Cultural Heritage, publishing of volumes and scientific researches in multiple languages, establishing partnerships with museums, libraries, and research institutions worldwide.

From 2019 to 2024, Abdukhalikov was the General Director of the Uzbekistan Cinematography Agency.

Since 2024, Abdukhalikov is the head of the Center for Islamic Civilization, cultural and academic institution initiated by President Shavkat Mirziyoyev.

== Awards and recognition ==
- Order of Labour Glory of Uzbekistan for contributions to media development
- Title of Honored Journalist of Uzbekistan
- International Avicenna Prize for contributions to scientific research
