= Early Quranic manuscripts =

Documentary texts in Islamic studies

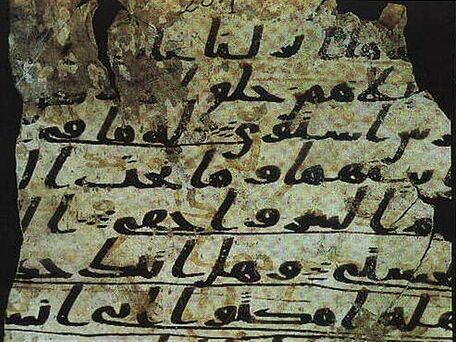
A fragment showing part of Surat Ta-Ha, from the Sanaa manuscript. Possibly the oldest, best preserved and most comprehensive (12,000 parchment fragments) Islamic archaeological document to date.

In Muslim tradition the Quran is the final revelation from God, Islam's divine text, believed to be delivered to the Islamic prophet Muhammad through the angel Jibril (Gabriel). Muhammad's revelations were said to have been recorded orally and in writing, through Muhammad and his followers up until his death in 632 CE. These revelations were then compiled by first caliph Abu Bakr and codified during the reign of the third caliph Uthman (r. 644–656 CE) so that the standard codex edition of the Quran or Muṣḥaf was completed around 650 CE, according to Muslim scholars.

Until the early 1970s, non-Muslim Islamic scholars generally accepted the traditional narrative—excluding the divine source—in its entirety. These explanations did not satisfy a new generation of researchers; some Western scholars question the accuracy of the traditional accounts on whether the holy book existed in any form before the last decade of the seventh century (Patricia Crone and Michael Cook); and/or argue it is a "cocktail of texts", some of which may have been existent a hundred years before Muhammad, that evolved (Gerd R. Puin), or was redacted (J. Wansbrough), to form the Quran. After the creation of this standardized "canonical" text, the earlier texts were suppressed, and all existing manuscripts—despite their numerous variants—appear to date from a time after the creation of this text. According to some researchers like John Wansbrough and Yehuda D. Nevo, later tagged as the critical historians of Islam, the canonization of the Quran, through the unification of "various previous texts" into a single, unchanging standard text and the elimination of others, took place over a period of approximately 200 years. (Note: Ibn Babawayh was the first major Twelver author "to adopt a position identical to that of the Sunnis" and the change was a result of the "rise to power of the Sunni 'Abbasid caliphate," whence belief in the corruption of the Quran became untenable vis-a-vis the position of Sunni "orthodoxy".) They argued that a common method within Islamic tradition was to legitimize a practice by attributing it to a past authority that enjoyed high popular acceptance. Although most of the different versions/readings of the Quranic text are no longer transmitted, some still are.

According to Corpus Coranicum, more than 60 fragments including more than 2000 folios (4000 pages) are so far known as the textual witnesses (manuscripts) of the Qur'an before 800 CE (within 168 years after the death of Muhammad). Quranic studies is the academic study of the Quran. The field uses and applies a diverse set of disciplines and methods, such as philology, textual criticism, lexicography, codicology, literary criticism, comparative religion, and historical criticism. Studies on the Quran rarely went beyond textual criticism and have not produced a critical text that could form the basis for a scientific reconstruction of the Quranic text. (Note: For both the claim that variant readings are still transmitted and the claim that no such critical edition has been produced, see Gilliot, C., "Creation of a fixed text")

== Hijazi manuscripts ==
Hijazi manuscripts are some of the earliest forms of Quranic texts, and can be characterized by Hijazi script. Hijazi script is distinguished by its "informal, sloping Arabic script." The most widely used Qurans were written in the Hijazi style script, a style that originates before Kufic style script. This is portrayed by the rightward inclining of the tall shafts of the letters, and the vertical extension of the letters.

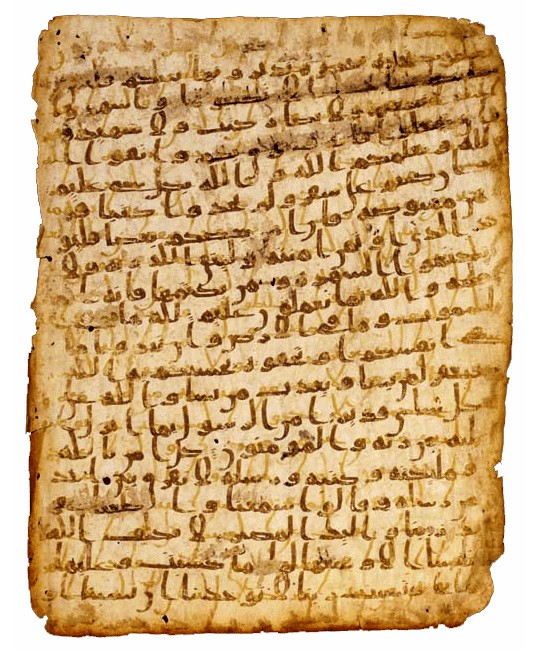
Sura al-Baqarah, verses 282–286, from an early Quranic manuscript written on vellum (mid-late 7th century CE)

=== Berlin State Library Ms. or. fol. 4313 / Dār al-Kutub library Qāf 47 ===
Ms. or. fol. 4313, formerly known as Qāf 47, is a Qurʾānic manuscript held across two collections: 31 parchment folios at the Dār al-Kutub library (Ms. 247 Maṣāḥif) in Egypt, and seven parchment leaves at the Berlin State Library — 38 folios in total, covering approximately 16 percent of the Qurʾānic text. The Egyptian fragments have undergone recent restoration.

Bernhard Moritz initially dated the manuscript to the third/ninth century; Adolf Grohmann and Sergio Noseda later revised this to the first/seventh century. Recent radiocarbon dating of two samples by Corpus Coranicum places it between 15–30 AH/606–652 CE with a 95.4 percent probability.

François Déroche classified the script subtype as 'Ḥijāzī II', though Marx and Jocham do not accept this designation, noting that it remains paleographically difficult to classify. The qirāʾāt of the manuscript shows general alignment with Ibn ʿĀmir (d. 118 AH/736 CE), with notable exceptions in certain places.

=== Sana'a manuscript ===
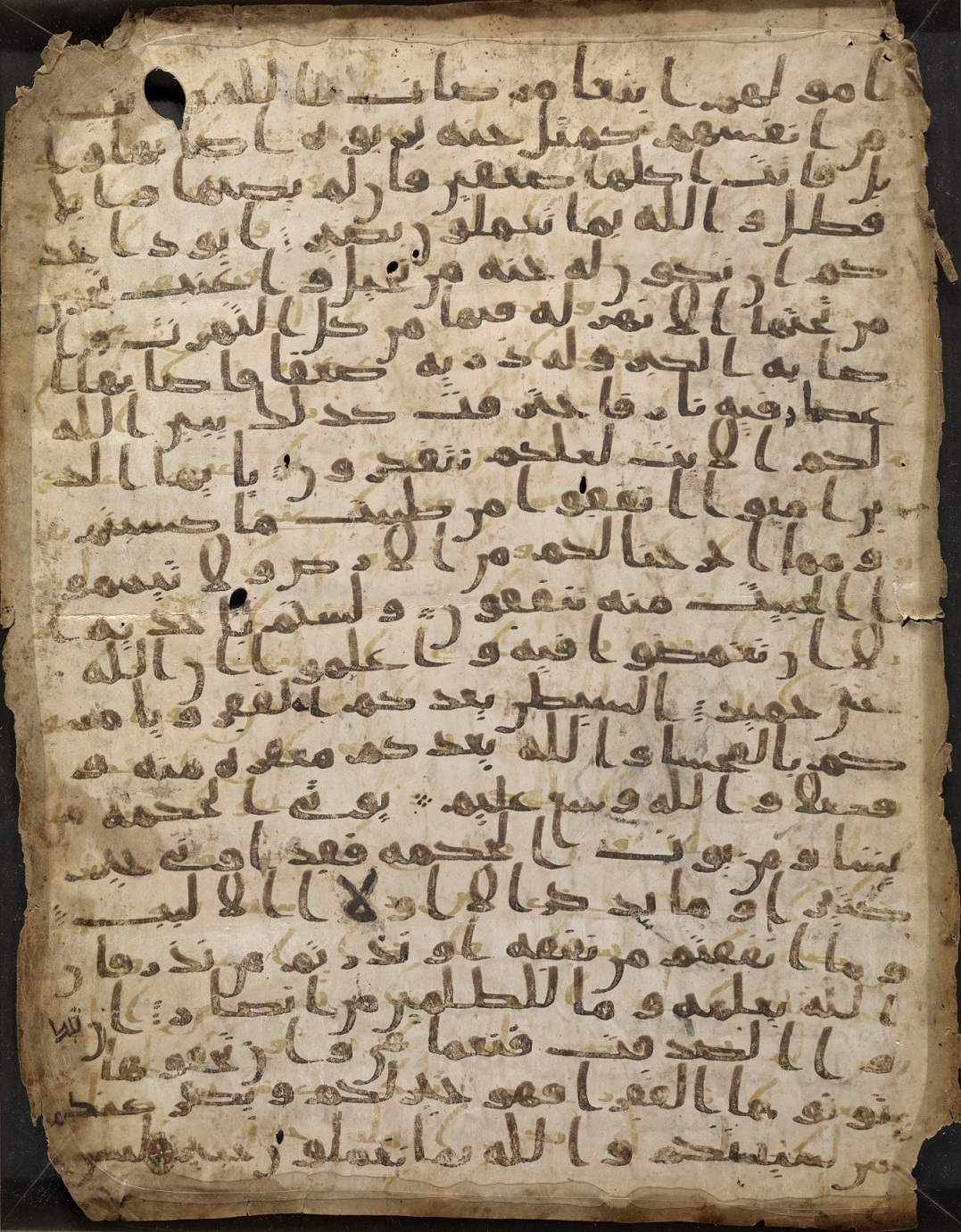
Recto side of the Stanford '07 folio. The upper text covers Surah 2 (al-Baqarah), verses 265–271.

The Sana'a manuscript is one of the oldest Quranic manuscripts in existence. It was found, along with many other Quranic and non-Quranic fragments, in Yemen in 1972 during restoration of the Great Mosque of Sana'a.

The find includes 12,000 Quranic parchment fragments. All of them, except 1500–2000 fragments, were assigned to 926 distinct Quranic manuscripts as of 1997. None is complete and many contain only a few folios apiece.

The manuscript is written on parchment, and comprises two layers of text (see palimpsest). The upper text conforms to the standard 'Uthmanic Quran, whereas the lower text contains variants to the standard text. An edition of the lower text was published in 2012. A radiocarbon analysis has dated the parchment containing the lower text to before 671 AD with 99% probability.

=== Tübingen fragment ===
In November 2014, the University of Tübingen in Germany announced that a partial Quran manuscript in their possession (Ms M a VI 165), had been carbon dated (95.4% credible interval), to between 649 and 675. The manuscript is now recognised as being written in hijazi script, although in the 1930 catalogue of the collection it is classified as "Kufic", and consists of the Quranic verses 17:36, to 36:57 (and part of verse 17:35).

=== Codex Parisino-petropolitanus ===
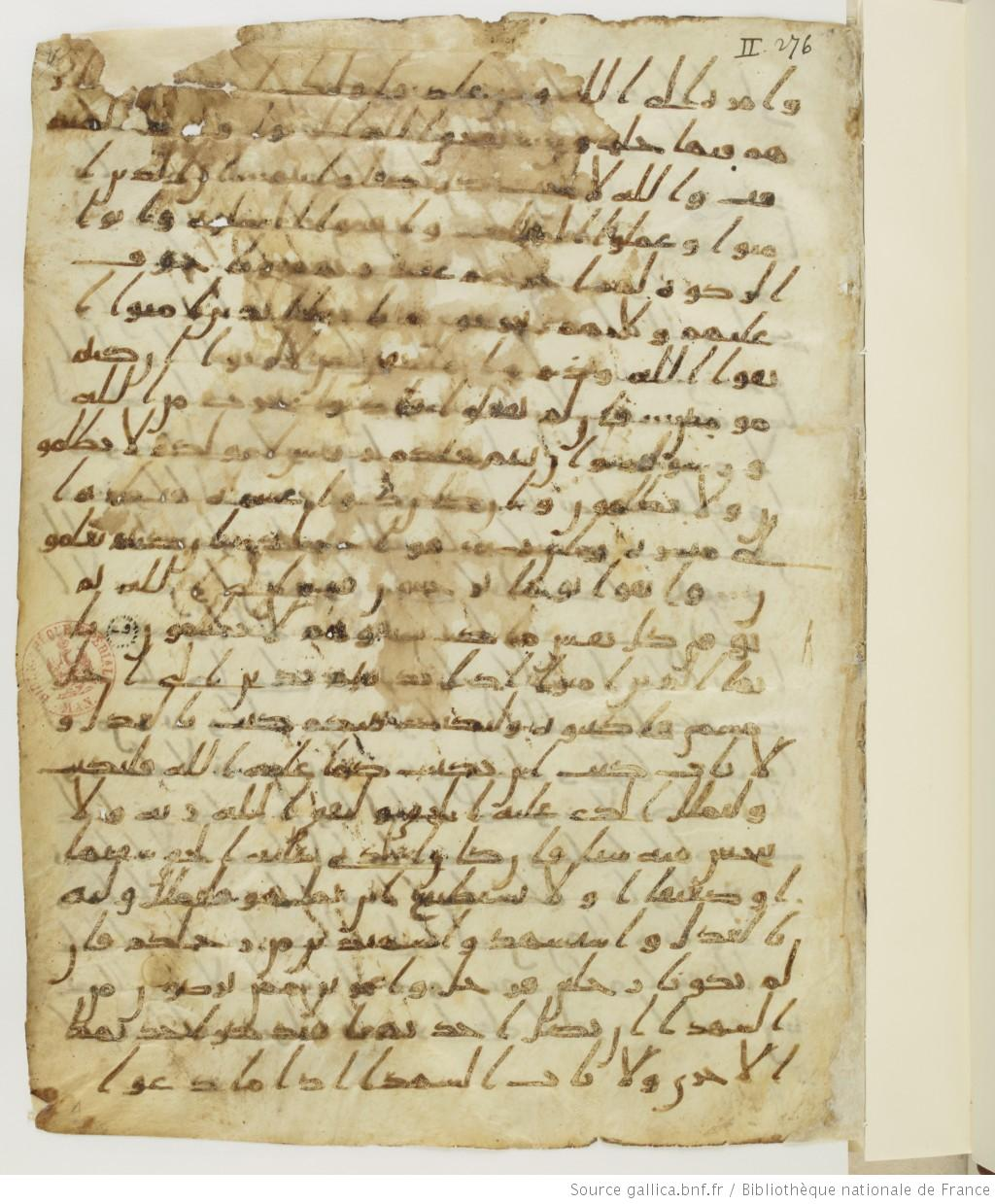
The recto of the first folio of codex Parisino-petropolitanus.

The Codex Parisino-petropolitanus formerly conserved portions of two of the oldest extant Quranic manuscripts. One of these is preserved in various fragments, the largest part of which are kept in the Bibliothèque nationale de France, as BNF Arabe 328(ab). Forty-six folios are held at the National Library of Russia and one each in the Vatican Library (Vat. Ar. 1605/1) and in the Khalili Collection of Islamic Art (KFQ 60).

==== BnF Arabe 328(c) ====
BnF Arabe 328(c), formerly bound with BnF Arabe 328(ab), has 16 leaves, with two additional leaves discovered in Birmingham in 2015 (Mingana 1572a, bound with an unrelated Quranic manuscript).

BnF Arabe 328(c) was among a group of folios from the store of Quranic manuscripts at the Mosque of Amr ibn al-As in Fustat. These were bought by French Orientalist Jean-Louis Asselin de Cherville (1772–1822) when he served as vice-consul in Cairo during 1806–1816.

The 16 folia in Paris contain the text of chapter 10:35 to 11:95 and of 20:99 to 23:11. The Birmingham folia covers part of the lacuna (gap) in the Paris portion, with parts of the text of suras 18, 19 and 20.

===== Birmingham Quran manuscript =====
The Birmingham Quran manuscript parchment of two leaves (cataloged as Mingana 1572a) has been radiocarbon dated to between 568 and 645 CE (95.4% credible interval), indicating the animal from which the parchment was made lived during that time.

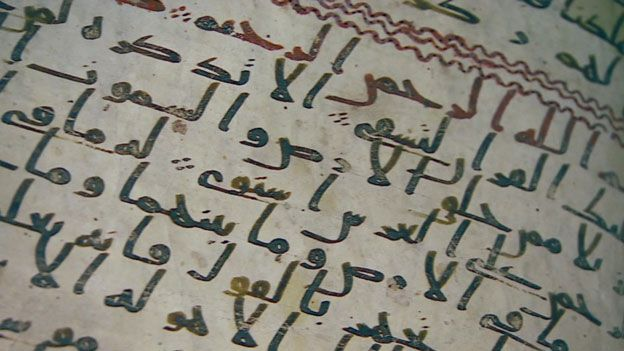
Close up of part of folio 2 recto of Birmingham Quran manuscript

The parts of Surahs 18-20 its leaves preserve are written in ink on parchment, using an Arabic Hijazi script and are still clearly legible. The leaves are folio size (343 mm by 258 mm; 13½" x 10¼" at the widest point), and are written on both sides in a generously scaled and legible script. The text is laid out in the format that was to become standard for complete Quran texts, with chapter divisions indicated by linear decoration, and verse endings by intertextual clustered dots.

The two leaves are held by the University of Birmingham, in the Cadbury Research Library, but have been recognized as corresponding to a lacuna in the 16 leaves catalogued as BnF Arabe 328(c) in the Bibliothèque Nationale de France in Paris, now bound with the Codex Parisino-petropolitanus.

There are disagreements over the dating of the manuscript's text. According to David Thomas of the University of Birmingham, it could be said with some confidence the text was written before 652 CE while Marijn van Putten, who has published work on the idiosyncratic orthography common to early manuscripts of the Uthmanic text type, has argued with reference to a number of these same idiosyncratic spellings present in the Birmingham fragment (Mingana 1572a + Arabe 328c) that it is "clearly a descendant of the Uthmanic text type," and that it is therefore "impossible" that it represents a pre-Uthmanic copy.

=== Cambridge MS Add. 1125 ===
This manuscript was acquired by University of Cambridge from Edward H. Palmer (1840-1882) and EE Tyrwhitt Drake. It was created before 800CE according to Corpus Coranicum. It contains Quran from 8:10-72 written on 4 folios.

=== British Library MS. Or. 2165 ===
British Library MS. Or. 2165 Early Qur'anic manuscript written in Ma'il script, 7th or 8th century CE.

=== Codex Mashhad ===
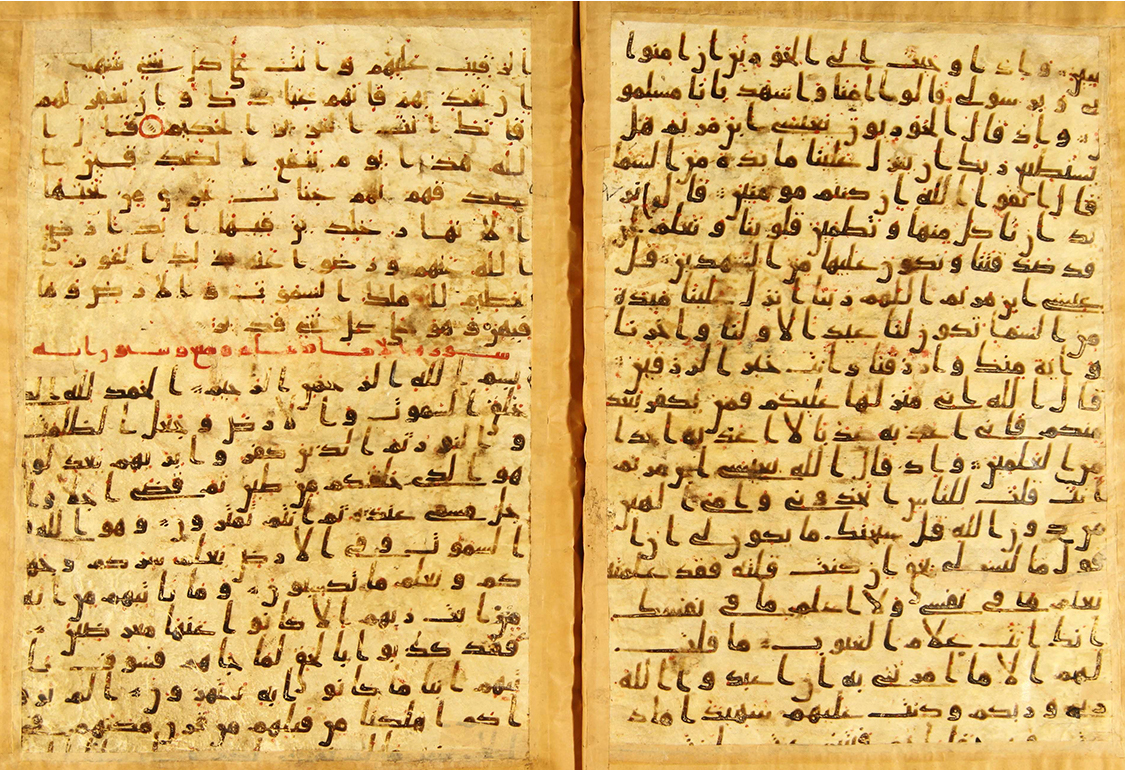
Folios of Codex Mashhad: Transition between sūras when Ibn Masʿūd arrangement of sūras was made to conform with ʿUthmān's arrangement. Folios 50r, 49v - transition from the end of sūra al-Māʾida

The term Codex Mashhad refers to an old codex of the Qurʾān, now mostly preserved in two manuscripts, MSS 18 and 4116, in the Āstān-i Quds Library, Mashhad, Iran. The first manuscript in 122 folios and the second in 129 folios together constitute more than 90% of the text of the Qurʾān, and it is also likely that other fragments will be found in Mashhad or elsewhere in the world. The current Codex is in two separate volumes, MSS 18 and 4116. The former contains the first half of the Qurʾān, from the beginning to the end of the 18th sūra, al-Kahf, while the latter comprises the second half, from the middle of the 20th sūra, Ṭāhā, to the end of the Qurʾān. In their present form, both parts of Codex Mashhad have been repaired, partially completed with pieces from later Kufic Qurʾāns and sometimes in a present-day nashkī hand.

Codex Mashhad has almost all the elements and features of the oldest known Qurʾānic codices. The dual volumes of the main body, written in ḥijāzī or māʾil script, are the only ḥijāzī manuscripts in vertical format in Iran. Like all ancient ḥijāzī codices, Codex Mashhad contains variant readings, regional differences of Qurʾānic codices, orthographic peculiarities, and copyists’ errors, partly corrected by later hands. The script and orthography of the Codex show instances of archaic and not-yet-completely-recognized rules, manifested in various spelling peculiarities. Illumination and ornamentation are not found even in sūra-headbands; rather, some crude sūra dividers have been added later and are found only on adjoining sections.

The script in this manuscript is similar to Codex M a VI 165 at Tübingen (Germany), Codex Arabe 331 at the Bibliothèque Nationale (Paris), and Kodex Wetzstein II 1913 at Staatsbibliothek (Berlin). The combined radiocarbon dating of these manuscripts points firmly to the 1st century of hijra.

== Kufic manuscripts ==
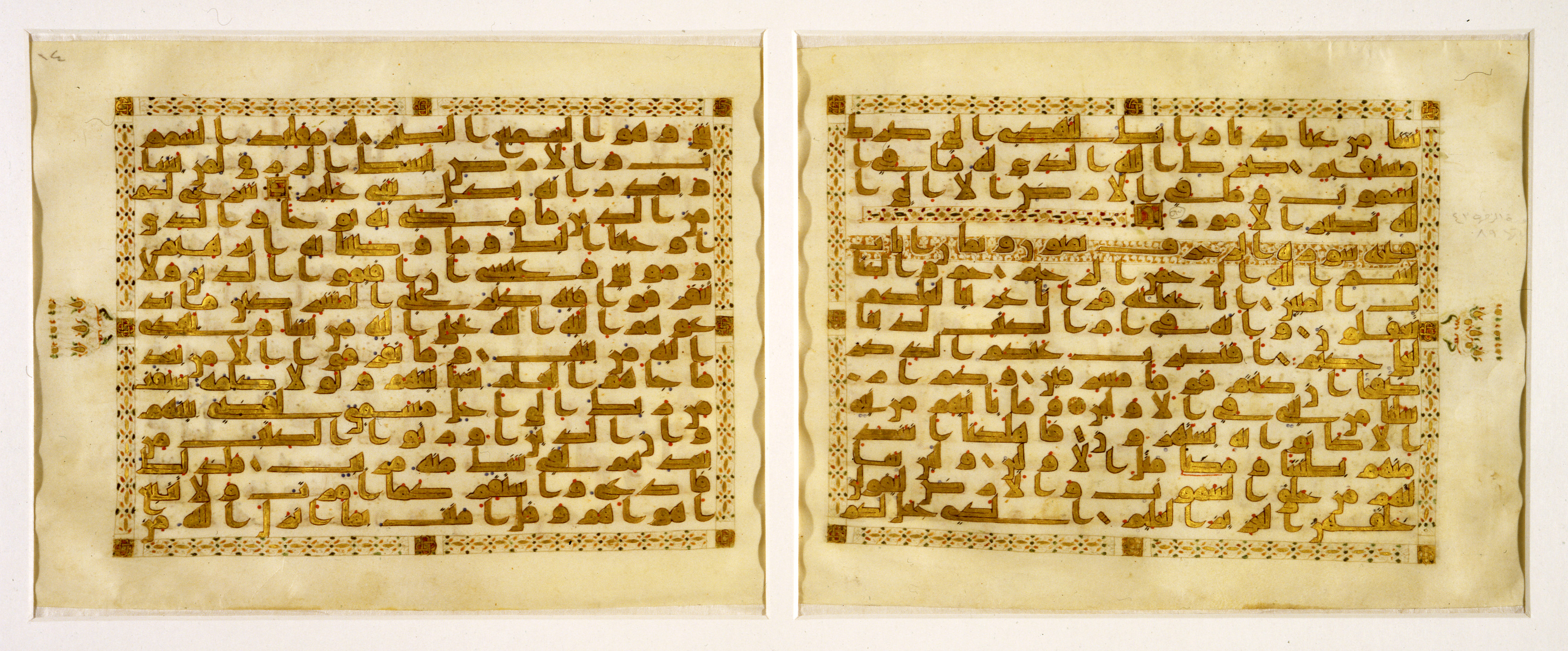
Quran in Kufic script

Kufic manuscripts can be characterized by the Kufic form of calligraphy. Kufic calligraphy, which was later named after art historians in the 19th or 20th century is described by means of precise upstanding letters. For a long time, the Blue Qur'an, the Topkapi manuscript, and the Samarkand Kufic Quran were considered the oldest Quran copies in existence. Both codices are more or less complete. They are written in the Kufic script. It "can generally be dated from the late eighth century depending on the extent of development in the character of the script in each case."

=== The Blue Quran ===
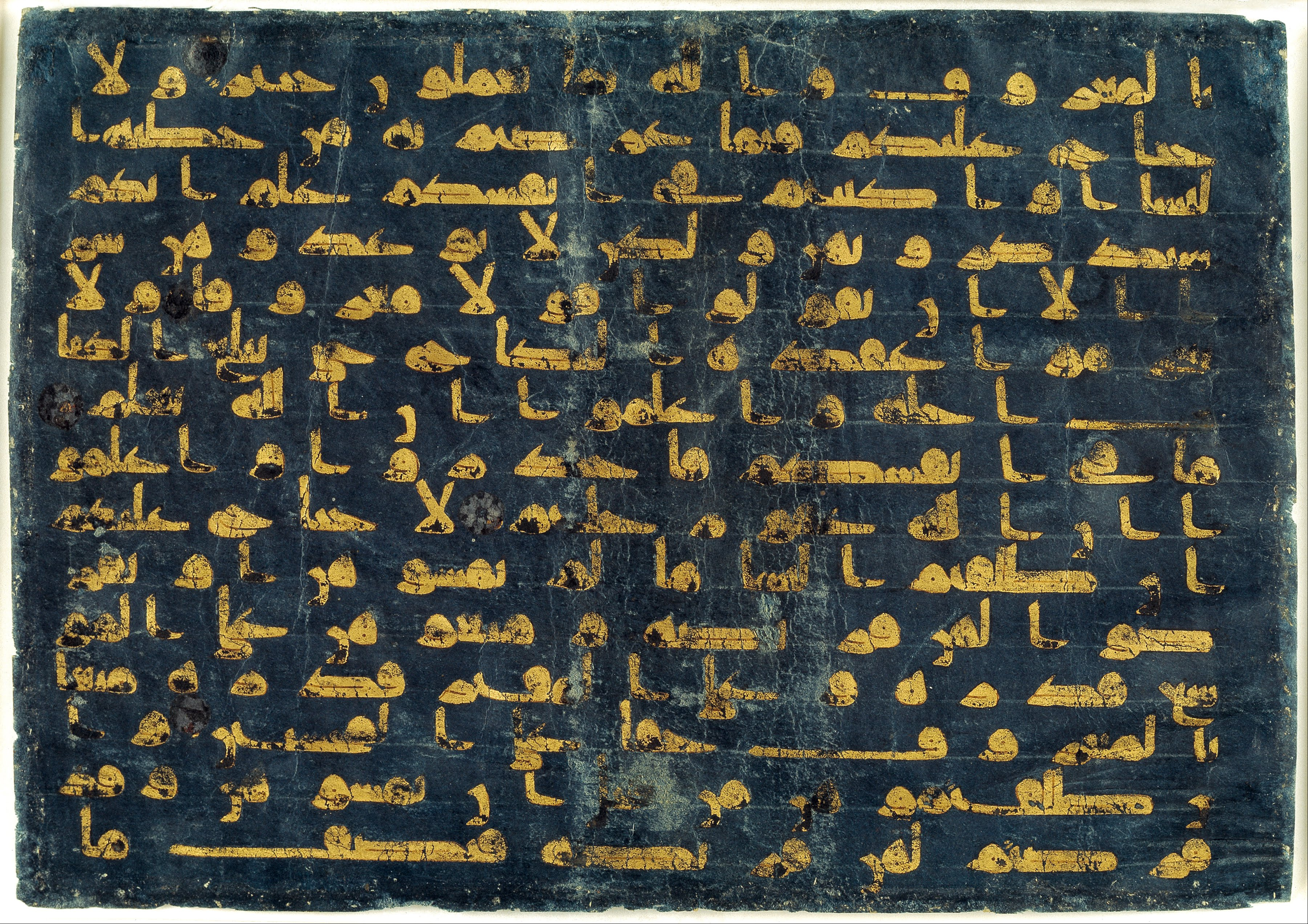
The Blue Quran

The Blue Qur'an (Arabic: المصحف الأزرق al-Muṣḥaf al-′Azraq) is a late 9th to early 10th-century Tunisian Qur'an manuscript in Kufic calligraphy, probably created in North Africa for the Great Mosque of Kairouan. It is among the most famous works of Islamic calligraphy, and has been called "one of the most extraordinary luxury manuscripts ever created." Because the manuscript was done in Kufic style writing, it is quite hard to read. "The letters have been manipulated to make each line the same length, and the marks necessary to distinguish between letters have been omitted." The Blue Quran is constructed of indigo-dyed parchment with the inscriptions done in gold ink, which makes it one of the rarest Quran productions ever known. The use of dyed parchment and gold ink is said to have been inspired by the Christian Byzantine Empire, due to the fact that many manuscripts were produced in the same way there. Each verse is separated by circular silver marks, although they are now harder to see due to fading and oxidization.

=== Topkapı manuscript ===
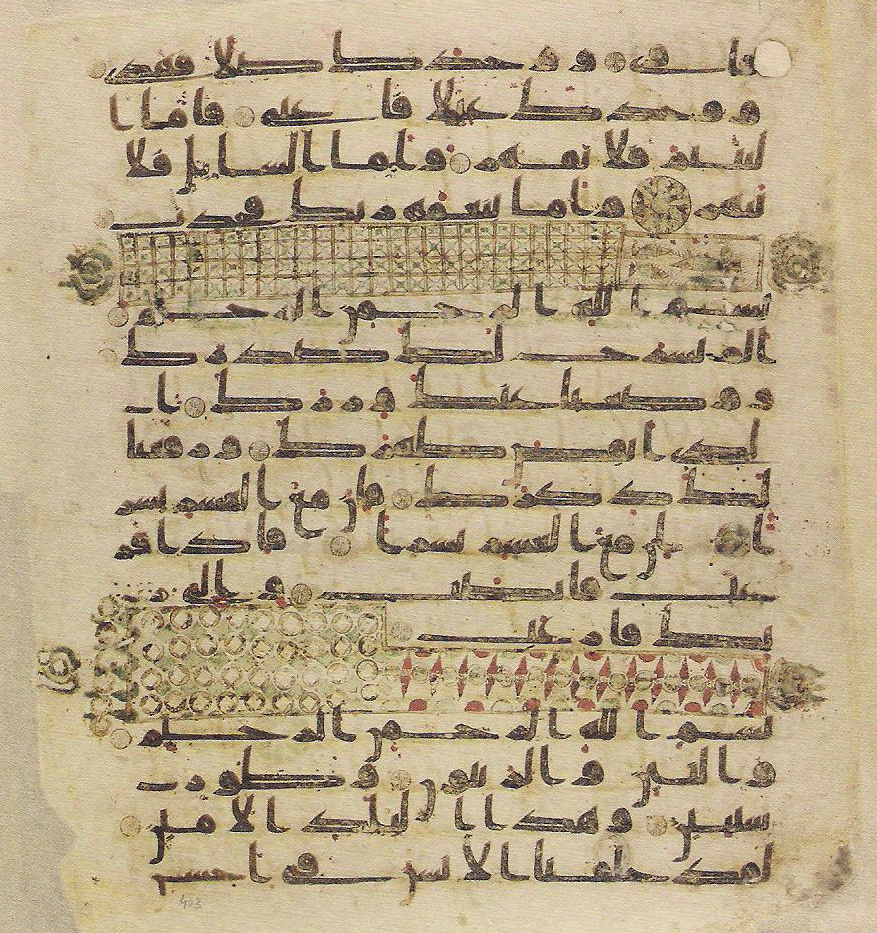
The Topkapı manuscript

The Topkapı Qurʾān manuscript is notable for its size, script, and historical context. Originating from late 7th Century to mid-8th century, this manuscript is preserved in the Topkapi Palace Museum in Istanbul (inventory number H.S. 32). It showcases a unique style of Kufic script and is distinguished by its ornate decorations and intricate calligraphy. The manuscript has been the subject of scholarly study for its textual variants, providing insights into the early transmission and preservation of the Qurʾānic text. Originally it was attributed to Caliph Uthman Ibn Affan (d. 656). However, a 2024 analysis of the manuscript's paleography and orthography by Rami Husain Halaseh has denied this attribution.

=== Codex Mixt. 917 ===
This early Kufic Quranic manuscript is located in Austrian National Library. Originally from Anatolia, it came into the possession of the Austrian ambassador to Constantinople, Count Anton Prokesch-Osten in 1872 who gave it to the library. The manuscript dates to 700-725 CE based on the style of punctuation, which was only used for a short amount of time. It contains the Quran from 2:97-7:205 and Q 9:19-29 written on 104 folios.

=== Samarkand Kufic Quran ===
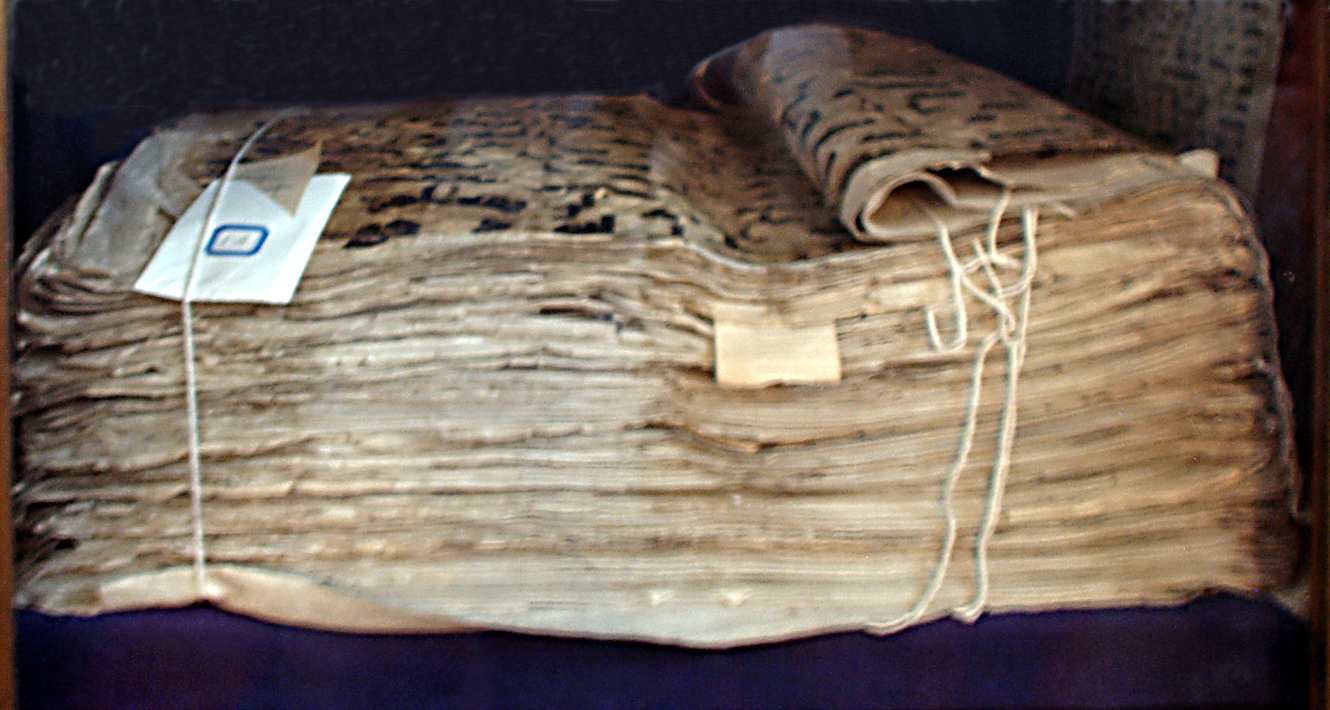
The Samarkand manuscript, now kept in Tashkent

The Samarkand Kufic Quran, preserved at Tashkent, is a Kufic manuscript, in Uzbek tradition identified as one of Uthman's manuscripts, but dated to the 8th or 9th century by both paleographic studies and carbon-dating of the parchment, which showed a 95.4% probability of a date between 795 and 855.

Gilchrist's dating of any Kufic manuscript to the later 8th century has been criticized by other scholars, who have cited many earlier instances of early Kufic and pre-Kufic inscriptions. The most important of these are the Quranic inscriptions in Kufic script from the founding of the Dome of the Rock in Jerusalem (692). Inscriptions on rock Hijazi and early Kufic script may date as early as 646. The debate between the scholars has moved from one over the date of origin of the script to one over the state of development of the Kufic script in the early manuscripts and in datable 7th-century inscriptions.

=== Palermo Quran ===
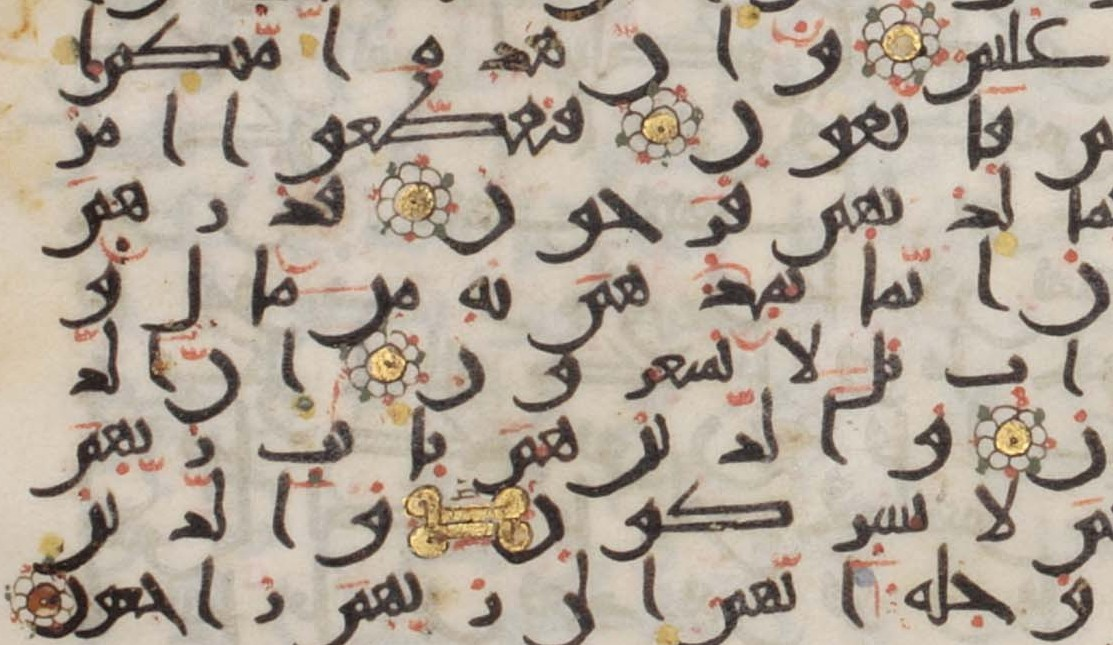
Detail of the Palermo Quran showing vocalisation markings (coloured dots) and verse markers (in gold)

The Palermo Quran was written in Palermo, Sicily in AH 372 (982 or 3 CE) when Sicily was part of the Fatimid Caliphate. It is the oldest surviving Quran manuscript from Muslim Sicily. Most of it is located in the library of the Nuruosmaniye Mosque in Istanbul. Two quires (bound groups of folios) are in the Khalili Collection of Islamic Art and a further two quires are missing. Although it dates from the late tenth century CE, the Palermo Quran shares stylistic and material features with Quran manuscripts from the eighth and ninth centuries, including the use of parchment rather than paper. It thus illustrates the conservatism of Western Islamic culture.

=== Gotthelf Bergsträßer Archive ===
This almost complete Quranic manuscript was photographed by Otto Pretzl in 1934 in Morocco. In recent years, a few folios have been sold by private companies and were dated to the 9th century or earlier by the Christie's auction house.

=== Isfahan Quran ===
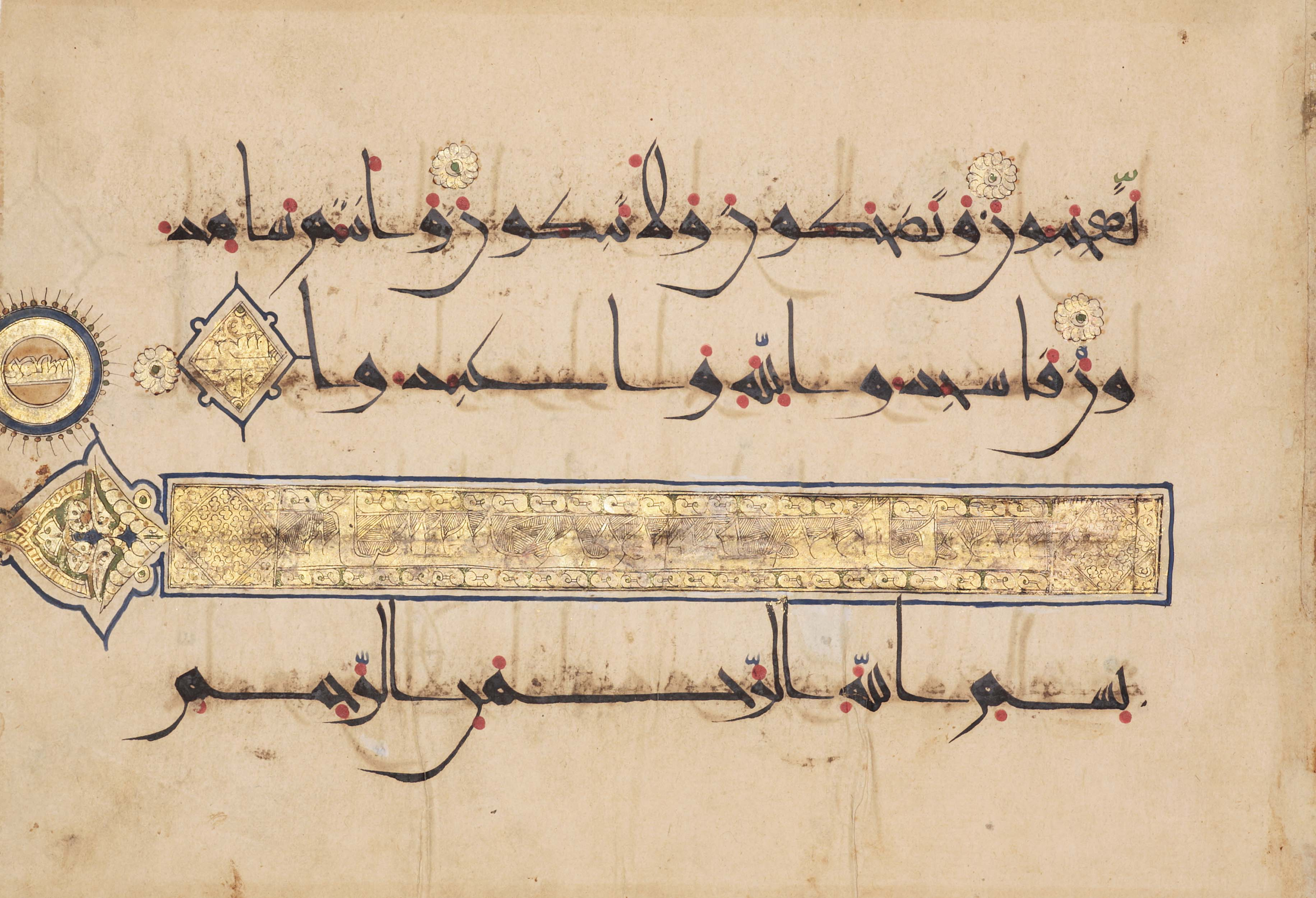
The Isfahan Quran

The Isfahan Quran was written in Isfahan in AH 383 (993 CE). It is now dispersed between multiple collections, with folios in the Turkish and Islamic Arts Museum in Istanbul, the Metropolitan Museum of Art, the Khalili Collection of Islamic Art, the Freer Gallery of Art, and the Minneapolis Institute of Art. Its format and calligraphy have features that were new in the tenth century: paper rather than parchment, a more ornate form of script, and the use of coloured ink markings.

=== Miniature Single-volume Quran ===
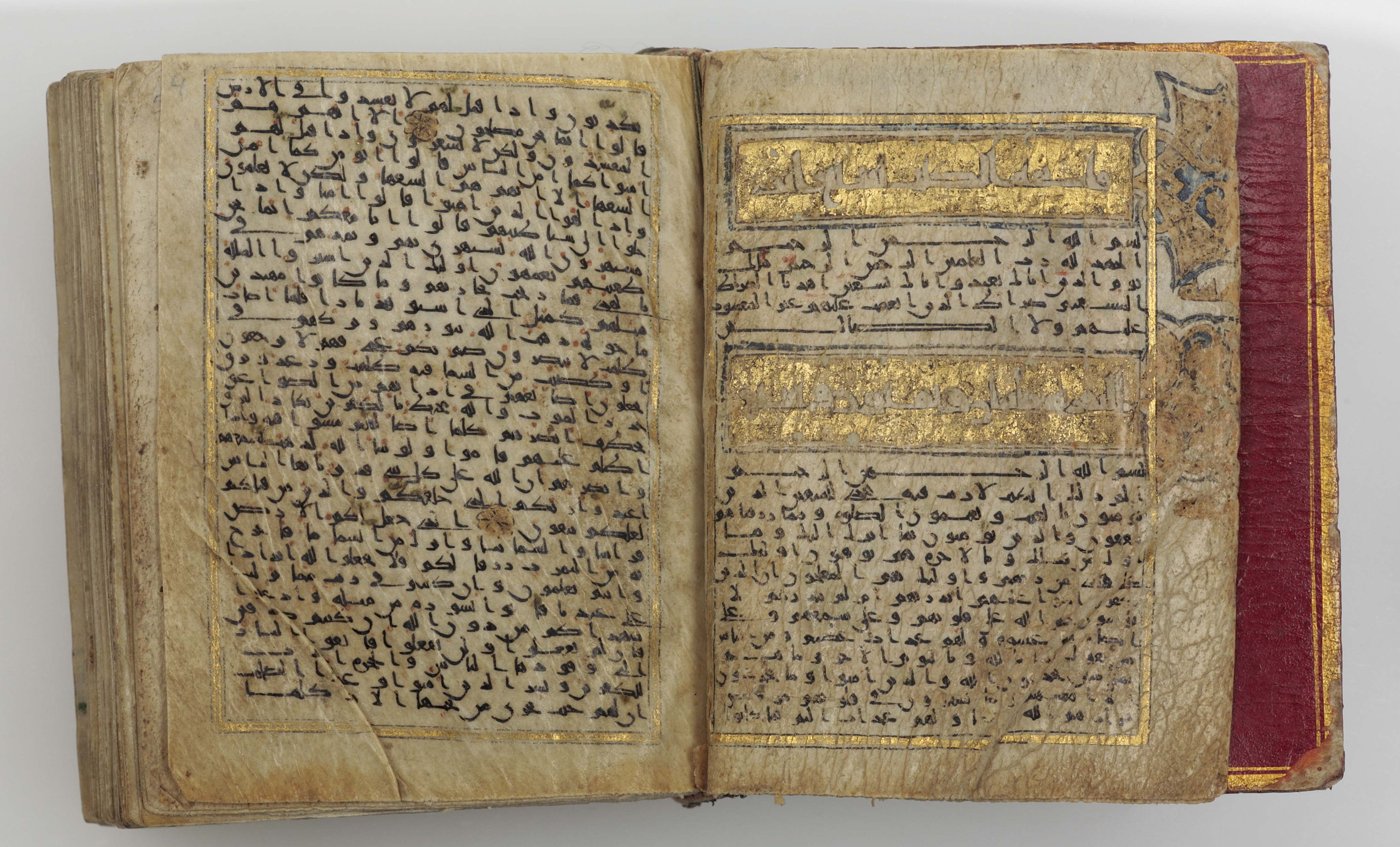
Miniature Single-volume Qur'an

This manuscript in the Khalili Collection of Islamic Art (QUR 430) dates from the late 10th century Middle East. It consists of 166 folios, each 7.3 centimetres (2.9 in) by 6.0 centimetres (2.4 in), with 30 lines per folio of Kufic script.

== Other manuscripts ==
=== The Ma'il Quran ===
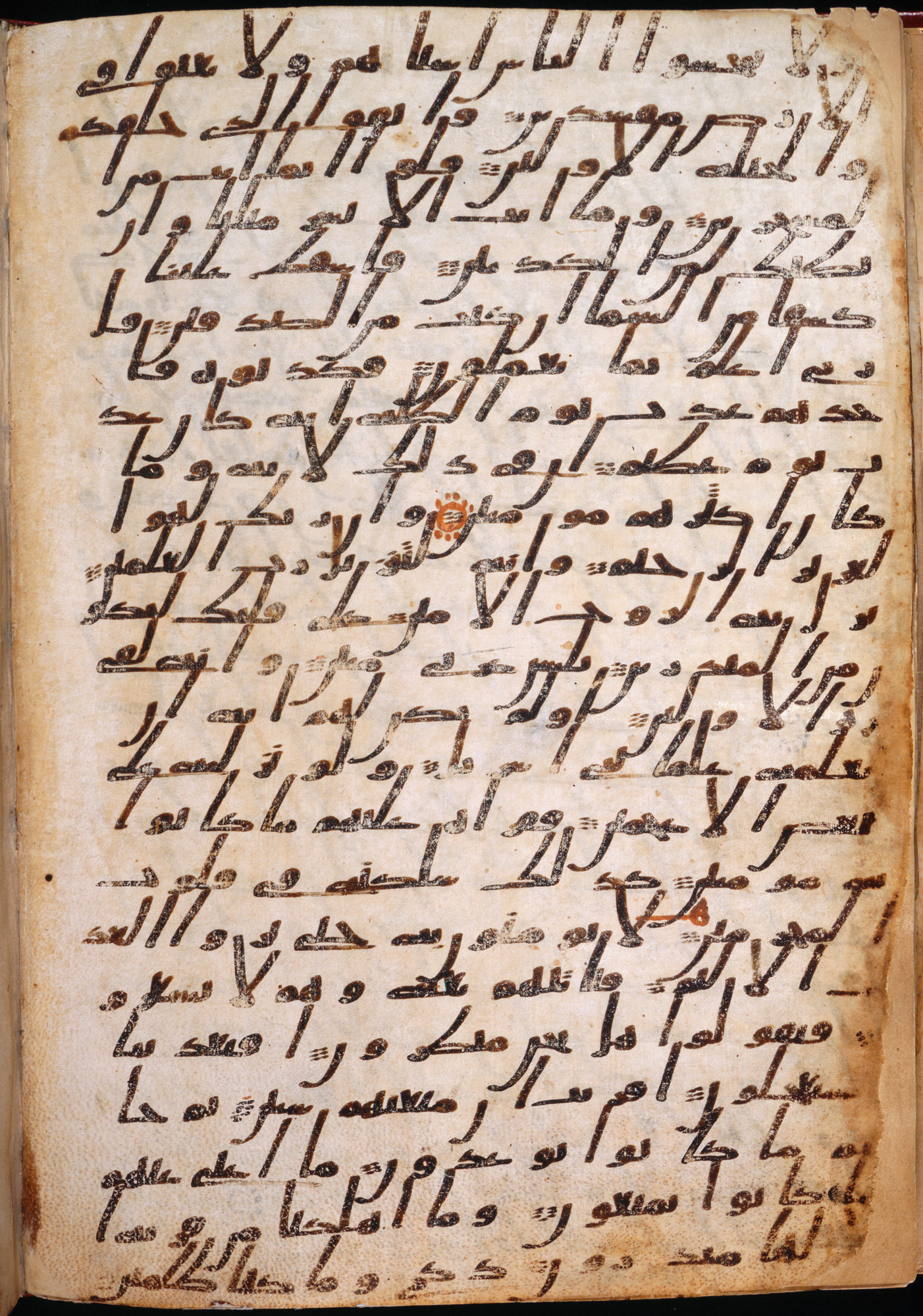
Page from the Ma'il Qur'an. Hijaz, 8th century. British Library

The Ma'il Quran is an 8th-century Quranic manuscript originating from the Arabian peninsula. It contains two-thirds of the Qur'ān text and is one of the oldest Qur'āns in the world. It was purchased by the British Museum in 1879 from the Reverend Greville John Chester and is now kept in the British Library.

== Significance ==
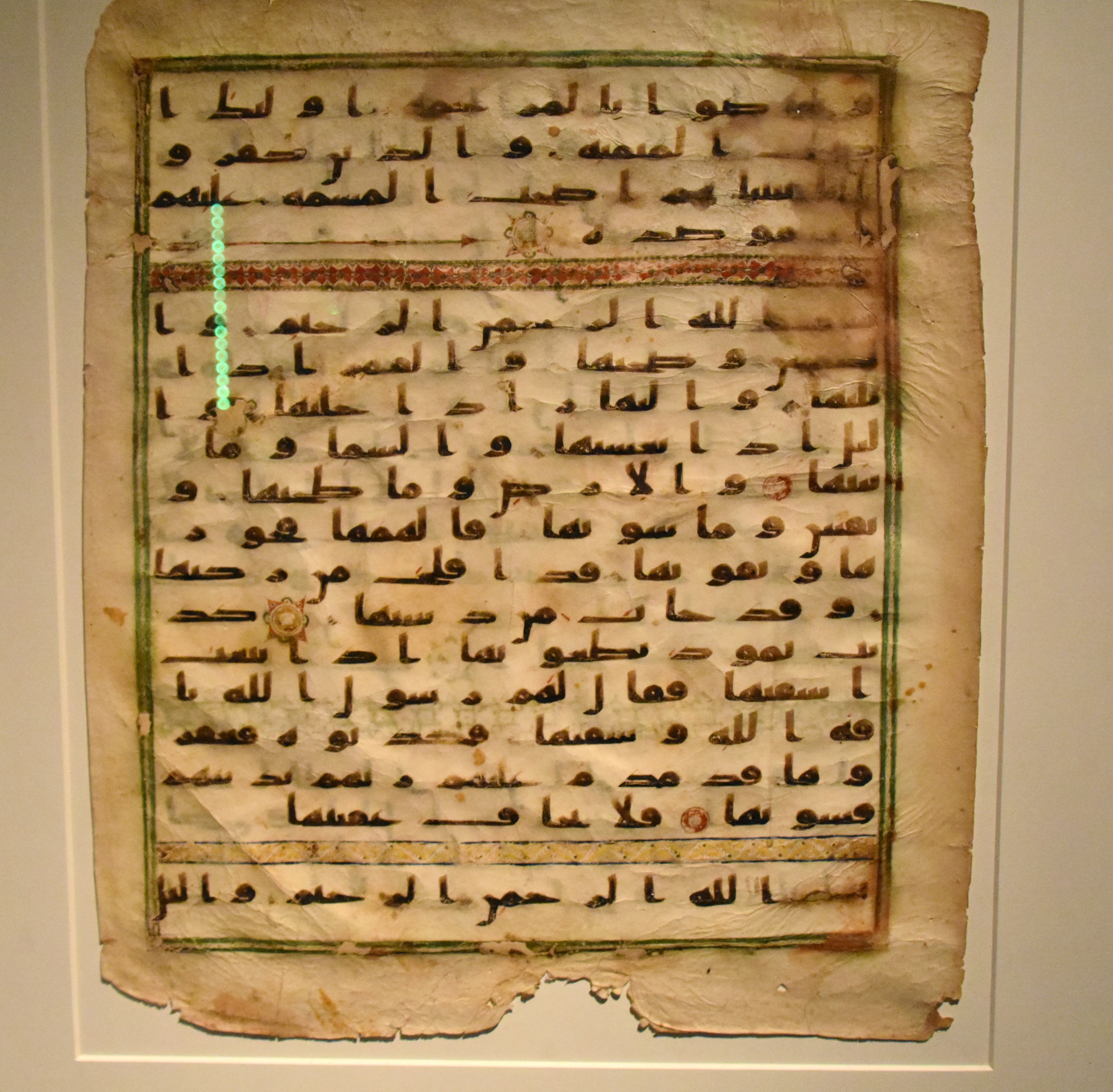
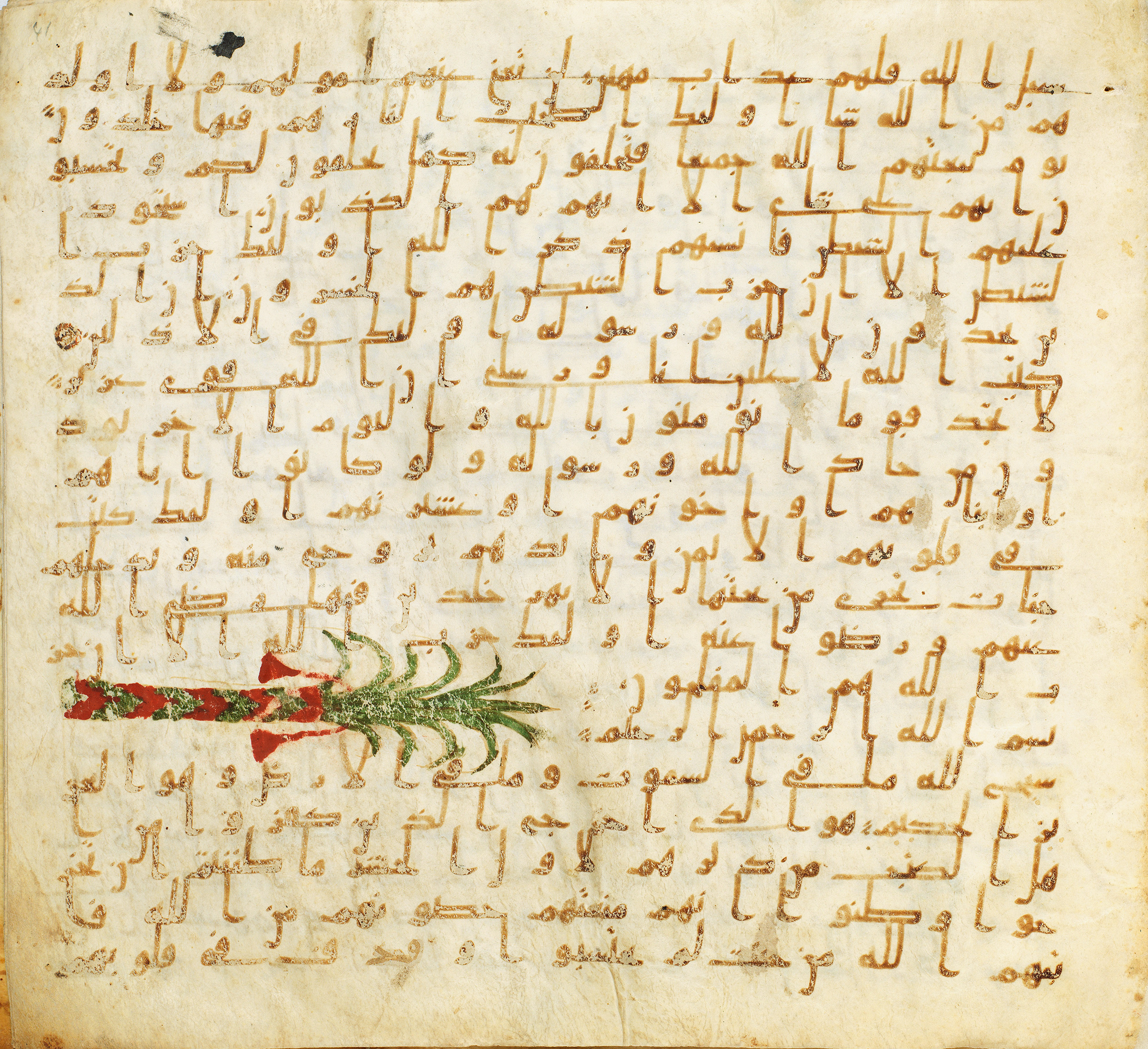
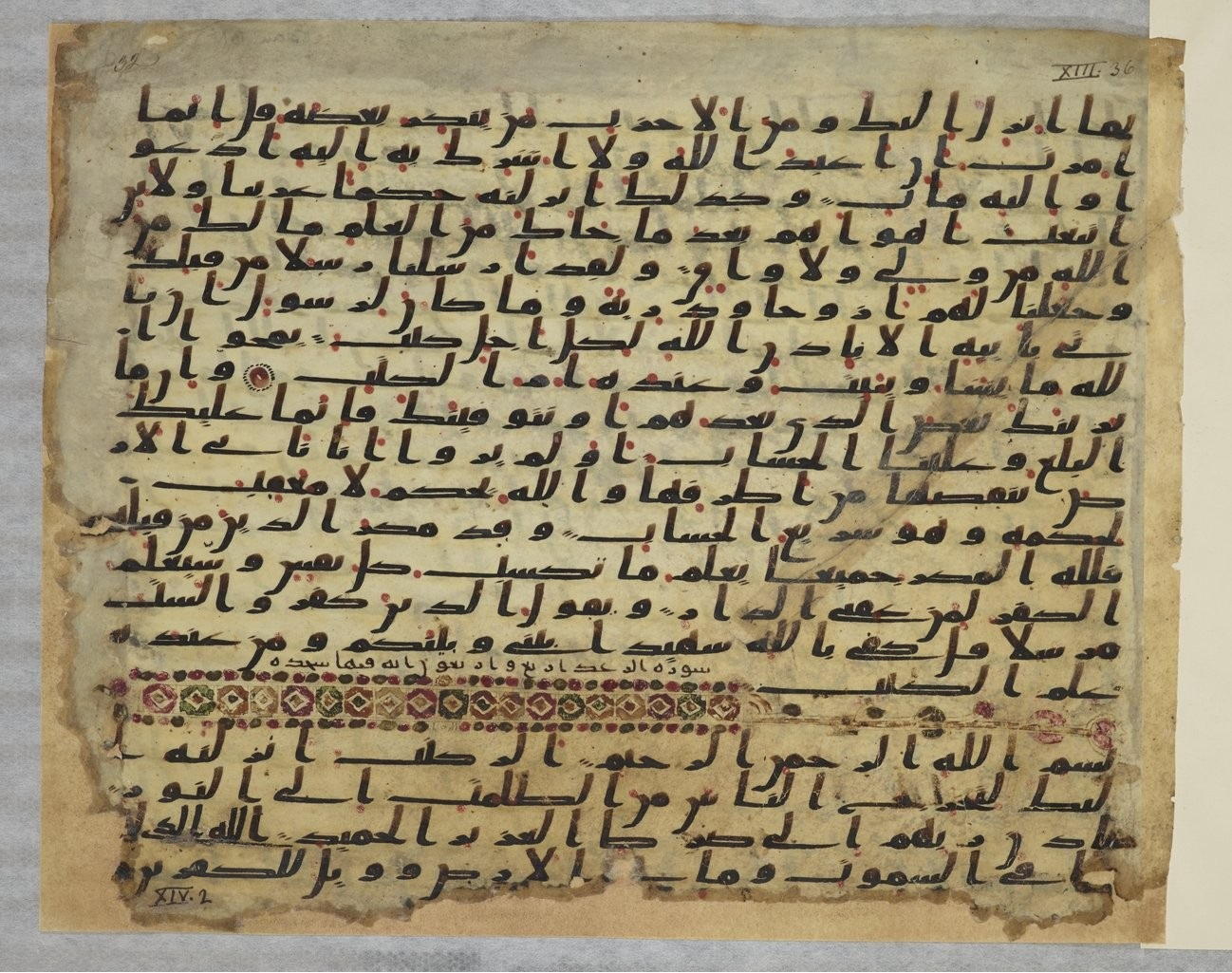
Pages with motifs and patterns from several early mus'hafs.

The dating and text of early manuscripts of the Qur'an have been used as evidence in support of the traditional Islamic views and by sceptics to cast doubt on it. The high number of manuscripts and fragments present from the first 100 years after the reported canonization have made the text one ripe for academic discussion. Founder of the revisionist Islamic studies movement in the mid 20th century, John Wansbrough, used the content in the Qur'an as a reference point for ascertaining that it was likely influenced by the Umayyad court, and believed its canon to have likely happened around the same time as that of the Islamic Hadith movement. Although never the dominant academic view, with the advent of radiocarbon dating, the view is currently held only by a few scholars.

The more recently uncovered Birmingham Quran manuscript has scholarly significance because of its early dating and potential overlap with the lifetime of Muhammad c. 570 to 632 CE. The proposed radiocarbon dating gives a 95.4% probability that the animal whose skin made the manuscript parchment was killed sometime between calendar years 568–645 CE. The text's identical reflection of the contemporary standard text of the Quran has generally lent credence to early Muslim narratives and provided a retort for historic criticisms levied at the text. Emilio Platti, Professor Emeritus at the Catholic University of Leuven, for example holds that "scholars largely refuse today the late dating of the earliest copies of the Qurʾān proposed for example by John Wansbrough". David Thomas, professor of Christianity and Islam at the University of Birmingham, states that "the parts of the Qur’an that are written on this parchment can, with a degree of confidence, be dated to less than two decades after Muhammad’s death."

Joseph Lumbard also claims that the dating renders "the vast majority of Western revisionist theories regarding the historical origins of the Quran untenable," and quotes a number of scholars (Harald Motzki, Nicolai Sinai) in support of "a growing body of evidence that the early Islamic sources, as Carl Ernst observes, 'still provide a more compelling framework for understanding the Qurʾan than any alternative yet proposed.'"

Behnam Sadeghi and Uwe Bergmann write that the Sana'a manuscript is unique among extant early Quranic manuscripts, "the only known manuscript" that "does not belong to the 'Uṯmānic textual tradition". Those Hijazi manuscript fragments belonging to the "'Uṯmānic textual tradition" and dated by radio-carbon to the first Islamic century are not identical. They fall "into a small number of regional families (identified by variants in their rasm, or consonantal text), and each moreover contains non-canonical variants in dotting and lettering that can often be traced back to those reported of the Companions"

Michael Cook and Marijn van Putten have provided evidence that the regional variants of the early Hijazi manuscript fragments share a "stem" and thus likely "descend from a single archetype", (that being Uthmanic codex in traditional Islamic history). Van Putten further observes that the early fragments are "word-for-word identical to the text as we have it today," which favours an early canonization of the Qur'anic text.

== See also ==
- Arabic miniature § Origins
- History of the Quran
- Quranic inerrancy
- Harari Qurans

== Sources ==
- Berg, Herbert (2000). "15. The Implications of, and Opposition to, the Methods and Theories of John Wansbrough". The Quest for the Historical Muhammad. New York: Prometheus Books. pp. 489–509.
- Böwering, Gerhard (2007). "Recent Research on the Construction of the Qur'an". In Reynolds, Gabriel (ed.). The Qur'an in its Historical Context. Routledge. doi:10.4324/9780203939604. ISBN 978-1-134-10945-6.
- Cook, Michael (2000). The Koran : A Very Short Introduction. Oxford University Press. ISBN 0192853449.
- Johns, Jeremy (2018). "The Palermo Quran (ah 372/982–3 ce) and its Historical Context". In Anderson, Glaire D.; Fenwick, Corisande; Rosser-Owen, Mariam (eds.). The Aghlabids and their Neighbors: Art and Material Culture in Ninth-Century North Africa. Leiden: Brill. pp. 587–610. doi:10.1163/9789004356047_030. ISBN 9789004356047. OCLC 1259183712.
- Donner, Fred M. (2008). "The Quran in Recent Scholarship". In Reynolds, Gabriel Said (ed.). The Quran in its Historical Context. Routledge. pp. 29-50. ISBN 978-1-134-10945-6. Archived from the original on 2013-07-18. Alt URL
- Rogers, J. M. (2008). The arts of Islam : treasures from the Nasser D. Khalili collection (Revised and expanded ed.). Abu Dhabi: Tourism Development & Investment Company (TDIC). OCLC 455121277.
- Wansbrough, J. (1978). Quranic Studies: Sources and Methods of Scriptural Interpretation (PDF). Oxford. Archived from the original (PDF) on 29 July 2020.
