= Birmingham Quran manuscript =

Hijazi-script Quranic manuscript

- Cadbury Research Library, University of Birmingham
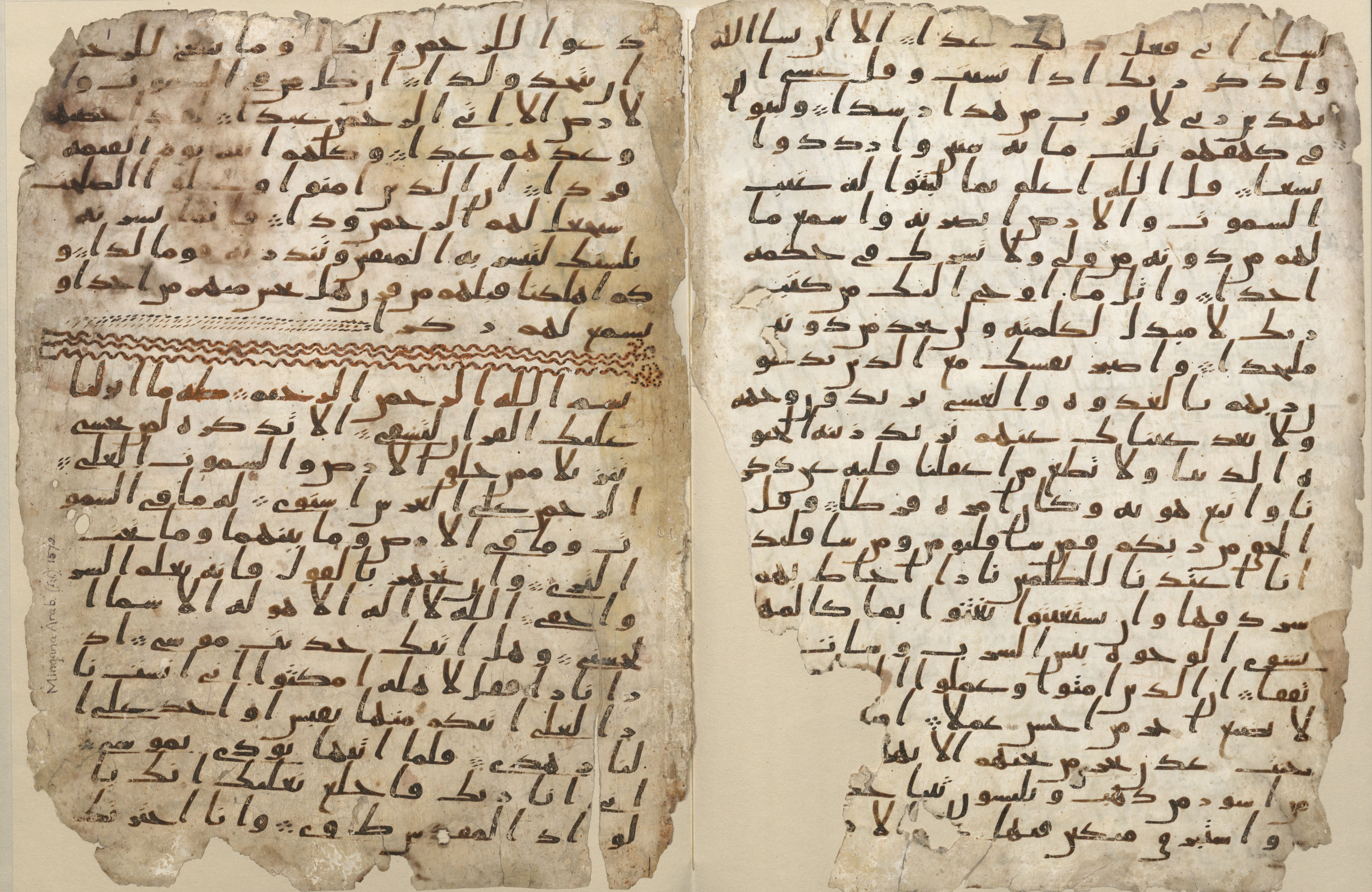
- folio 1 verso (right) and folio 2 recto
- Date: 7th century CE
- Language: Arabic
- Scribe: Unknown
- Material: Parchment; ink
- Format: Vertical
- Script: Hijazi
- Contents: Parts of Surahs 19 to 20
- Accession: 1572a

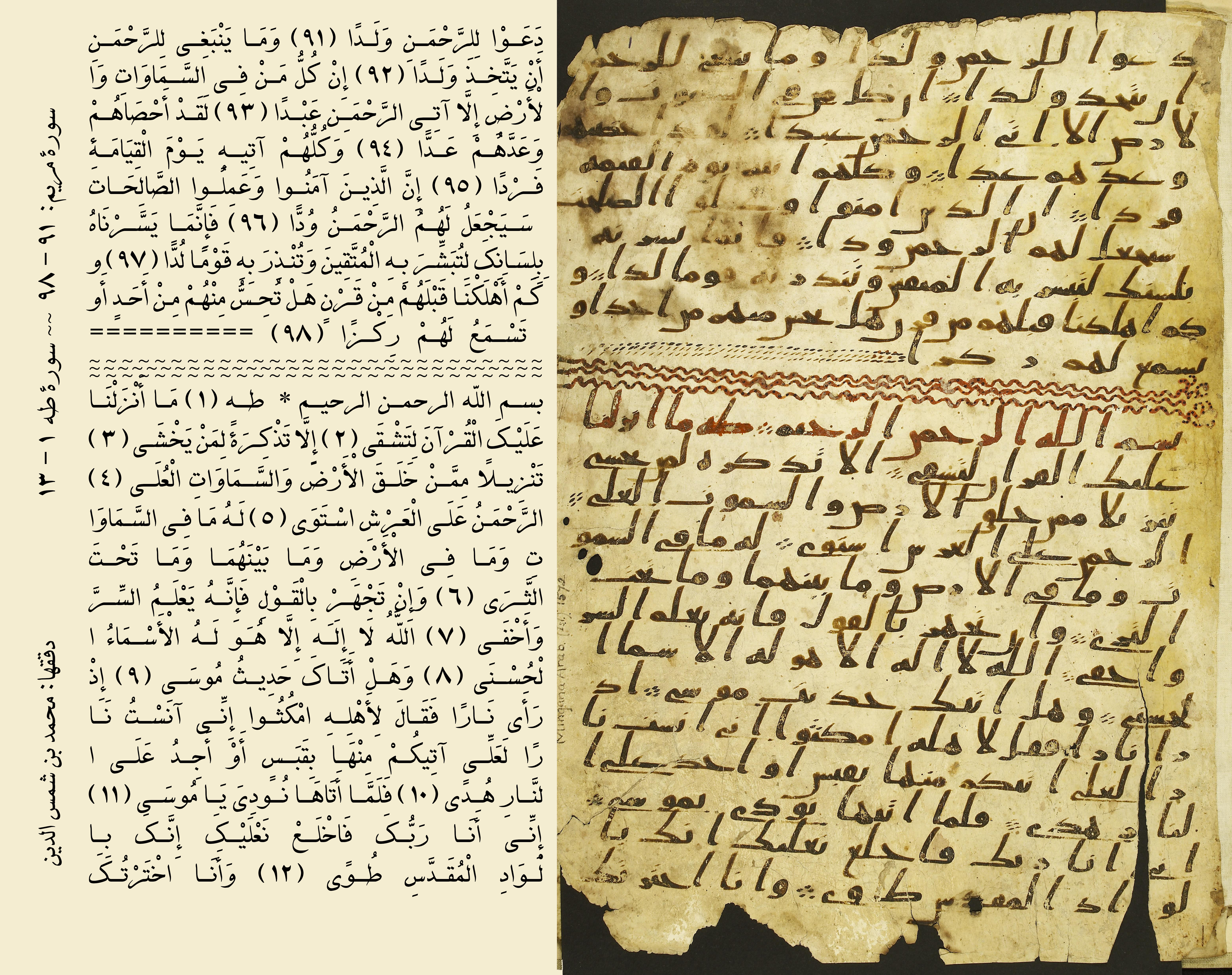
Comparison of a 20th-century edition of the Quran (left) and the Birmingham Quran manuscript (right)

The Birmingham Quran manuscript comprises two leaves of parchment from an early Quranic manuscript or muṣḥaf. In 2015, the manuscript, which is held by the University of Birmingham in England, was radiocarbon dated to between 568 and 645 CE. It is presently believed that the manuscript is an early descendant of the Uthmanic codex. It is part of the Mingana Collection of Middle Eastern manuscripts, held by the university's Cadbury Research Library.

The manuscript is written in ink on parchment, using an Arabic Hijazi script and is still clearly legible. The leaves preserve parts of Surahs 19 (Maryam) to 20 (Taha). It was on display at the University of Birmingham in 2015 and then at Birmingham Museum and Art Gallery until 5 August 2016. The Cadbury Research Library has carried out multispectral analysis of the manuscript and XRF analysis of the inks.

== Background ==
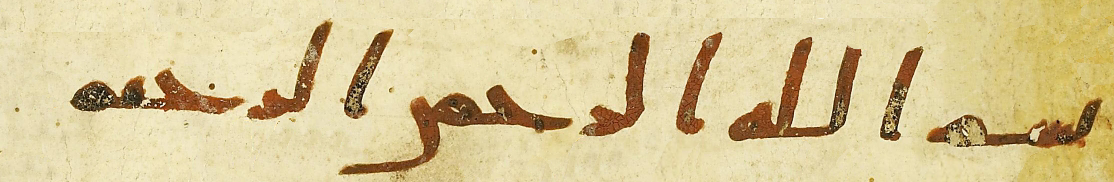
The Basmala as written on the Birmingham muṣḥaf manuscript, the oldest surviving copy of the Quran. Rasm: "ٮسم الله الرحمں الرحىم"

The Mingana Collection, comprising over 3,000 documents, was collected by Alphonse Mingana over three trips to the Middle East in the 1920s and was funded by Edward Cadbury, a philanthropist and businessman of the Birmingham-based chocolate-manufacturing Cadbury family.

== Description ==
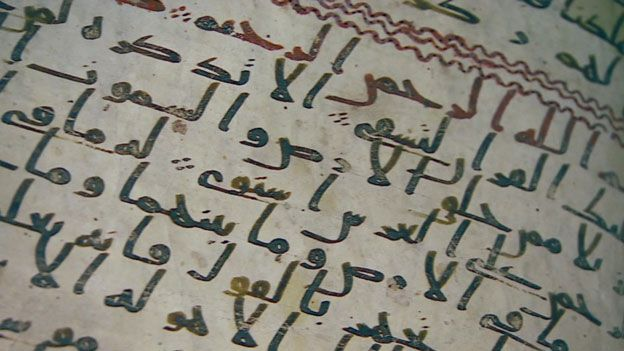
Close-up of part of folio 2 recto, showing chapter division and verse-end markings in Hijazi script

The two leaves have been recognised as belonging with the 16 leaves catalogued as BnF Arabe 328(c) in the Bibliothèque Nationale de France in Paris, now bound with the Codex Parisino-petropolitanus, and witness verses corresponding to a lacuna in that document.

The Birmingham pages, now catalogued as Mingana 1572a, are folio size (343mm by 258mm; 13½" x 10¼" at the widest point), and are written on both sides in a generously scaled and legible script. One two-page leaf contains verses 17–31 of Surah 18 (Al-Kahf) while the other leaf the final eight verses 91–98 of Surah 19 (Maryam) and the first 40 verses of Surah 20 (Ta-Ha), all in their present day sequence and conforming to the standard text. The two surviving pages were separated in the original codex by a number of missing folios containing the intervening verses of surahs 18 and 19. There are no diacritical marks to indicate short vowels, but consonants are occasionally differentiated with oblique dashes. The text is laid out in the format that was to become standard for complete Quran manuscripts, with chapter divisions indicated by a decorated line, and verse endings by intertextual clustered dots.

Although the Quran text witnessed in the two Birmingham leaves almost entirely conforms to the standard text, their orthography differs, in respect of the writing (or omission) of the silent alif (ألف). Arabic script at the time tended to not write out the silent alif. Subsequent ultraviolet testing of the leaves has confirmed no underwriting, and excludes the possibility of there being a palimpsest.

In a detailed analysis of the Mingana 1572a and BnF Arabe 328(c) folios in combination, dubbed MS PaB in her thesis, Alba Fedeli summarised her findings:

A comparison between the copy of MS PaB and the Medina muṣḥaf leads to a number of differences being identified. These variants can be understood as a mirror of the linguistic competence of the copy-er and his linguistic context, in that the manuscript bears some phonetic, orthographic, morphologic and syntactic variants, but also a few lexical variants, among which there are variants related to the voice and recipient of the message and some variants due to mechanical errors during the copying activity. Lastly, the manuscript exhibits a few peculiar features as regards the subdivision of the Qur’ānic text into verses. Furthermore, the analysis of the manuscript text compared with the literature of the Islamic tradition reveals a few qirā’āt that are substantiated through the manuscript itself.

== Identification ==
Alba Fedeli, who was studying items in the Mingana Collection of Middle Eastern Manuscripts for her PhD thesis Early Qur'ānic manuscripts, their text, and the Alphonse Mingana papers held in the Department of Special Collections of the University of Birmingham, found the two leaves misidentified and bound with those of another seventh-century Quranic manuscript also written in Hijazi script (now catalogued as Mingana 1572b). Following an approach by the Berlin-Brandenburg Academy in 2013 to contribute a sample from Islamic Arabic 1572 to the Corpus Coranicum project to investigate textual history of the Quran, which coincided with Fedeli's research into the handwriting, the Cadbury Research Library arranged for the manuscript to be radiocarbon dated at the University of Oxford's Radiocarbon Accelerator Unit. They determined the radiocarbon date of the parchment to be 1465±21 years BP (before 1950), which corresponds with 95.4% confidence to the calendar years CE 568–645 when calibrated.

== Significance ==
The proposed radiocarbon date possibility for the manuscript is significant, as the Islamic prophet Muhammad lived from c. 570 to 632. According to Sunni Muslim tradition it was Abu Bakr (r. 632–634), the first caliph, who compiled the Quran, and Uthman (r. 644–656) the third caliph, who canonised the standard version of Quran since accepted. With the canonisation, Uthman commanded that all earlier versions of the Quran be burned.

In the university announcement, Muhammad Isa Waley, Lead Curator for Persian and Turkish Manuscripts at the British Library, stated:

The Muslim community was not wealthy enough to stockpile animal skins for decades, and to produce a complete Mushaf, or copy, of the Holy Qur’an required a great many of them. The carbon dating evidence, then, indicates that Birmingham's Cadbury Research Library is home to some precious survivors that – in view of the Suras included – would once have been at the centre of a Mushaf from that period. And it seems to leave open the possibility that the Uthmanic redaction took place earlier than had been thought – or even, conceivably, that these folios predate that process. In any case, this – along with the sheer beauty of the content and the surprisingly clear Hijazi script – is news to rejoice Muslim hearts.

David Thomas, professor of Christianity and Islam at the University of Birmingham said:

The tests carried out on the parchment of the Birmingham folios yield the strong probability that the animal from which it was taken was alive during the lifetime of the Prophet Muhammad or shortly afterwards. This means that the parts of the Qur’an that are written on this parchment can, with a degree of confidence, be dated to less than two decades after Muhammad’s death. These portions must have been in a form that is very close to the form of the Qur’an read today, supporting the view that the text has undergone no alteration and that it can be dated to a point very close to the time it was believed to be revealed.

=== Debates over dating ===
Saud al-Sarhan, Director of Centre for Research and Islamic Studies in Riyadh, has been more skeptical, questioning whether the parchment might have been reused as a palimpsest, and also noting that the writing had chapter separators and dotted verse endings – features in Arabic scripts which are thought to not have been introduced to the Quran until later. The possibility of a palimpsest was later ruled out by ultraviolet testing. Saud's criticisms have been backed by a number of Saudi-based experts in Quranic history who deny that the manuscript could have been written during the lifetime of Muhammad. They emphasise that while Muhammad was alive, Quranic texts were written without any chapter decoration, marked verse endings or use of coloured inks, and did not follow any standard sequence of surahs. Some suggest the writing could date to the reign of caliph Uthman, while others suggest a date as late as the Umayyad period.

Popular history author Tom Holland stated that the manuscript's carbon dating "destabilises, to put it mildly, the idea that we can know anything with certainty about how the Quran emerged, [and] that in turn has implications for the historicity of Muhammad and [his followers]."

Keith Small, manuscript consultant to the Bodleian Library and research fellow at the London School of Theology, a private Christian theological college, concurred with Holland, saying:

This gives more ground to what have been peripheral views of the Quran’s genesis, like that Muhammad and his early followers used a text that was already in existence and shaped it to fit their own political and theological agenda, rather than Muhammad receiving a revelation from heaven.

Süleyman Berk of the faculty of Islamic studies at Yalova University has noted the strong similarity between the script of the Birmingham leaves and those of a number of Hijazi Qurans in the Turkish and Islamic Arts Museum, which were brought to Istanbul from the Great Mosque of Damascus following a fire in 1893. Berk recalls that these manuscripts had been intensively researched in association with an exhibition on the history of the Quran, The Quran in its 1,400th Year, held in Istanbul in 2010, and the findings published by François Déroche as Qur’ans of the Umayyads in 2013. In that study, the Paris Quran, BnF Arabe 328(c), is compared with Qurans in Istanbul, and concluded as having been written "around the end of the seventh century and the beginning of the eighth century."

Joseph E. B. Lumbard of Brandeis University has written in the Huffington Post in support of the dates proposed by the Birmingham scholars. Lumbard notes that if the discovery of a Quranic text that may be confirmed by radiocarbon dating as having been written in the first decades of the Islamic era, while presenting a text substantially in conformity with that traditionally accepted, reinforces a growing academic consensus that many Western sceptical and 'revisionist' theories of Quranic origins are now untenable in the light of empirical findings – whereas, on the other hand, counterpart accounts of Quranic origins within classical Islamic traditions stand up well in the light of ongoing scientific discoveries.

David Thomas pointed out that the radiocarbon testing found the death date of the animal whose skin made up the Quran, not the date when the Quran was written. Since blank parchment was often stored for years after being produced, he said the Quran could have been written as late as 650–655, during the Quranic codification under Uthman. Other experts consulted by the BBC said that "nothing should be ruled out" and that the date could be early as the first written Qurans under Abu Bakr.

In December 2015 François Déroche of the Collège de France confirmed the identification of the two Birmingham leaves with those of the Paris Qur'an BnF Arabe 328(c), as had been proposed by Alba Fedeli. Deroche, however, expressed reservations about the reliability of the radiocarbon dates proposed for the Birmingham leaves, noting instances elsewhere in which radiocarbon dating had proved inaccurate in testing Qurans with an explicit endowment date, and also that none of the counterpart Paris leaves had yet been carbon-dated. Mustafa Shah, Senior Lecturer in Islamic Studies at the School of Oriental and African Studies, has suggested that the grammatical marks and verse separators in the Birmingham leaves are inconsistent with the proposed early radiocarbon dates.

Jamal bin Huwareib, managing director of the Mohammed bin Rashid Al Maktoum Foundation, has proposed that, if the radiocarbon dates to be confirmed, the Birmingham/Paris Quran might be identified with the text known to have been assembled by the first Caliph Abu Bakr, between 632 and 634 CE. However, based on research from Alba Fedeli, Stephen J. Shoemaker has argued that it is extremely unlikely that the Birmingham manuscript was a pre-Uthmanic manuscript. Marijn van Putten, an academic expert on Quranic manuscripts and who has published work on idiosyncratic orthography common to all early manuscripts of the Uthmanic text type has stated and demonstrated with examples that due to a number of these same idiosyncratic spellings present in the Birmingham fragment (Mingana 1572a + Arabe 328c), it is "clearly a descendant of the Uthmanic text type" and that it is "impossible" that it is a pre-Uthmanic copy, despite the parchment's early radiocarbon dating.

== See also ==
- Sana'a manuscript – another Quranic manuscript written on parchment that was most likely produced in the 7th century
- Criticism of the Quran
- Historicity of Muhammad
- Early Quranic manuscripts
- Codex Parisino-petropolitanus
- Topkapı manuscript
- Samarkand Kufic Quran
- Historiography of early Islam
- Textual criticism
- Gerd R. Puin
