= Codex Parisino-petropolitanus =

Early Hijazi-script Quran manuscript

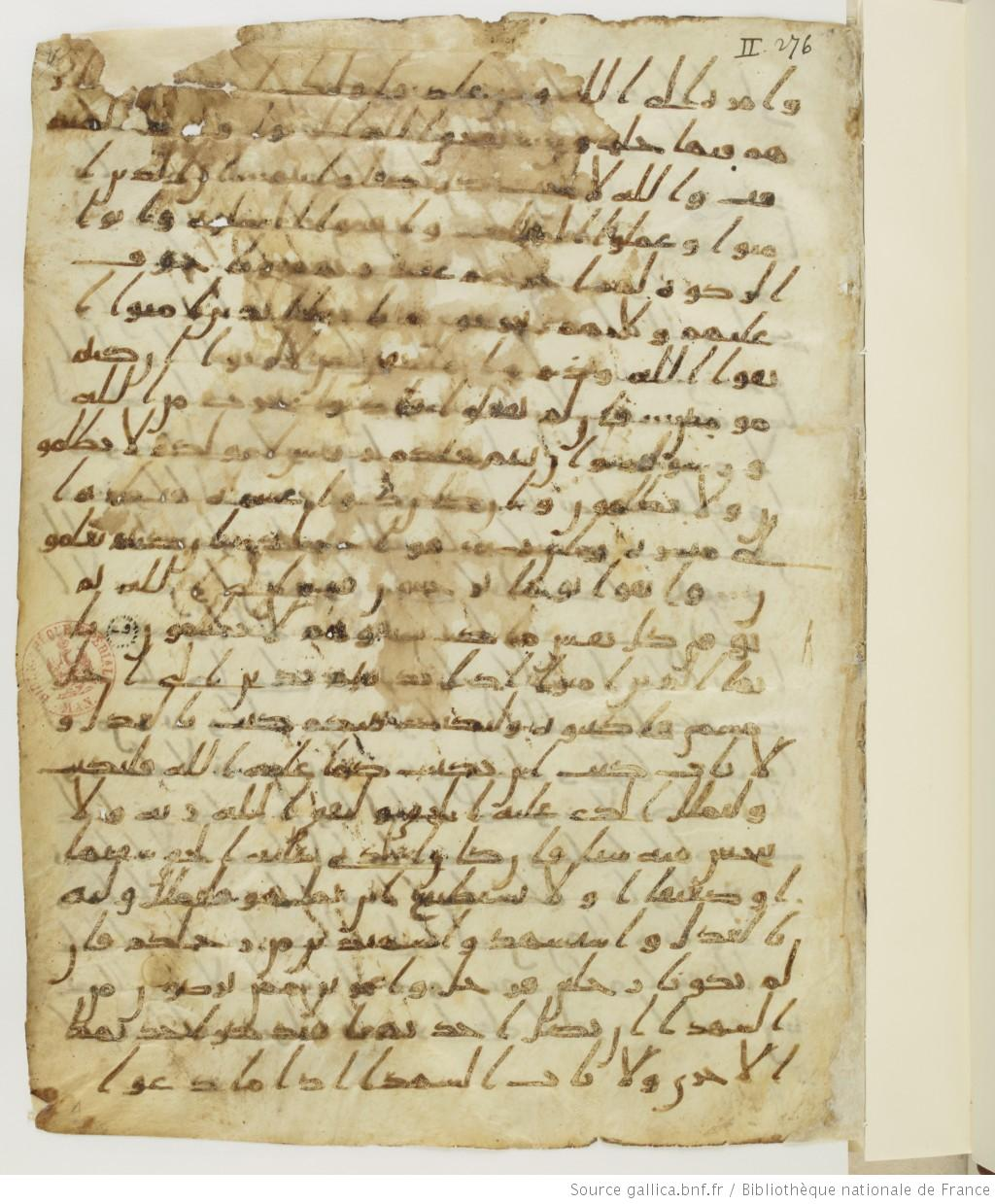
The recto of the first folio of codex Parisino-petropolitanus. The style is Hijazi script.

The Codex Parisino-Petropolitanus (CPP) is an early Quran manuscript. Its largest part is held at the Bibliothèque nationale de France, Paris, as BnF Arabe 328(ab), with 70 folios. Another 46 folios are kept in the National Library of Russia in Saint-Petersburg. Two additional folia have been preserved, one kept in the Vatican Library (Vat. Ar. 1605/1) and the other in the Khalili Collections in London (KFQ 60).

== The manuscript ==
BnF Arabe 328 consists of six parts, labelled a–f. Of these, parts (a) and (b) were later recognized as having formed part of a single original manuscript.

- BnF Arabe 328(a), 56 leaves (foll. 1–56), with additional leaves held by the Vatican Library, the Khalili Collection of Islamic Art and the National Library of Russia. This portion accounts for about 26% of the text of the Quran.
- BnF Arabe 328(b), 14 leaves (foll. 57–70).

The remaining four parts of BnF Arabe 328 are from different Quranic manuscripts.

- BnF Arabe 328(c), 16 leaves (foll. 71–86), with Birmingham Quran Manuscripts discovered in Birmingham and carbon-dated to before 645 (formerly bound with an unrelated late 7th century Quranic manuscript) in 2015.
- BnF Arabe 328(d), 3 leaves (foll. 87–89).
- BnF Arabe 328(e), 6 leaves (foll. 90–95).
- BnF Arabe 328(f), 2 leaves (foll. 96–97).

The manuscript Arabe 328(ab) is fragmentary. Originally it contained an estimated 210 to 220 leaves, of which 118 are extant (70 in Paris, 46 in Saint-Petersburg, and one each in Rome and London). The preserved text spans Quran 2:275 to Q72:2, with lacunae in between. Overall, it contains about 45% of the Quranic text. It was produced by five scribes, probably working concurrently in order to meet demand for a fast production. All of the hands use the Hijazi script.

François Déroche says that the production of Codex Parisino-petropolitanus could be dated as far back as the late 7th century CE (third quarter of the 1st century AH). David S. Powers agrees with this early date. Others agree with a date in the early 8th century CE, which Déroche also advocated in some of his earlier work. Still others suggest significantly later dates.

Déroche writes of many mere orthographic differences between the text of the codex Parisino-petropolitanus and the standard text of today. The contents of the text are not substantially different from those of today's Quran. Some remaining differences can be explained as copyist mistakes. A few others are substantive variants according to Déroche, including some non-canonical variants. Powers says that some of these substantive variants show that the text of the Quran remained "fluid" and open to change until the end of the 7th century. Powers's book focuses on the fluidity of a single verse of the Qur'an.

== History ==
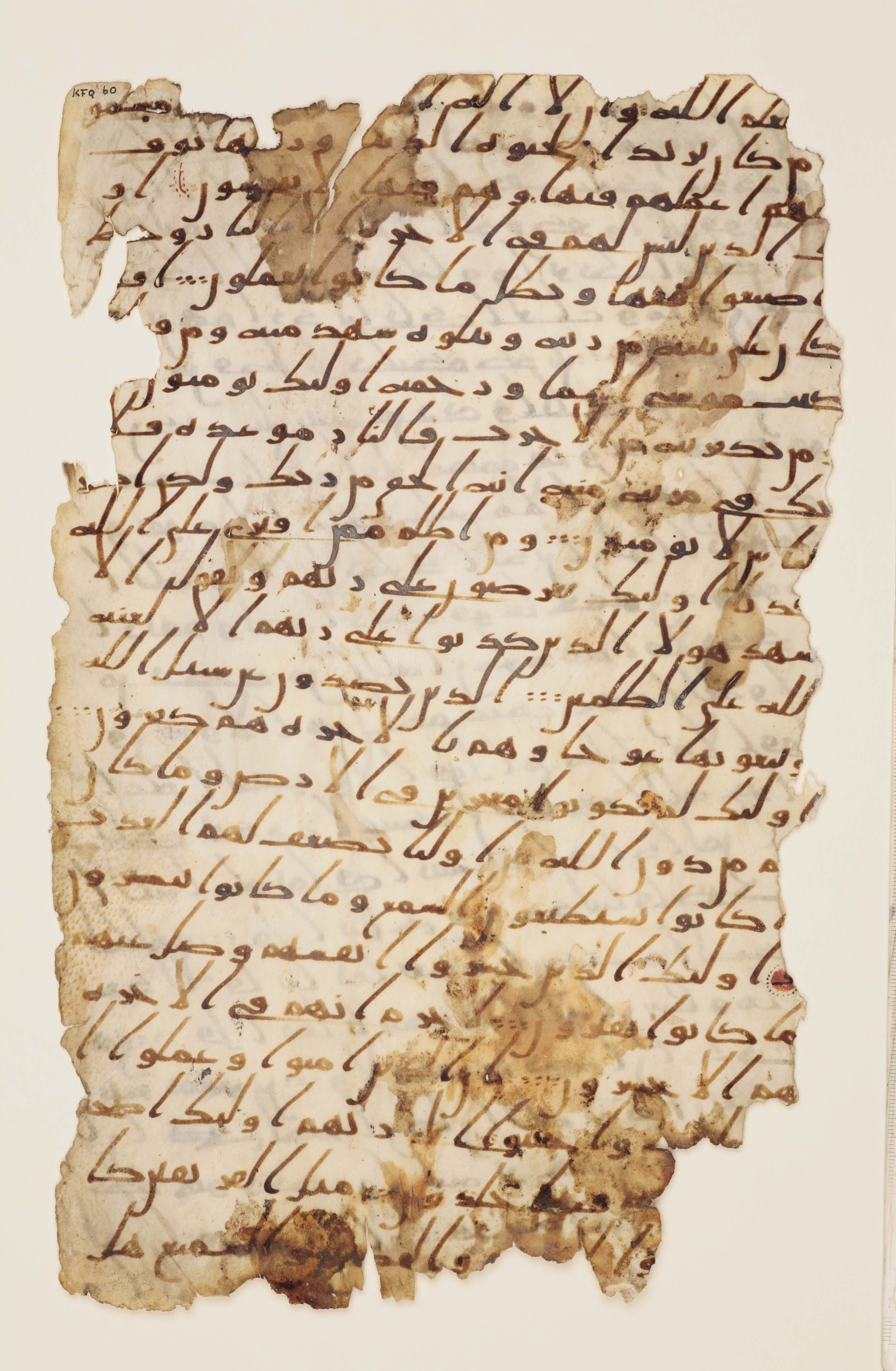
The Khalili Collections folio

The manuscript had been stored with other Quranic manuscripts in the Mosque of Amr ibn al-As in Fustat, Egypt. During the Napoleonic expedition to Egypt in 1798/99, French Arabist Jean-Joseph Marcel (1776–1856) looted a first lot of folios. A few more pages were bought by Jean-Louis Asselin de Cherville (1772–1822) when he served as vice-consul in Cairo some years later. Cherville's collection of Arabic manuscripts were sold to the Bibliothèque nationale after his death in 1822. The portion bought by Jean-Joseph Marcel was sold by his heiress to the Russian government and in 1864 became part of the collection of the Public Imperial Library (now National Library of Russia) in Saint-Petersburg.

Besides the portions bought by Marcel and de Cherville, two additional folia reached Europe separately, one is now in the Vatican Library (Vat. Ar. 1605/1) and the other in the Khalili Collection of Islamic Art in London (KFQ 60). In the 1983 catalogue of the BnF, foll. 1–56 were described as a separate entity, Arabe 328(a), from foll. 57–70, Arabe 328(b). It was only later realised that the two parts once formed part of the same manuscript.
