= Mashq =

Calligraphic form of Arabic script

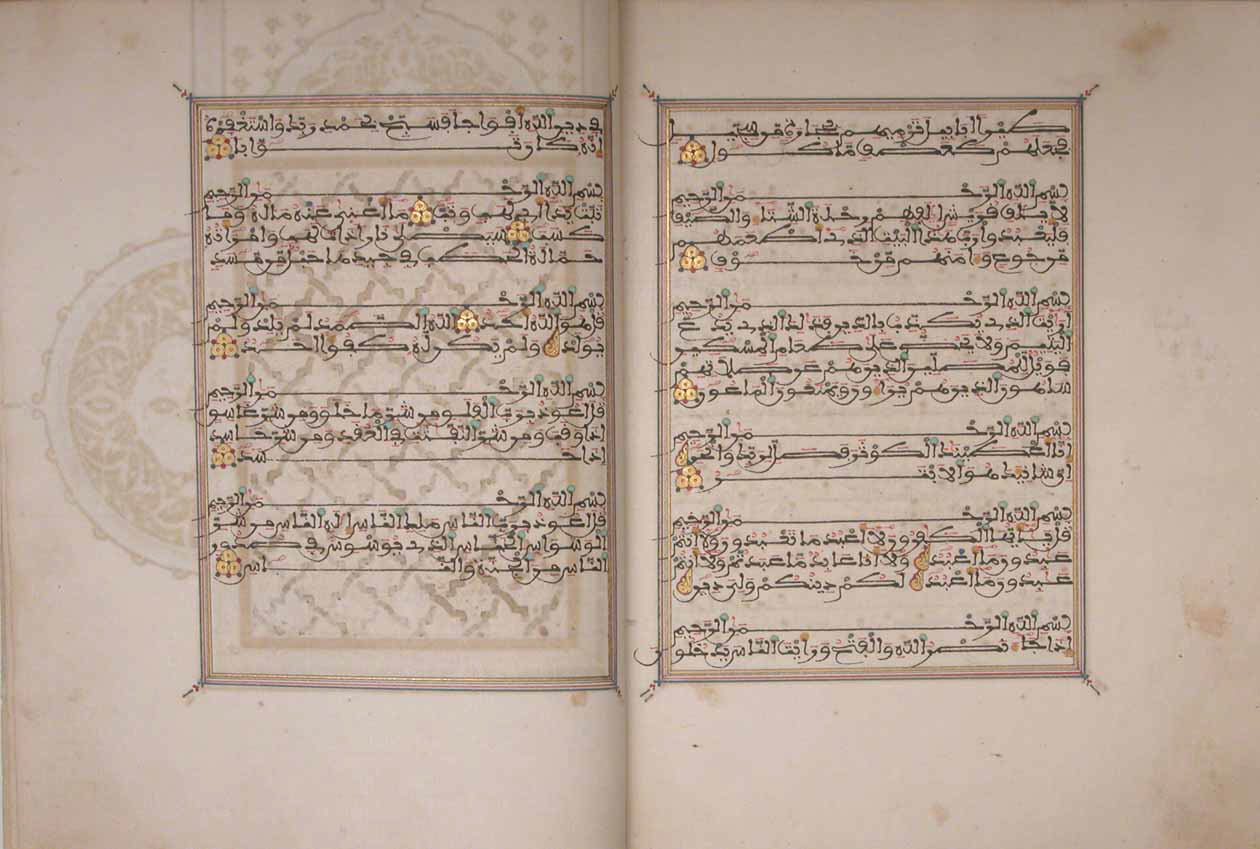
Mashq elongations in the Maghrebi script used to write surahs 105–114 of an 18th-century Maghrebi Quran.

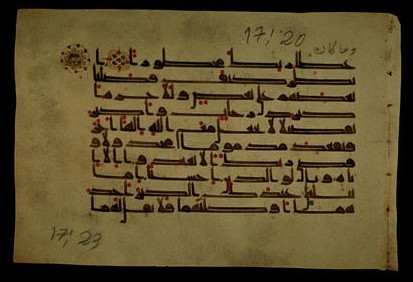
Qur'anic manuscript of Surah 17: Al-Isra written in Kufic script with mashq extensions.

Mashq (Arabic: مَشْق) is one of the oldest calligraphic forms of the Arabic script. At the time of the emergence of Islam, this type of writing was likely already in use in various parts of the Arabian Peninsula. It is first attested during the reign of caliph Umar, making it one of the earliest forms of Arabic script, along with Hijazi and Kufic. It was used in most texts produced during the first and second centuries after the Hijra.

== Etymology ==
In Arabic, مَشَقَ mashaqa means "to stretch out" and the name مَشْق mashq references the fact that the letters د ,ص ,ط ,ك, and ى (as well as their dotted counterparts) are written stretched out. Mashq calligraphy is also notable for the shortened intervals between words.

The Arabic term for this script spread as a loanword throughout the Muslim world as the Arabic writing system spread. For example, mashq is known as meşk in Turkish and is practiced by present-day calligraphers.

== See also ==
- Ancient North Arabian script
- Ancient South Arabian script
- Hijazi script
- Kufic
- Muhaqqaq
- Naskh
- Persian calligraphy
- Rayhan
- Tawqi
- Thuluth
