= Harari Qurans =

Qurans from the Harari region of Ethiopia

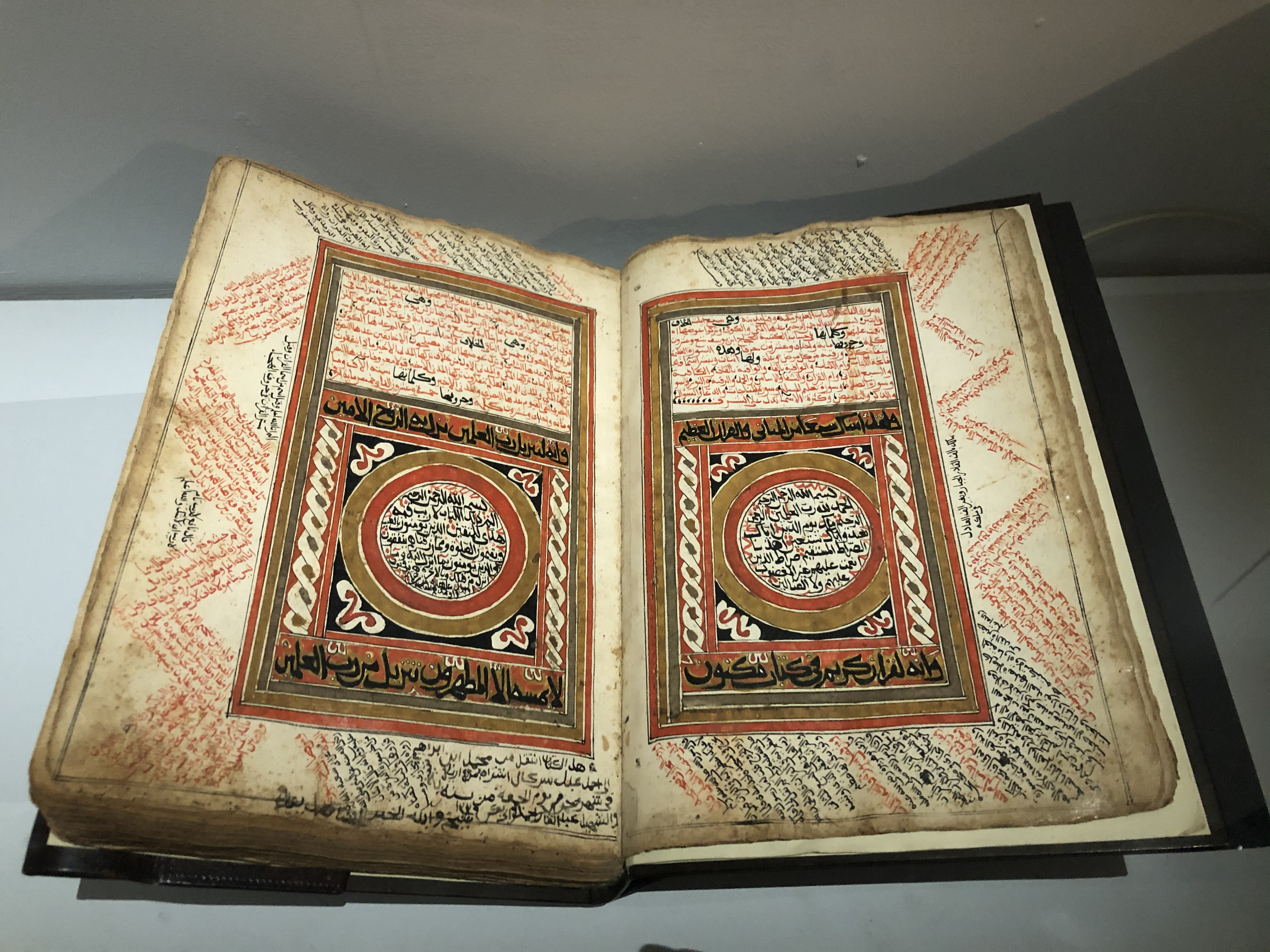
Harari Quran in Ethiopian script

Harari Qurans have been produced in the Harari region of Ethiopia since the 18th century; its central city of Harar has a strong tradition of scribal practice, drawing on both local and international artistic culture to create a unique Quranic style.

Harari Qurans are the product of cross-cultural interactions in a deeply religious city. The manuscripts created by Harari scribes in the 18th and 19th centuries contain stylistic references to Qurans from pre-Mughal India and Mamluk Egypt, including elements of the Indian Bihari script and distinctive zigzagging marginal glosses, while much of their ornamentation shares commonalities with that of earlier Mamluk Qurans. They are often written in Arabic, or in Arabic-derived Ajami script, on Italian paper.

== Harar at the crossroads ==
Harar is located at the intersection of several major trade routes, connected to Asia via the Indian Ocean and silk roads, to routes across North Africa, and to the Middle East and Europe. Thanks to its position at this crossroads, the city became an early hub of Islam in East Africa. Harar is also a holy site for many pilgrims, as it is home to dozens of shrines to saints. This, combined with a strong culture of literature and manuscript production, has historically made Harar an important cultural, economic, and religious center.

Though its manuscript production began to die out in the 19th century, Harar is still known for the sheer number of manuscripts—particularly Qurans—it holds in museums, mosques, and private collections. These Qurans can be found in collections and exhibitions around the world. Nineteenth century British officer Richard Burton describing Harar's books states:

Books at Harar are mostly antiques, copyists being exceedingly rare, and the square massive character is more like Cufic with diacritical points, than the graceful modern Naskhi. I could not, however, but admire the bindings: no Eastern country save Persia surpasses them in strength and appearance.

== Regional adaptation of Arabic script ==
Ajami Script which employs Old Harari has been in use in Harar since the 17th century. The process of ajamisization loosely refers to the local languages of the region that have been written in Arabic script, a practice used to make Islam and the Quran more accessible to the Harari people. It is suggested by scholars to be an aesthetic choice in Quranic manuscript production, as there are no informational discrepancies between Arabic script Qurans and Ajami script Qurans.

== Harari Qurans between the Mamluk and the Mughal ==
Recent scholars have noted similarities between Indian, Mamluk, and Harari Qurans that are likely the result of material exchange and distribution of Quranic manuscripts via Red Sea and Indian Ocean trade routes. One of the foremost scholars on this subject, Sana Mirza has also pointed to the position of Yemen's manuscript traditions as a potential intermediary between these centers of manuscript production.

=== Bihari script ===
Bihari calligraphy, placed somewhere between angular and cursive scripts, was developed in the region of Bihar by the 14th century. Use of Bihari script declined towards the end of the 16th century, though manuscripts from the 18th into the 19th century have surfaced in more recent research. The script was used primarily when writing religious manuscripts. In pre-Mughal India, it was used almost exclusively in Quranic manuscripts.

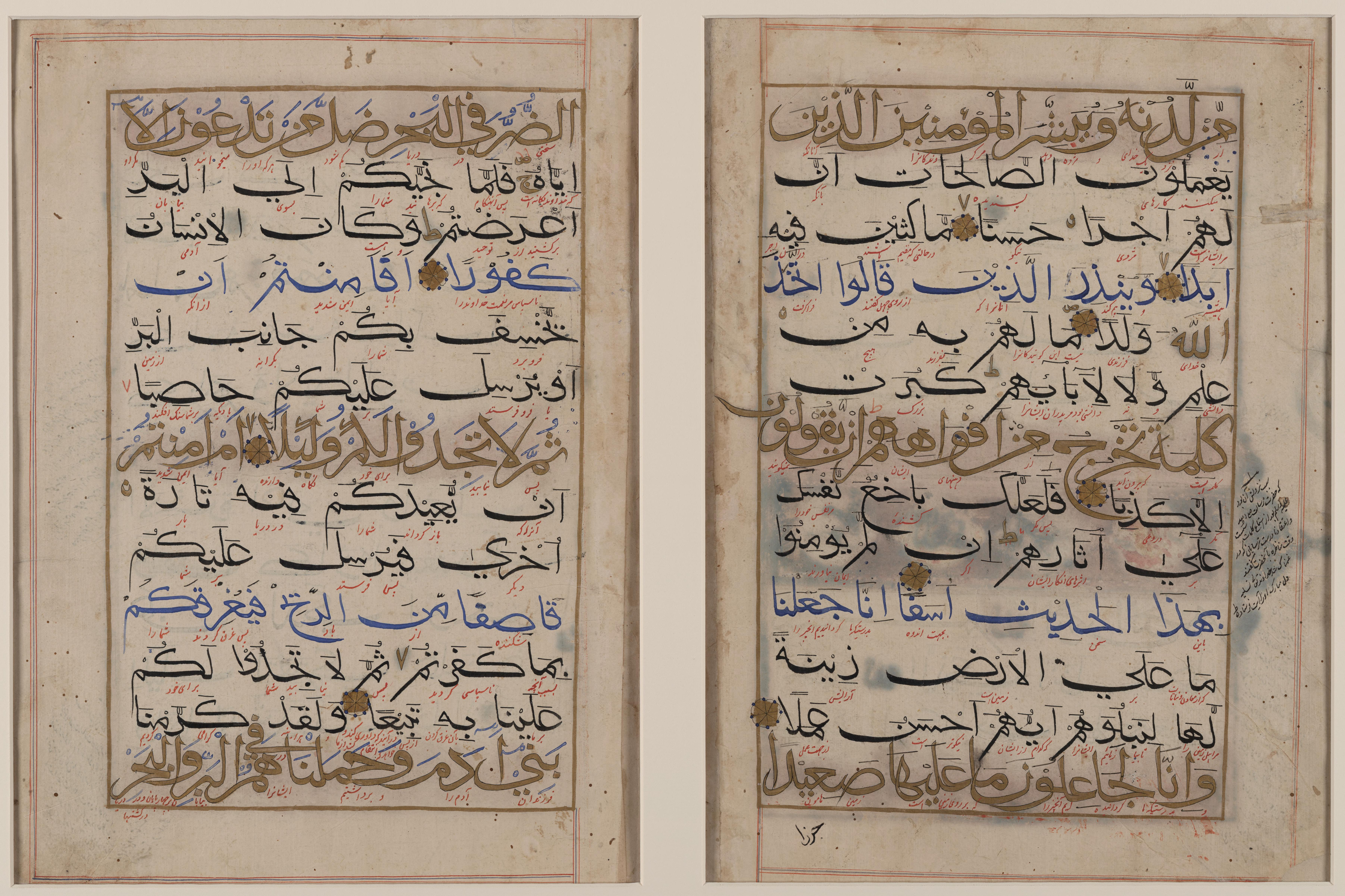
Folio from a Quran in Bihari script

Though not explicitly identified as Bihari script by scholars, variations on the script's characteristic thick, wedge-shaped horizontals, thin verticals and horizontal diacritics have been identified in Harari Quranic manuscripts including ones held in the Sharif Harar Museum, the Melikian collection, and the Khalili collection.

=== Zigzagging marginal glosses ===
Zigzagging marginal glosses—text added to Quranic manuscripts as interpretation of the surahs—are a characteristic of Indian Quranic manuscripts that have been similarly identified in Harari Qurans. These variant readings were typically written in a different script than the verses themselves, a less angular cursive script, nashi-diwani. The nashi-diwani script was developed in India during the Sultanate period and seems to have been derived from administrative texts. Though Mirza did not identify nashi-diwani use in her analysis of the Khalili Quran, she points to a comparable distinction between two separate scripts used in this folio's Quranic verse and marginal notes.

=== Relationship to Mamluk Qurans ===
The visual content of early Harari Quranic manuscripts and Qurans produced under the Mamluk Empire, which ruled modern-day Egypt, Syria, and Arabia from 1250 to 1517, is similar in their decorative chapter headings, concentric marginal medallions, and frontispiece formats. Similarities between 18th century Harari manuscripts have been known to utilize marginal ornament and decorated surah headings. Though the boom in Harari manuscript production is situated after this period, the preservation of Mamluk designs in Egyptian manuscripts as well as the distribution of manuscripts created during the Mamluk period may account for these stylistic similarities.

== Examples ==
=== Khalili Quran ===
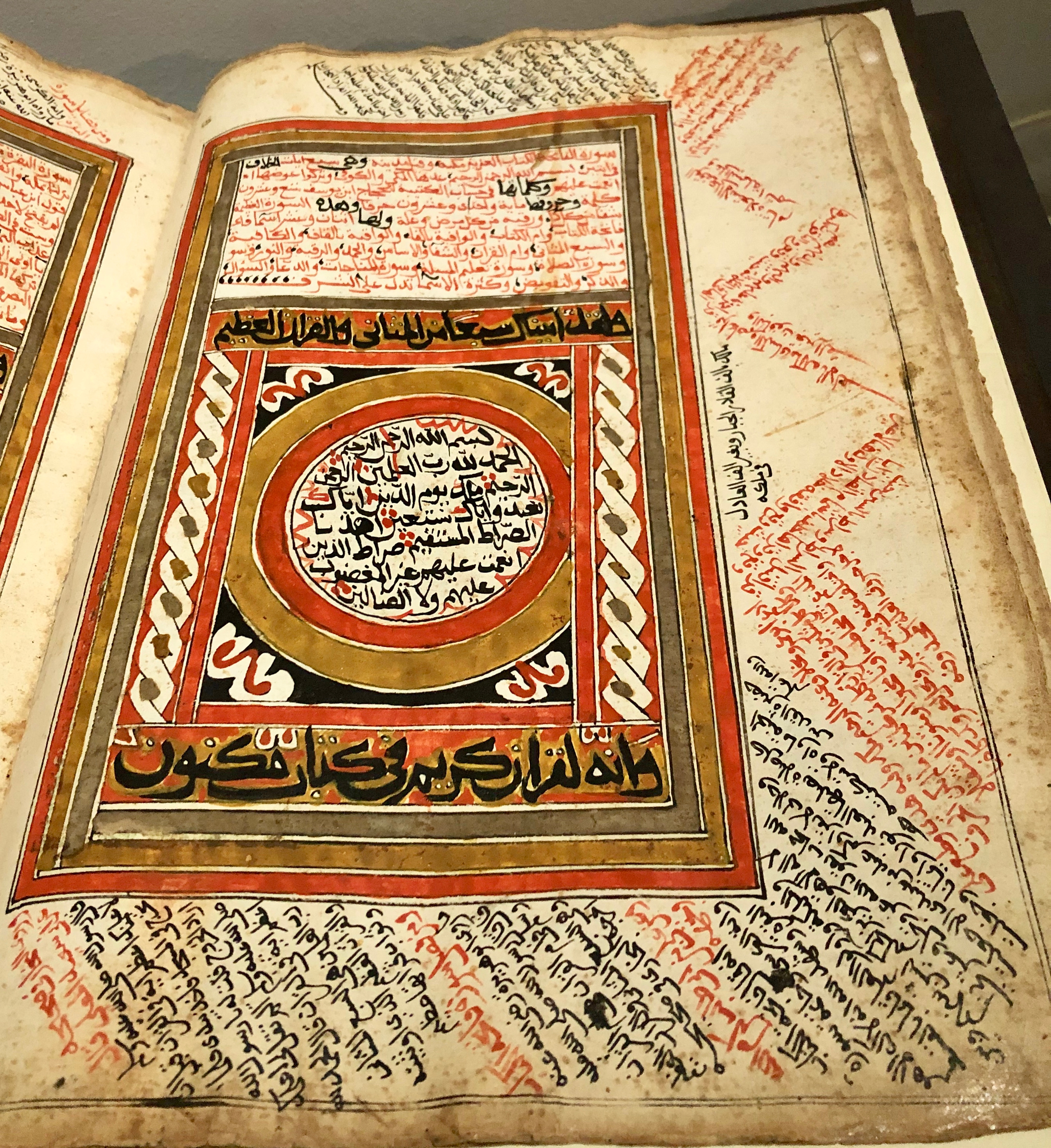
Quran with zigzagging marginal gloss from the Khalili Collection

The Khalili Quran is a single volume made up of 290 folios. Its colophon dates it to September or October 1749. Each page, measuring roughly 32.5 x 22.5 cm on European laid paper, contained 15 lines of Quranic text framed by a triple ruled border. The text itself is rendered in black ink, while the marginal glosses contained throughout that provide a reader with different readings of the book, have been written in red.

=== Melikian collection Quran ===
An Ethiopian Quran held in the Melikian Collection was recently exhibited at the Toledo Museum of Art's recent exhibition Ethiopia at the Crossroads. Made in 1773, this Quran manuscript uses a palette of primarily black and red ink; the red is used for the surah headings, marginal zigzagging commentary, margins, and the black used for the script and diacritics. Each page, roughly 32 x 21.5 cm contains 17 lines of Eastern Sudanese script.

== Exhibitions ==
Research on and display of Harari Qurans is limited. The 2017 exhibition The Art of the Qur’an was the first major exhibition in the US to showcase Islamic manuscripts, but it did not include any from Ethiopia. Other exhibits such as 2023's Africa & Byzantium included a variety of Ethiopian art and artifacts, but no Quranic manuscripts. It is only recently that Harari Qurans have begun to be displayed in major museum exhibitions such as Brigham Young University's Beauty and Belief, Aga Khan Museum's Hidden Stories, and the Walters Museum's Ethiopia at the Crossroads, which opened in December 2023, and has since been shown at the Peabody Essex Museum and the Toledo Museum of Art.

== See also ==
- Islam in Ethiopia
- Islam in Africa
- Harar
- Early Quranic manuscripts
- Old Harari
