= Jean-Louis Asselin de Cherville =

Jean-Louis Asselin de Cherville (1772 in Cherbourg – 1822 in Cairo) was a French Orientalist. He studied in Cherbourg and Valognes and was destined for priesthood, receiving his tonsure in 1792. He became a lecturer in the short-lived revolutionary École normale in the year III (1794), and was employed by the Republican ministry of treasure from 1795 to 1802, a post which he left in order to study oriental languages. He went to Cairo as translator in 1806, where he served as vice-consul (but was never promoted to consul because he refused to leave the mother of his children, a Ragusian laundrywoman, with whom he lived in concubinage). He moved to Alexandria in 1816 and ended his career in the position of first dragoman (official interpreter) of the French consulate for Egypt. He participated in the philological discovery of the South Semitic languages of Abyssinia, Amharic and Ge'ez. During his time in Egypt, he collected more than 1,500 manuscripts.

He also became an important part of the translation of the Bible into the Amharic language of Ethiopia. An Ethiopian cleric known as Abu Rumi was travelling through Cairo and became very ill. Asselin took him in, provided for him, and engaged him to translate the Bible into Amharic. He provided Abu Rumi with food, lodging, and medical care. But more significantly, he also provided Abu Rumi with writing materials and aided him with his knowledge of the original Biblical languages, Greek and Hebrew. Over a period of 10 years (1772-1822), Abu Rumi produced a complete translation of the Bible in Amharic. Asselin later sold the manuscript to William Jowett on behalf of the British and Foreign Bible Society.

After his death, the bulk of his manuscript collection was sold to the Bibliothèque royale in 1833, where Michele Amari was charged with curating the collection's early Quranic manuscripts, except for the manuscripts of the Amharic Bible, which had earlier been purchased by the British and Foreign Bible Society.

== See also ==
- Codex Parisino-petropolitanus
