= Hijazi script =

Early Arabic scripts

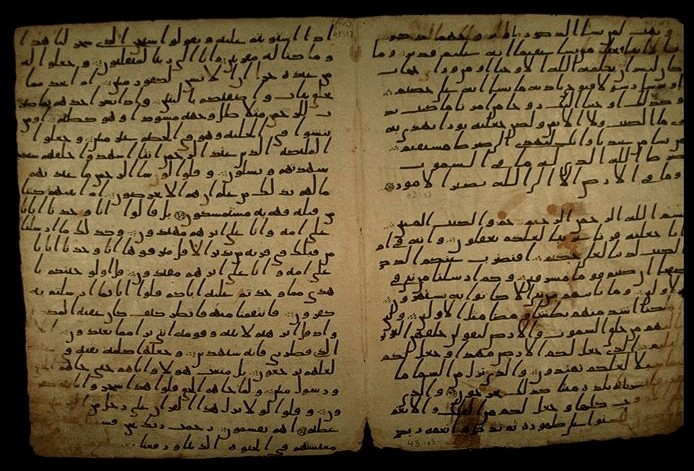
Sanaa manuscript: an early Quranic manuscript in Hijazi script (8th century AD)

Hijazi script (Arabic: خَطّ ٱَلحِجَازِيّ, romanized: khaṭṭ al-ḥijāzī) is an early Arabic script that developed in the Hejaz region of the Arabian Peninsula, including cities of Mecca and Medina, and was used in some of the earliest Qur'anic manuscripts. It was often shown in a sloping style called a Ma'il script (Arabic: مائل, romanized: māʾil, lit. 'sloping').

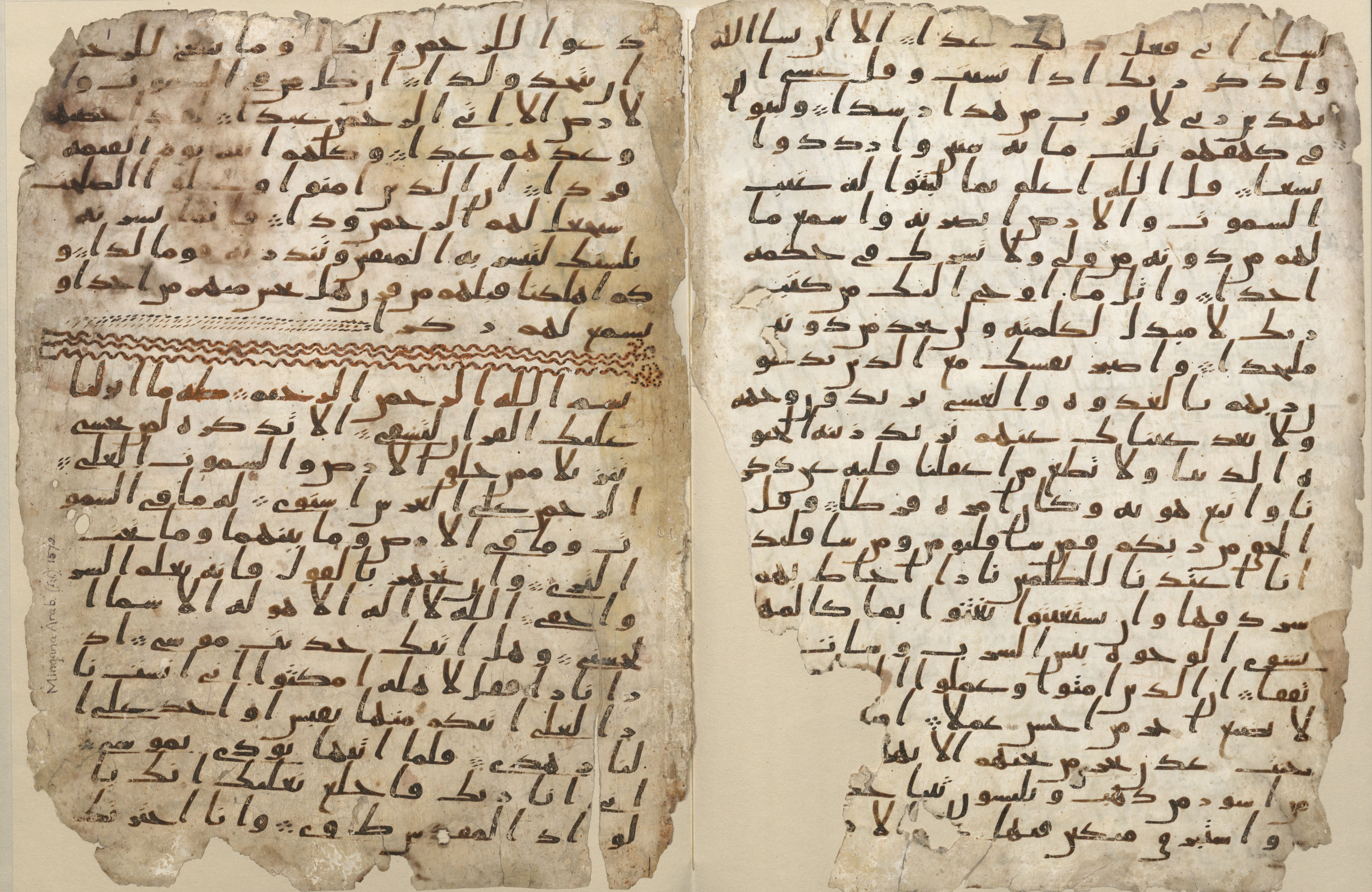
Birmingham Quran manuscript in Hijazi script

The script is notably angular in comparison with other Arabic scripts and tends to slope to the right. The script initially contained no dots or diacritical marks to indicate vowel sounds, though some included small red dots or short strokes to indicate vowels and mark verse divisions.

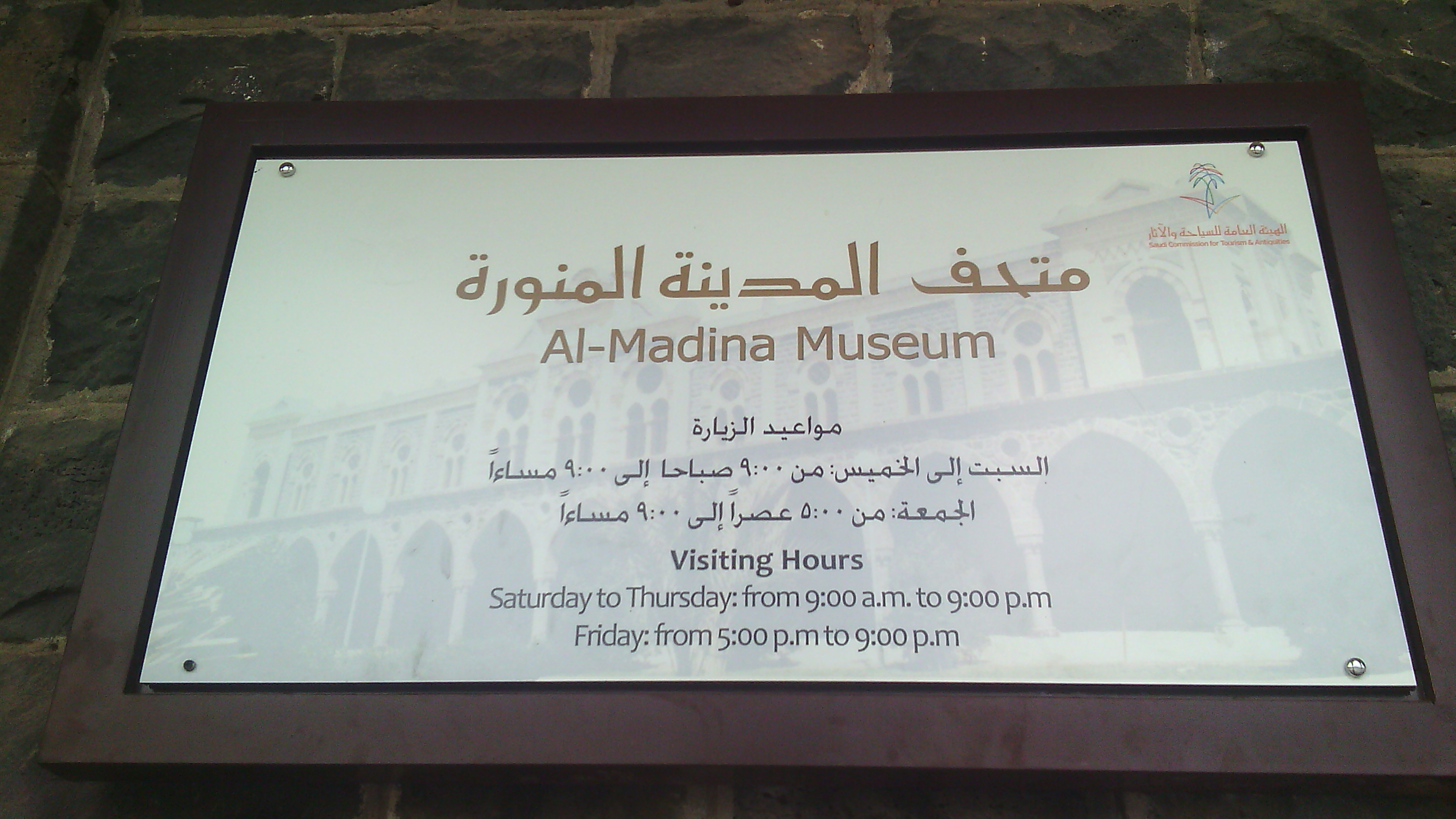
The Madani Script (Hijazi Script) is used in the official signs in Medina including its museums (as shown in the picture).

== History ==
Hijazi was one of the earliest Arabic scripts, alongside Mashq and Kufic. Even older scripts include Ancient North Arabian and South Arabian scripts. Ancient manuscripts are divided into two major types, Hijazi and Kufic. Kufic style also has its own subdivisions.

The term Hijazi was coined in the 19th century by Michele Amari, who distinguished between "Meccan script" and "Medinan script" from a 10th-century manuscript. Today, there is no solid evidence that these geographic labels are accurate.

The concept of Hijazi script has been criticized by Estelle Whelan, who sees this definition as a "scientific artefact" based on the form of a single letter (aleph) and archaic explanations. Since the 1980s, the Kufic script has been referred to by François Déroche as a preference, with the definition of an "ancient Abbasid script".

== Characteristics ==
The letters in Hijazi script were usually slanted to the right with simple curves and thin vertical lines. Some surviving Hijazi manuscripts show small features like red dots or diacritic marks for early vowel sounds and short strokes marking division. Scribes often used irregular spacing or letter shapes. Since diacritic marks and short vowels were only added to Qur'anic manuscripts at the end of the 8th century, we can presumably date Hijazi manuscripts to before that date.

An example of this is the Sanaa Palimpsest, which illustrates these features. This reflected the process of converting oral recitation into written text.

== Use in Early Qur'ans ==
As Hijazi script evolved, its style of writing used in some of the earliest Qur'anic manuscripts, dating back to the 8th century. Typically, these manuscripts were written on parchment and were minimal or few decorative elements, illustrating features of early Arabic writing.

The script was used to write and preserve the Qur'ans before the development of more formal scripts, like Kufic.

Hijazi script is believed to have evolved gradually, with scribes adjusting letter forms and spacing, paving the way for the later, more formal Kufic style. It serves as a transitional script between the early forms of writing and later more formal scripts like Kufic.

== See also ==
- Thuluth
- Naskh
- Tawqi
- Muhaqqaq
- Rayhan
- Arabic calligraphy
