= Marijn van Putten =

Dutch Historical linguist (born 1988)

- Marijn van Putten

Marijn van Putten (born March 10, 1988) is a Dutch historical linguist and assistant professor at Leiden University.

== Biography ==
Born on March 10, 1988, in Amsterdam, Marijn van Putten completed his diploma at Jan Tinbergen College in Roosendaal in 2006. He then pursued a bachelor's degree in Comparative Indo-European Linguistics at Leiden University, followed by a Research Master in Linguistics, focusing on language structure and variation. During this period, he developed an interest in Berber languages and their historical linguistics. In 2012, he began his PhD research on Awjila Berber grammar at the Leiden University Centre of Linguistics, completing his thesis within a year. He received his PhD from Leiden University in 2013. After his Research Master, he worked as a research assistant in the Comparative Indo-European Linguistics department, contributing to etymological dictionaries and the New Indo-European Dictionary Project.

== Works ==
- A Grammar of Awjila Berber (Libya): Based on Paradisi's Work (2014)
- Quranic Arabic: From its Hijazi Origins to its Classical Reading Traditions (2022)
- al-Dānī's al-Taysīr fī al-qirāʾāt al-sabʿ: A Translation with Linguistic Commentary (2026)
