= Topkapı manuscript =

Early Quranic manuscript

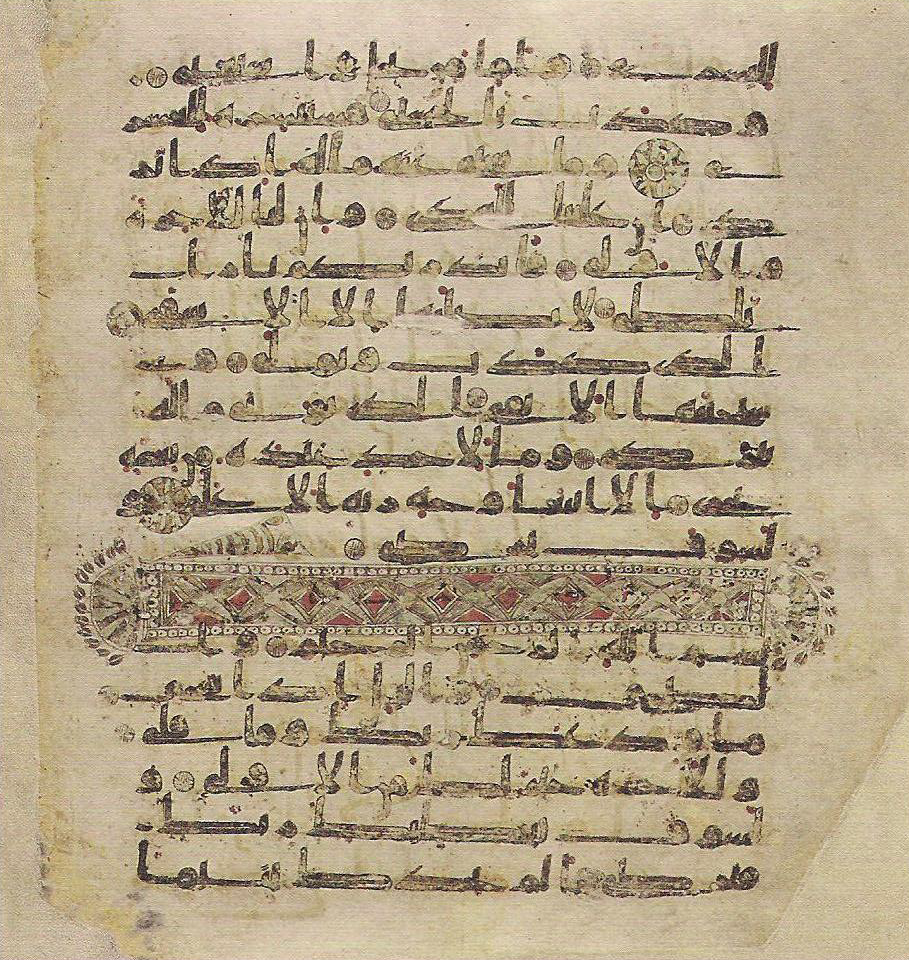
Page from the Topkapi manuscript with heading for the chapter Ad-Dhuha

The Topkapı manuscript or Topkapı Quran (Also known as Topkapı Qurʾān Manuscript H.S. 32 or Topkapı H.S. 32) is an early manuscript of the Quran dated to the middle 2nd century AH (mid 8th century AD).

This manuscript is kept in the Topkapi Palace Museum, Istanbul, Turkey. It is traditionally attributed to Uthman ibn Affan (d. 656). However, a recent study by Professor Rami Hussein Halaseh indicates that attributing H.S. 32 to "ʿUthmān or claiming its production during the first/seventh century is historically inaccurate."

Similar illuminations can be found in the Dome of the Rock in Jerusalem, the Umayyad Mosque in Damascus and other Umayyad monuments. The size of this manuscript is 41 cm × 46 cm (16 in × 18 in). According to Halaseh, H.S. 32 currently contains about 97.78% of the text of the Qur'ān. With only two pages (23 verses) lacking, this manuscript is the closest to the complete text of the Quran. Mehmed Ali Pasha, Governor of Egypt, sent this manuscript to the Ottoman Sultan Mahmud II as a gift in the 19th century (CE).

The paleographic assessment indicates that the Topkapi manuscript comes closest to those writings that date back to the 8th century. (cf. the examples in Déroche: Abbasid, page 36). Halaseh also shows that based on the paleography of the manuscript, folios 2r–6v and 11 seems to have been created by another hand and added to the manuscript at a much later stage.

According to Tayyar Altıkulaç, the manuscript dates to somewhere in the second half of the first century AH to the first half of the second century AH based on vowelling and dottings.

E. İhsanoǧlu has written, "An examination of the Topkapı Muṣḥaf shows that it was written with a developed kufic script. The shape of the letters does not confirm to the writing style of the early Muṣḥafs attributed to Caliph ʿUthmān, which were written on vellum in his period and therefore known as the Muṣḥafs of Caliph ʿUthmān. (...) Apparently this Method of Abū al-Aswad al-Duʾalī [invented after the death of Caliph ʿUthmān] was carefully followed in placing the vowel marks of the Topkapi Palace copy. Single dots were placed in red ink above, beside or below the letters." (Altıkulaç, al-Muṣḥāf al-Sharif (Preface), page 9).

"According to the evaluation of Munadjdjid, neither this Muṣḥaf nor the Muṣḥafs located in Tashkent, al-Mashhad al-Ḥusayn in Cairo and in the Museum of Turkish and Islamic Works in Istanbul were the Muṣḥafs attributed to Caliph ʿUthmān; however considering the differences in their script, the centuries when they were copied and their different dimensions, they must have been copied from the Muṣḥafs attributed to Caliph ʿUthmān. For this reason, each of them was called the (Muṣḥaf ʿUthmān)" (Altıkulaç, al-Muṣḥaf al-Sharif, page 80).
