= François Déroche =

French orientalist

- Born: October 24, 1952 (age 73); Metz, France

Academic background
- Education: École Normale Supérieure
- Thesis: Recherches sur l'oasis de dedan al-ula (1987)
- Doctoral advisor: Dominique Sourdel

Academic work
- Discipline: Orientalist

François Déroche (born October 24, 1952) is an academic and specialist in Codicology and Palaeography, especially in relation to Quranic studies. He is a professor at the Collège de France, where he is holding "History of the Quran Text and Transmission" Chair.

== Biography ==
Déroche was born on 24 October 1952 in Metz. After completing his Classe préparatoire at Lycée Henri-IV, he began his studies at the École Normale Supérieure in 1973. He got the Agrégation de Lettres classiques in 1976 and passed the Diplôme d'études approfondies in Egyptology in 1978. After a year of aggrégation internship, he was recruited in 1979 by the Bibliothèque nationale de France as a scientific resident, responsible for preparing the catalog of manuscripts of the Quran. In 1983 he was appointed a scientific resident at the French Institute of Anatolian Studies in Istanbul for a period of three years, he will remain in this city two additional years thanks to a grant from the Fondation Max van Berchem (Geneva). During his stay in Istanbul, he completed his doctoral thesis on the oasis of Dedan/al-'Ulâ that he defended in 1987. On his return to France in 1988, he was assigned to secondary education, first in the Paris region, then to Auneau and Châteauneuf-en-Thymerais. In 1990, he was elected director of studies at the Section of Historical and Philological Sciences at the École pratique des hautes études.

He was a vice-president, then a president of the Society for the Study of Prehistoric, Ancient and Medieval Maghreb, he directs the organization of study days in collaboration with the Académie des Inscriptions et Belles-Lettres, where he was elected as a correspondent on October 26, 2000, and a member on January 28, 2011; he is also involved in the preparation of the academic seminars of this society, in Tripoli (2005), Caen (2009) and Aix and Marseille (2014).

He is a member of many learned societies, including the Société Asiatique, the Comité des travaux historiques et scientifiques, and the Board of Experts of the Al-Furqan Islamic Heritage Foundation in London. He is a member of the Board of Directors and Scientific Council of the École Pratique des Hautes Études.

== Awards and honours ==
- 1988: CNRS Bronze Medal
- 2008: Chevalier of the Legion of Honor
- 2009: Commander of the Ordre des Palmes Académiques

== Works ==
- Catalogue des manuscrits arabes, fascicules 1 et 2, Bibliothèque nationale (France), département des manuscrits, Bibliothèque nationale.
- 1989 - Manuscrits Moyen-Orient Essais de Codicologie et Paléographie, actes du colloque d’Istanbul, 26-29 mai 1986, Institut français d’études anatoliennes : Bibliothèque nationale.
- Déroche, François (1992). The Abbasid Tradition: Qur ̓ans of the 8th to 10th Centuries. Nasser D. Khalili Collection of Islamic Art. London. ISBN 0197276008.
- Les manuscrits du Coran en caractères higâzî: Position du problème et éléments préliminaires pour une enquête. Lesa. 1996.
- Scribes et manuscrits du Moyen-Orient, Bibliothèque nationale de France. 1997.
- Manuel de codicologie des manuscrits en écriture arabe. Bibliothèque nationale de France. 2000.
  - Waley, Muhammad Isa, ed. (2006). Islamic Codicology: An Introduction to the Study of Manuscripts in Arabic Script. Translated by Dusinberre, Deke; Radzinowicz, David. London: Al-Furqan Islamic Heritage Foundation.
- Le Livre manuscrit arabe: Préludes à une histoire. Paris. 2004.
- Le Coran. Que sais-je?. PUF. 2005.
- La transmission écrite du Coran dans les débuts de l'islam, le Codex Parisino-Petropolitaminus. Leiden-Boston: Brill. 2009. ISBN 9789004172722.
- Qur'ans of the Umayyads: A First Overview. Brill. 2014. ISBN 978-90-04-26185-3.
- La voix et le calame. Collège de France. Fayard. 2016.
- Le Coran, une histoire plurielle Essai sur la formation du texte coranique. Éditions du Seuil. 2019.
- The Quran of Historians
