= Isfahan Quran =

10th-century manuscript of the Quran

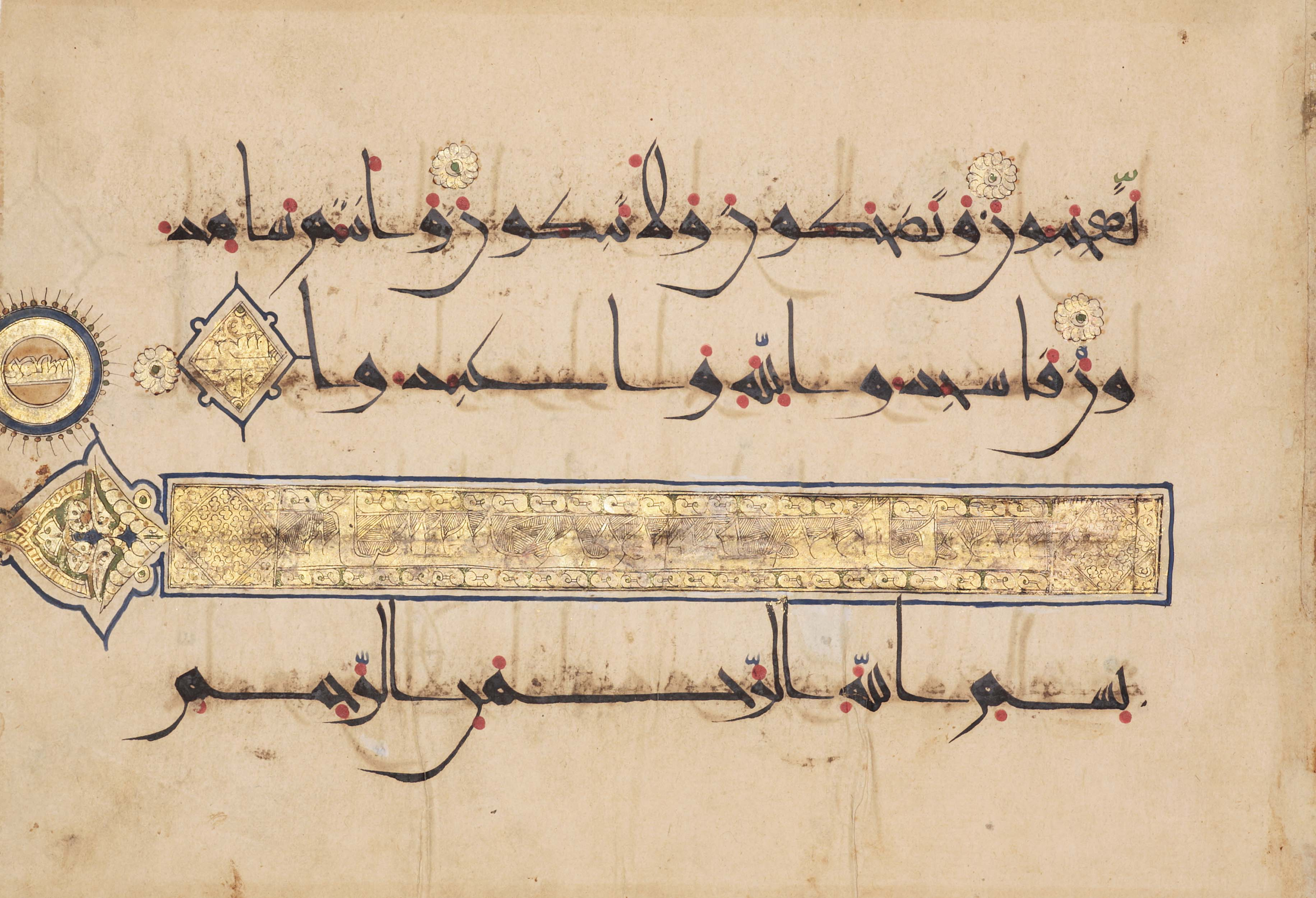
Folio from the Khalili Collection of Islamic Art with surah heading in gold

The Isfahan Quran (Persian: قرآن اصفهان, romanized: Gharan Esfehan) is an early manuscript of the Quran written in Isfahan in AH 383 (993 CE). It is now dispersed between multiple collections, with folios in the Turkish and Islamic Arts Museum in Istanbul, the Metropolitan Museum of Art, the Khalili Collection of Islamic Art, the Freer Gallery of Art, and the Minneapolis Institute of Art. Its format and calligraphy have features that were new in the tenth century: paper rather than parchment, a more ornate form of script, and the use of coloured ink markings.

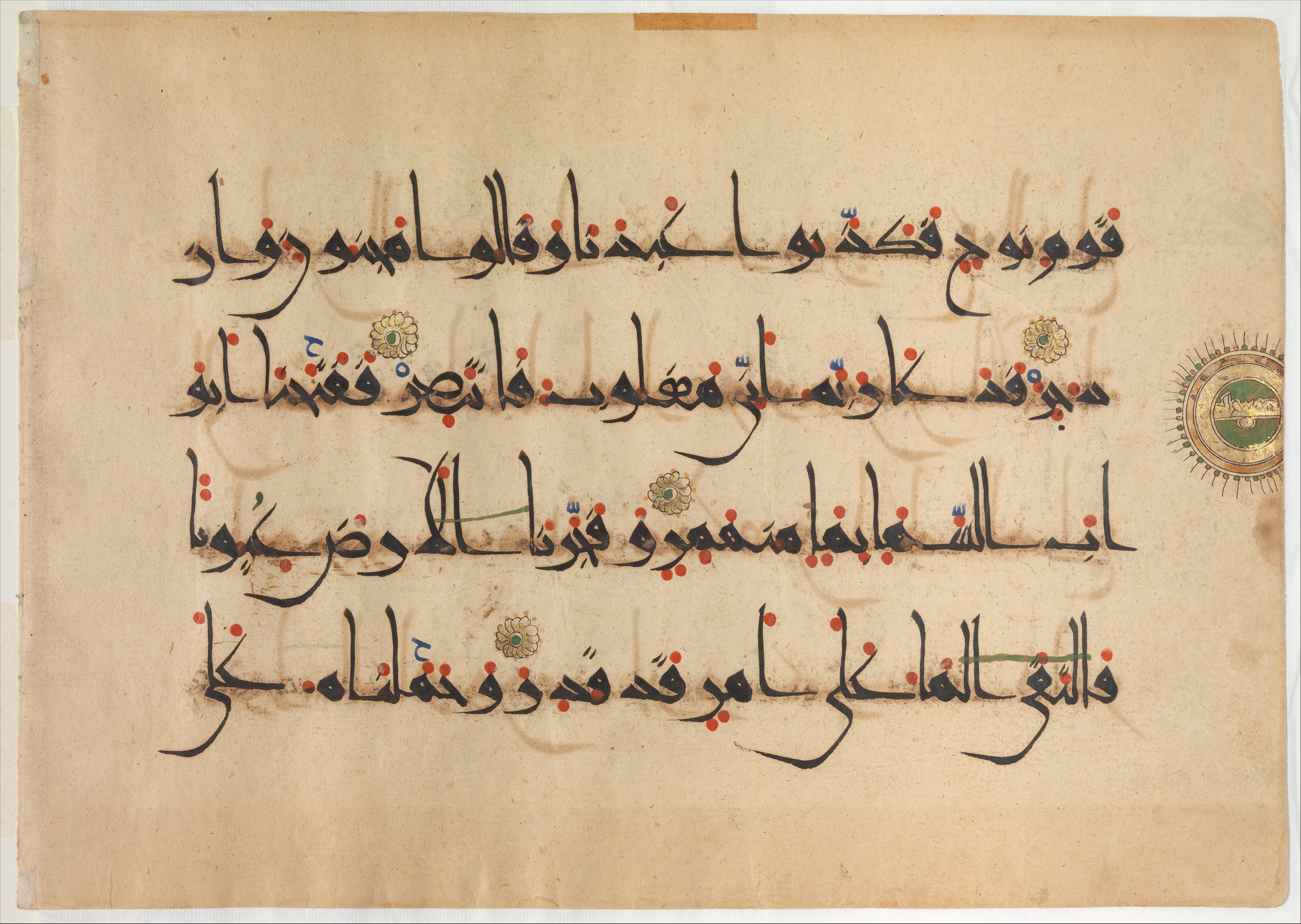
Folio from the Metropolitan Museum of Art

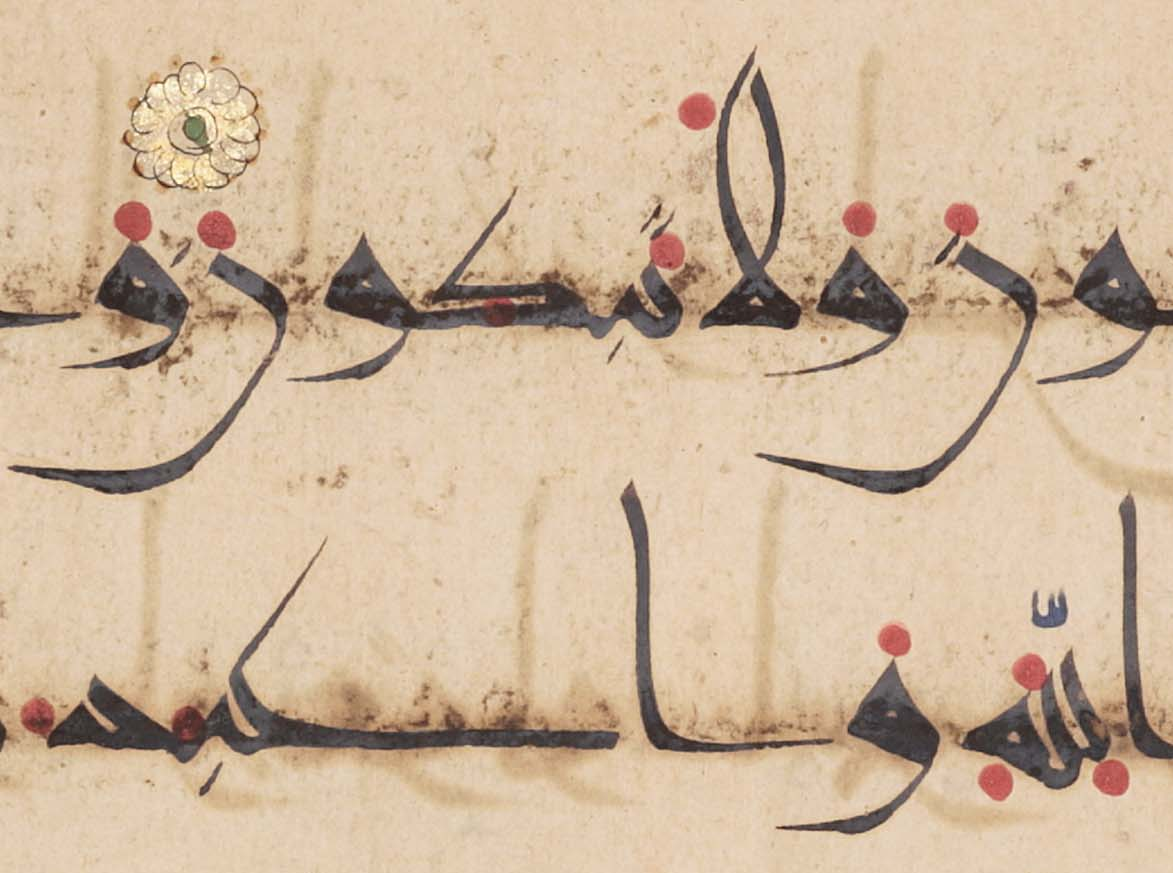
Close-up view showing the varying stroke widths, red dots for vocalisation, and (top left) a verse marker in gold and ink

== Physical description ==
The original manuscript consisted of 1,300 folios in four volumes. The folios are made of paper and measure 34 or 35 centimetres (13 or 14 in) by 21 to 24 centimetres (8 to 9 in). The combination of paper and horizontal format is uncommon; early manuscript Qurans were usually on parchment and in a horizontal format, while in later centuries paper and the vertical format became the norm.

The text is set out in four lines of Kufic script written in black ink. There are coloured dots for vocalisation markings and gold for decoration, including surah headings and verse markers. The manuscript is signed by the scribe, Muhammad ibn Ahmad ibn Yasln.

== Location ==
The collections and inventory numbers for currently known parts of the Isfahan Quran are:

- Turkish and Islamic Arts Museum, 453–456
- Khalili Collection of Islamic Art, single folio with the end of An-Najm and start of Al-Qamar, KFQ 90
- Metropolitan Museum of Art, bifolio with discontinuous parts of Al-Qamar, 40.164.5
- Minneapolis Institute of Art, single folio with part of Al-Qamar, 51.37.7
- Freer Gallery of Art, single folio with the end of Al-Qamar and start of Ar-Rahman, F1937.34

== Significance ==
The Isfahan Quran is an example of what François Déroche called the "new style" of Kufic script, a strongly angular style with varying line thicknesses and some elongated letters. This script style, also known as "broken Kufic", rose to popularity in the tenth century. This Quran is unusual in the vertical height given to each row of text, at around 4 centimetres (1.6 in). The variety of letter sizes and brush strokes, within the four consistently spaced lines, required particularly skilled use of the qalam, the reed pen used in Islamic calligraphy. The use of dots in multiple colours to indicate in detail how the text is to be vocalised is also a tenth-century innovation.
