= J. M. Rogers =

British historian of Islamic art (1935–2022)

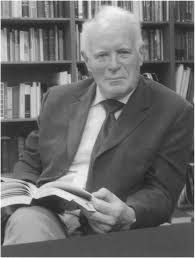
Photo of John Michael Rogers

John Michael Rogers, FBA, FSA (25 January 1935 – 25 December 2022) was a British art historian who was an expert in Islamic art history. He was Khalili Professor Emeritus of Islamic Art at SOAS, University of London from 1991 and a published author. In his later years, he was Honorary Curator of the Nasser D. Khalili Collection of Islamic Art.

== Life and career ==
John Michael Rogers was born at a maternity home in Barrow-in-Furness, Cumberland, England on 25 January 1935. He studied Philosophy, Politics and Economics (PPE) at Corpus Christi College, Oxford (1958). National Service followed—initially in the Royal Artillery and latterly the Intelligence Corps, where he was commissioned and trained as a Russianist. After National Service he continued to briefly serve in the Territorial Army (Reserves), but returned to Academia and a research fellowship in philosophy at Oriel College; he latterly taught philosophy at Pembroke College and Wadham College. As his interests shifted from philosophy to Islamic art, he learned Turkish, and earned a PhD on the architectural patronage of Seljuq Anatolia under Samuel Stern and Victor Ménage.

He taught Islamic art at the American University in Cairo, 1965–1977. In 1977 he joined the British Museum, as a curator in the Department of Oriental Antiquities, where he organized several exhibitions including "Islamic Art and Design" (1983), and "Suleyman the Magnificent" (1988). He was also responsible for the installation of the Islamic collections in the John Addis Gallery in 1989.

From 1991 to 2000, Rogers was the Nasser D. Khalili Professor of Islamic Art and Archaeology at SOAS, University of London. From 1992, he was Honorary Curator of the Nasser D. Khalili Collection of Islamic Art, the world’s largest collection of Islamic art and antiquities in private hands. He was a Member of Council at the British Academy, 1992–1995.

Rogers never married. He died from cancer at his flat in Camden, London, on 25 December 2022, aged 87.

== Honours ==
- 1972 Elected as a Fellow of the Society of Antiquaries.
- 1988 Elected as a Fellow of the British Academy.

== Selected publications ==
For a fuller bibliography, 1965–2004, see Essays in Honor of J.M. Rogers, ed. by Gülru Necipoğlu, Doris Behrens-Abouseif and Anna Contadinia (Brill, 2004)

- The Spread of Islam
- Islamic Art and Design 1500-1700 (1983)
- Suleyman the Magnificent (1988)
- Sinan (Makers of Islamic Civilisation Series, I.B. Tauris)
- Mughal Miniatures (1993)
- Rogers, J. M. (1995). Empire of the Sultans: Ottoman Art from the Collection of Nasser D. Khalili. Geneva: Musée d'art et d'histoire. ISBN 2-8306-0120-3. OCLC 34380041.
- Mughal Miniatures (2006)
- Rogers, J. M. (2008). The Arts of Islam: Treasures from the Nasser D. Khalili Collection. Abu Dhabi. OCLC 1008337672.

A special publication was prepared in his honour in 2004: Essays in Honor of J.M. Rogers, ed. by Gülru Necipoğlu, Doris Behrens-Abouseif and Anna Contadinia (Brill, 2004)
