= Kuran =

Kuran or Kooran may refer to:

== Places ==
=== Iran ===
- Kuran, East Azerbaijan, Iran
- Kuran, Bandar Abbas, Hormozgan Province, Iran
- Kuran, Bastak, Hormozgan Province, Iran
- Kooran, Baft, Kerman Province, Iran
- Kuran, Ravar, Kerman Province, Iran
- Kooran, Sirjan, Kerman Province, Iran
- Kuran, Sirjan, Kerman Province, Iran
- Kuran, North Khorasan, Iran
- Kuran-e Olya, Sistan and Baluchestan Province, Iran
- Kuran-e Sofla, Sistan and Baluchestan Province, Iran
- Kuran, Mahabad, West Azerbaijan Province, Iran
- Kuran, Urmia, West Azerbaijan Province, Iran
- Kuran-e Kordiyeh, Iran
- Kuran-e Torkiyeh, Iran

=== Elsewhere ===
- Kuran, Poland
- Kuran Islands, Western New Guinea, Indonesia

== Other uses ==
- Kooran (film), 2025 Indian film
- Kuran (surname)

== See also ==
- Quran (disambiguation), the central religious text of Islam
- Khuran (disambiguation)
- Kurana (disambiguation)
