= Khuran =

Khuran or Khvoran (Persian: خوران) may refer to these places in Iran:

- Khvoran, in Alborz Province
- Khuran-e Olya, in Ilam Province
- Khuran-e Sofla, in Ilam Province
- Khvoran, Kermanshah
- Clarence Strait (Iran)

== See also ==
- Kuran (disambiguation)
- Khurana (disambiguation)
