= Kurana =

Kurana may refer to:

- Kurana, Sri Lanka, a village in Sri Lanka
- Kurana, Uttar Pradesh, a village in India
- Kurana, Bhopal, a village in India

== See also ==
- Kuran (disambiguation)
