= Quran (disambiguation) =

The Quran is the Holy Book of Allah in Islam.

Quran or Qurʾan or Qurʾān may also refer to:

- Algeria Quran, an Algerian Mus'haf of the Quran
- Ali Quran, a Mus'haf manuscript of the Quran
- Birmingham Quran manuscript, a Mus'haf manuscript of the Quran
- Blood Quran, a Mus'haf manuscript of the Quran
- Blue Quran, a Mus'haf manuscript of the Quran
- Challenge of the Quran, a challenge proposed in the Quran
- Codex Parisino-petropolitanus Quran, a Mus'haf manuscript of the Quran
- Criticism of the Quran, an area of study on the content of the Quran
- Early Quranic manuscripts, Mus'haf manuscripts of the Quran
- Encyclopaedia of the Qurʾān, an encyclopedia dedicated to Quranic Studies
- History of the Quran, a timeline and origin of Quran
- Human rights in the Quran, rights bestowed upon humans in the Quran
- List of chapters in the Quran, a division of Quran content
- List of characters and names mentioned in the Quran, an enumeration of specific words in the Quran text
- List of tafsir works, Tafsir is a body of commentary and explication, aimed to exegesis of the Qur'an
- Miniature Quran, a tiny-written Quran
- Muhammad in the Quran, an enumeration of Muhammad in the Quran text
- Prostration of Quran recitation, a Quran recitation ritual in Islam
- Quran and miracles, concepts related to the verses of the Quran
- Quran translations, interpretations of the scripture of Islam in languages other than Arabic
- Samarkand Kufic Quran, a Mus'haf manuscript of the Quran
- Sanaa Quran, a Mus'haf manuscript of the Quran
- Thaalibia Quran, an Algerian Mus'haf of the Quran
- Timurid Quran manuscript, a Mus'haf manuscript of the Quran
- Topkapi Quran, a Mus'haf manuscript of the Quran
- Uthman Taha Quran, a modern Mus'haf of the Quran
- Women in the Quran, female characters and subjects in the Quran text

== See also ==
- Kuran (disambiguation)
- Qiraat, recitation method for the Quran
