= Culture of the Umayyad Caliphate =

Umayyad Caliphate

The Umayyad Mosque in Damascus, Syria. Completed 715 AD.

As the second established caliphate, following the early Muslim conquests beginning in 622 CE, the Umayyads captured and occupied the former Byzantine and Sasanian Empires, from the Iberian Peninsula in the west to Transoxiana and Sindh in the east until 750 CE (its offshoot persisted in Spain until 1031 CE) This initial period was catalyzed after the death of the Islamic prophet Muhammad, and marked the formative years of Islamic art and Islamic architecture.

== Umayyad Visual Culture ==
The conversation between Islamic art and other monotheistic religions, such as Judaism and Christianity, that co-existed alongside Muslim rule during the Middle Ages, can be depicted through decorative compositions. These can range from the display of geometric arrangements to figural imagery in specific contexts. For example,

classical forms and media that had fallen into abeyance in preceding centuries…orthogonal planning, large-scale stone sculptures, and even the adoption of the external form of the Roman fort…as the basic model for the Umayyad qasr.

This made Islamic art distinctive, and the longevity of these forms of architecture was significantly better than ones of a portable nature. For example, permanent artistic features within palatial residences included mosaics and friezes of intricate iconography. 'Senmurvs' were an example of carvings - metamorphic forms that emerged during the Sasanian period (between the third and seventh centuries); produced and inspired by mythology, such as griffins.

Greco-Roman influences were also littered among Umayyad stucco scenes, such as fruit-bearing vine scrolls and floral depictions that would have symbolised ‘supernatural fertility of paradise’. Furthermore, acanthus-like scrolls of greenery can also be seen in the sculpture of the ancient Roman Ara Pacis, that inspired Islamic motifs and stylistic constructions.

Similarly, these designs also featured on the Dome of The Rock in Jerusalem, which was also erected in the early eighth century. This site also reflects the importance of Syria and its Abrahamic associations to the Umayyad Caliphate based in Damascus. It could be considered a patronage of monumental architecture, containing such ornate materials that continue a tradition of the Late Antiquity, but reconfigured in interesting and innovative ways.

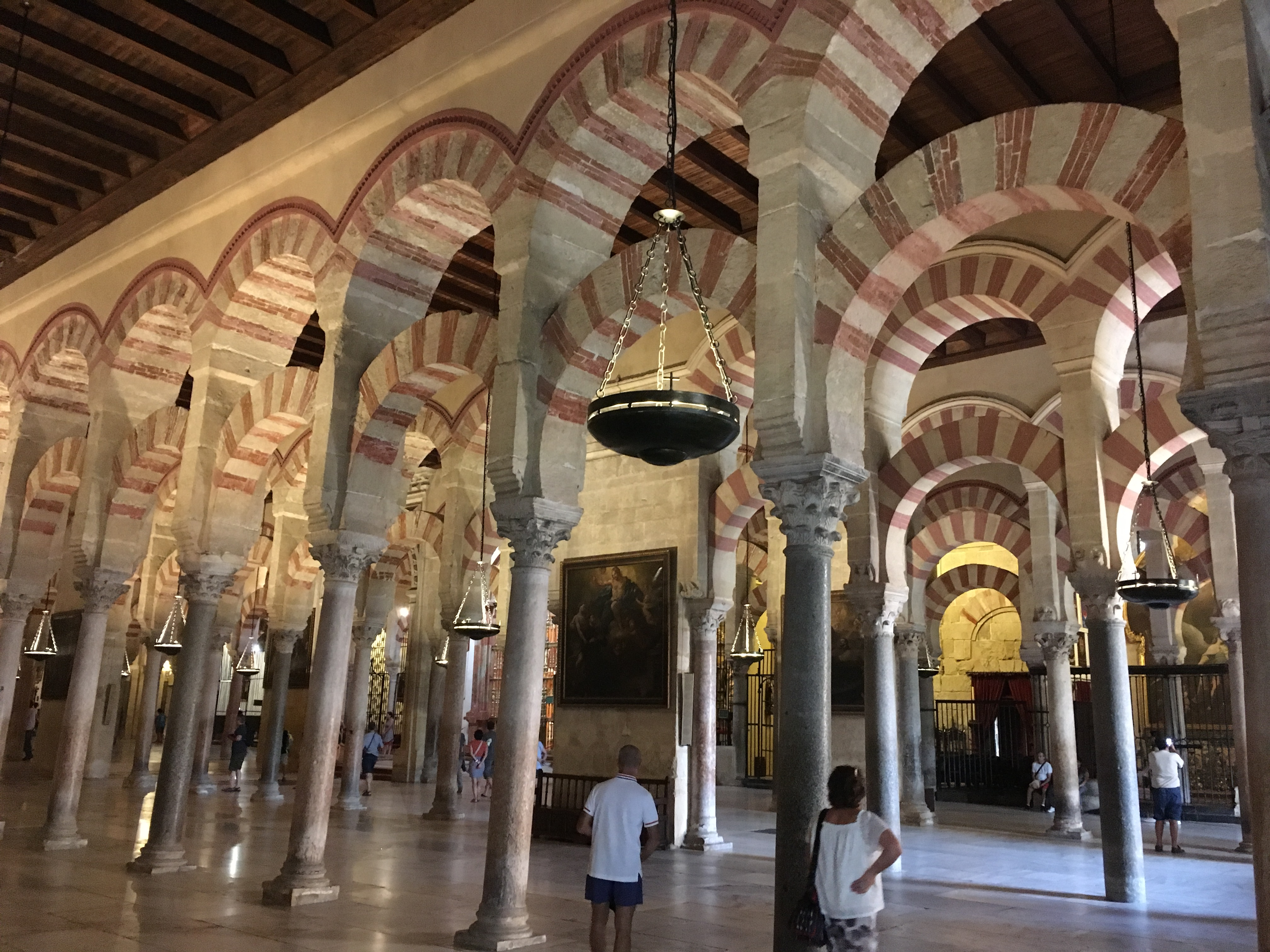
The Great Mosque of Cordoba, completed 785 AD. Islamic community of Al-Andalus. Later renamed the Cathedral of Cordoba.

Similarly, the mihrab and the dome above the Great Mosque of Cordoba was decorated in blue, green and gold mosaics, that posed somewhat of a rival to the Great Mosque in western culture.

Alternatively, supplemented by formal modes of development by the Byzantines and Sassanians, metalwork, textiles, depiction of animal, vegetal and figural motifs were influenced by late antiquity and naturalistic tradition, which had been prevalent from the eastern Mediterranean.

Despite this, coinage is the best evidence to depict a visual identity of the Umayyads of Syria, with bronze examples being found at Qasr al-Mshatta in Palestine after their minting had begun in 719-20 CE.

== Significance of Umayyad Art ==
Arguably, as one of the driving forces in establishing Umayyad rule, compositions in this period of the Late Antiquity 'were the earliest expressions of Islamic art on a grand scale’. Not only did the early Umayyad caliphs establish a distinctive, stylistic trend that identified their emerging culture to support the spread of Islam, but further used this to form a web of alliances with alternative kingdoms that once occupied the fringes of the Mediterranean.

From Umayyad art, it is visible to see the adoption and development of techniques and styles in the later Abbasid art, such as the 'Samarian Dancers' wall painting.

Umayyad art can be attributed with starting the confluence of ‘eastern’ and ‘western’ art which continued to develop in the Caliphate. This viewpoint is consistently popular as they did not appear to conform to a fixed artistic binary, thereby applying a more 'holistic' approach to the study of Umayyad architecture.
