= Khurana =

Khurana may refer to:

- Khurana, an Indian surname
- Khurana, a village in Punjab, India
- Inspector Khurana, a fictional character played by Iftekhar in the classic 1975 Indian film Sholay
- Luv Shuv Tey Chicken Khurana, a 2012 Indian film

== See also ==
- Khuran (disambiguation)
