= Kuran (surname) =

Kuran is a surname. Notable people with the surname include:

- Aptullah Kuran (1927–2002), Turkish architectural historian
- Juraj Kuráň (born 1988), Slovak footballer
- Timur Kuran (born 1954), Turkish American economist

== See also ==
- Kuroń
