= Abbasid art =

Arts of the Abbasid Caliphate from 750 to 10th century

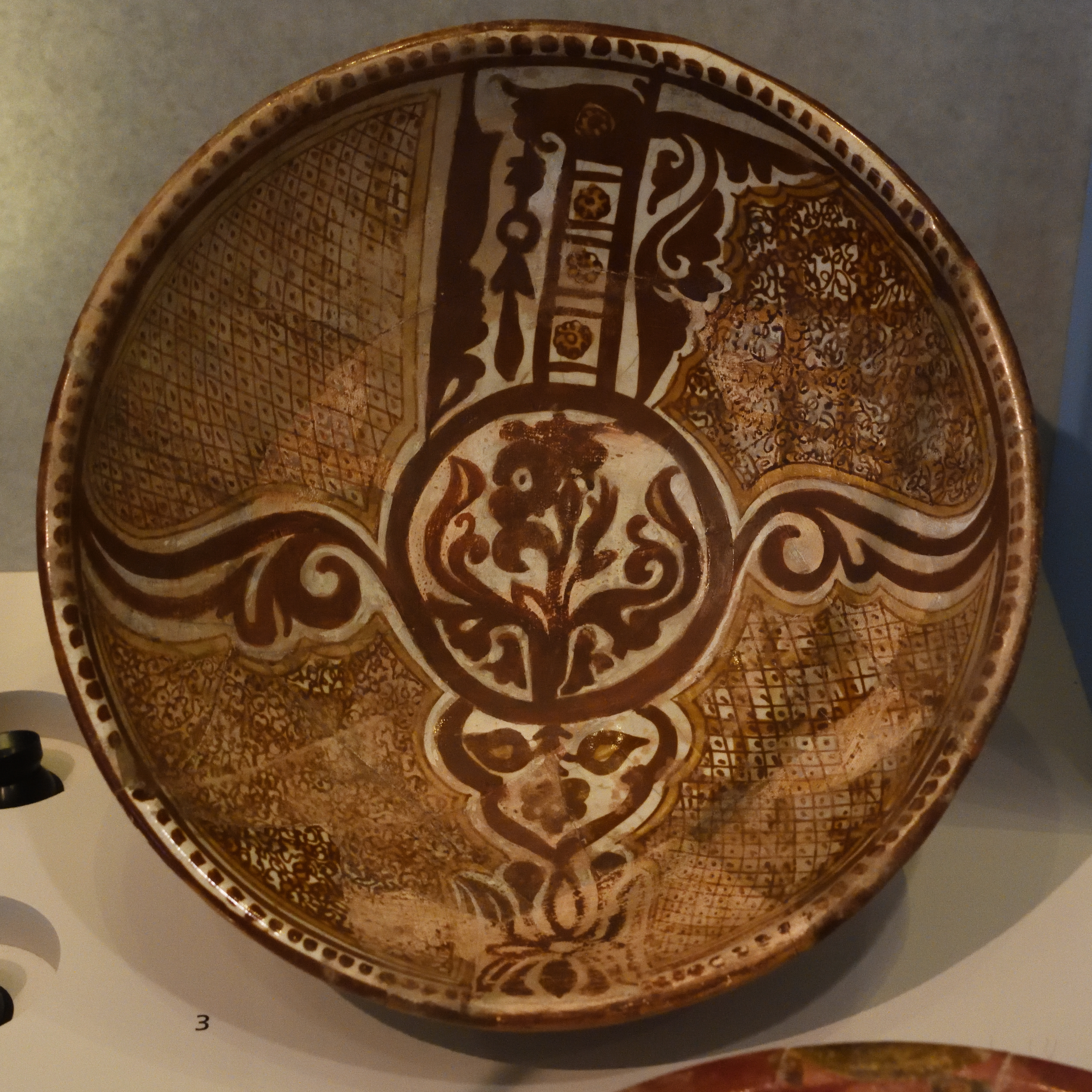
Bowl with polychrome lustre from 9th-century Iraq. Lustreware was a costly and sophisticated innovation of ceramic production during the Abbasid period. The bird motif here is so stylized as to be almost abstract, which is a trend also typical of Abbasid design.

The arts of the Abbasid Caliphate included fabrication of ceramics, textiles, glassware, and decorated manuscripts. Ceramics became one of the most important art forms and the invention of lustreware in this industry was a major innovation that influenced ceramic art throughout the region. This technique likely originated in glassware, which also became a more significant industry. Another major art form was calligraphy, with variations of Kufic being the main early style of script, along with the production of Qur'an manuscripts. An important textile industry existed, notably in the production of inscribed tiraz pieces. While metalwork of gold and silver has rarely survived, some silver dishes from Iran show derivations from Sasanian types, while bronze and copper alloy pieces of different types have also been found. Painting and stucco were important forms of decoration in Abbasid architecture.

== Background ==
Unlike the Umayyads, who were based in Syria, the Abbasid dynasty established their base of power in Iraq. This move to the east resulted in a cultural and artistic development influenced not only by Mediterranean and Middle Eastern traditions but also by connections further afield with India, Central Asia, and China. Abbasid political and cultural influence was at its height primarily between 750 and 932 CE, after which they lost political power to other dynasties. During this heyday, the Abbasid capital of Baghdad became the most important metropolis of the Islamic world and the authority of the Abbasid caliphs was recognized from Central Asia to the western Mediterranean. Accordingly, their influence on culture was felt far abroad.

== Painting ==
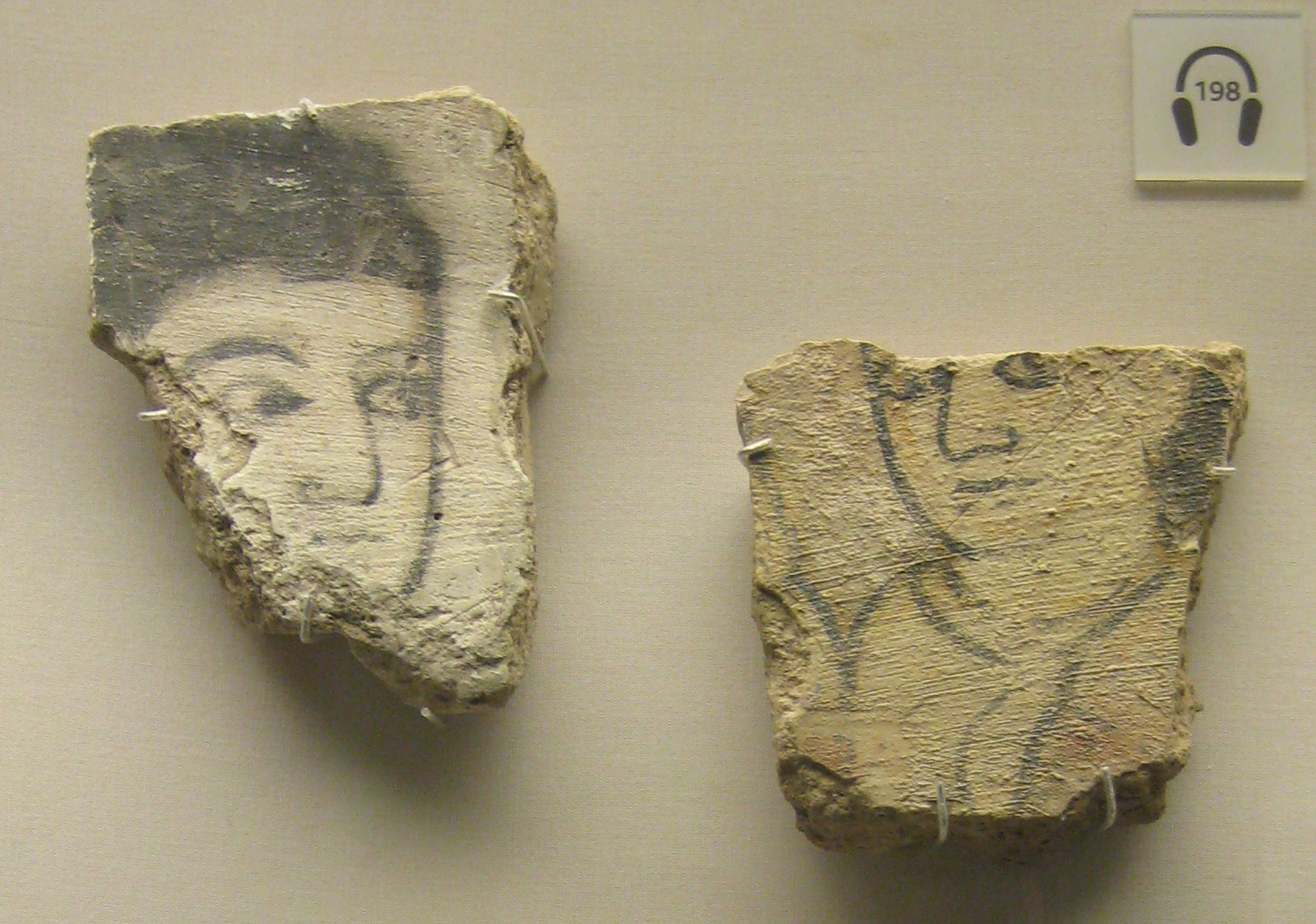
9th-century harem wall painting fragments found in Samarra

Early Abbasid painting has not survived in great quantities, and is sometimes harder to differentiate; however, Samarra provides good examples, as it was built by the Abbasids and abandoned 56 years later. The walls of the principal rooms of the palace that have been excavated show wall paintings and lively carved stucco dadoes. The earlier style is obviously adopted with little variation from Sassanian art, with similar styles, with harems, animals, dancing people, and garments, all enclosed in scrollwork. Nishapur had its own school of painting. Excavations at Nishapur show both monochromatic and polychromatic artwork from the 8th and 9th centuries. One famous piece of art consists of hunting nobles with falcons and on horseback, in full regalia; the clothing identifies them as Tahirid, a dynasty of vassals under the Abbasids. Other styles are of vegetation, and fruit in nice colors on a four-foot high dado.

== Ceramics ==
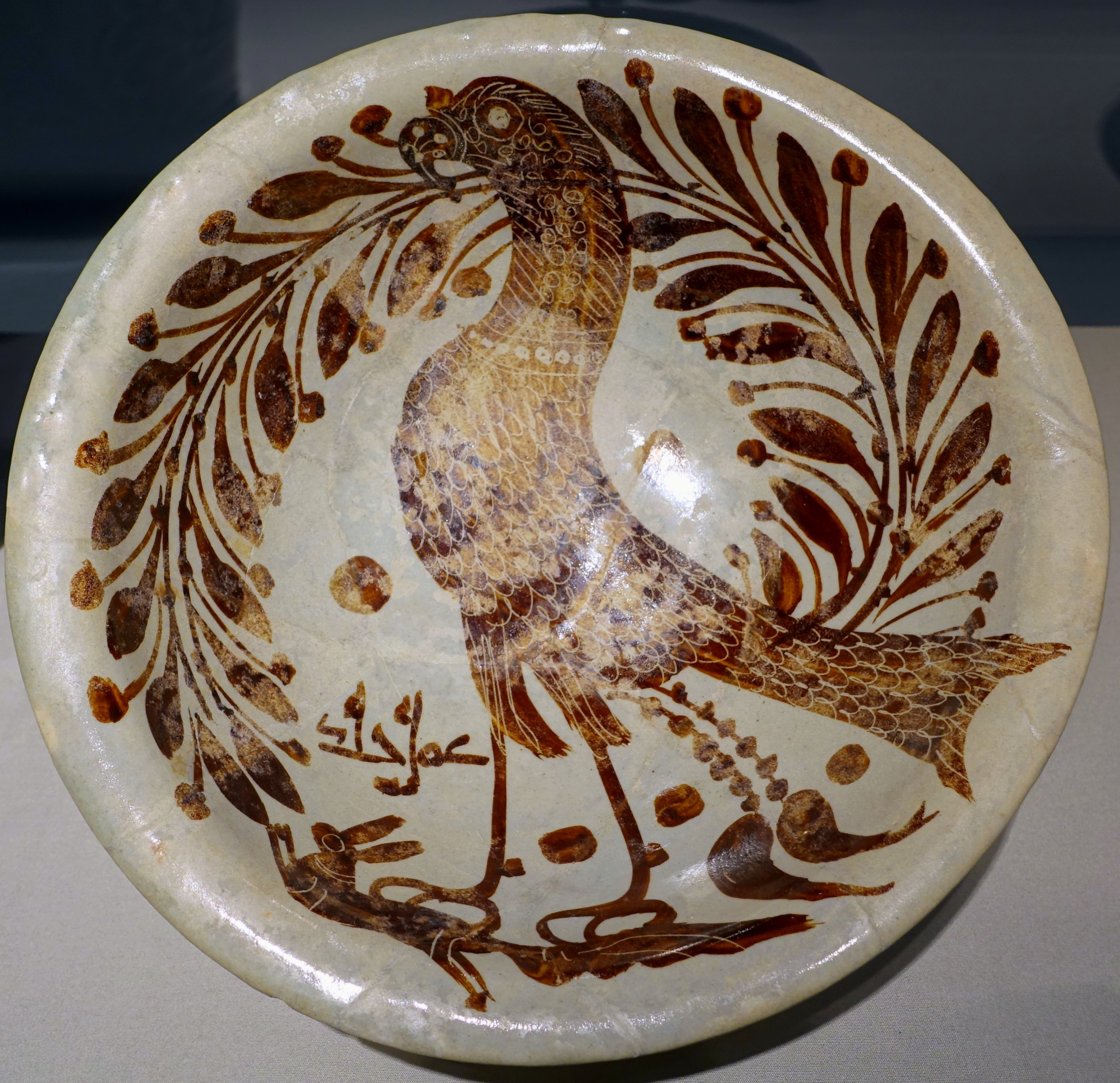
Lustreware bowl from 9th century Samarra

Islamic culture as a whole, and Abbasid artisans in particular, were at the forefront of new ideas and techniques in ceramic production. The importation of Chinese ceramics elicited local imitations but also stirred innovations in local production. Abbasid ceramics became a more important art form than ceramics in previous periods and were produced with a greater emphasis on decoration. A major innovation was the emergence of monochrome and polychrome lustreware, a technical achievement that had an important impact on the wider development of Islamic ceramics. This technique likely originated in glassware and was then borrowed into ceramic production.

Examples of Abbasid work were pieces engraved with decorations and then colored with yellow-brown, green, and purple glazes. Designs were diverse with geometric patterns, Kufic lettering, and arabesque scrollwork, along with rosettes, animals, birds, and humans. Abbasid pottery from the 8th and 9th centuries has been found throughout the region, as far as Cairo. These lustreware pieces were generally made with a yellow clay and fired multiple times with separate glazes to produce metallic luster in shades of gold, brown, or red. By the 9th century, the potters had mastered their techniques and their decorative designs. The examples produced in Iran show animals, birds, and humans, along with Kufic lettering in gold. Pieces dating from Samarra (between 836 and 883), generally made for the caliph's use, are particularly vibrant and finer than those of other periods. Tiles were also made using this same technique to create both monochromatic and polychromatic lustreware tiles.

== Glass and crystal ==
Glassware also became a more important art form in the Abbasid period. The Near East had, since Roman times, been a center of quality glassware and rock crystal pieces. 9th-century finds from Samarra show styles similar to Sassanian forms. The types of objects made were bottles, flasks, vases, and cups intended for domestic use, with decorations including molded flutes, honeycomb patterns, and inscriptions. Other styles seen that may not have come from the Sassanians were stamped items. These were typically round stamps, such as medallions or disks with animals, birds, or Kufic inscriptions. Colored lead glass, typically blue or green, has been found in Nishapur, along with prismatic perfume bottles. Cut glass may have been the high point of Abbasid glass-working, decorated with floral and animal designs. Evidence for the use of lustre painting in glass prior to its use in ceramics can be seen in a goblet excavated at Fustat, Egypt, and dating from the second half of the 8th century. It features lustre-painted floral motifs and a Kufic inscription.

== Metalwork ==
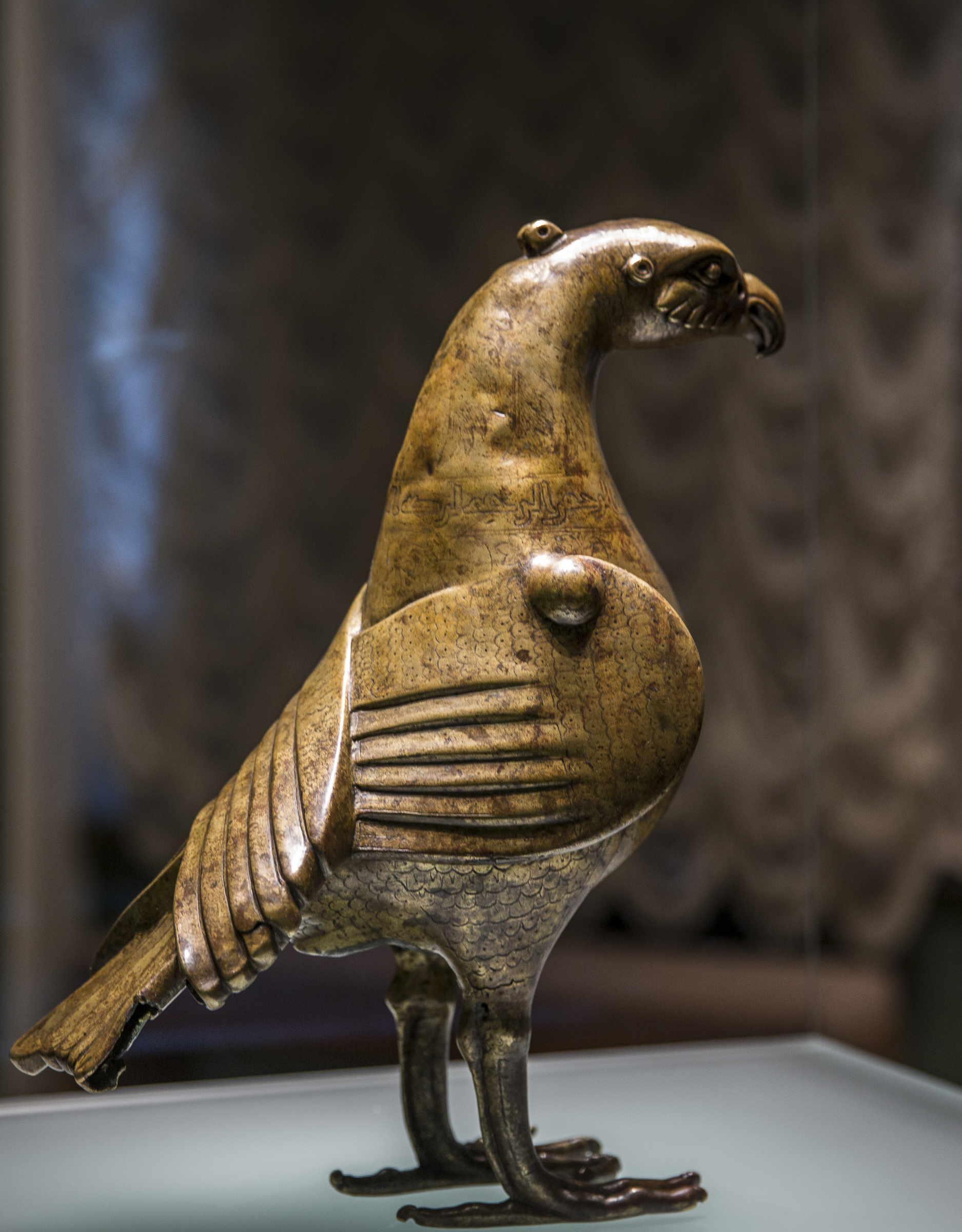
Copper-alloy vessel in shape of a bird, dated to 796–7 CE

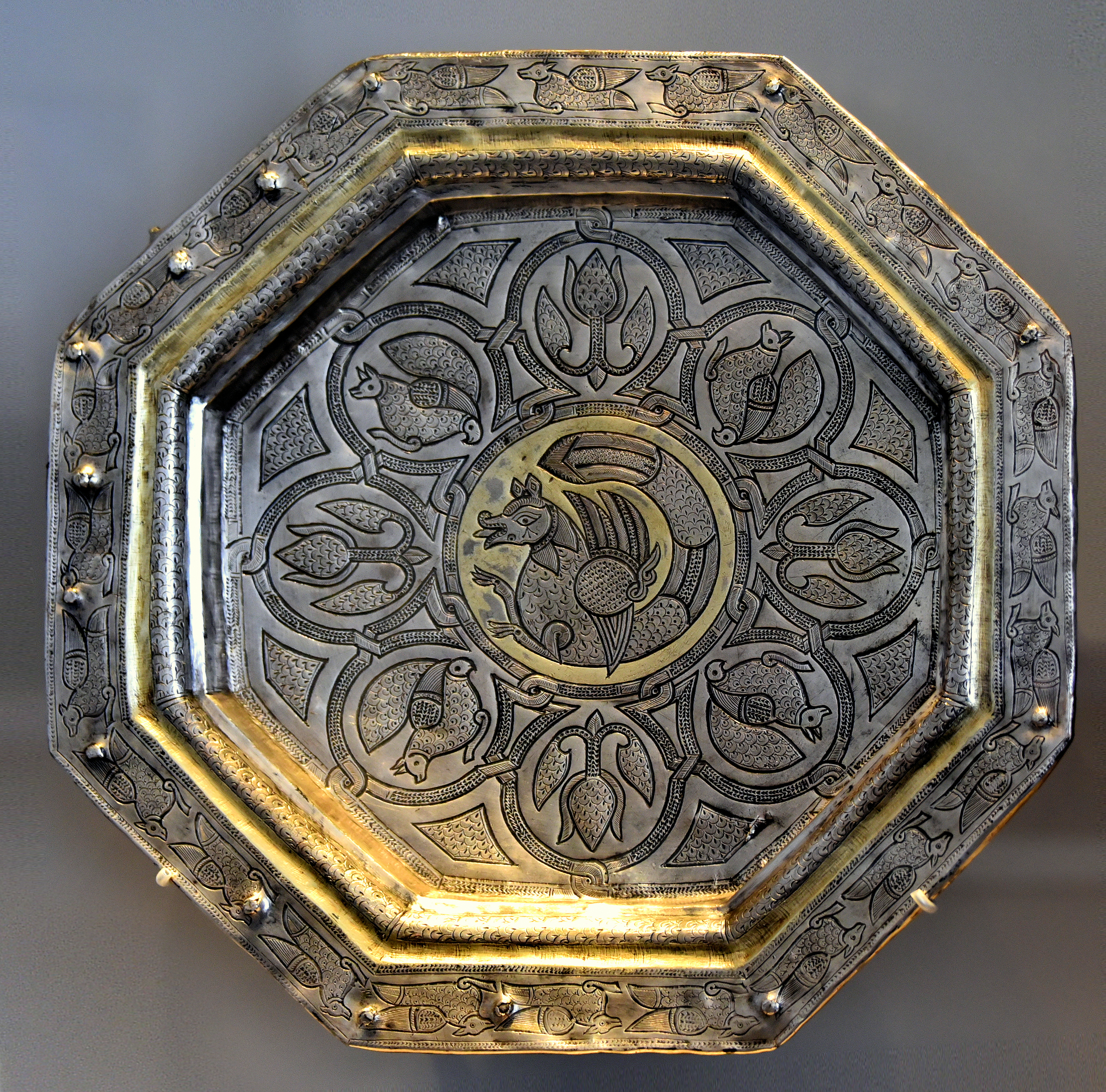
Silver dish from Iran, 9th or 10th century, derived from earlier Sasanian types but employing more stylized decoration

While historical texts record the presence of gold and silverware, relatively little metalwork has survived from this period as precious metals were frequently melted down and reused in later work. Archeological investigations have turned up some vessels made of bronze or brass. One exemplary object is the copper-alloy pouring vessel in the shape of a bird, dated to 180 AH (796–7 CE), currently in the Hermitage Museum. The bird is sculpted in a slightly stylized form and has surface decoration of floral motifs and Arabic inscriptions. Originally, it was also inlaid, making it one of the earliest known examples of metal inlay being revived during the Islamic period. This technique would go on to be very important in later Islamic metalwork.

In Iran, silver dishes in the Sasanian tradition continued to be made. Rather than the hunting scenes and mythical creatures of Sasanian designs, new pieces were decorated with interlacing floral motifs and stylized animals.

== Stucco ==
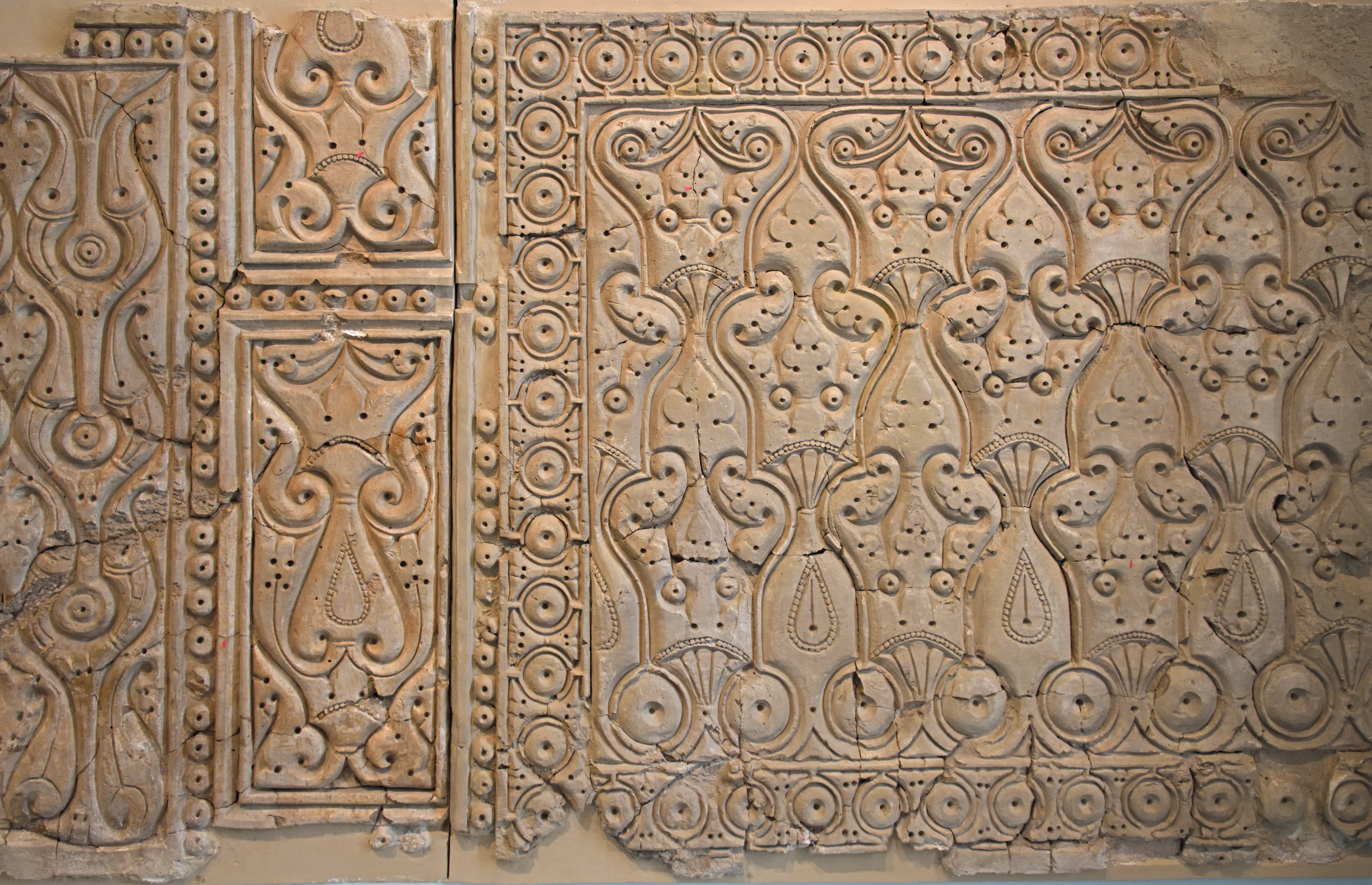
Carved stucco panels from Samarra (9th century) in Style C or "beveled" style, showing flatter and more abstract motifs (at the Museum of Islamic Art, Berlin)

der the Abbasids in Iraq stucco decoration developed more abstract motifs, as seen in the 9th-century palaces of Samarra. Three styles are distinguished by modern scholars: "style A" consists of vegetal motifs, including vine leaves, derived from more traditional Byzantine and Levantine styles; "style B" is a more abstract and stylized version of these motifs; and "style C", also known as the "beveled" style, is entirely abstract, consisting of repeating symmetrical forms of curved lines ending in spirals. The Abbasid style became popular throughout the lands of the Abbasid Caliphate and is found as far as Afghanistan (e.g. the Nine Dome Mosque in Balkh) and Egypt (e.g. Ibn Tulun Mosque).

== Textiles ==
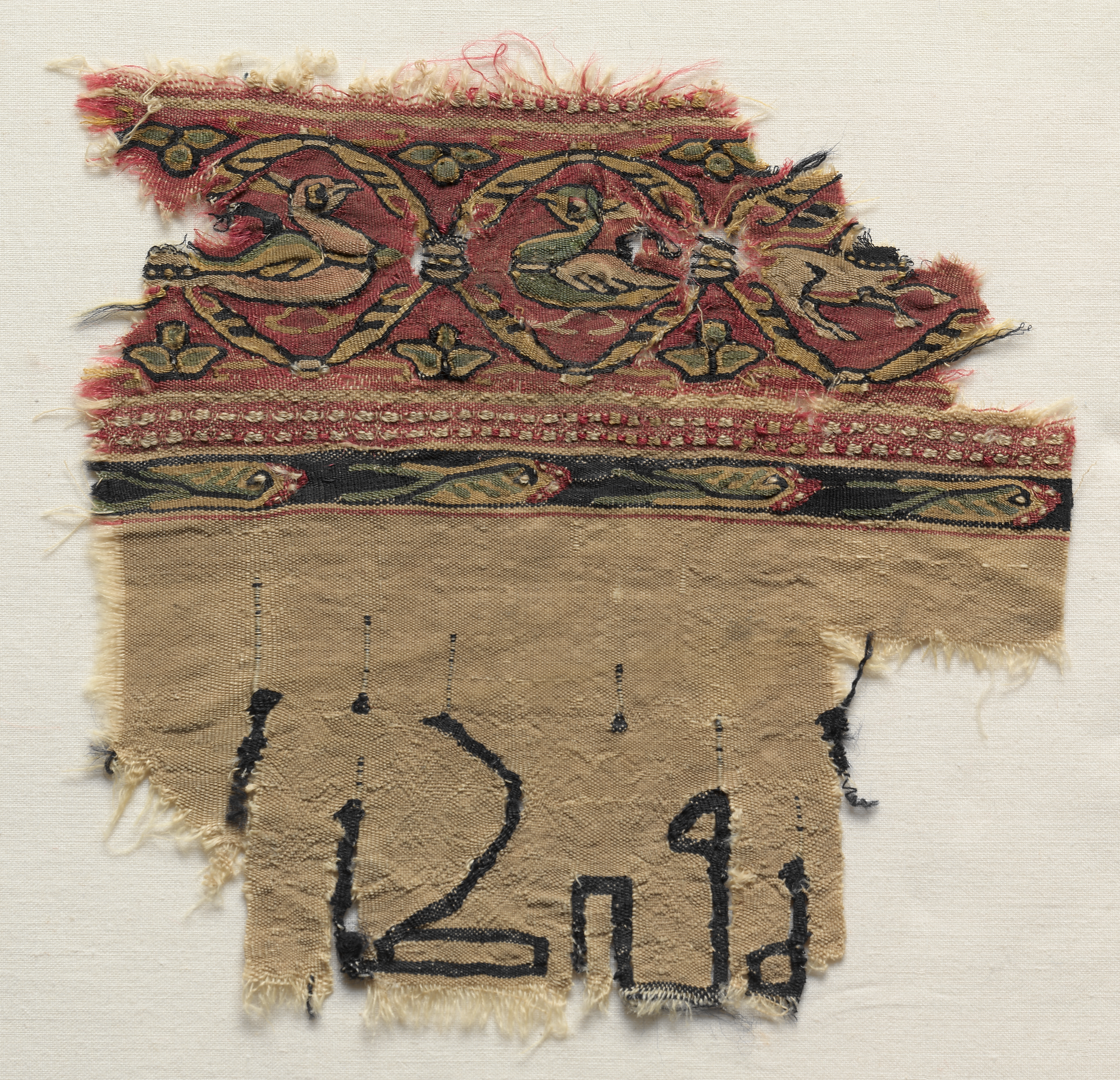
Fragment of tiraz textile produced in Egypt, early 9th century

Few Abbasid textiles have survived aside from the examples found in Egypt, whose dry climate aided preservation. The production of textiles with royal inscriptions, called tiraz, is one type that is well attested. In Egypt, Copts were employed in the textile industry and produced linens and silks. Tinnis was famous for its factories and had over 5,000 looms. Examples of textiles were kasab, a fine linen for turbans, and badana for upper-class garments. The kiswah for the Kaaba in Mecca was made in a town named Tuna near Tinnis. Fine silk was also made in Dabik and Damietta. Of particular interest are stamped and inscribed fabrics, which used not only inks but also liquid gold. Some of the finer pieces were colored in such a manner as to require six separate stamps to achieve the proper design and color. This technology spread to Europe eventually.

== Clothing ==
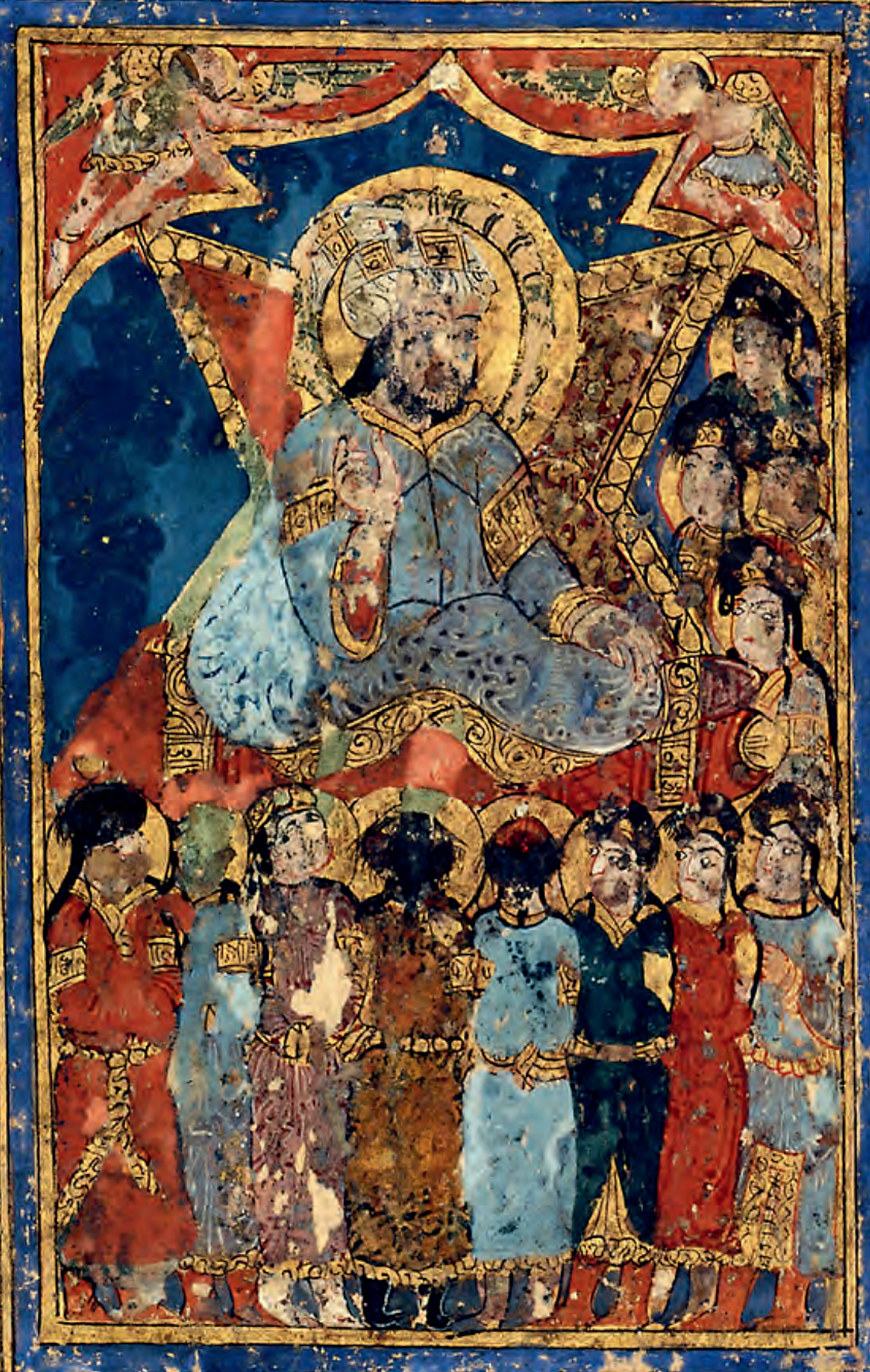
Dignitary in loose-fitting dress and turban. Illustration from a manuscript of the Maqamat by al-Hariri (d. 1122), dated to 1237, Baghdad.

The Abbasid period saw a large fashion development throughout its existence. While the development of fashion began during the Umayyad period, its genuine cosmopolitan styles and influence were realized at their finest during Abbasid rule. Fashion was a thriving industry during the Abbasid period that was also strictly regulated either by law or through the accepted elements of style. Among the higher classes, appearance became a concern and they started to care about appearance and fashion. Several new garments and fabrics were introduced into common use and no longer observed pious distaste for materials such as silk and satins. The rise of the Persian secretarial class had a large influence over the development of fashion and the Abbasids were highly influenced by the older Persian Court dress elements. For example, the caliph al-Muʿtasim was reportedly notable for his desire to imitate Persian kings by wearing a turban over a soft cap which was later adopted by other Abbasid rulers and called it the "muʿtasimi" in his honor.

The Abbasids wore many layers of garments. Fabrics used for the clothing seemed to have included wool, linen, brocades, or silk the clothing of the poorer classes was made out of cheaper materials, such as wool, and had less fabric. This also meant they wouldn't be able to afford the variety of garments that the elite classes wore. Elegant women would not wear black, green, red, or pink, except for fabrics that naturally had those colors, such as red silk. Women's clothing would be perfumed with musk, sandalwood, hyacinth or ambergris, but no other scents. Footwear included furry Cambay shoes, boots of the style of Persian women, and curved shoes.

Caliph al-Mansur was credited with making his court and the Abbasid high-ranking officials wear honorific robes of the color black for various ceremonial affairs and events which became the official color of the caliphate. This was acknowledged in China and Byzantium who called the Abbasids the "black-robed ones". But despite the color black being common during the caliphate, many color dyes existed and it was made sure that colors would not clash. Notably, the color yellow needed to be avoided when wearing colored clothing.

Abbasid Caliphs wore elegant kaftans, a robe made from silver or gold brocade and buttons in the front of the sleeves. Caliph al-Muqtaddir wore a kaftan from silver brocade Tustari silk and his son one made from Byzantine silk richly decorated or ornamented with figures. The kaftan was spread far and wide by the Abbasids and made known throughout the Arab world. In the 830s, Emperor Theophilus, went about à l'arabe in kaftans and turbans. Even as far as the streets of Ghuangzhou during the era of Tang dynasty, the Persian kaftan was in fashion.

== Manuscripts ==
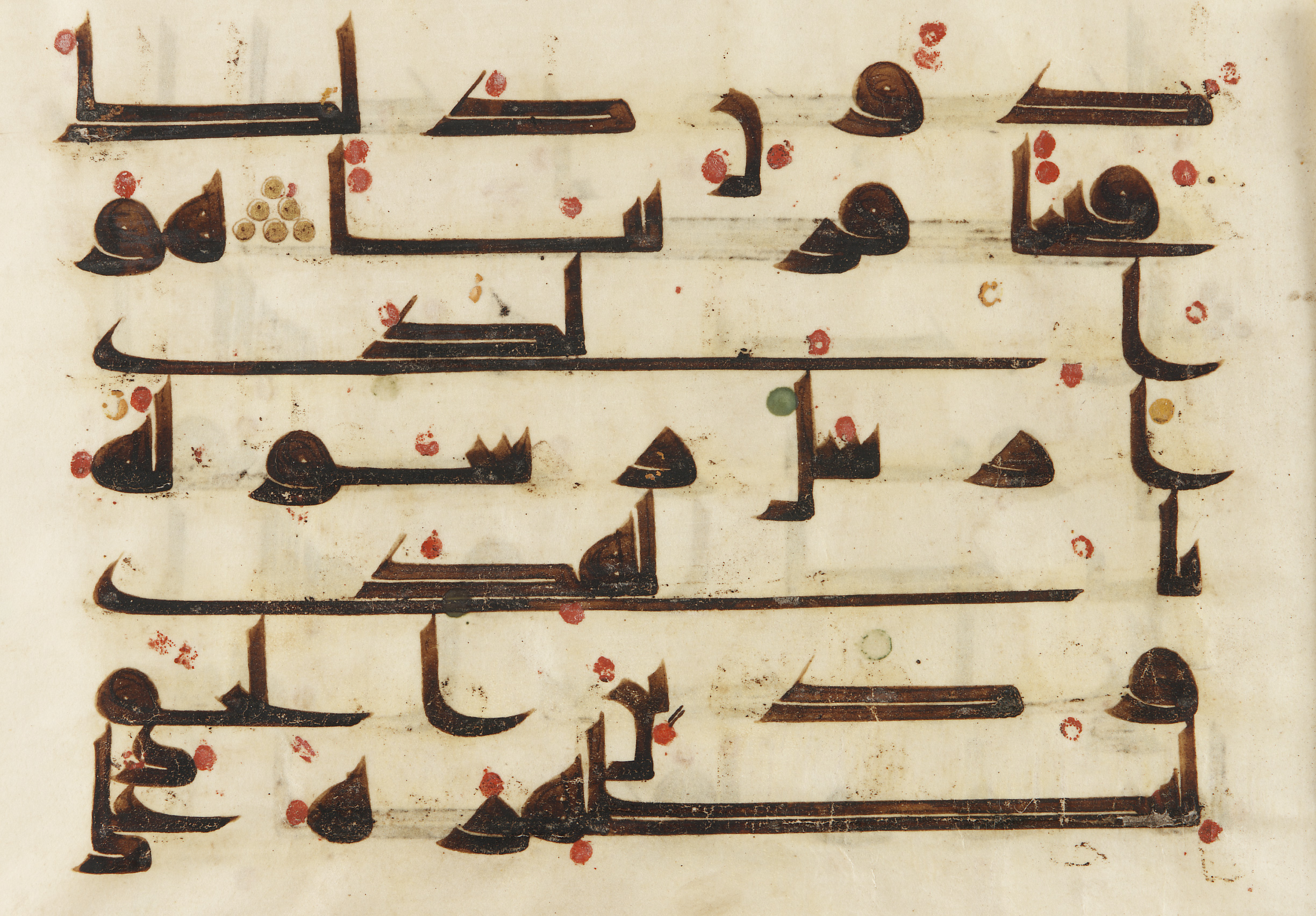
Folio from an 8th-9th century Qur'an

Qur'ans are the main type of book to have survived from this period. The production of Qur'anic manuscripts flourished under the Abbasid Caliphate primarily between the late 8th and early 10th century. During this period, copies of the Qur'an were frequently commissioned for members of the Abbasid court and the wealthy elite in Muslim society. With the increased dissemination of the Qur'an also came the growth of Arabic calligraphy, bookbinding techniques, and illumination styles. This expansion and establishment of the book arts culminated in a formative period of the Islamic manuscript tradition. Parchment only allowed for a few lines of script, but from the late 8th century onward paper began to be produced.

=== Calligraphy ===
During the Abbasid period, Arabic calligraphy evolved into a more refined discipline. The earliest style of calligraphy used for Abbasid Qur'ans was known as the Kufic script—a script distinguished by precise, angular letters, generous spacing, horizontal extension of letters at the baseline and an emphasis on geometric proportion. Qur'ans copied in this script were typically formatted in a horizontal manner and were written on parchment. Qur'ans of this variety were most popular in the second half of the 8th century.

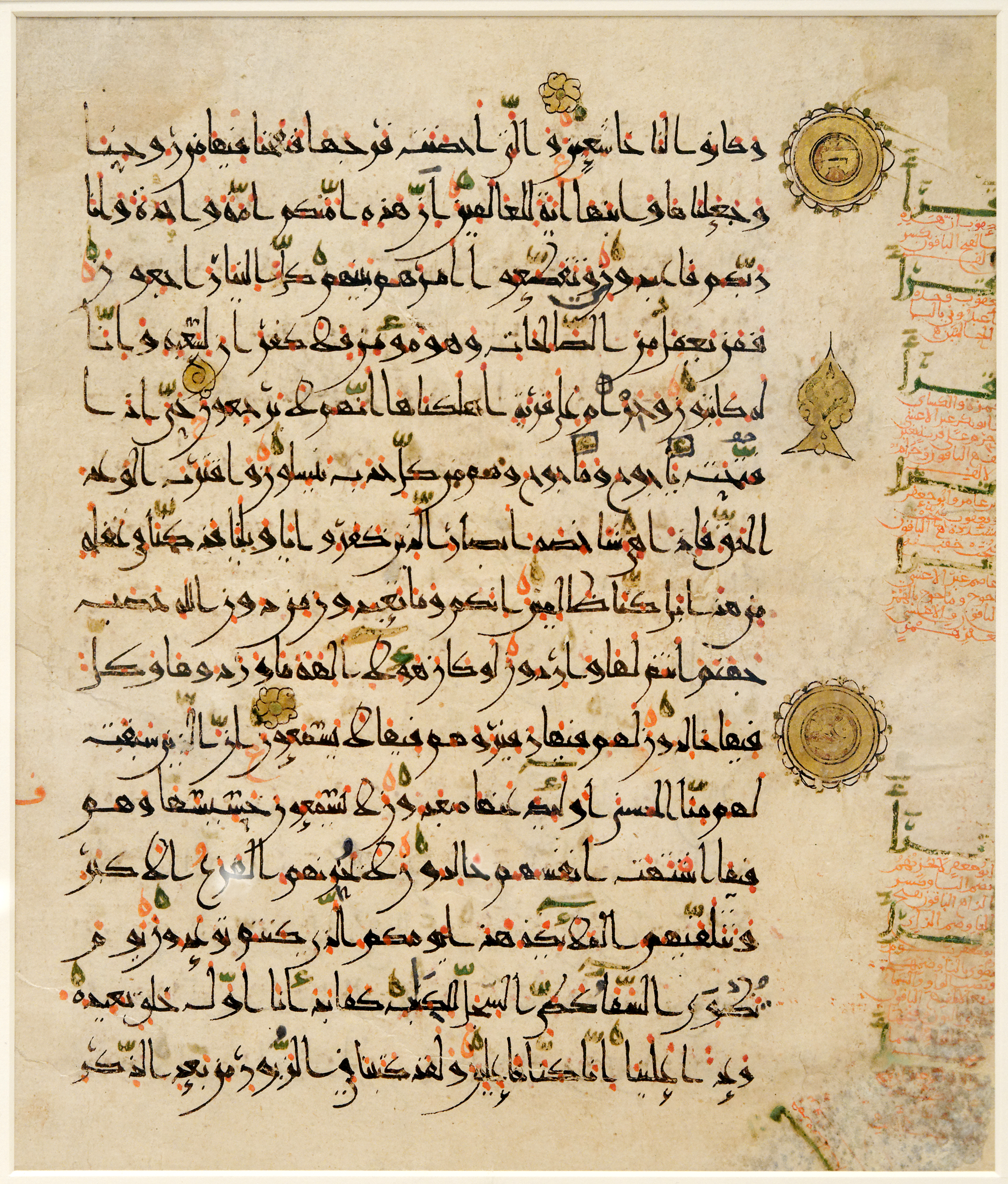
Example of the "New Abbasid Style" script, from late 10th century Qur'an manuscript

During the late 9th century and early 10th century, a new system of calligraphy was introduced by Abbasid vizier and calligrapher Abu 'Ali Muhammad Ibn Muqla (866–940). He developed this proportional writing system around two shapes: a circle the size of an alif and rhomboid dots that could be created with the nib of a reed pen. This script, later known as the "New Abbasid style", was characterized by its vertical letters, extreme angularity, and a distinct contrast between the width of strokes. The development of this proportional script also coincided with a shift back into a vertical page orientation. The New style script was further developed for secular purposes because of its legibility and efficient nature.

=== Illumination ===
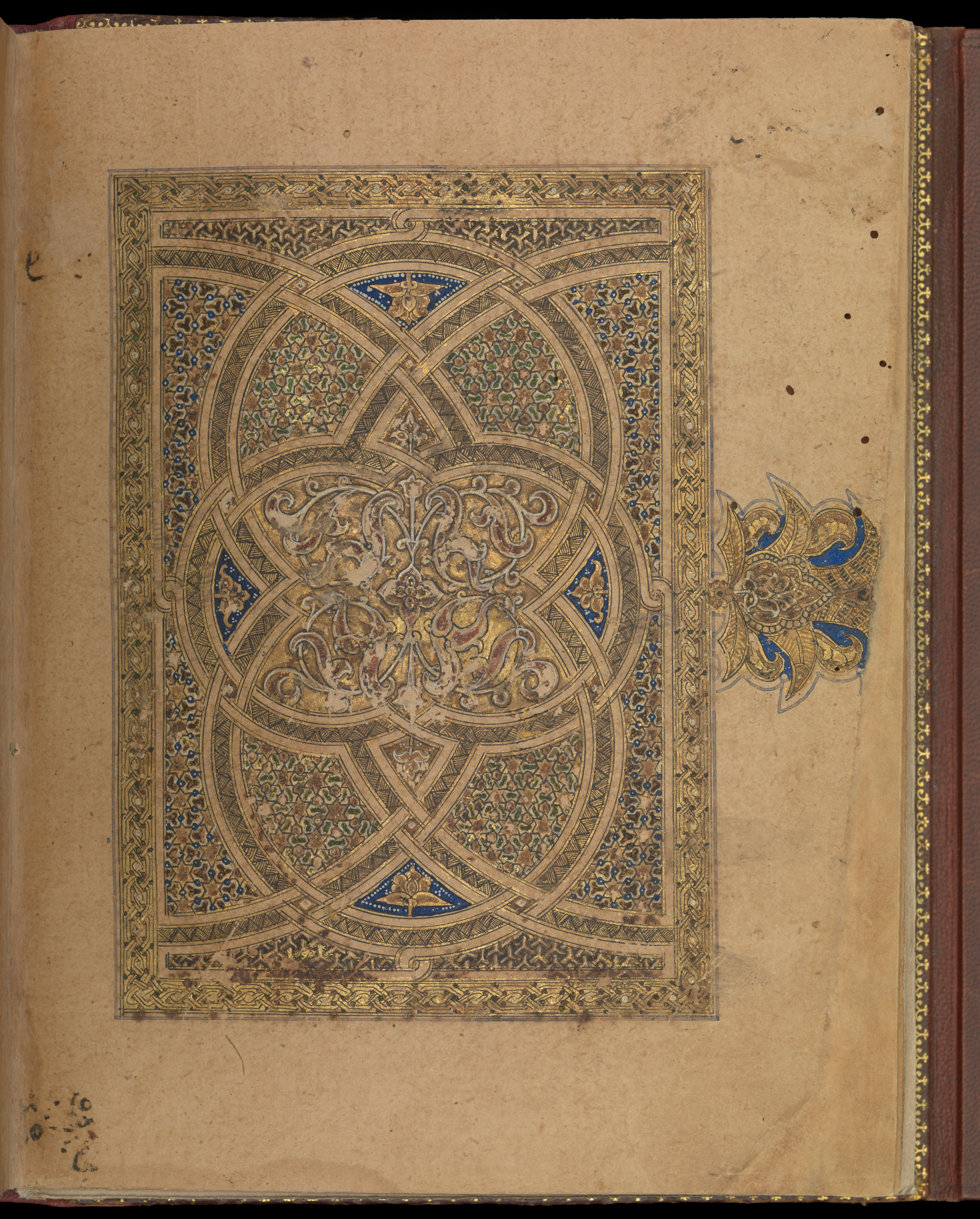
Late example of vegetal and geometric illumination from a Qur'an, c. 1000

Illumination techniques and trends under the Abbasid Caliphate were often dependent upon script style. As Qur'ans shifted from Kufic to New style script, illumination methods also changed. The illumination of early Abbasid Qur'ans (late 8th century) was largely dominated by geometric and vegetal shapes. These ornamental elements were often concentrated at the beginning and end of volumes as well as in between Suras. Another defining element of the early Abbasid technique was the absence of text on the frontispiece of the Qur'an. The introduction of the "New Abbasid Style" in the 10th century, however, led to a shift in illumination techniques. Illuminators found ways to accommodate the dense script and vertical orientation of text. As such, illuminated Qur'ans began to display additional decorative elements (beyond geometric and vegetal shapes) to denote divisions within the text. Furthermore, Qur'ans with the New style of script were copied with the first Sura on the frontispiece of the manuscript. These stylistic shifts are representative of developing illumination arts under Abbasid rule.

=== Bookbinding ===
The main form of bookbinding used under the Abbasid Caliphate was the binding-cum-case or box manuscript. This technique covered the Qur'an in a casket-like box in order to protect the contents. These boxes were typically made out of wooden boards and had a protective lining on the manuscript-facing side. The leather-bound Qur'an would have been placed in the box which then would have been fitted with a locking mechanism.

=== The Amajur Qur'an ===
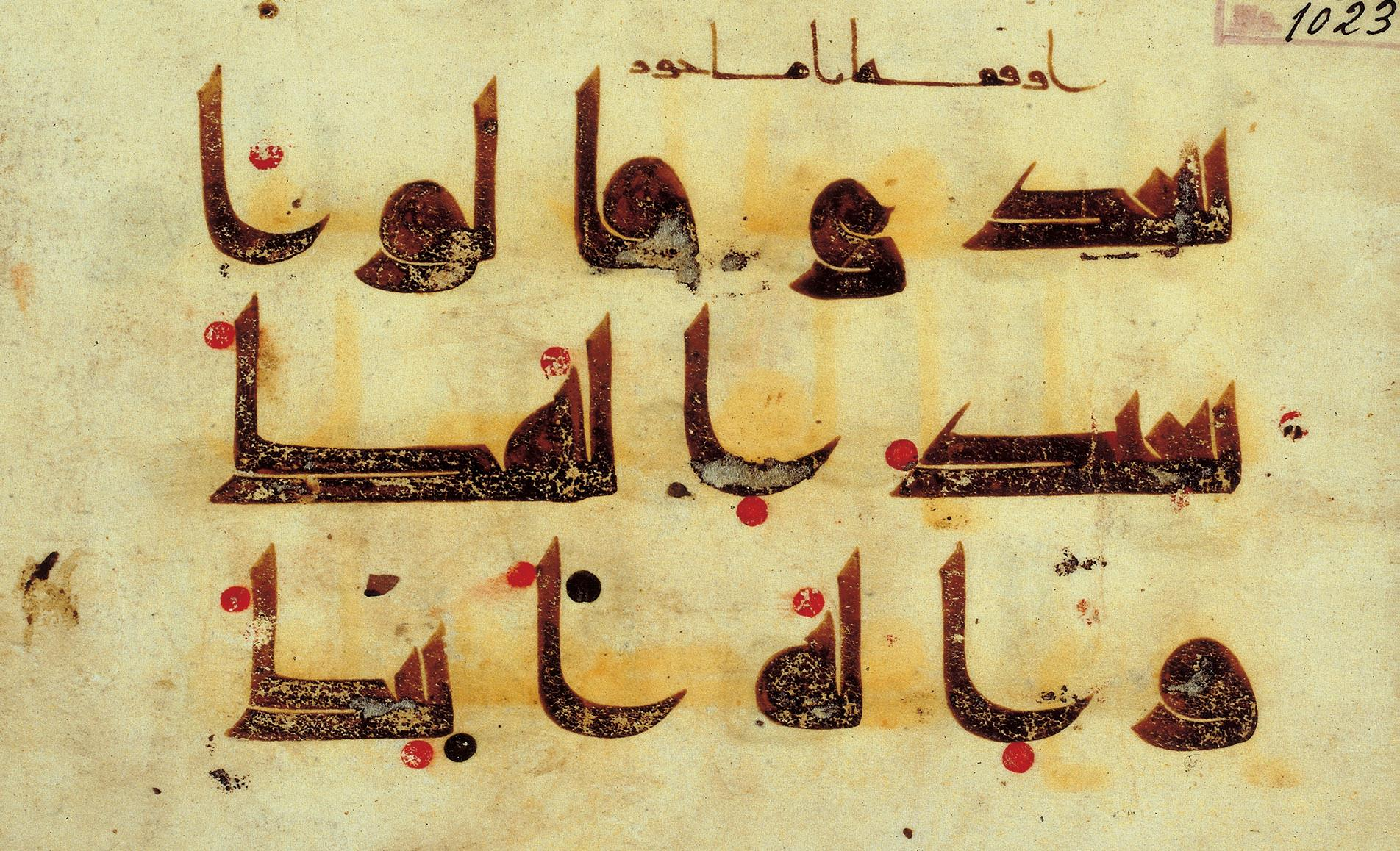
Page from the Amajur Qur'an, 9th century

One of the most notable parchment manuscripts created during the early Abbasid Caliphate was the Amajur Qur'an. This Qur'an was endowed by Amajur al-Turki—the Abbasid Governor of Damascus from 870 to 878—and was created during the 9th century. Despite being a luxury example, this Qur'an is indicative of the form and script practices that were being standardized in the heart of the early Abbasid Caliphate. The text was copied in the Kufic style and in a horizontal orientation. The style of script, size, and oblong shape of the Amajur Qur'an aligned with other examples from the 9th century. Furthermore, the Qur'an was copied onto parchment—a material that was commonly used for manuscripts under early Abbasid rule. Lastly, the Amajur Qur'an was bound in leather and stored in a protective chest. This bookbinding style was a standard technique during the 9th century.

== See also ==
- Blue Quran
- Fatimid art
