= Khuran-e Olya =

Khuran-e Olya خوران عليا
- Village
- Location within Iran
- Coordinates: 33°49′27″N 46°14′49″E
- Country: Iran
- Province: Ilam
- County: Eyvan
- Bakhsh: Central
- Rural District: Nabovat

Population (2006)
  - Total: 615
- Time zone: UTC+3:30 (IRST)
  - Summer (DST): UTC+4:30 (IRDT)

Khuran-e Olya (Persian: خوران عليا, also Romanized as Khūrān-e ‘Olyā; also known as Khūrān and Khvorān) is a village in Nabovat Rural District, in the Central District of Eyvan County, Ilam Province, Iran. At the 2006 census, its population was 615, in 111 families. The village is populated by Kurds.
