= Kurana, Uttar Pradesh =

Kurana, Haryana

Coordinates: 29°17′N 76°43′E

Kurana (Village Id:059531) located in Tehsil: Dhaulana, District: hapur, State: Uttar pardesh

Historically, Kurana and Meerpur Khudaliya were considered two separate hamlets, but over time they have grown together and are now recognized as a single unified village under the name Kurana.

The village was founded approximately 205 years ago by families from the Jaat community who migrated from Bhatiyana village in Hapur district. Among the most respected ancestors was Chinday Kha, the grandson of Choudhary Maan Singh , a notable figure in the community. Chinday Kha’s son, Abdul Hakim, carried forward his father’s legacy and played a key role in developing the village socially and structurally.

The Jaat lineage that settled Kurana is remembered for their leadership, courage, and contributions to the land and its people. The community fostered a strong rural identity rooted in unity, agriculture, and cultural heritage.

As per the 2011 Census, Kurana has a population of 4,103 residents living in 590 households. The village continues to thrive, preserving the traditions, values, and history passed down by its founding families.
