= Kuran-e Olya =

Kuran-e Olya كوران عليا
- Village
- Location within Iran
- Coordinates: 27°25′34″N 60°50′12″E
- Country: Iran
- Province: Sistan and Baluchestan
- County: Iranshahr
- Bakhsh: Central
- Rural District: Damen

Population (2006)
  - Total: 641
- Time zone: UTC+3:30 (IRST)
  - Summer (DST): UTC+4:30 (IRDT)

Kuran-e Olya (Persian: كوران عليا, also Romanized as Kūrān-e ‘Olyā, Kooran Olya, Kūrān-e ‘Oleyā, and Kūrān ‘Olyā; also known as Kūrān-e Bālā) is a village in Damen Rural District, in the Central District of Iranshahr County, Sistan and Baluchestan Province, Iran. At the 2006 census, its population was 641, in 132 families.
