= Kurana, Bhopal =

Kurana
- village
- Location within Madhya Pradesh Location within India
- Coordinates: 23.3225054°N 77.3266991°E
- Country: India
- State: Madhya Pradesh
- District: Bhopal
- Tehsil: Huzur
- Elevation: 501 m (1,644 ft)

Population (2011)
  - Total: 2,270
- Time zone: UTC+5:30 (IST)
- ISO 3166 code: MP-IN
- 2011 census code: 482460

Kurana is a village in the Bhopal district of Madhya Pradesh, India. It is located in the Huzur tehsil and the Phanda block.

== Demographics ==
According to the 2011 census of India, Kurana has 441 households. The effective literacy rate (i.e. the literacy rate of population excluding children aged 6 and below) is 70.44%.

Demographics (2011 Census)
	Total	Male	Female
Population	2270	1158	1112
Children aged below 6 years	335	159	176
Scheduled caste	1058	555	503
Scheduled tribe	54	28	26
Literates	1363	816	547
Workers (all)	775	580	195
Main workers (total)	641	521	120
Main workers: Cultivators	198	184	14
Main workers: Agricultural labourers	185	142	43
Main workers: Household industry workers	11	8	3
Main workers: Other	247	187	60
Marginal workers (total)	134	59	75
Marginal workers: Cultivators	6	2	4
Marginal workers: Agricultural labourers	76	20	56
Marginal workers: Household industry workers	4	3	1
Marginal workers: Others	48	34	14
Non-workers	1495	578	917
