= Kurgah =

Kurgah كورگاه
- Village
- Location within Iran
- Coordinates: 29°36′35″N 55°50′30″E
- Country: Iran
- Province: Kerman
- County: Sirjan
- Bakhsh: Pariz
- Rural District: Saadatabad

Population (2006)
  - Total: 297
- Time zone: UTC+3:30 (IRST)
  - Summer (DST): UTC+4:30 (IRDT)

Kurgah (Persian: كورگاه, also Romanized as Kūrgāh; also known as Kūrān) is a village in Saadatabad Rural District, Pariz District, Sirjan County, Kerman Province, Iran. At the 2006 census, its population was 297, in 64 families.
