= Khuran-e Sofla =

Khuran-e Sofla خوران سفلي
- Village
- Location within Iran
- Coordinates: 33°49′46″N 46°14′33″E
- Country: Iran
- Province: Ilam
- County: Eyvan
- Bakhsh: Central
- Rural District: Nabovat

Population (2006)
  - Total: 166
- Time zone: UTC+3:30 (IRST)
  - Summer (DST): UTC+4:30 (IRDT)

Khuran-e Sofla (Persian: خوران سفلي, also Romanized as Khūrān-e Soflá) is a village in Nabovat Rural District, in the Central District of Eyvan County, Ilam Province, Iran. At the 2006 census, its population was 166, in 26 families. The village is populated by Kurds.
