= Khurana, India =

Coordinates: 30°15′N 75°54′E

Khurana
- village
- Interactive map of Khurana
- Country: India
- State: Punjab
- District: Sangrur

Languages
  - Official: Punjabi (Gurmukhi)
  - Regional: Punjabi
- Time zone: UTC+5:30 (IST)
- Nearest city: Sangrur

Khurana is a village in the Sangrur district of Punjab, India. It's located seven kilometers east of Sangrur city, on the Sangrur-Patiala road. Guru Hargobind, the sixth Guru of Sikhism, visited the village during his travels in 1616 CE coming from Akoī and stayed sometime close to the village pond, southeast of the village where a gurdwara Gurdwara Sahib Patshahi Chhevin now marks the site as a testimony to the visit.
