= Miniature Quran =

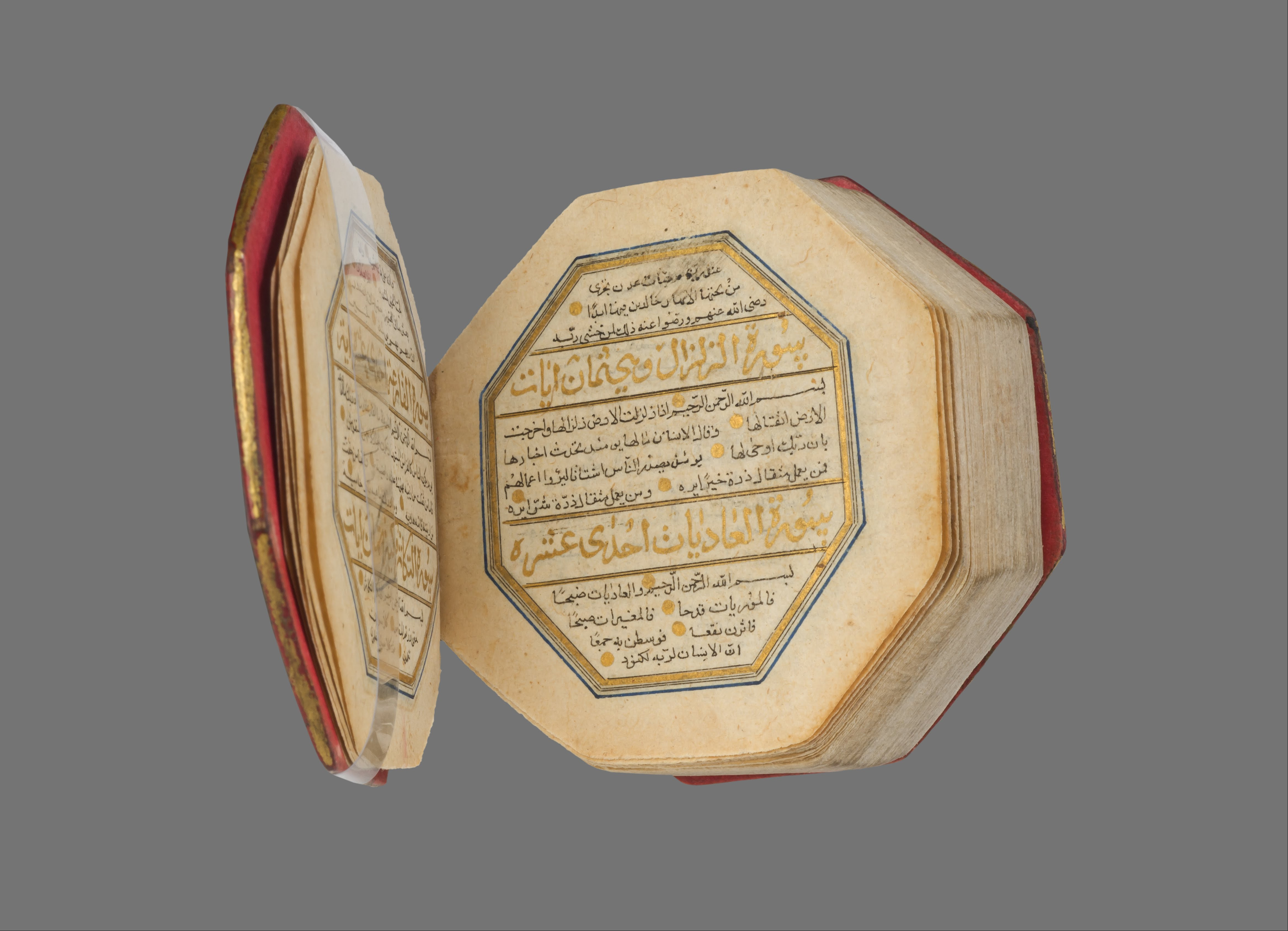
Miniature Qur'an (46 mm height) from the 16th century Iran. Museum of Islamic Art, Doha

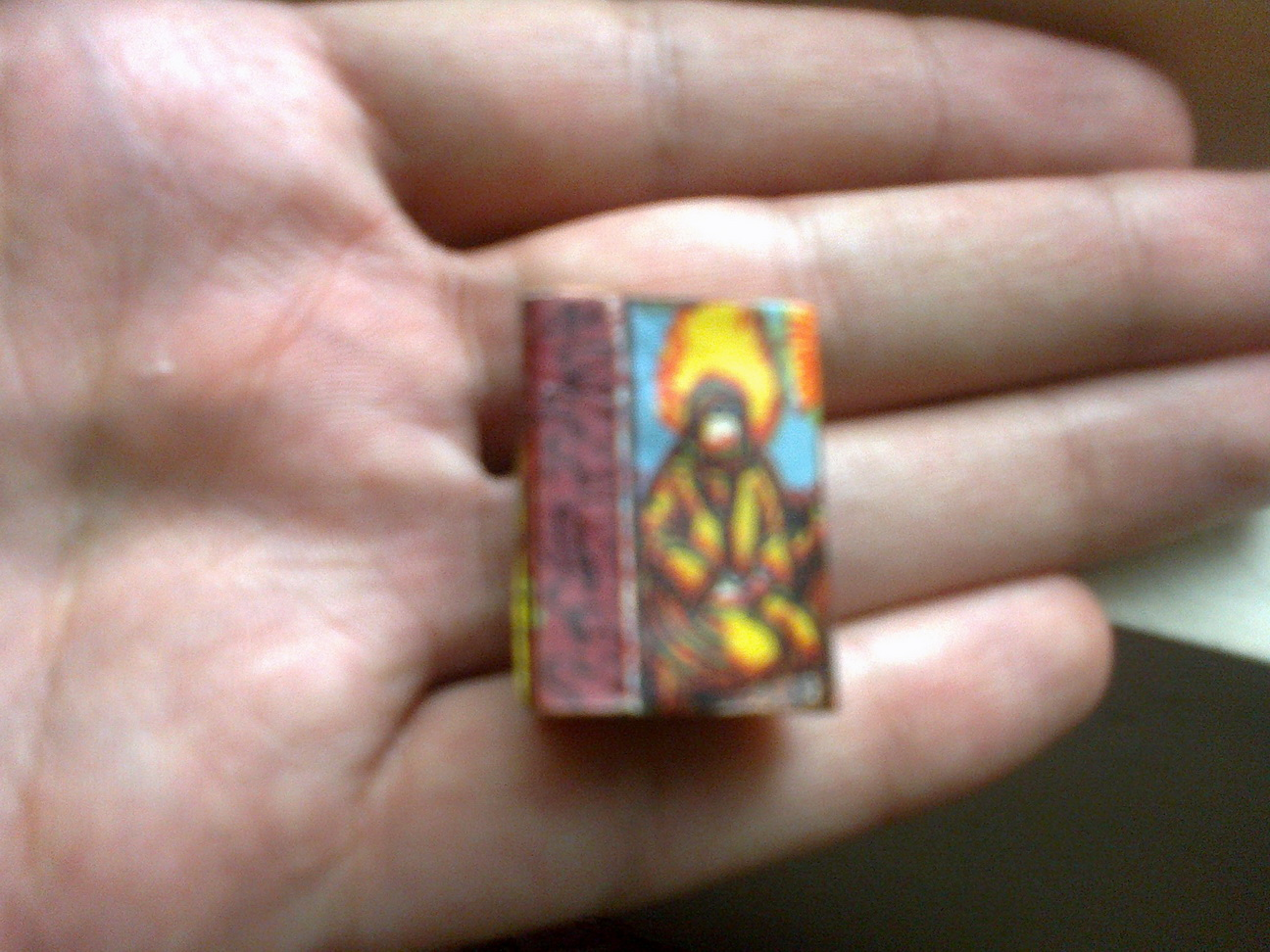
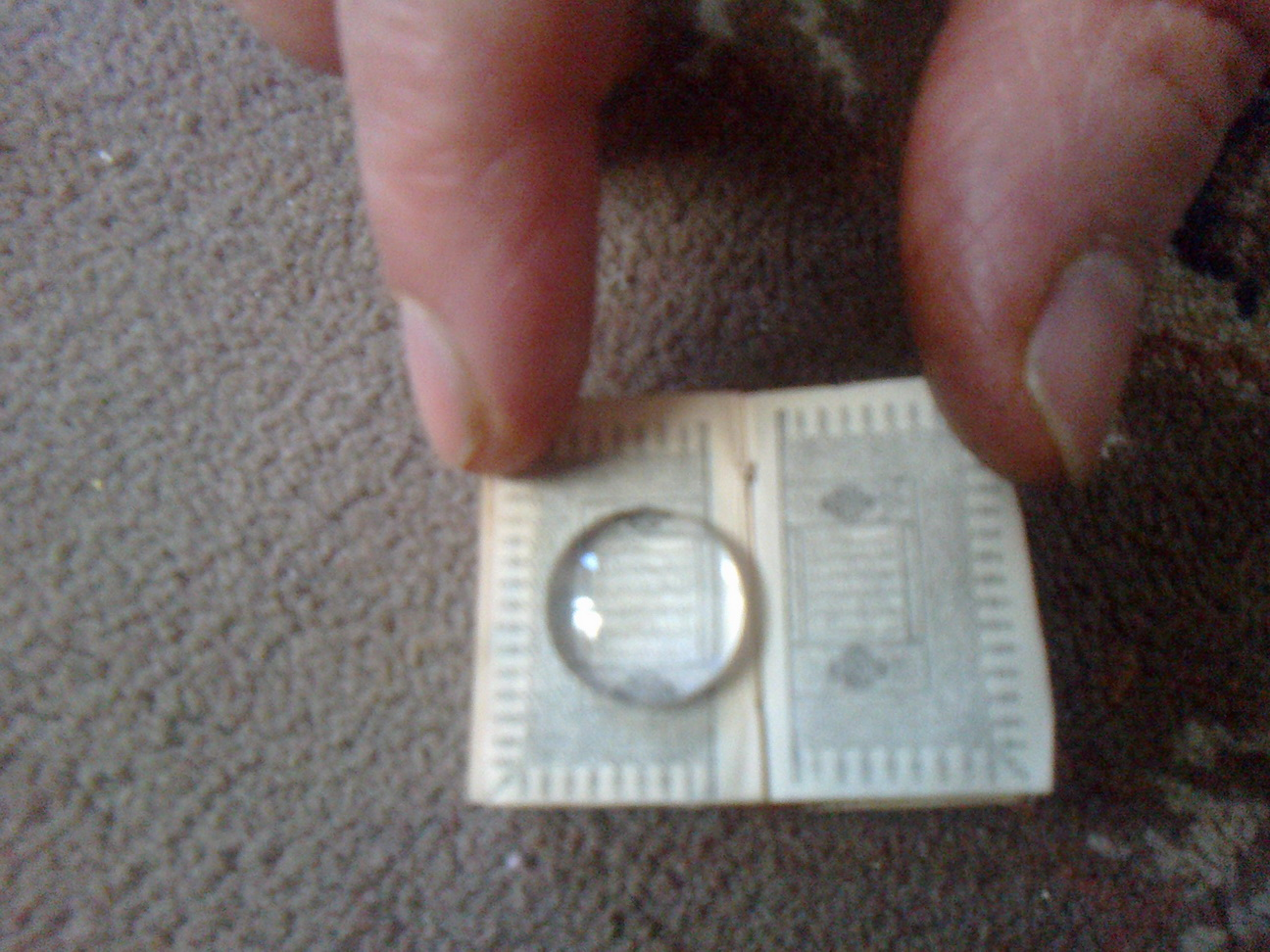
Antique mini Quran written in Persian, 2x1.5x1cm dimensions and a few thicker paper as wrapper. In its last 2 pages, in the Persian language, is written about 2 different Quran reading types between Basrians and Kufians. Ali, Hassan and Hussain painted on the wrapper.
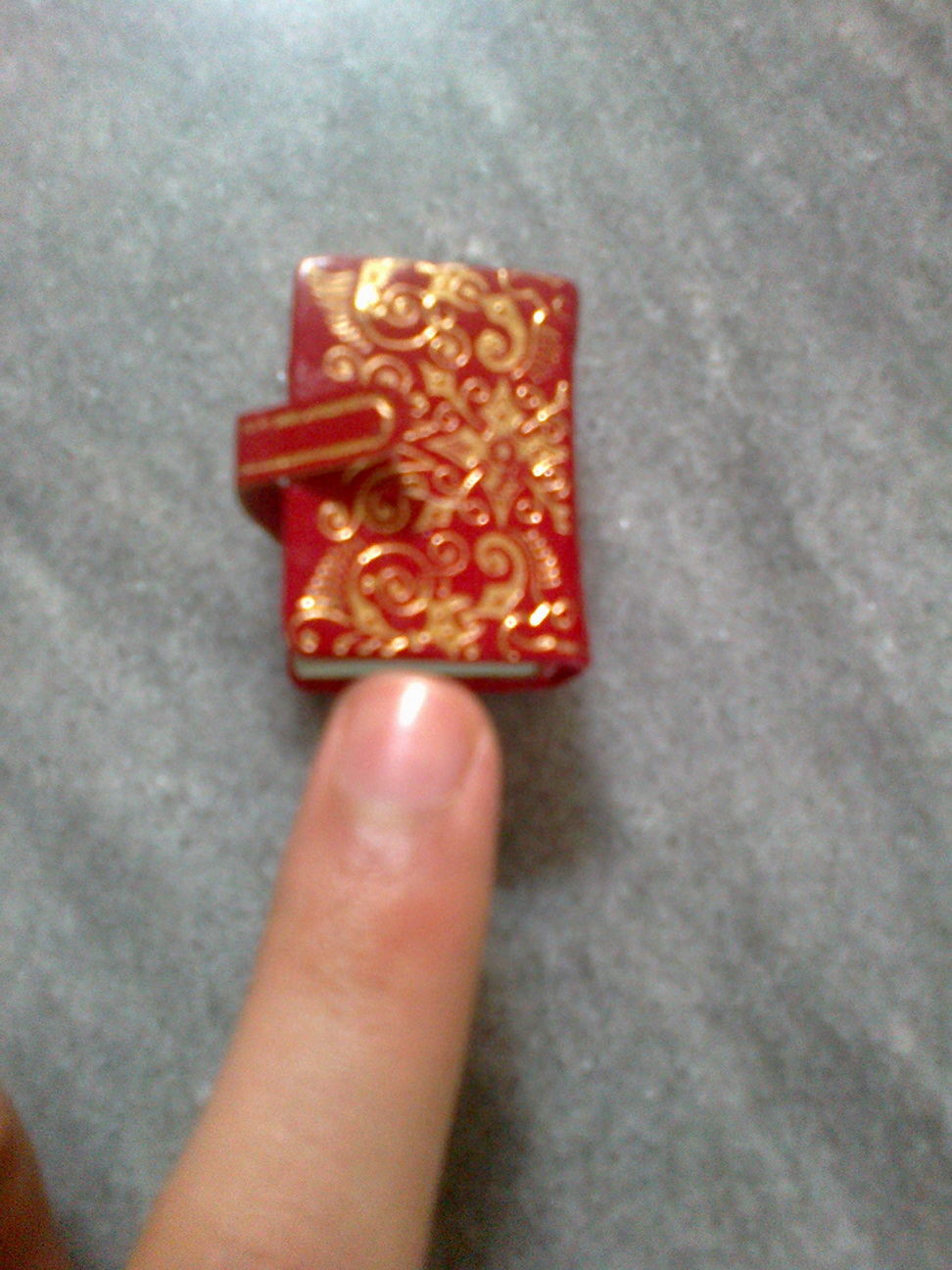
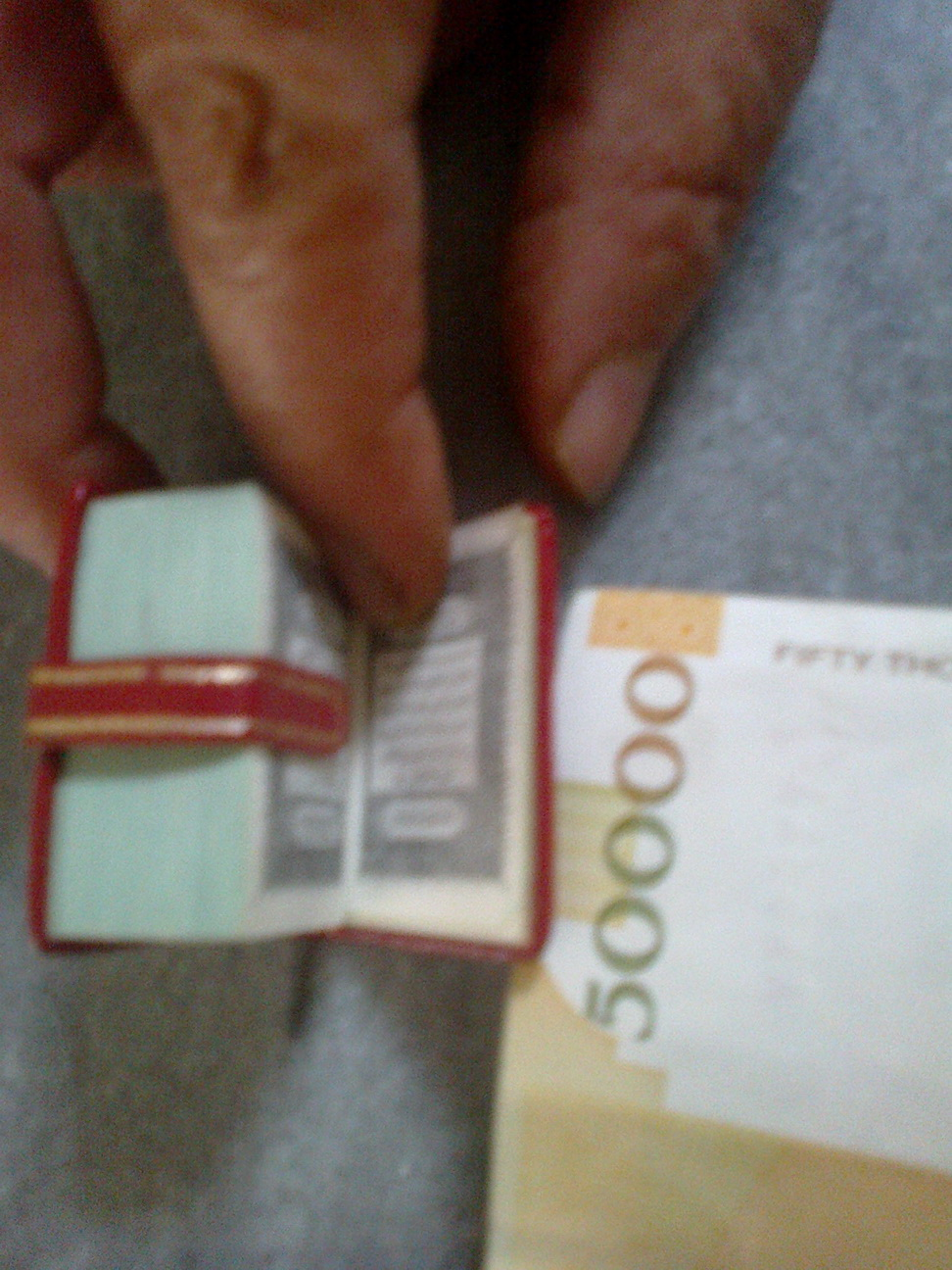
Mini Qur'an from Egypt, with a gilded leather wrapper. More than 100 years old based on the date of introduction page.
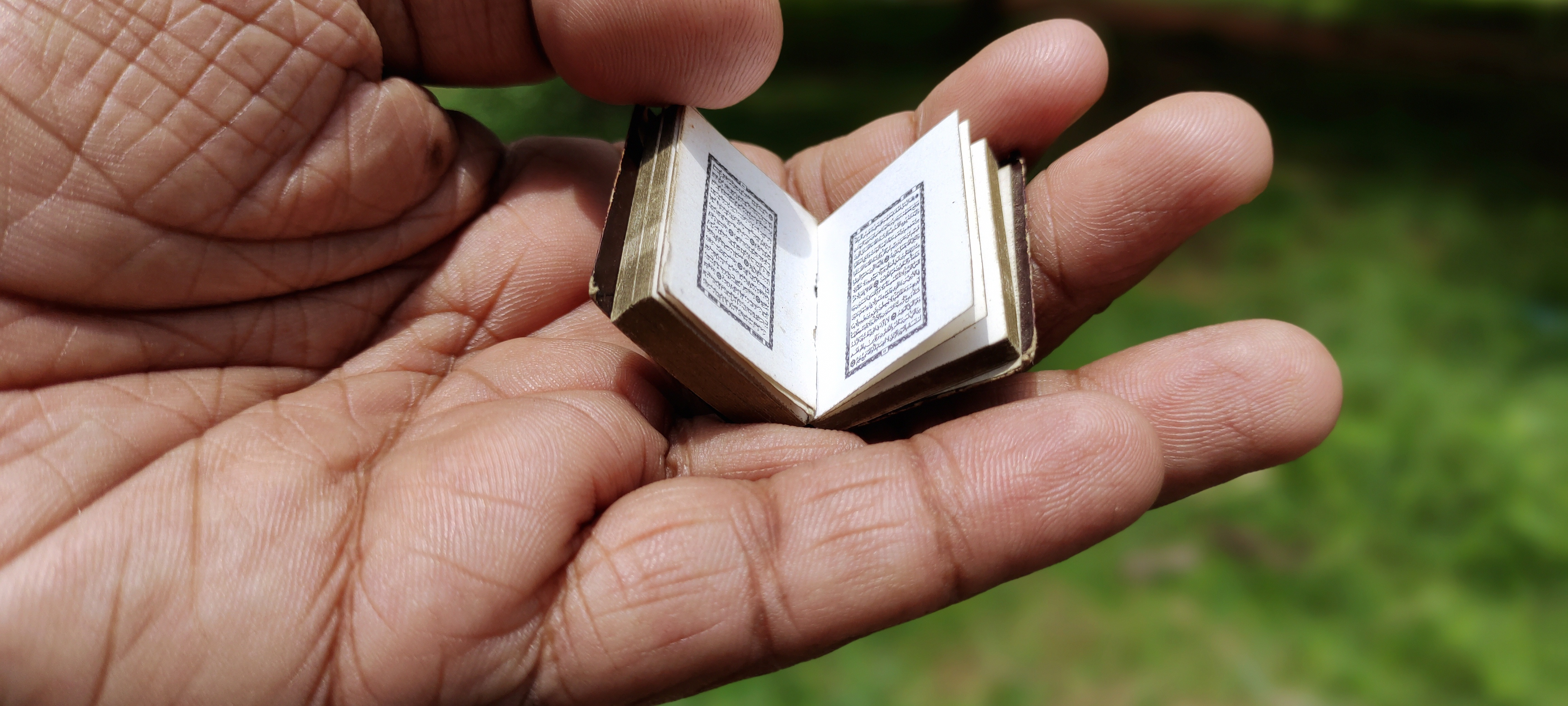
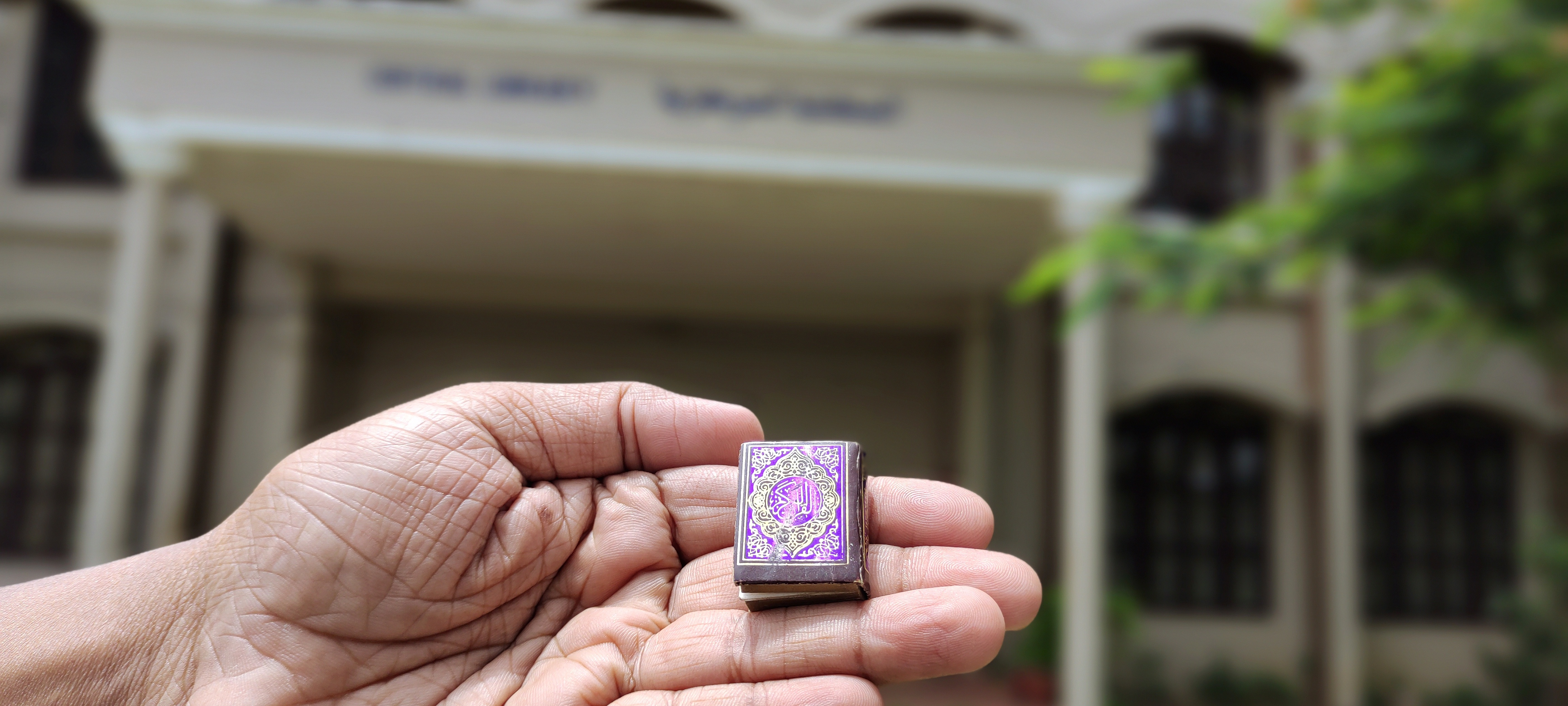
Mini Qur'an from Central library of Al Jamia Al Islamiya Santhapuram, Kerala, India

Thumbnail Quran (Arabic: مُصْحَفٌ مُصَغَّرٌ; Persian: قرآن بندانگشتی) or Miniature Quran are tiny-written Qurans having 2 types: Modern and Antique. Newer versions are produced in China, United Arab Emirates and Iran. But the antique versions can have almost 2 cm length, 1.5 cm width and 1 cm thickness. Some of them in hexagon or octagon shapes and with a metal box and a gilded leather wrapper. Very antique versions have fragile papers may be foxed in contact with air. Many versions date back to the Ottoman Empire era in Turkey, in Egypt dating back possibly to the Khedivate of Egypt, and production of them in England during WWI. Some are also written in different translations, such as Persian.

== History ==
The oldest and completely preserved miniature qur'an is the Qur'ān Arabe 399, known as the "Qur'ān of Charlemagne" (due to the false legend of it being one of the gifts sent by the caliph Harun al-Rashid to Charlemagne, king of the Franks, to seal the Abbasid-Carolingian alliance between 797 and 809 CE), of Arab Abbasid production, it probably dates back to the 9th century, it's currently housed in the French national library, the Arabic diacritics are almost entirely absent; vocalization are in red dots. The verses are not separated and circles shaped signs indicate groups of ten Ayahs. At the top of each Surah the title and the number of verses is found.

The copy was still in the East in the 16th century, where it has been restored. It was brought to France after 1787.

The National Library of Scotland says the production of the traditional manuscripts of mini Qurans is an old tradition but the printing of such books in especially in Egypt is related to the emergence of Photolithography in the 19th century. This library estimates the Istanbul and Delhi printing versions to 1892 and 1899, but the vast spreading of mini books is owed to David Bryce. All printed versions had a metal box and a tiny magnifier giving to the Muslim soldiers fighting for Britain during the World War I. In a lasting work by Thomas Edward Lawrence he says : "Auda told me later in strict confidence that he had bought a miniature Qur'an for one hundred and twenty pounds, thirteen years before, and had not since been wounded … The book was one of the little Glasgow reproductions, costing eighteen pence in England, but the Arabs were too afraid of Auda's deadliness to laugh at his superstition … or to explain to him his bad bargain."

The pages of these books has an empty margin sometimes with east-art drawings and magnifier is needed to read the texts. Some of Iranian soldiers had them during the Iran–Iraq War.

IRIB Hamedan in 2011 introduced a case. Some of them have been sold on eBay too.

In 2012 The Hindu newspaper quoting from Salar Jung Museum talked about an oldest version mini Quran (partly verses) in 3x2cm dimensions with 31 leaves of Parchment in Kufic handwriting belongs to the 9th century.

== See also ==
- Miniature
