= Kuran, Bandar Abbas =

Kuran كوران
- Village
- Location within Iran
- Coordinates: 27°40′24″N 55°24′04″E
- Country: Iran
- Province: Hormozgan
- County: Bandar Abbas
- Bakhsh: Fin
- Rural District: Fin

Population (2006)
  - Total: 293
- Time zone: UTC+3:30 (IRST)
  - Summer (DST): UTC+4:30 (IRDT)

Kuran (Persian: كوران, also Romanized as Kūrān) is a village in Fin Rural District, Fin District, Bandar Abbas County, Hormozgan Province, Iran.

== Demographics ==
At the 2006 census, its population was 293, in 65 families.
