= Blue Quran =

Early Quranic manuscript

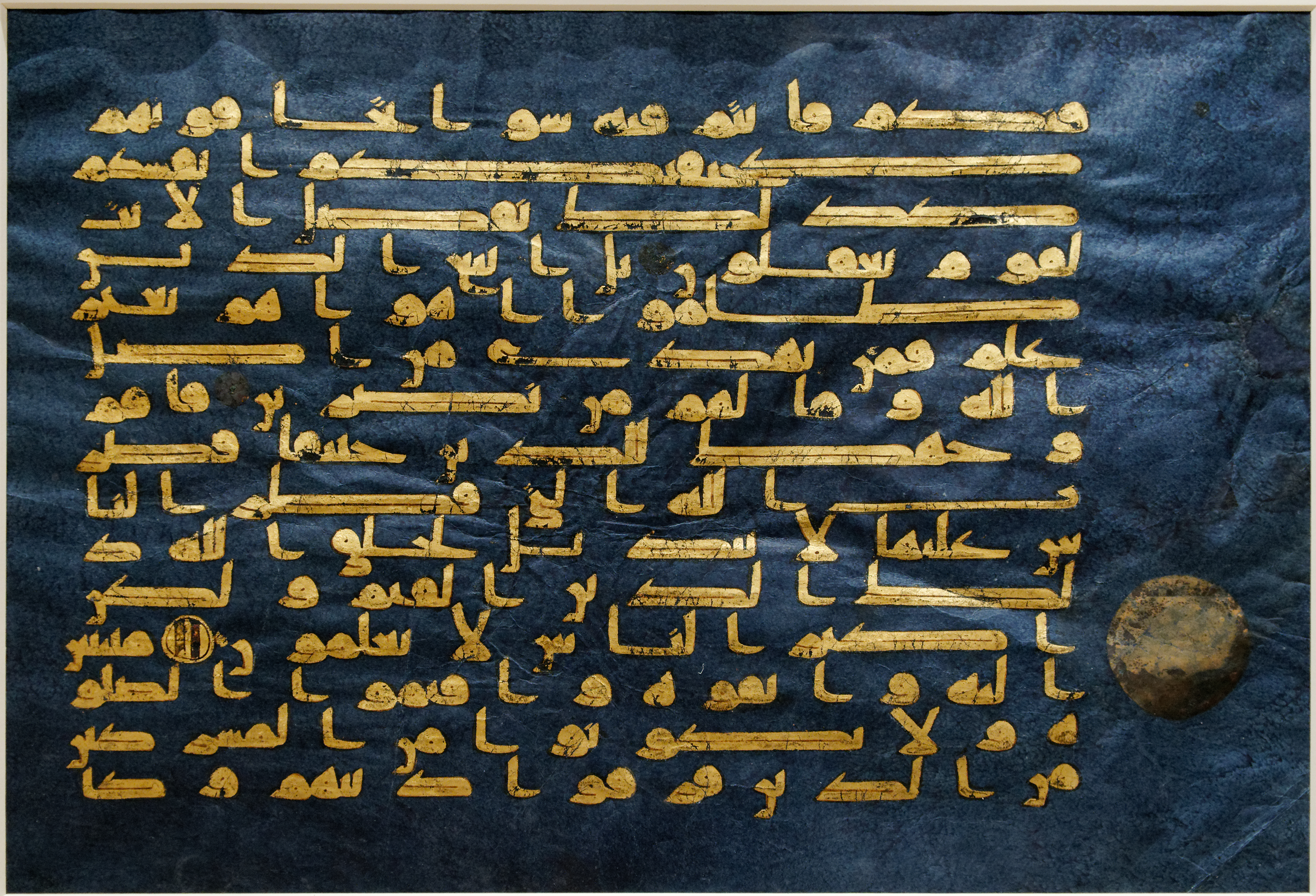
Leaf from the Blue Quran showing Sura 30: 28–32, Metropolitan Museum of Art, New York

The Blue Quran (Arabic: الْمُصْحَف الْأَزْرَق, romanized: al-Muṣḥaf al-′Azraq) is an early Quranic manuscript written in Kufic script. The dating, location of origin, and patron of the Blue Quran are unknown and have been the subject of academic debate. Scholars have proposed that the manuscript was created under the Abbasid, Fatimid, or Umayyad Caliphates, or the Aghlabid or Kalbid dynasties; this would mean it was produced between the 8th and 10th centuries, likely in either the Islamic West (Maghreb or Al-Andalus) or the central Islamic lands of the Middle East. The manuscript is among the most famous works of Islamic calligraphy, notable for its gold lettering on a rare indigo-colored parchment.

== Form ==
The Blue Quran is a large manuscript, with height 11 15/16 inches (30.4 cm) and width 15 13/16 inches (40.2 cm). The codex is arranged with horizontal pages, rather than the vertical format traditionally used for Qurans. Each page contains 15 lines, which is unusual for the period: it was more common for Qurans to have thick margins, few lines, and large spaces between words e.g. the Amajur Quran has three lines per horizontal page.

The manuscript is thought to have initially contained 600 folios. Each is made from sheepskin parchment, which provides a thin page. Given the size and construction of the manuscript, its production required at least 150 sheep. The parchment has a distinctive blue color produced using indigo dye, derived from an indigotin-bearing plant material, either Indian indigo or woad. Due to the similar chemical compositions of all indigo dyes, art historians are unable to determine the source of the blue dye. The dye was likely applied to the parchment using a brush, before it was stretched and dried.

The text is written in right-to-left Kufic script, which is characterized by sharp angles and the absence of vowel markings. There is a perceptible column of letters on the right side of each folio and unconnected letters are split between lines, which are more common features of quranic manuscripts from this period. The gilded lettering was produced by the application of gold leaf over an unidentified adhesive, which could be gum, egg white, fig sap, fish collagen, or a glue byproduct of parchment making. The text was outlined in black or brown, using an iron-tannate ink that was commonly available at the estimated time and place of creation. The ink was used to "tidy up" the feathery edges of the gold leaf. Each sura of text was arranged into groups of twenty verses, with boundaries demarcated using rosettes made from either silver leaf or silver ink. Detailing was added to the verse markers using red paint, derived from either lac or safflower. Several pages have been completely or partly stripped of their golden letters. These erasures seem to go beyond correcting scribal mistakes, as encountered regularly in other quranic manuscripts.

== Origin ==
Map of the Umayyad Caliphate in 750 CE. Mashhad is in Khurasan, west of and equidistant from Merv and Herat.

The exact origin of the Blue Quran is unknown. Scholars have proposed that the manuscript was created under the Abbasid, Fatimid, or Umayyad Caliphates, or the Aghlabid or Kalbid dynasties. Consequently, theories regarding its geographic origin generally assign it to either the Islamic West (Maghreb or Al-Andalus) or the Middle East. The precise dating, location of origin, and patronage of the Blue Quran remain unknown.

One theory is that the Blue Quran was produced in Persia during the Abbasid Caliphate. This was first proposed by Frederik R. Martin, a Swedish diplomat and dealer, who introduced the Blue Quran to the academic community. He claimed that he obtained some of the manuscript's pages in Constantinople and that it originated in Mashhad, Persia, where they were commissioned for the tomb of the 9th-century Abbasid caliph Harun al-Rashid. This is supported by the Persian customs stamp on one of its pages. Additionally, the horizontal layout of the Blue Quran resembles the Qurans created in the early Abbasid period, which would place the manuscript in or around modern day Iraq. These pieces of evidence support the idea that the Blue Quran was created in the Eastern Islamic world.

On the other hand, the Blue Quran was included in the inventory of the Great Mosque of Kairouan, which places the manuscript in Tunisia around 1300 CE. While this does not confirm that the manuscript was created in Tunisia, scholars argue that transporting the Blue Quran in its entirety over a long distance would be unlikely. This supports the idea that the Blue Quran was created in the Western Islamic world.

Additionally, the Blue Quran shares many characteristics, including its deep blue color, with the Bible of Cava, a manuscript created in 812 CE in Umayyad Spain. The physical similarities between the two supports the idea that the Blue Quran originated in Spain around the 9th-century. One theory is that an Umayyad patron commissioned the Blue Quran and that the manuscript was created by Christians, who have a greater tradition of writing their sacred texts on dyed parchment than Muslims. Since the distance between Spain and Tunisia is closer than that of Persia and Tunisia, transporting the Blue Quran would be easier and therefore more likely.

Many museums cannot agree on how to categorize the manuscript, with some, like the Denver Art Museum, categorizing it as Asian Art while acknowledging it may have origins in North Africa.

== Current status ==
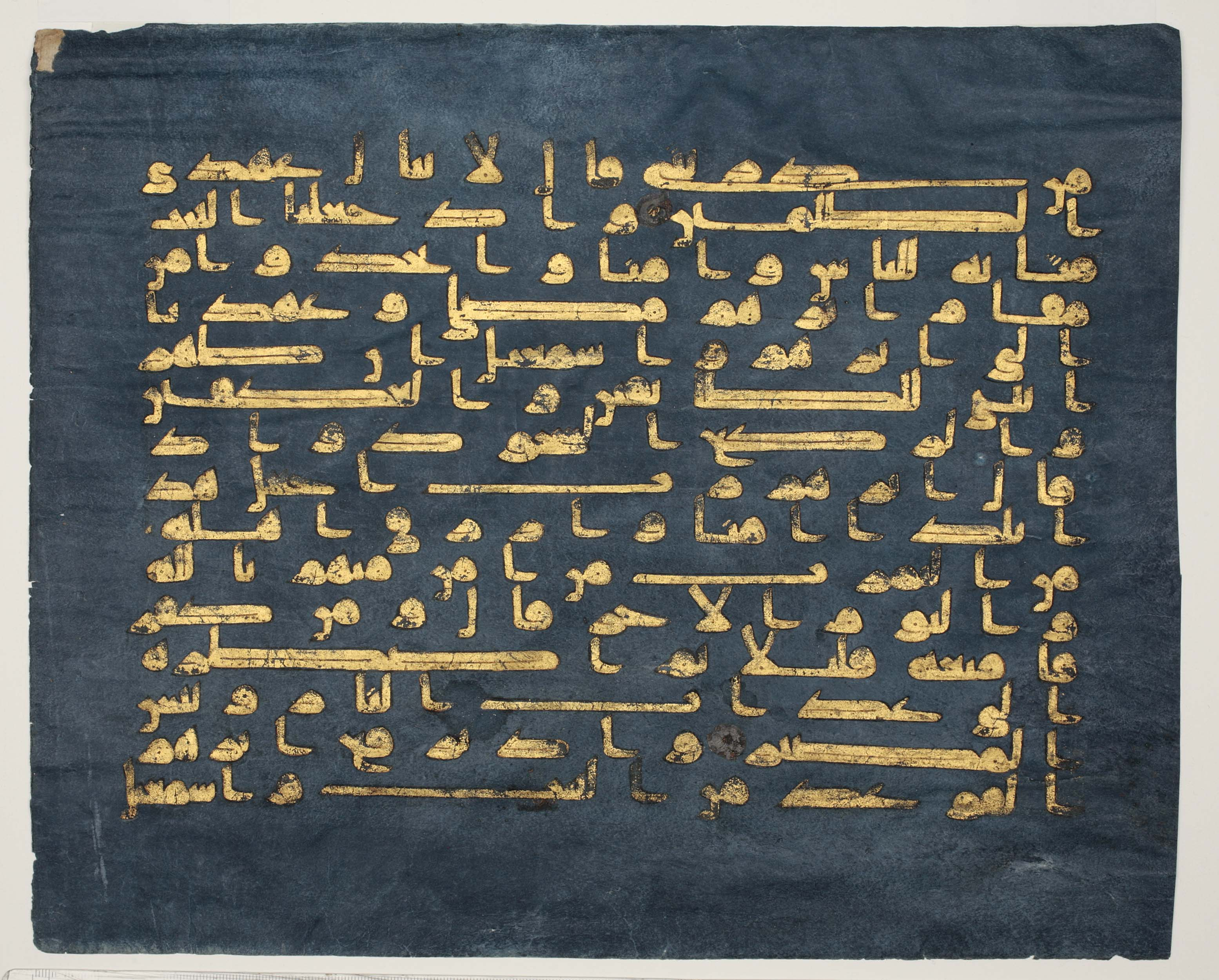
Folio in the Khalili Collection of Islamic Art

The manuscript's approximately 600 folios were separated and dispersed during the Ottoman Empire, though most remained in Kairouan, Tunisia, until the 1950s. It is estimated that about 100 folios remain in museums and private collections. The Raqqada National Museum of Islamic Art near Kairouan has 67 folios. A single folio and a rare bifolium are in the Aga Khan Museum collection. The Museum of Islamic Art, Doha in Qatar has two folios. Two folios are also included in the Khalili Collection of Islamic Art. Other collections include the National Library of Tunisia, the Museum of Fine Arts, the Harvard University Art Museums, and the Metropolitan Museum of Art. The Brooklyn Museum has one folio with part of surat An-Nisa. Several folios were sold at major British auction houses Christie's and Sotheby's in the 2010s, carrying a price of hundreds of thousands of dollars apiece. In 2018, Christie's auctioned one folio for a reported £512,750, over double the low estimate for the lot.

== Significance ==
The Blue Quran is among the most famous Qur'an manuscripts and one of the most famous works of Islamic calligraphy. This work emulated the purple parchment that was used in the Byzantine illuminated manuscripts and was an effort to surpass their rivals in the Byzantine Empire. The Blue Quran was also a display of wealth and power among the Fatimid Dynasty. Art historian Yasser Tabbaa wrote that the "evanescent effect" of the gold lettering on the blue parchment "appears to affirm the Mu'tazili belief in the created and mysterious nature of the Word of God."
