= Abbasid ceramics =

Islamic pottery of the Abbasid Caliphate

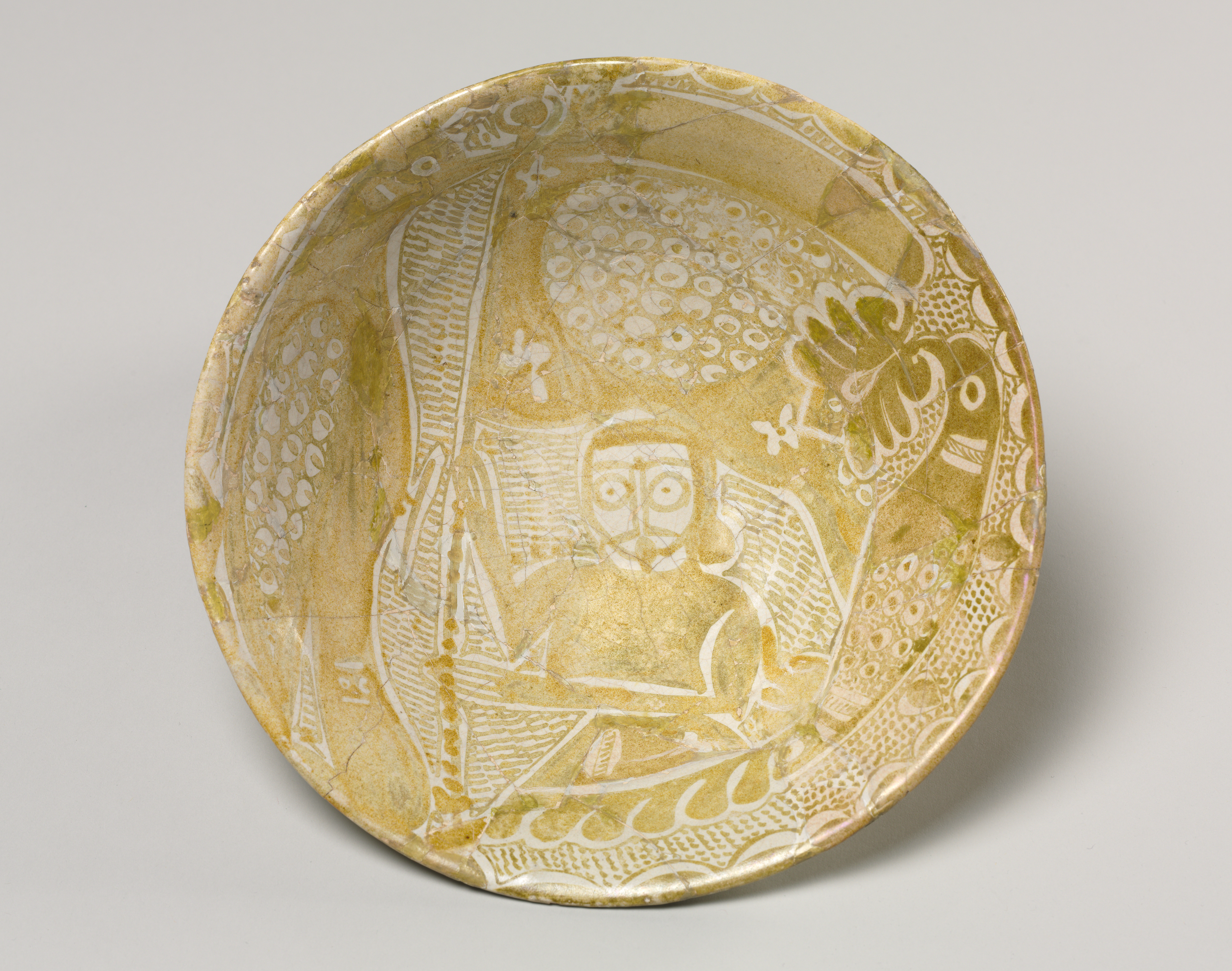
Luster Bowl of Man Holding a Banner with Peacock, Iraq, Abbasid period, 10th Century

Abbasid ceramics or Abbasid pottery is a type of Islamic pottery created in Iraq during the Abbasid Dynasty, especially during the 9th and 10th centuries at the capitals of Baghdad and Samarra. Influenced by imports from the Abbasids’ wide-ranging trade networks and dispersed across the medieval Islamic world, Abbasid pottery is notable for its quality and wide stylistic variety and the development of lusterware techniques.

Due to the Abbasids’ political, cultural and economic importance during this period, they were able to absorb and export a great deal of influence, taking on characteristics and techniques of Coptic and Chinese pottery. Abbasid ceramics were primarily made of clay and glazed with a variety of techniques, including that of lusterware, in order to mimic porcelain and produce a shimmering, multicolored quality. Ornamentation was primarily locally influenced and included a great variety of types of designs, including vegetal and figural imagery, geometric bands, calligraphy, and abstract designs.

== Rise of the Abbasids ==
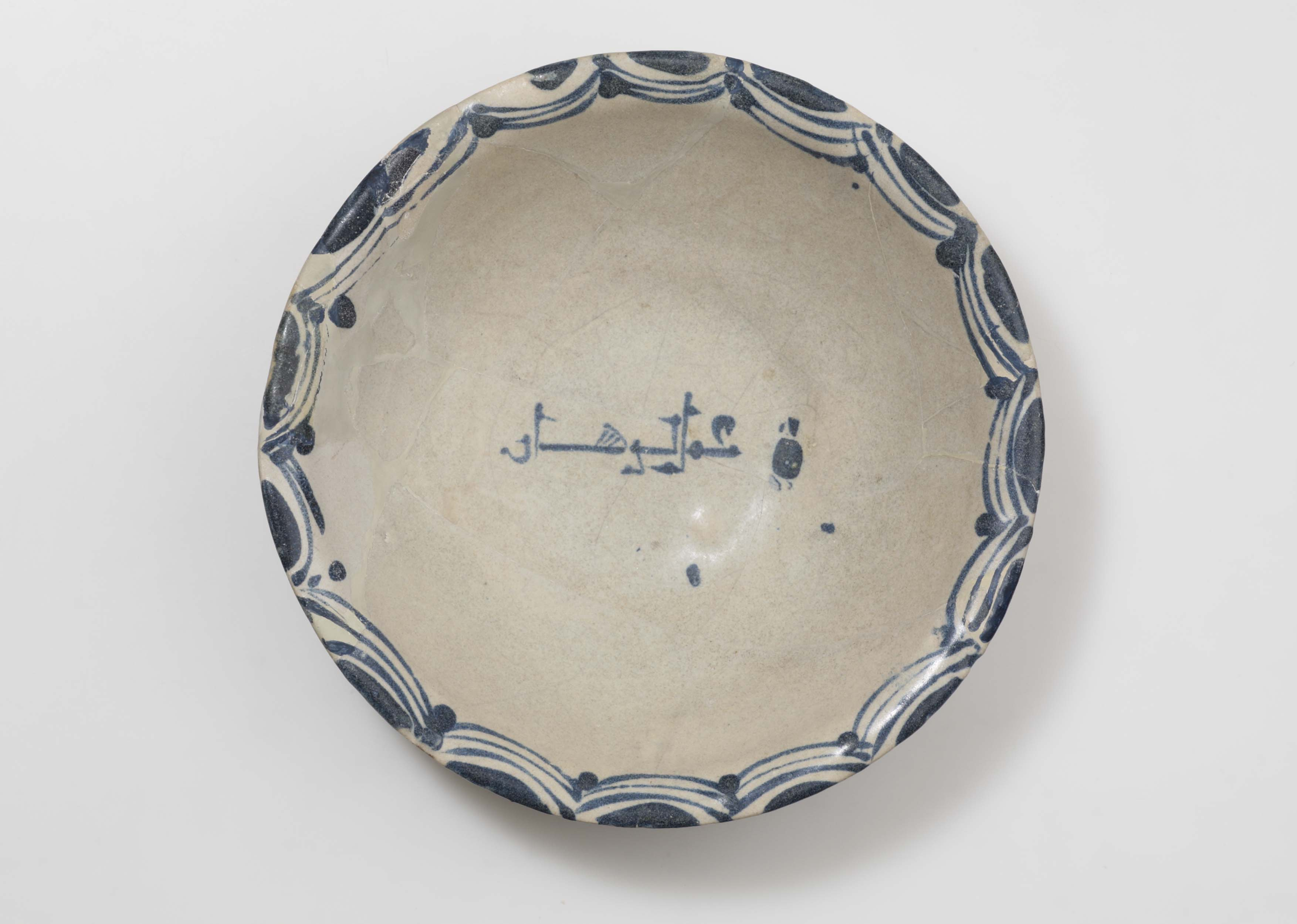
Lusterware Bowl, 9th-10th century, Iraq

The Abbasid Dynasty overthrew the Umayyads and came to power in Iraq in 749CE. They held a great deal of political and cultural power from shortly after their ascendence through the mid-10th century. The Abbasids shifted the capital to Baghdad, a city that became a global hub of trade for both culture and ideas. It was during the height of Abbasid rule, in the 9th and 10th centuries, that their capitals became sites of enormous artistic production, including ceramics and Chinese-inspired lusterware, metalwork and wood. The Abbasid Dynasty was renowned for the House of Wisdom (Bayt al-Hikmah), a center dedicated to the preservation and translation of ancient Persian, Greek, and Indian knowledge into Arabic. This cultural dominance also extended to the world of ceramics, in which Baghdad, and the Abbasids quickly became experts of the craft. Abbasid ceramics have been found at sites around the Islamic world and beyond, and were influenced by a wide range of pottery practices, including Chinese porcelain.

== Coptic and Chinese influence ==
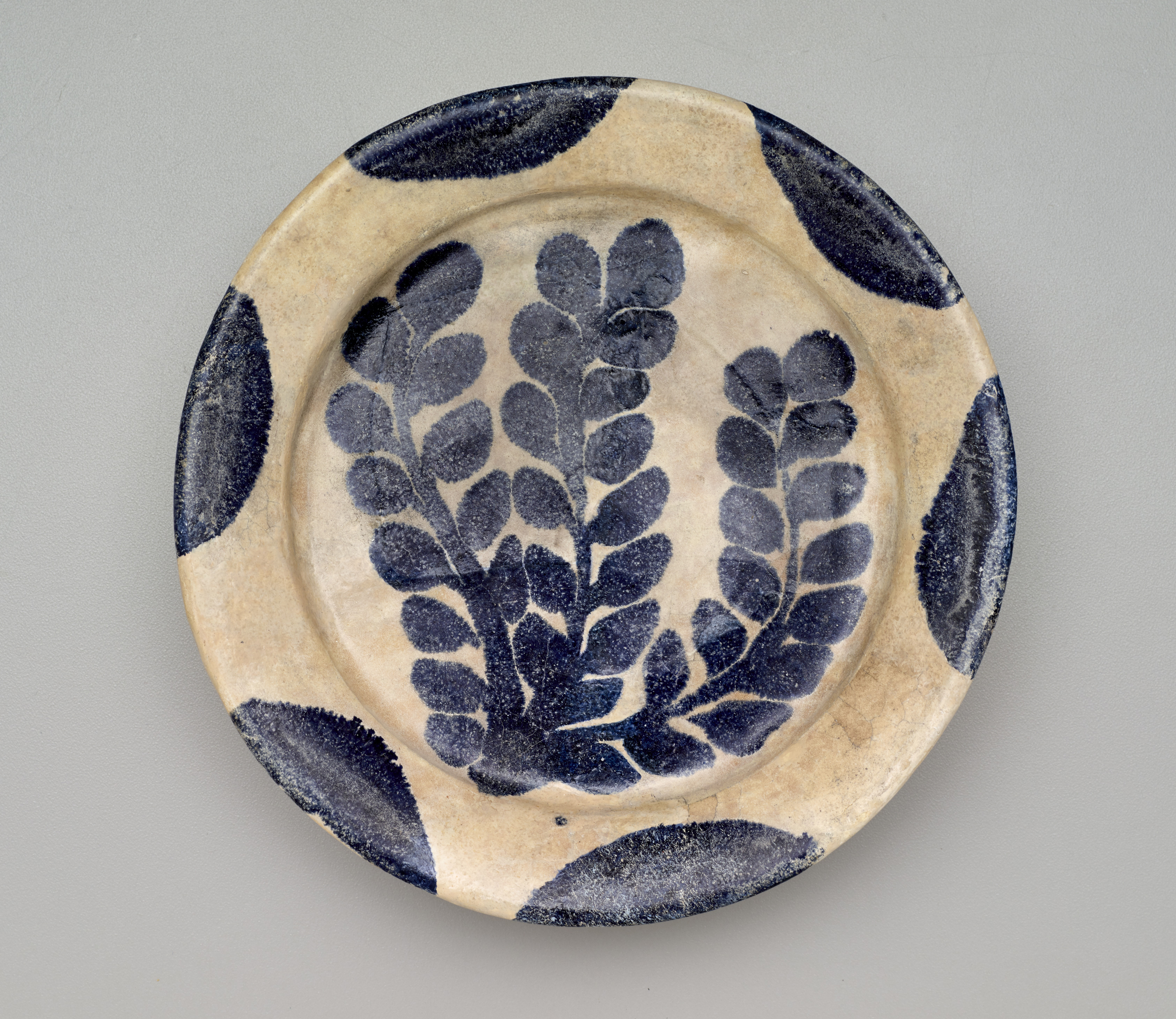
Abbasid bowl made from "Earthenware painted in blue on opaque white glaze." 800-900CE

In the early years of Abbasid rule, a new method of glazing pottery arrived in Iraq, spreading from Egypt where it had originated as “Coptic glazed ware.” The arrival of this technology into an area where pottery had previously only been glazed through a different process with less refined results was likely a response to the substantial market created when Baghdad became the Abbasid capital. In response to the import of porcelain items from China, an initiative that also flourished after this relocation, the new glaze technology was eventually altered to appear white, an innovation that became immensely popular and widespread. This general trajectory has been put forward as a more contemporary alternative to the previous theory, which held that the origin of glazed Abbasid ceramics was initiated exclusively by the import of Chinese ceramic goods.

Although Chinese influence has been delegated a lesser role in initial inspiration, these imported wares certainly affected the shape and detailing of Abbasid pieces. This influence was not however a “one way" phenomenon. There was significant stylistic conversation between the Abbasids and their Chinese neighbors, as there is evidence that they reproduced each other's work using their own materials, leading to chains of copying.

== Production sites and practices ==
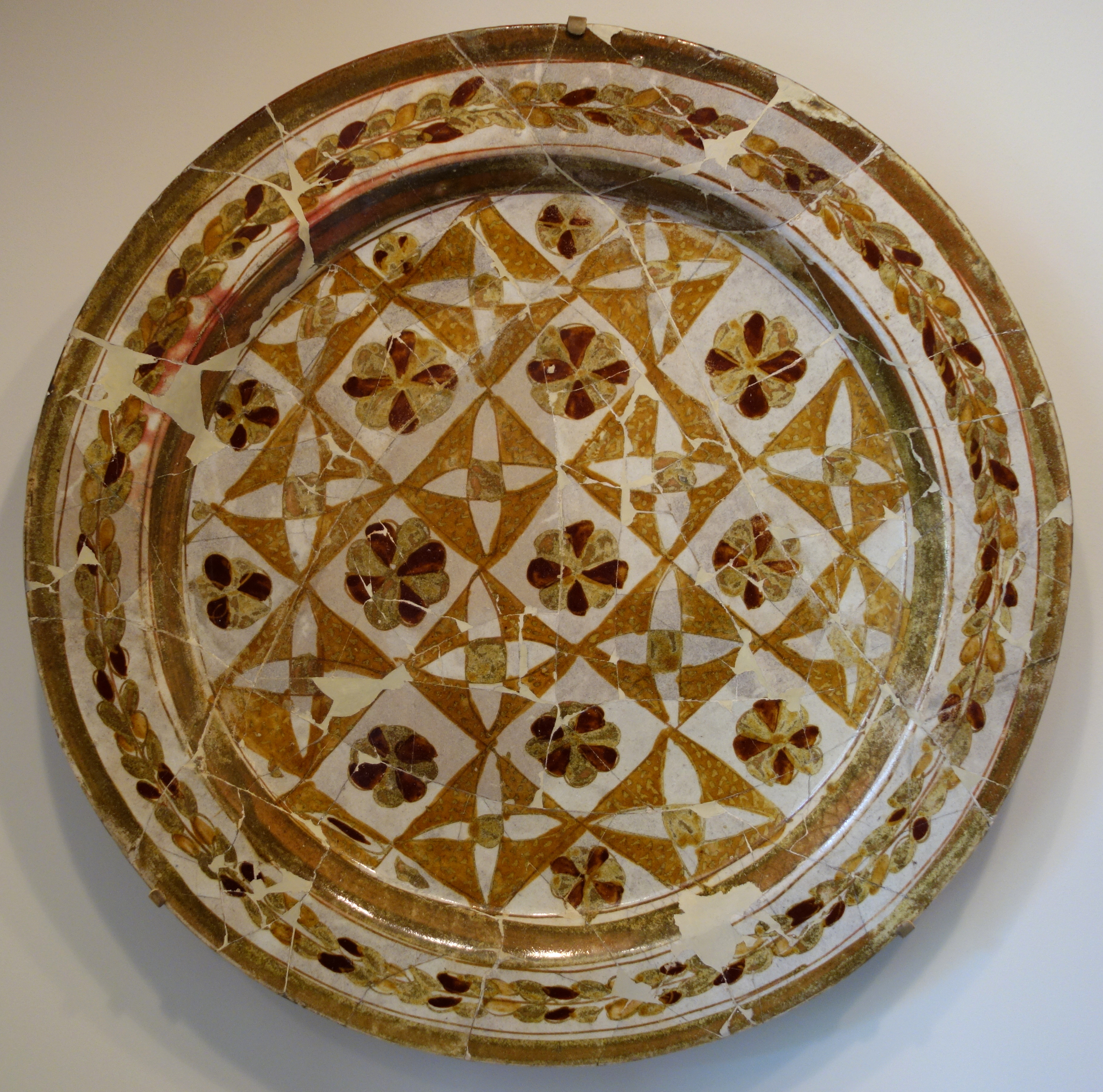
Luster-painted plate with transparent lead glaze, 9th or 10th Century, Iraq

Abbasid ceramics were primarily constructed using a combination of clay and other materials, such as sand, to strengthen the texture and quality. This period of production was heavily characterized by the glaze methods, most notably luster and white-tin based glaze. Since Abbasid potters did not have access to porcelain, the invention of a white tin-based glaze became a popular alternative.

The production of Abbasid lusterware involves two steps: first, the earthenware was coated with an opaque white glaze and fired in a kiln. It was then fired a second time in a reduction kiln, which resulted in a deposit which produced a glossy sheen which mimicked the appearance of porcelain. despite earthenware feeling much coarser since it is not fired to the point of vitrification.

Kiln sites have been found and excavated at the Abbasid cities of Samarra, Susa, and Siraf, with Siraf having the remains of 30 kilns from the 10th century. However, much of the pottery found in Siraf is thought to have been imported from Iraq, including Samarra. Though only one kiln site has been uncovered near Samarra, the great amounts of pottery found around the city has led archaeologists to believe it was a major production site.

== Iconography ==
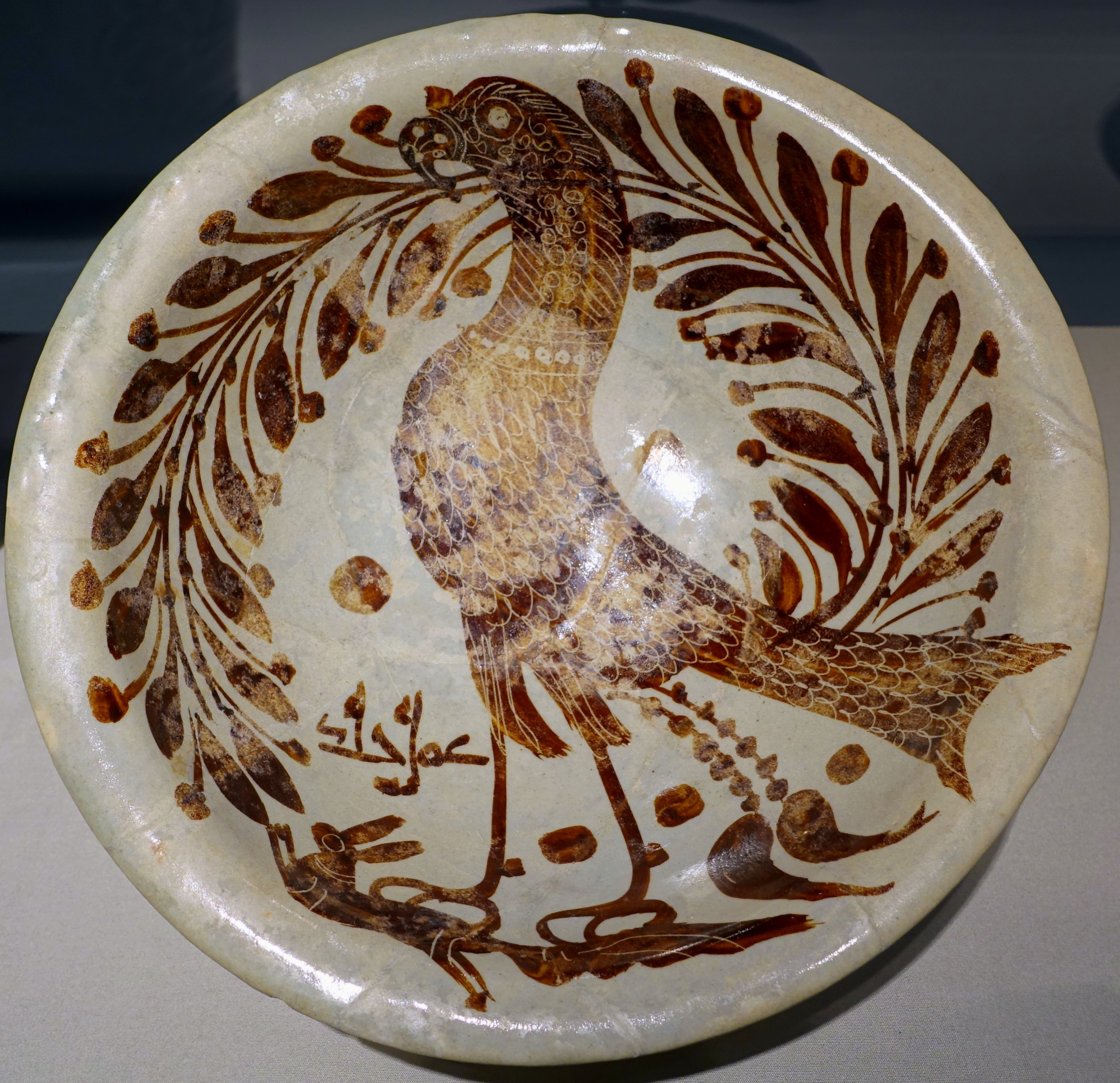
Luster-glazed bowl depicting a bird, 9-10th century, Iraq

The iconography of Abbasid pottery was inspired by Classical Mediterranean and Iranian decorative motifs, including vegetal designs, abstract designs and banded geometric patterns, as well as figural imagery. Inscription was also a common form of decoration, including both religious statements and the signatures of artisans. The development of luster decoration allowed artisans to use iconography in new ways, covering designs in a shimmering overlayer that allowed colors to take on different hues and aspects depending on light. Lusterware was made in polychrome, bi-chrome, and monochrome designs, with monochrome becoming more popular than polychrome over time.

In Samarra, ceramic lusterware tiles were also used in architectural ornamentation, with many of the same iconographic motifs as in pottery, particularly abstracted designs. These tiles may have been used together to form friezes. The use of glazed tiles in architecture became more common in the later Abbasid period, when brightly colored tiles were used to accent more subdued brickwork.
