= Khvorin, Kermanshah =

Khvorin خورين
- Village
- Location within Iran
- Coordinates: 34°53′05″N 46°05′49″E
- Country: Iran
- Province: Kermanshah
- County: Salas-e Babajani
- Bakhsh: Central
- Rural District: Dasht-e Hor

Population (2006)
  - Total: 18
- Time zone: UTC+3:30 (IRST)
  - Summer (DST): UTC+4:30 (IRDT)

Khvorin (Persian: خورين, also Romanized as Khvorīn; also known as Khūrneyn and Khvoran) is a village in Dasht-e Hor Rural District, in the Central District of Salas-e Babajani County, Kermanshah Province, Iran. At the 2006 census, its population was 18, in 4 families.
