= Kuroń =

Kuroń is a Polish surname. Notable people with the surname include:

- Danuta Kuroń (born 1949), Polish activist
- Jacek Kuroń (1934–2004), Polish politician, Danuta's husband
- Maciej Kuroń (1960–2008), Polish chef and journalist, Jacek's son
