= Quran =

Central religious text of Islam

- الْقُرْآن al-Qurʾān
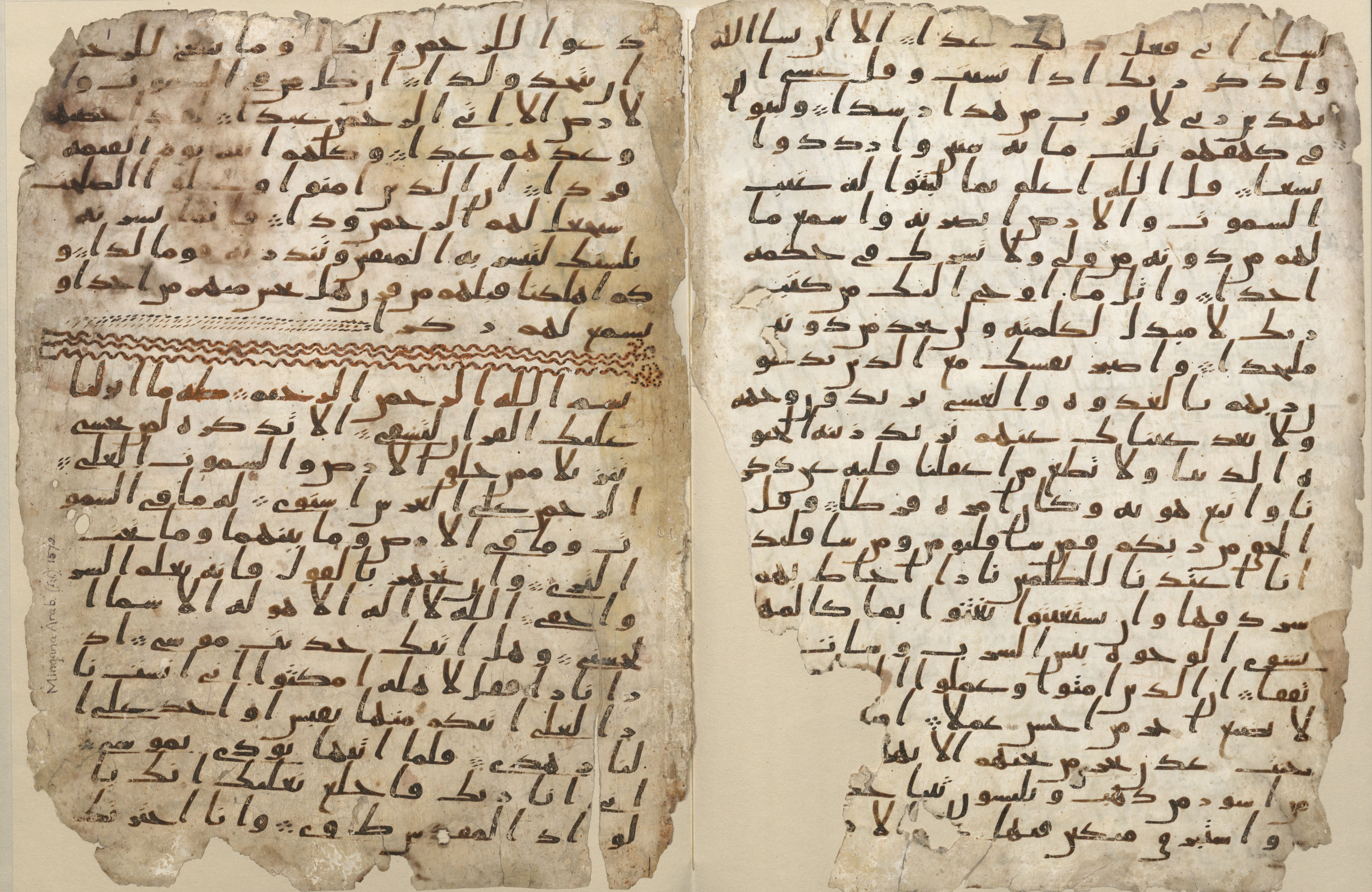
- Two folios of the Birmingham Quran manuscript, an early manuscript written in Hijazi script on parchment carbon-dated to c. 568–645, overlapping with Muhammad's lifetime

Information
- Religion: Islam
- Language: Classical Arabic
- Period: 610–632 CE
- Chapters: 114 (list); See sūrah
- Verses: 6,348 (including the basmala); 6,236 (excluding the basmala); See Āyah

Full text
- Quran at Arabic Wikisource
- Quran at English Wikisource

The Quran (Note: /kʊˈrɑːn/, kuurr-AHN; the English pronunciation varies: /kəˈrɑːn/, /-ˈræn/, especially Koran/Coran /kɔː-/, /koʊ-/; especially with the spelling quran /kʊˈrɑːn/, /-ˈræn/; including British English /kɒˈrɑːn/.) (Arabic: الْقُرْآن, (Note: Quranic Arabic: الۡقُرۡءَان, al-Qurʾān) (Note: Arabic pronunciation: [alqurˈʔaːn]. The Arabic pronunciation can be transcribed phonemically as /al.qurˈʔaːn/. The actual pronunciation in Literary Arabic varies regionally. The first vowel varies from [o] to [ʊ], while the second vowel varies from higher and advanced [æ] ~ [a] to lower and retracted [ɑ]. For example, the pronunciation in Egypt is [qorˈʔɑːn] and in Central East Arabia [qʊrˈʔæːn].) lit. 'the recitation' or 'the lecture'), also romanized Qur'an or Koran, (Note: (English spelling) The form Alcoran (and its variants) was usual before the 19th century when it became obsolete. The form Koran was most predominant from the second half of the 18th century until the 1980s, when it has been superseded by either Qur'an or Quran. Other transliterations include al-Coran, Coran, Kuran and al-Qur'an. The adjectives vary as well and include Koranic, Quranic and Qur'anic (sometimes in lowercase).) is the central religious text of Islam, and is believed by Muslims to be a revelation directly from God (Allāh). It is organized in 114 chapters (sūrah, pl. suwar) which consist of individual verses (āyah). Aside from its religious significance, it is widely regarded as the finest work in Arabic literature and has significantly influenced the Arabic language.

Muslims believe the Quran was orally revealed by God to the final Islamic prophet Muhammad through the angel Gabriel incrementally over a period of some 23 years, beginning on the Laylat al-Qadr when Muhammad was 40 and concluding in 11 AH/632 CE, the year of his death. Muslims regard the Quran as Muhammad's most important miracle, a proof of his prophethood, and the culmination of a series of divine messages starting with those revealed to the first Islamic prophet Adam, including the holy books of the Torah, Psalms, and Gospel in Islam. The Quran is believed by Muslims to be God's own divine speech providing a complete code of conduct across all facets of life. This has led Muslim theologians to fiercely debate whether the Quran was "created or uncreated". According to tradition, several of Muhammad's companions served as scribes, recording the revelations. Shortly after Muhammad's death, the Quran was compiled on the order of the first caliph Abu Bakr (r. 632–634) by the companions, who had written down or memorized parts of it. Caliph Uthman (r. 644–656) established a standard version, now known as the Uthmanic codex, which is generally considered the archetype of the Quran known today. There are, however, canonical variant readings (qirāʾāt), transmitted through oral tradition, with minor variations in wording and nuance that may lead to subtle differences in meaning, while preserving the core message of the Quran. It is the subject of a modern field of academic research known as Quranic studies. Some argue that manuscript evidence, textual variants (such as the Sanaa manuscript), and historical sources suggest a more gradual and complex process of compilation and canonization.

The Quran describes itself as a guide for humanity (2:185). It alludes to significant narratives found in biblical and apocryphal texts. While it devotes considerable space to some of these narratives, it does not quote any paragraph from these sources directly, but summarizes and uses different versions of some in different sections. Islamic theorists tend to explain this situation as the Quran's focus on the moral lessons to be drawn from events. This allusive style and summarization entail many explanatory efforts (exegesis). To extrapolate the meaning of a particular Quranic verse, Muslims rely on tafsir, or commentary, often in conjunction with translations of the text. Furthermore, hadiths, which are valued in most Islamic schools of thought for their role in establishing Islamic laws and regulations, are oral traditions that were later written down and are believed to reflect the words and actions of Muhammad, serving as additional guidance alongside the Quran for most Muslims. During prayers, the Quran is recited only in Arabic. A person who has memorized the entire Quran is called a hafiz (female hafiza). Ideally, verses are recited with a special kind of prosody reserved for this purpose called tajwid. It is a tradition for some Muslims to recite the entire Quran during the tarawih prayers throughout the month of Ramadan.

== Etymology and meaning ==
The word qur'ān appears about 70 times in the Qur'an itself, assuming various meanings. It is a verbal noun (maṣdar) of the Arabic verb qara'a (قرأ) meaning 'he read' or 'he recited'. The Syriac equivalent is qeryānā (ܩܪܝܢܐ), which refers to 'scripture reading' or 'lesson'. While some Western scholars consider the word to be derived from the Syriac, the majority of Muslim authorities hold the origin of the word is qara'a itself. Regardless, it had become an Arabic term by Muhammad's lifetime. An important meaning of the word is the 'act of reciting', as reflected in an early Quranic passage: "It is for Us to collect it and to recite it (qur'ānahu)."

In other verses, the word refers to 'an individual passage recited [by Muhammad]'. Its liturgical context is seen in a number of passages, for example: "So when al-qur'ān is recited, listen to it and keep silent." The word may also assume the meaning of a codified scripture when mentioned with other scriptures such as the Torah and Gospel.

The term also has closely related synonyms that are employed throughout the Quran. Each synonym possesses its own distinct meaning, but its use may converge with that of qur'ān in certain contexts. Such terms include kitāb ('book'), āyah ('sign'), and sūrah ('scripture'); the latter two terms also denote units of revelation. In the large majority of contexts, usually with a definite article (al-), the word is referred to as the waḥy ('revelation'), that which has been "sent down" (tanzīl) at intervals. Other related words include: dhikr ('remembrance'), used to refer to the Quran in the sense of a reminder and warning; and ḥikmah ('wisdom'), sometimes referring to the revelation or part of it. (Note: According to Welch in the Encyclopedia of Islam, the verses pertaining to the usage of the word hikma should probably be interpreted in the light of IV, 105, where it is said that "Muhammad is to judge (tahkum) mankind on the basis of the Book sent down to him.")

The Quran describes itself as 'the discernment' (al-furqān), 'the mother book' (umm al-kitāb), 'the guide' (huda), 'the wisdom' (hikmah), 'the remembrance' (dhikr), and 'the revelation' (tanzīl; 'something sent down', signifying the descent of an object from a higher place to lower place). Another term is al-kitāb ('The Book'), though it is also used in the Arabic language for other scriptures, such as the Torah and the Gospels. The term mus'haf ('written work') is often used to refer to particular Quranic manuscripts but is also used in the Quran to identify earlier revealed books.

== History ==
=== Traditional sources ===
==== Prophetic era ====
Islamic tradition relates that Muhammad received his first revelation in 610 CE in the Cave of Hira on the Laylat al-Qadr during one of his isolated retreats to the mountains. Thereafter, he received revelations over a period of 23 years. The final verse of the Quran was revealed on the 18th of the Islamic month of Dhu al-Hijjah in the year 10 A.H., a date that roughly corresponds to February or March 632.

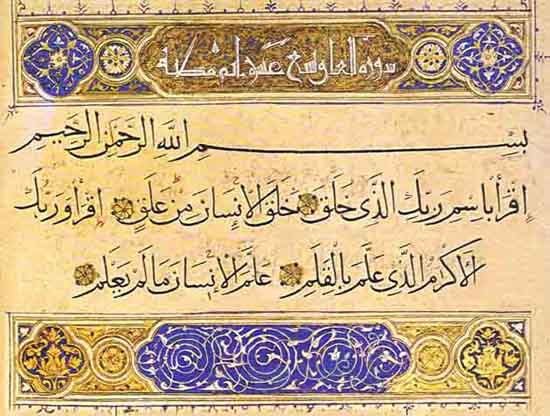
Believed to be Muhammad's first revelation, Sura Al-Alaq, placed 96th in the later Quranic regulations. Translations of "al-‘alaq" shed light on how the meanings attributed to the text have evolved; While classical exegeses interpret the word as a "clinging clot," modern approaches translate it as "embryo," and in the philological analyses of C. Luxenberg, its meaning was "stickiness," referring to the clay mentioned in the Genesis creation narrative.

Sahih al-Bukhari narrates Muhammad describing the revelations as, "Sometimes it is (wahy) like the ringing of a bell" and A'isha reported, "I saw the Prophet being inspired Divinely on a very cold day and noticed the sweat dropping from his forehead (as the Inspiration was over)." (Note: "God's Apostle replied, 'Sometimes it is (revealed) like the ringing of a bell, this form of Inspiration is the hardest of all and then this state passes off after I have grasped what is inspired. Sometimes the Angel comes in the form of a man and talks to me and I grasp whatever he says.' ʻAisha added: Verily I saw the Prophet being inspired Divinely on a very cold day and noticed the Sweat dropping from his forehead.") "A strong person had taught him". Also expressions like "grew clear to view when he was on the uppermost horizon. Then he drew nigh and came down till he was (distant) two bows' length or even nearer" in the Quran are also linked to the angel of revelation in traditional interpretations. The Islamic studies scholar Welch states in the Encyclopaedia of Islam that, these seizures would have been seen by those around him as convincing evidence for the superhuman origin of Muhammad's inspirations. However, Muhammad's critics accused him of being a possessed man, a soothsayer, or a magician since his experiences were similar to those claimed by such figures well known in ancient Arabia.

The revelations traditionally classified as "Meccan" constitute two-thirds of the Quran. It is stated that these revelations were transmitted orally during this period, and then recorded in the years leading up to the Hijrah, a period referred to as the Medinan period (622–632). The Meccan period is known for relying on an oral tradition —including narratives related to the Quran— that is generally considered to have undergone a degree of textual evolution alongside other religious narratives. The poetic style and frequently repetitive composition of the Quran as we know it today are seen as a consequence of the traditional oral communication method of this period. It is thought that the Qur'an began to be written down towards the end of the Meccan period. According to tradition, some of the Quraysh captives taken in the Battle of Badr were given the opportunity to be freed after teaching the Muslims the simple script of that time, and a group of Muslims became literate. Initially transmitted orally, the Qur'an began to be recorded on tablets, bones, and the broad, flat ends of palm tree leaves. Most of suras were in use amongst early Muslims since they are mentioned in numerous sayings by both Sunni and Shia sources, relating Muhammad's use of the Quran as a call to Islam, the making of prayer and the manner of recitation. However, the Quran did not exist in book form at the time of Muhammad's death in 632 at age 61–62. There is agreement among scholars that Muhammad himself did not write down the revelation because of the Quranic description on Muhammad as "ummi". (Note: Traditionally interpreted as 'illiterate', but the meaning is more complex. Medieval commentators such as al-Tabari (d. 923) maintained that the term induced two meanings: first, the inability to read or write in general; second, the inexperience or ignorance of the previous books or scriptures (but they gave priority to the first meaning). Muhammad's illiteracy was taken as a sign of the genuineness of his prophethood. For example, according to Fakhr al-Din al-Razi, if Muhammad had mastered writing and reading he possibly would have been suspected of having studied the books of the ancestors. Some scholars such as W. Montgomery Watt prefer the second meaning of ummi—they take it to indicate unfamiliarity with earlier sacred texts.)

==== Compilation and preservation ====
According to tradition, after the death of Muhammad in 632, when many of his companions who had memorized the Qur'an were killed by Musaylima in the Battle of al-Yamama, the first caliph Abu Bakr (632-634) decided to compile the book into a single volume for its preservation and appointed Zayd ibn Thabit (d. 655) for this task, as he was "the person who wrote down the divine revelation for the Messenger of Allah." Zayd's difficulties in collecting the Quranic material from parchments, palm-leaf stalks, thin stones and from men who knew it by heart is recorded in narratives along with a group of friends, and created a draft of the entire book, which he then presented to Abu Bakr. Upon Abu Bakr's death in 644, the Mushaf was given to Muhammad's widow, Hafsa bint Umar, and remained with her until the third caliph, Uthman (reign 644-656), requested a standard copy from her.

Around the 650s, the spread of Islam beyond the Arabian Peninsula to Persia, the Levant, and North Africa, and the establishment of large military garrisons, necessitated the co-existence, integration, and communal worship of soldiers from different tribes. During this time, conflicts arose among the soldiers due to differing readings of the Quran, presented by Islamic scholars as the use of seven syllables (ahruf), and this was reported to Uthman, who requested a solution. Thus, in order to preserve the Holy text, he ordered a committee headed by Zayd to prepare a standard text known as the Uthmanic codex, and copies to be sent to various city centers. It is also believed that other versions (or private codices) of the Qur'an were collected and destroyed on Uthman's orders. According to historian Michael Cook, early Muslim accounts of the collection and compilation of the Qur'an sometimes contradict themselves. Current version of the Quranic text is accepted by Muslim scholars -as the Qurayshi version- compiled by Abu Bakr, (Note: "Few have failed to be convinced that … the Quran is … the words of Muhammad, perhaps even dictated by him after their recitation." There is some disagreement among early Muslim sources disagree over who was the first to collect the narrations. At least one source credits Salim, the freed slave of Abu Hudhaifah with collecting the Quran into a mushaf: "It is reported... from Ibn Buraidah who said: The first of those to collect the Qur'an into a mushaf (codex) was Salim, the freed slave of Abu Hudhaifah.) and codified by Uthman; the Quran, which is not a book structured according to the order of revelation received by Muhammad, has its present coherence and sequential order debated, with some claiming it was achieved through divine revelation during Muhammad's time, while others suggest it was accomplished through an ijtihad (legal reasoning) decision by Uthman's committee.

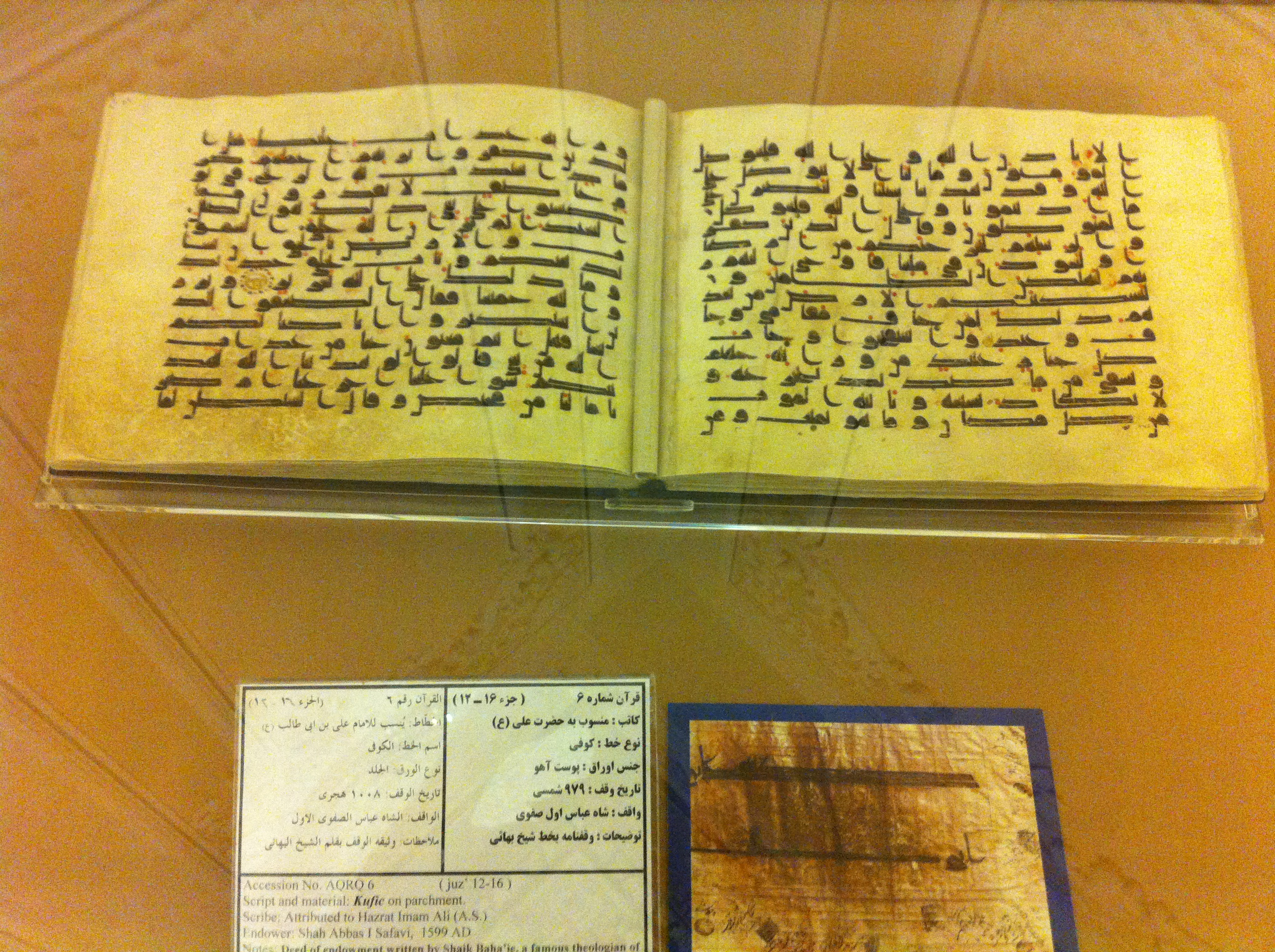
Handwritten Quran attributed to Ali, written in Kufic script on parchment made from deer skin, and endowed by Safavid king Abbas the Great. Preserved at the Astan Quds Razavi Central Museum in Mashhad, Iran.

The mentioned ahruf (lit. ' letter'), persistently emphasized as being different from the Qira'at, which today refers to the different pronunciations of the Quranic rasm, are a debated and somewhat concealed topic. According to some accounts, when Uthman compiled his official codex, he based the writing on the Qurayshi dialect and eliminated other codices (Note: According to some researchers like John Wansbrough and Yehuda D. Nevo, later known as the Revisionist school of Islamic studies, the canonization of the Quran, through the unification of "various previous texts" into a single, unchanging standard text and the elimination of others, took place over a period of approximately 200 years. They argued that a common method within Islamic tradition was to legitimize a practice by attributing it to a past authority that enjoyed high popular acceptance.) gathered from different regions, and therefore expected to have different local dialects. This suggests that the relevant accounts may actually point to a single issue encompassing different codices (variants). While ahruf, were initially scorned and criticized as man-made, five centuries later they were sanctified by being linked to a divine source. None of the variant copies of the Quran attributed to individuals such as Abdullah ibn Masud, Ubayy ibn Ka'b, and Abu Musa al-Ash'ari, some of whom are said to have lived as far back as the 11th century, exist today. Shia had more than 1,000 hadiths ascribed to the Shia Imams which indicate the distortion of the Quran and according to Etan Kohlberg, this belief about Quran was common among Shiites in the early centuries of Islam. Alleged distortions have been carried out to remove any references to the rights of Ali, the Imams and their supporters and the disapproval of enemies, such as Umayyads and Abbasids. (Note: Ibn Babawayh was the first major Twelver author "to adopt a position identical to that of the Sunnis" and the change was a result of the "rise to power of the Sunni 'Abbasid caliphate," whence belief in the corruption of the Quran became untenable vis-a-vis the position of Sunni "orthodoxy".)

Today, the branch of study that delves deeply into the various readings, different narrations, and schools of readings of the Quran is referred to as "Ilm-al Qira'a", and according to some hadiths, dates back to the time of Muhammad. (See: ten canonical recitations) Today's shias recite the Quran according to the qira'at of Hafs on authority of 'Asim, which is the prevalent qira'at in the Islamic world and expresses that the Quran was gathered and compiled by Muhammad during his lifetime. The modern Qur'an contains numerous commands ("ql" meaning "say") which give it the image of a divine word addressed directly to Muhammad. Michael Cook offers an explanation of this phenomenon through qira'a; in the original texts (Rasm) there was no distinction between "say" or "he said". However, later texts standardized the expression "ql" (which can be read as both "he said" and "say") in these texts to be read as "say" in many places.

=== Modern scholarship ===
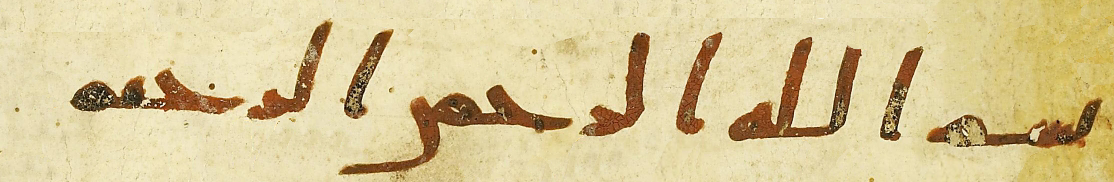
The skeletal Arabic script of "ٮسم الله الرحمں الرحىم" Basmala that appears in the Birmingham manuscript —which consists of two parchment leaves— has been subjected to radiocarbon dating, pointing to a timeframe between 568 and 645 CE; From a historical and codicological perspective, this fragment is merely one of the surviving folios of the Codex Parisino-petropolitanus; a text that allows for the reconstruction of approximately 45% of the Quranic text as it existed between the late 7th and early 8th centuries.

Quranic studies is the academic study of the Quran. The field uses and applies a diverse set of disciplines and methods, such as philology, textual criticism, lexicography, codicology, literary criticism, comparative religion, and historical criticism. Studies on the Quran rarely went beyond textual criticism and have not produced a critical text that could form the basis for a scientific reconstruction of the Quranic text. (Note: For both the claim that variant readings are still transmitted and the claim that no such critical edition has been produced, see Gilliot, C., "Creation of a fixed text")

In 1972, in a mosque in the city of Sanaa, Yemen, manuscripts "consisting of 12,000 pieces" were discovered that were later proven to be the oldest (Note: Studies using radiocarbon dating indicate that the parchments are dated to the period before 671 CE with a 99 percent probability.) Quranic text known to exist at the time. The Sanaa manuscripts contain palimpsests, manuscript pages from which the text has been washed off to make the parchment reusable again. However, the faint washed-off underlying text (scriptio inferior) is still barely visible. The German scholar Gerd R. Puin has been investigating these Quran fragments for years. His research team made 35,000 microfilm photographs of the manuscripts, which he dated to the early part of the 8th century. Puin has noted unconventional and different verse orderings, minor textual variations, and rare styles of orthography, and suggested that some of the parchments were palimpsests which had been reused. Puin believed that this implied an evolving text as opposed to a fixed one.

Until the early 1970s, non-Muslim Islamic scholars generally accepted the traditional narrative—excluding the divine source—in its entirety. These explanations did not satisfy a new generation of researchers; some Western scholars question the accuracy of the traditional accounts on whether the holy book existed in any form before the last decade of the seventh century (Patricia Crone and Michael Cook); and/or argue it is a "cocktail of texts", some of which may have been existent a hundred years before Muhammad, that evolved (Gerd R. Puin), or was redacted (J. Wansbrough), to form the Quran. After the creation of this standardized "canonical" text, the earlier texts were suppressed, and all existing manuscripts—despite their numerous variants—appear to date from a time after the creation of this text. According to some researchers like John Wansbrough and Yehuda D. Nevo, later tagged as the critical historians of Islam, the canonization of the Quran, through the unification of "various previous texts" into a single, unchanging standard text and the elimination of others, took place over a period of approximately 200 years. (Note: Ibn Babawayh was the first major Twelver author "to adopt a position identical to that of the Sunnis" and the change was a result of the "rise to power of the Sunni 'Abbasid caliphate," whence belief in the corruption of the Quran became untenable vis-a-vis the position of Sunni "orthodoxy".) They argued that a common method within Islamic tradition was to legitimize a practice by attributing it to a past authority that enjoyed high popular acceptance. Although most of the different versions/readings of the Quranic text are no longer transmitted, some still are.

Numerous researchers have observed that there has never been a critical text of the Quran, that is based on manuscript evidence, that checks for accuracy of transmission. The current text of the Qurʾan that is widely used relies on one traditional variant called the ʿUthmānic recension and the lack of rigorous analysis is seen as a deficiency compared to other texts like the Old and New Testament that have been well studied for a few centuries and properly reconstructed. The general consensus among experts is that reconstructions using the oldest manuscripts should be the basis of any claims to accuracy of Quranic preservation, not traditions. Critical editions are standard procedure in the reconstruction of any secular or religious text copied by hand to reliably recover a plausible original that is close to an author's intention with introductions and annotations for proper context.

==== Textual Standardization ====
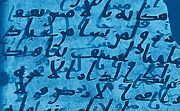
A page from the Sanaa manuscript. Possibly the oldest, best preserved and most comprehensive Islamic archaeological document to date. The double layer reveals additions to the original text and multiple differences with today's Quran.

Contemporary scholars hold diverse views on the formation, compilation, and development of the Quran from oral recitations to a written work. Scholars generally acknowledge that the existence of numerous collections of variants, some of which are significant (e.g. with different words), that survive even today, complicate the notion of a "traditional" Uthmanic text. The 1924 Cairo Arabic edition of the Quran is main version used today and follows the reading of Kufan asim b. Bahdala, while other Arabic variant versions are usually ignored. In North Africa (excluding Egypt), the Warsh version of the arabic Quran is used.

Among the earliest Quranic manuscripts, the Sana'a manuscript has revealed numerous remarkable textual variants, as well as between the subtext and the standard 1924 Cairo edition. Some accounts suggest the existence of at least four different Qurans with significant differences, written by Ubayy ibn Ka'b, Abd Allah ibn Mas'ud, Abu Musa al-Ash'ari, and Miqdad ibn Aswad, were commonly used in the early period and presented in tradition as "the companions of Muhammad." These "significant differences" between the texts demonstrate that a "synoptic problem" similar to the Gospels in Christianity, whereby different sources depend on other sources, also applies to the Quran. For example, the Quran displays combination of variants internally such as Surah 55:46–60 vs Surah 55:62-76 with repetitions placed in parallel from possibly two variants and also in Surah 26.176–90 & Surah 29.36–37 vs Surah 7:85–93 vs Surah 11:84–93. Textual critics state that based on the diversity of variants found in the manuscript evidence, the editing after Muhammad's death, the history of the transmission of the text showing destruction of variants (e.g. burning), early standardization attempts (e.g. 653–705 AD and 936 AD), along with other factors leads scholars to conclude that there "never was one original text of the Qur’an." Due to the textual diversity found in the Quran by modern scholars and even medieval Islamic scholars, it is doubtful that an original Quran can even be reconstructed. The diversity of contents in the Quran has led some scholars to suggest that the Quran possibly has multiple authors and/or editors. In Quranic studies, while the content of the Quran is seen to be geographically related to the Hejaz and non-Hejaz (Northern Arabian) regions, it is defined and classified in a historical context by fragments pointing to Syriac, Rabbinic, Arabian, Greek and Jewish Christian religious and ethnic origins. Guillaume Dye believes the Quran may be a composite text of traditions originating from many parts of Arabia, including but not limited to the Hejaz. (See ; Ahruf)

In order understand the early Quranic development, a survey of non-Muslim sources from the earliest period of Islam was conducted and concluded that non-Muslims show no awareness, in their writings, of a unique Muslim scripture until the 8th century, meaning that the Quran was not available or fixed until around that time. Furthermore, both Muslim and non-Muslim sources indicate that sections of the Qur’an such as suras: the Cow, the Women, and the Family of Imran; were independently circulated as separate works in the 8th century. A recent example of purging was how a large number of pre-1924 Quran variants were destroyed by disposing of them in the river Nile in order to standardize the 1924 Cairo Arabic edition used widely today. Meanwhile, it is also possible that the content of the present-day Qur'an provides information about the geography and history in which the text was likely written. As reported in the narrations, some expressions that are understood today as architectural works are used repeatedly in the Quran and shed light on the dates of writing of the relevant expressions which is known to continue even during the time of Hajjaj. The construction date of the Masjid al-Haram, which is mentioned 16 times in the Quran, is 78 AH, and the construction of the Masjid al-Aqsa coincides with the period of Abd al Malik or al Walid. (Note: Other architectural historians, Julian Rabi, Jere Bacharach, and Yildirim Yavuz, as well as the scholars H. I. Bell, Rafi Grafman and Myriam Rosen-Ayalon, and Amikam Elad, assert or suggest that Abd al-Malik started the project and al-Walid finished or expanded it.) Furthermore, with a natural external interpretation of the relevant verses, these structures should have been a night's walk from each other. (Note: Arabic and Persian writers such as 10th-century geographer al-Muqaddasi, 11th-century scholar Nasir Khusraw, 12th-century geographer al-Idrisi and 15th-century Islamic scholar Mujir al-Din, as well as 19th-century North American and British Orientalist scholars such as Edward Robinson, Guy Le Strange, and Edward Henry Palmer explained that the term Masjid al-Aqsa refers to the entire esplanade plaza also known as the Temple Mount or Haram al-Sharif ('Noble Sanctuary')—i.e., the entire area including the Dome of the Rock, the fountains, the gates, and the four minarets—because none of these buildings existed at the time when the Quran was written.) (Note: While "masjid" may simply be used as a place of worship, meaning a place of prostration traditionally used for worship, it may also refer to the buildings where these acts took place. In this case, the relevant verses could be dated after the construction of these buildings. Another verse alluding to Muhammad's Miraj story can be used to conclude that these two mosques are not that far apart. In this regard, one can consider the conclusions of scholars who point to Al-Aqsa being near Mecca —in the Al-Ji'rana region— or, conversely, the Revisionist school of Islamic studies, which suggests that the birth of Islam occurred in northwestern Arabia.) Modern Islamic orthodoxy places these structures in cities like Mecca and Jerusalem, thousands of kilometers away from where Muhammad miraculously flew.Surah Al-Isra 17:1 (See also:Bakkah)

== Contents ==
The Quranic content is concerned with basic Islamic beliefs including the existence of God and the resurrection. Narratives of the early prophets, ethical and legal subjects, historical events of Muhammad's time, charity and prayer also appear in the Quran. The Quranic verses contain general exhortations regarding right and wrong and historical events are related to outline general moral lessons. The style of the Quran has been called "allusive", with commentaries needed to explain what is being referred to—"events are referred to, but not narrated; disagreements are debated without being explained; people and places are mentioned, but rarely named." While tafsir in Islamic sciences expresses the effort to understand the implied and implicit expressions of the Quran, fiqh refers to the efforts to expand the meaning of expressions, especially in the verses related to the provisions, as well as understanding it.

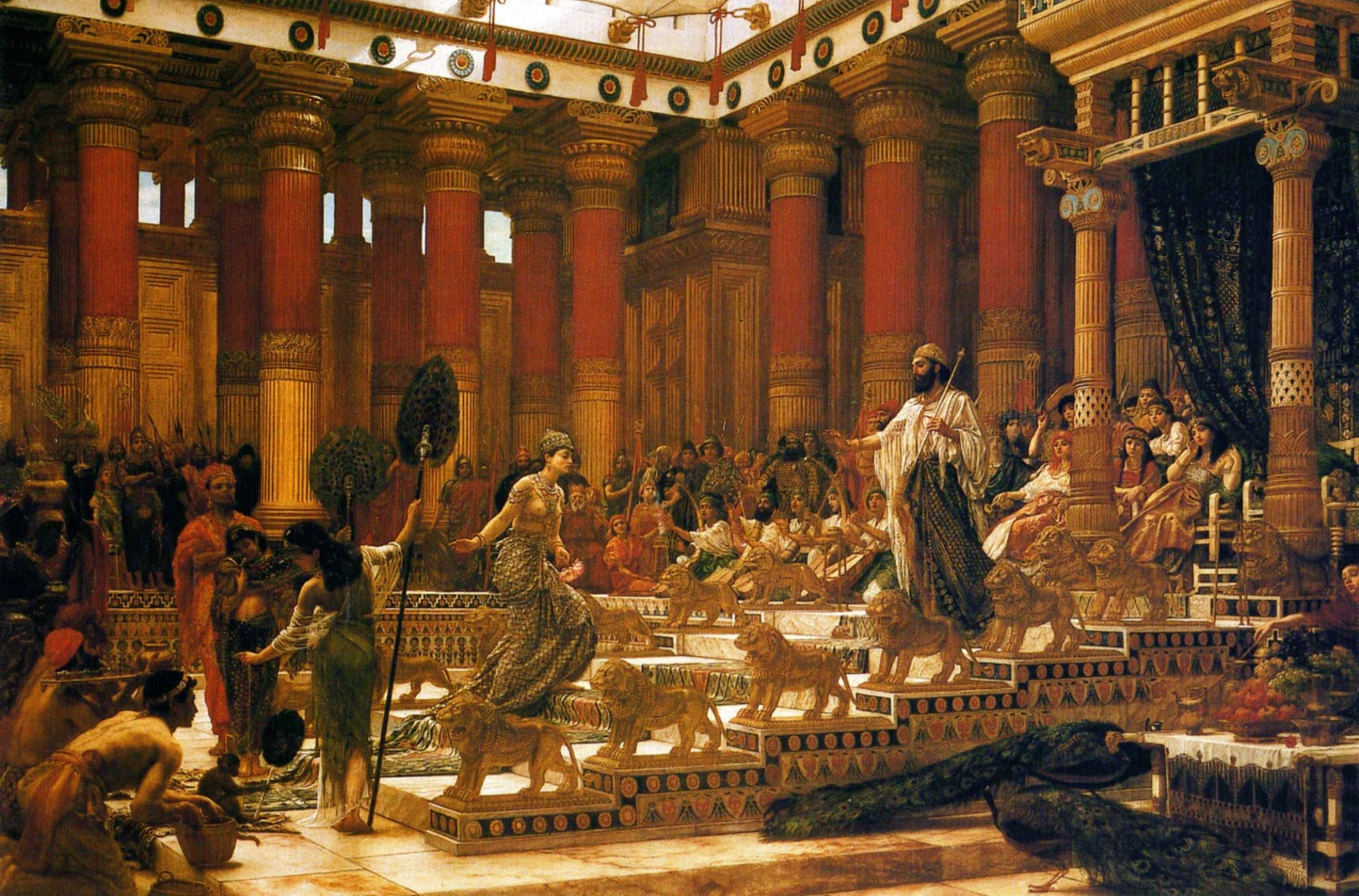
Solomon, the son of David, king of United Israeli Kingdom, had his temple built; which is still the subject of intercultural heritage fights today, under the name of Al-Aqsa, and placed different idols there for his multinational wives according to the Bible. Here he meets the legendary figure, Bilqis, by Edward Poynter, 1890.

Quranic studies state that, in the historical context, the content of the Quran is related to Rabbinic, Jewish-Christian, Syriac Christian and Hellenic literature, as well as pre-Islamic Arabia. Many places, subjects and mythological figures in the culture of Arabs and many nations in their historical neighborhoods, especially Judeo-Christian stories, are included in the Quran with small allusions, references or sometimes small narratives such as jannāt ʿadn, jahannam, Seven Sleepers, Queen of Sheba etc. The stories of Yusuf and Zulaikha, Moses, Family of Amram (parents of Mary according to the Quran) and mysterious hero Dhul-Qarnayn ("the man with two horns") who built a barrier against Gog and Magog that will remain until the end of time are more detailed and longer stories. Apart from semi-historical events and characters such as King Solomon and David, about Jewish history as well as the exodus of the Israelites from Egypt, tales of the hebrew prophets accepted in Islam, such as Creation, the Flood, struggle of Abraham with Nimrod, sacrifice of his son occupy a wide place in the Quran. However, the Qur'an is not a text that merely transmits this oral and written cultural heritage as it is; rather, it is a rhetorical text that —at times accounting for shifts in time, place, or context— transforms that heritage in line with its own language and monotheistic theological aims, presenting it in new combinations (Note: The clearest example of this is the way the family from the Torah narratives—consisting of Moses, Aaron, their sister Miriam, and their father Amram—is linked in the Qur'an to Mary, the mother of Jesus (where Mary is addressed as the sister of Aaron-Al Imran)) featuring unique typologies.

Some philosophers and scholars such as Mohammed Arkoun, who emphasize the mythological content of the Quran, are met with rejectionist attitudes in Islamic circles. In response to the fact that the people mentioned do not correspond to historically known figures, some modern commentators have suggested that these figures should be understood as representative figures portraying certain characters, rather than real ones. Furthermore, considering the findings of the revisionist school of Islamic studies, it is clear that the expression of certain narrative concepts in the Quran that refer to places, people, and events (such as Quraysh, Ababil, and Abu Lahab) in a single word or a few short sentences will require new interpretations and meanings that differ from the traditional narrative within this framework of understanding. (see:Quranic hermeneutics, Harut and Marut)

=== Creation and God ===
The central theme of the Quran is monotheism. God is depicted as living, eternal, omniscient and omnipotent (see, e.g., Quran 2:20, 2:29, 2:255). He is the creator of everything, of the heavens and the earth and what is between them (see, e.g., Quran 13:16, 2:253, 50:38, etc.). All human beings are equal in their utter dependence upon God, and their well-being depends upon their acknowledging that fact and living accordingly. The Quran uses cosmological and contingency arguments in various verses without referring to the terms to prove the existence of God; the universe is originated and therefore needs an originator, as whatever exists must have a sufficient cause for its existence. The design of the universe is frequently referred to as a point of contemplation: "It is He who has created seven heavens in harmony. You cannot see any fault in God's creation; then look again: Can you see any flaw?"

The word 'Allah' in Arabic calligraphy. Most considered it to be derived from a contraction of the definitive article al- and ilāh "god" meaning "the God".

"The Qur'ān insists that Muhammad and his followers worship the same God as the Jews (29:46). The Qur'an's Allah is the same Creator God who covenanted with Abraham". Francis Edward Peters states that the Quran portrays Allah as both more powerful and more remote than Yahweh, and as a universal deity, unlike Yahweh who closely follows Israelites. However, Yahweh is never used for God in the Quran and Islamic texts, (Note: Thou shalt not take the name of the Lord thy God in vain) but, Rabb is an Arabic word to refers to God meaning Lord and the Quran cites in several places as in the Al-Fatiha; "All Praise and Gratitude is due to God, Lord of all the Universe".

Even though Muslims do not doubt about the existence and unity of God, they may have adopted different attitudes that have changed and developed throughout history regarding his nature (attributes), names and relationship with creation. In contrast with pre-Islamic Arabian polytheism, as stated by Gerhard Böwering, God in Islam does not have associates and companions, nor is there any kinship between God and jinn. Pre Islamic Arabs believed in a blind, powerful, unstoppable and insensible fate over which man had no control. This was replaced with the Islamic belief of a powerful yet benevolent and merciful God's control over man's life. In the early periods of Islam, the concept of God was established as a personal deity living in the heavens. This understanding developed over time under the influence of Islamic theology, acquiring a transcendent character. However, in contrast to this transcendent and absolute conception of God established among the elite, the public and Sufis (Note: Tajalli (Arabic: تَجَلِّي, romanized: tajallī, lit. 'manifestation') is the appearance and disclosure of God as truth in Sufism. Tajalli is believed to be a process by which God manifests himself in concrete forms.) maintained the traditional understanding on God. Also actions and attributes such as coming, going, sitting, satisfaction, anger and sadness etc. similar to humans used for this God in the Quran were considered mutashabihat—"no one knows its interpretation except God" (Quran 3:7)—by later scholars stating that God was free from resemblance to humans in any way. (Note: Human qualities which are attributed to Allah in the Quran such as coming, going, sitting, satisfaction, anger and sadness; "Allah has equipped them with words to bring them closer to our minds; in this respect, they are like proverbs that are used to create a picture in the mind and thus help the listener to clearly understand the idea he wants to express.") Mustafa Öztürk points out the following words of Ahmad Ibn Hanbal in this regard: "Whoever says that Allah is everywhere is a heretic, an infidel. He should be invited to repent, but if he does not, be killed." This understanding changes later and gives way to the understanding that "God cannot be assigned a place and He is everywhere."

=== Prophetic stories ===
A distinctive characteristic of some of the individuals named as prophets in the Qur'an is that they often exercised their prophethood within a family context and belonged to the people of Israel; this can be observed in examples such as the family of Abraham, the family of Jacob, the line of David and Solomon and the family of Imran. According to Josef Horovitz, the stories of the prophets in the Quran generally follow a specific pattern: a prophet is sent to a community, the community rejects or attacks him, and ultimately, they are driven to destruction as divine punishment. However, the Quran, given its paraenetic self referential-polemicist discourse, does not offer a full narrative; but rather offers parabolic references to the doom of previous generations, assuming the audience is familiar with the told stories.

Although the narratives in question have been subjected to criticism regarding Isra'iliyyat in the modern era, they served as a primary source in classical universal historiography for constructing humanity's shared past and a Shem-centered ethnographic genealogy based on the sons of Noah —considered the "Second Adam"— namely Ham, Shem, and Japheth. The narrative of the construction of the Tower of Babel and the subsequent diversification of languages, which entered Islamic literature primarily through exegetical traditions, completes the missing link in this ethnographic construct by explaining how Noah’s descendants dispersed into distinct geographies, peoples, and linguistic groups. (Note: In addition to archaeological critiques, findings from physical anthropology, evolutionary linguistics, and population genetics further dismantle this traditional framework. Genetic mapping (Y-DNA and mtDNA phylogenies) and paleolinguistics prove that human migration, ethnic diversification, and language families evolved over tens of thousands of years through deep-time evolutionary processes, rendering the post-Diluvian tri-lineal descent (Ham, Shem, Japheth) and the abrupt "Babel glottogony" scientifically untenable.) Biblical archaeology has failed to uncover archaeological evidence confirming even the most popular religious stories, such as The Exodus and Noah's Flood (or the Ark) with the exception of David and Solomon —kings of Ancient Israel who are transformed into distinguished prophets in the Quran. However, it has been established that some of these stories —such as Noah's Flood and the tale of the infant Moses in the basket— are rooted in Mesopotamian legends such as Epic of Gilgamesh. A typical example of the accounts described is the story of Jonah —derived from the Hebrew Bible— which appears in summary form in several surahs. However, it differs from the aforementioned pattern in that the people to whom he was sent were not destroyed.

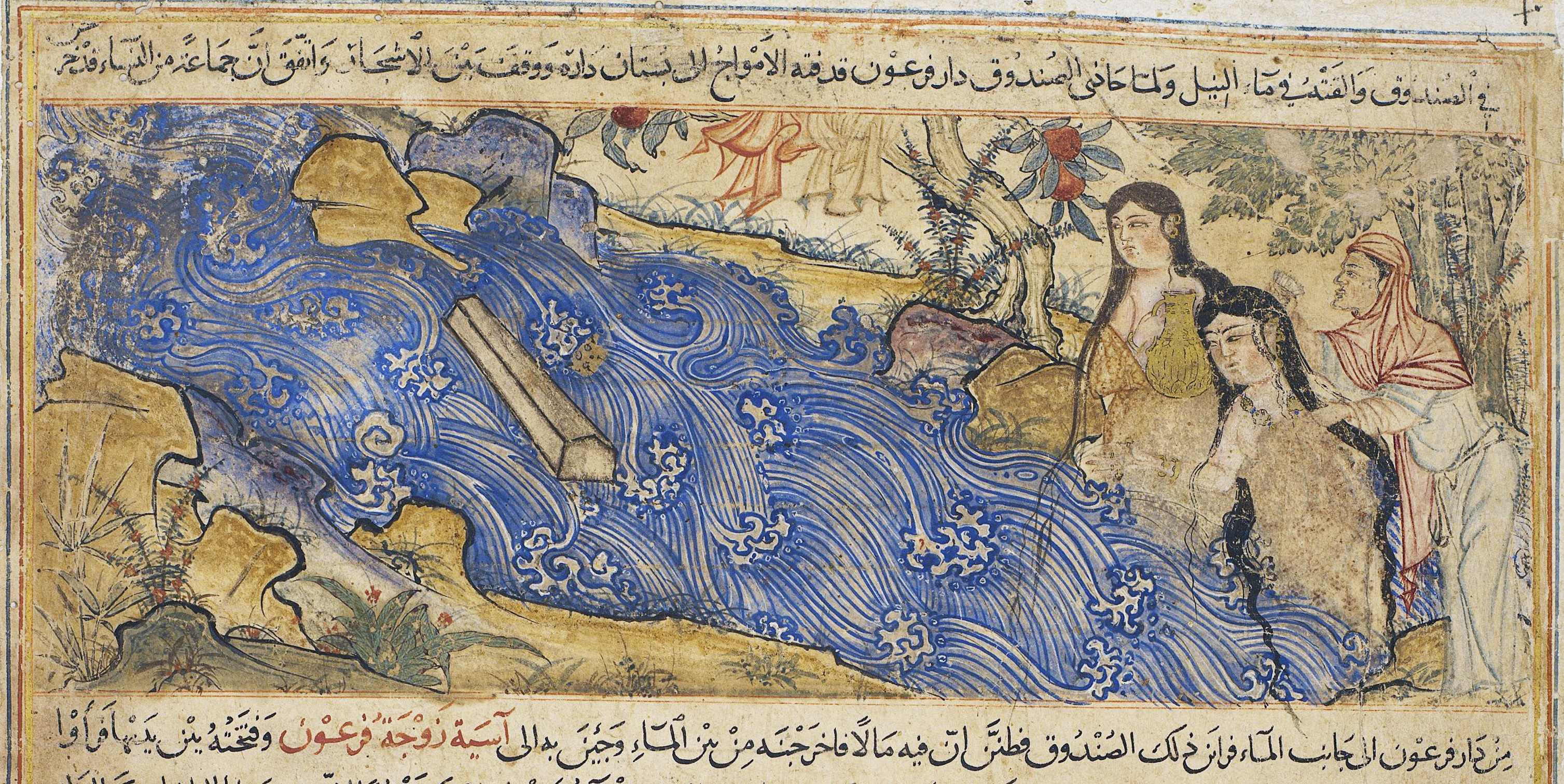
Asiya and her servants finding baby Moses in the Nile, Jami' al-tawarikh; possibly pious fiction that follows the footsteps of Sargon of Akkad's (Note: My mother, the high priestess, conceived; in secret she bore me, She set me in a basket of rushes, with bitumen she sealed my lid, She cast me into the river which rose over me.) accounts. It is a part of the founding myths of the Israelites, which were widely covered in the Quran.

Islam regards Abraham as a link in the chain of prophets that begins with Adam and culminates in Muhammad via Ishmael and mentioned in 35 chapters of the Quran, more often than any other biblical personage apart from Moses. Muslims regard him as a hanif, an archetype of the perfect Muslim, and revered prophet and builder of the Kaaba in Mecca. The Quran consistently refers to Islam as 'the religion of Abraham' (millat Ibrahim). In Islam, Eid-al-Adha is celebrated to commemorate Abraham's attempt to sacrifice his son by surrendering in line with his dream, (As-Saaffat; 100–107) which he accepted as the will of God.

In Islam, Moses is a prominent prophet and messenger of God and the most frequently mentioned individual in the Quran, with his name being mentioned 136 times and his life being narrated and recounted more than that of any other prophet. Unlike the hundreds of references in the Quran to the stories of prophets such as Moses and Jesus, it provides very little information about Muhammad himself, his companions, or his contemporaries. The individuals to whom the expressions used in Quranic polemics belong and the contexts in which they were used are merely notes made in commentaries written in later centuries. An exception is his slave/adopted son Zayd, whose name is mentioned in the verses (Al-Aḥzāb;37) in the context of his -divorced- wife being taken into Muhammad's marriages. Probably the clearest biographical account of Muhammad in the Quran is the brief mention of his followers' settlement in Yathrib after their expulsion by the Quraysh, and of military encounters such as the Muslim victory at Badr.

=== Ethico-religious concepts ===
While belief in God and obedience to the prophets are the main emphasis in the prophetic stories, there are also non-prophetic stories in the Quran that emphasize the importance of humility and having profound-inner knowledge (hikmah) besides trusting in God. This is the main theme in the stories of Khidr, Luqman and Dhul Qarnayn. According to the later ascriptions to these stories, it is possible for those with this knowledge and divine support to teach the prophets (Khidr-Moses story Quran 18:65–82) and employ jinn (Dhul Qarnayn). Those who "spend their wealth" on people who are in need because they devoted their lives to the way of Allah and whose situation is unknown because they are ashamed to ask, will be rewarded by Allah. (Al Baqara; 272-274) In the story of Qārūn, the person who avoids searching for the afterlife with his wealth and becomes arrogant will be punished, arrogance befits only God. (Al Mutakabbir) Characters of the stories can be closed-mythical, (Khidr) demi-mythologic or combined characters, and it can also be seen that they are Islamized. While some believe he was a prophet, some researchers equate Luqman with the Alcmaeon of Croton or Aesop.

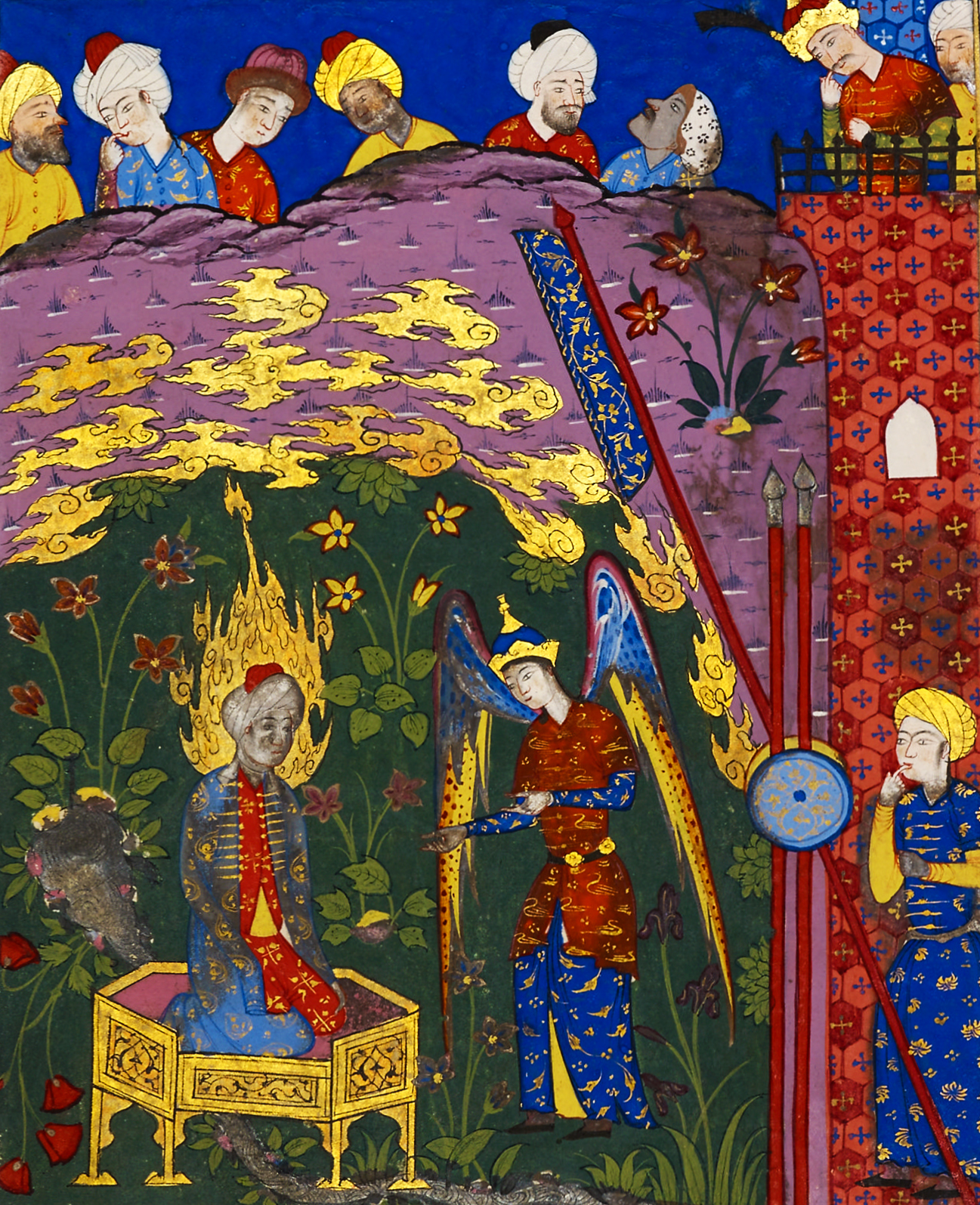
Islamic Persian miniature of Jibril protecting Ibrahim from Nimrod's fire.

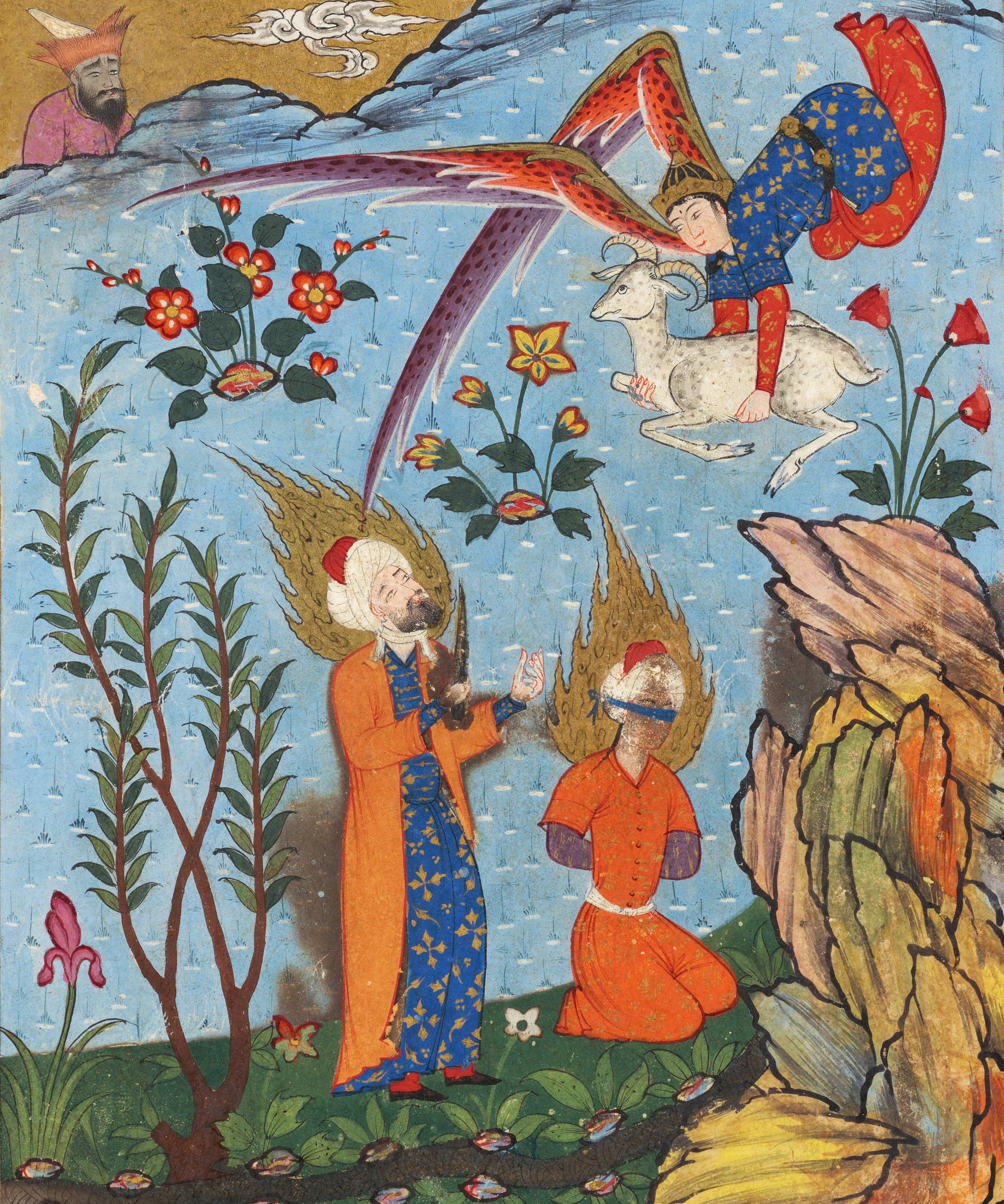
Sacrifice of Ibrahim's son. Quranic narratives affecting Islamic views: anti-idolatry, Qurban, and circumcision.

Commanding ma'ruf and forbidding munkar (Ar. ٱلْأَمْرُ بِٱلْمَعْرُوفِ وَٱلنَّهْيُ عَنِ ٱلْمُنْكَرِ) is repeated or referred to in nearly 30 verses in different contexts in the Quran and is an important part of Islamist / jihadist indoctrination today, as well as Shiite teachings.

Although a common translation of the phrase is "Enjoining good and forbidding evil", the words used by Islamic philosophy determining good and evil in discourses are "husn" and "qubh". The word ma'ruf literally means "known" or what is approved because of its familiarity for a certain society and its antithesis munkar means what is disapproved because it is unknown and extraneous.

The Quran is one of the fundamental sources of Islamic law (sharia). Some formal religious practices receive significant attention in the Quran including the salat and fasting in the month of Ramadan. As for the manner in which the prayer is to be conducted, the Quran refers to prostration. The term chosen for charity, zakat, literally means purification implies that it is a self-purification. In fiqh, the term fard is used for clear imperative provisions based on the Quran. However, it is not possible to say that the relevant verses are understood in the same way by all segments of Islamic commentators; For example, Hanafis accept 5 daily prayers as fard. However, some religious groups such as Quranists and Shiites, who do not doubt that the Quran existing today is a religious source, infer from the same verses that it is clearly ordered to pray two or three times, not five times. About six verses address the way a woman should dress when in public; Some Muslim scholars consider this verse referring to the Hijab while others to clothings in general. (Note: Beyza Bilgin states that the expression 'let them put their outer coverings over themselves' in the 59th verse of Al-Ahzab was revealed because they harassed women under the conditions of that day, considering them to be concubines, and commented as follows: In other words, veiling is a security issue that arose according to the needs of that period. These are not taken into consideration at all and are reflected as God's command. Women have been called God's command for a thousand years. Women said the same thing to their daughters and daughters-in-law. She said the following about covering herself in prayer: They tell me; 'Do you cover yourself while praying?' Of course, I cover up when I'm in congregation. I am obliged not to disturb the peace. But I also pray with my head uncovered in my own home. Because the Quran's requirement for prayer is not covering up, but ablution and turning towards the qibla. This is a thousand year old issue. It's so ingrained in us. But this should definitely not be underestimated. Because people do it thinking it is God's command. But on the other hand, we should not declare a person who does not cover up as a bad woman.)

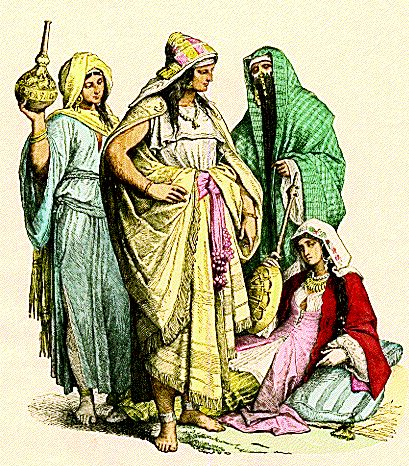
Early costumes of free, Arab women; philological research indicates that concepts such as "Ma'ruf" and "munkar" -which appear as frequently recurring mottos in the Quran— underwent a process of "Islamization." While "maʿruf " and "munkar" originally signified behaviors that were socially accepted or rejected across various historical contexts and geographical regions ie variable Urf, the terms would come to denote behaviors approved or rejected by Islamic jurists, fairly constant norms

Research shows that the rituals in the Quran, along with laws such as qisas and tax (zakat), developed as an evolution of pre-Islamic Arabian rituals. Arabic words meaning pilgrimage (hajj), prayer (salāt) and charity (zakāt) can be seen in pre-Islamic Safaitic-Arabic inscriptions, and this continuity can be observed in many details, especially in hajj and umrah.

=== Normative and political scope ===
A small number of verses in the Quran are about general rules of governance, inheritance, marriage, crime and punishment. Although the Quran does not impose a specific legal-management system, it emphasizes custom in nearly 40 verses and commands adl, (an-Nahl; 90, lit balance, often translated as justice). The practices prescribed in the Quran are considered as reflections of contextual legal understandings, as can be clearly seen in some examples such as Qisas and Diya. The following statement in the Quran is thought to be the general rule of testimony in Islamic jurisprudence, except for crime and punishment - for example, debt, shopping, etc.; O believers! When you contract a loan for a fixed period of time, commit it to writing....with justice. Call upon two of your men to witness. If two men cannot be found, then one man and two women of your choice will witness so if one of the women forgets the other may remind her.^{[Quran 4:11]}

As a different example, in the necklace story of Aisha, called Asbab al-Nuzul for surah An-Nur :11-20 four witnesses were required for the accusation of adultery. In addition, those who made accusations that did not meet the specified conditions would be punished with 80 lashes. The jurisprudence of later periods stipulates that witnesses must be men, covering all hadd crimes and people who did not have credibility and honesty in society (slaves, non-adl; sinners, infidels) could not testify against believers. In addition, the Islamic judiciary did not require proof of the issues defined as tazir. The statement in the Quran that determines the status of slaves in community is; Ma malakat aymanuhum meaning "those whom your right hands possess". The widespread use of slavery in the Islamic world continued until the last century, (Note: "The Caliphate in Baghdad at the beginning of the 10th Century had 7,000 black eunuchs and 4,000 white eunuchs in his palace." The Arab slave trade typically dealt in the sale of castrated male slaves. Black boys at the age of eight to twelve had their penises and scrota completely amputated. Reportedly, about two out of three boys died, but those who survived drew high prices.) and the unrestricted sexual use of female slaves, with a few exceptions such as they couldn't be loaned out (Note: In Shiite jurisprudence, it is unlawful for a master of a female slave to grant a third party the use of her for sexual relations. The Shiite scholar Shaykh al-Tusi stated: ولا يجوز إعارتها للاستمتاع بها لأن البضع لا يستباح بالإعارة "It is not permissible to loan (the slave girl) for enjoyment purpose, because sexual intercourse cannot be legitimate through loaning" and the Shiite scholars al-Muhaqiq al-Kurki, Allamah Al-Hilli and Ali Asghar Merwarid made the following ruling: ولا تجوز استعارة الجواري للاستمتاع "It is not permissible to loan the slave girl for the purpose of sexual intercourse") in traditional islamic jurisprudence while stated today often that sharia provides many rights to slaves and aims to eradicate slavery over time.

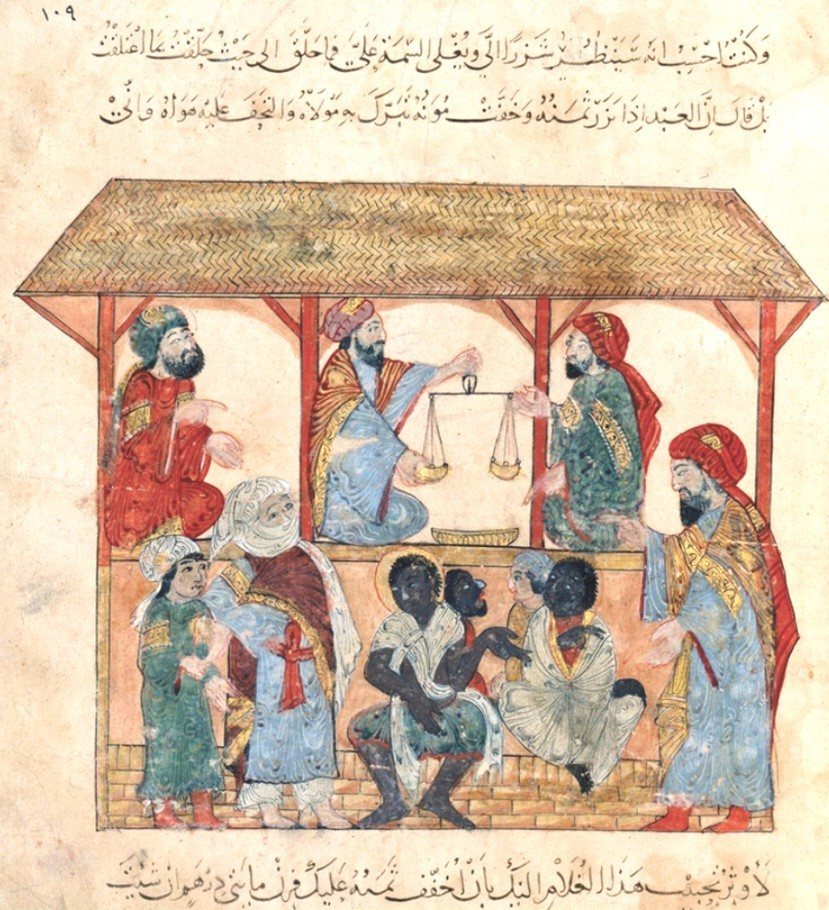
13th cc slave market, Yemen. Mustafa Öztürk, following in the footsteps of Fazlurrahman, argues that the verses were revealed in a historical context and derived rulings are not among the essence and aims of religion; Slaves and female slaves were considered property within the framework derived from the Quranic verses; Their masters could set them free, sell them, bequeath them, share them, or rent them out. Öztürk adds Al-Sarakhsi's ijtihad that the paternity of the born child in this situation could be determined by draw and asks; is there anyone among you who can accept this understanding today?

Sharia is a collection of laws and rules created by scholars' interpretations on the Quran and hadith collections, and has been developed over the centuries, changing according to different geographies and societies. Fiqh sects are schools of understanding that try to determine the actions that people should do or avoid based on the Quran and hadiths. The place of hadiths in legislation is controversial; for example, in the Hanafi sect, in order to claim that something is obligatory, that issue must be clearly expressed in the Quran. Some of these results may also indicate exaggeration of statements, generalizations taken out of context, and imperative broadening of scope. Of the few criminal cases listed as crimes in the Quran, only a few of them are punished by the classical books of sharia as determined by the verses of the Quran and are called hudud laws. How the verse Al-Ma'idah 33, which describes the crime of hirabah, should be understood is a matter of debate even today. The verse talks about the punishment of criminals by killing, hanging, having their hands and feet cut off on opposite sides, and being exiled from the earth, in response to an -abstract- crime such as "fighting against Allah and His Messenger". Expanding or narrowing the conditions and scope of this crime according to new situations and universal legal standards are issues that continue to be discussed today such as punishing in addition to rebellion against the legitimate government on "concrete sequential criminal acts" ie massacre, robbery and rape as preconditions. Mehmet Görmez draws a distinction between the concepts of shar'i (derived from Sharia) and mashru' (lit. approved by Sharia, legal); he states that not every ruling based on the sources of Sharia (nass) can be accepted as mashru' —a term he interprets as implying conformity with the principle of justice.

=== Eschatology ===
The doctrine of the last day and eschatology (the final fate of the universe) may be considered the second great doctrine of the Quran. It is estimated that approximately one-third of the Quran is eschatological, dealing with the afterlife in the next world and with the day of judgment at the end of time. The Quran does not assert a natural immortality of the human soul, since man's existence is dependent on the will of God: when he wills, he causes man to die; and when he wills, he raises him to life again in a bodily resurrection.

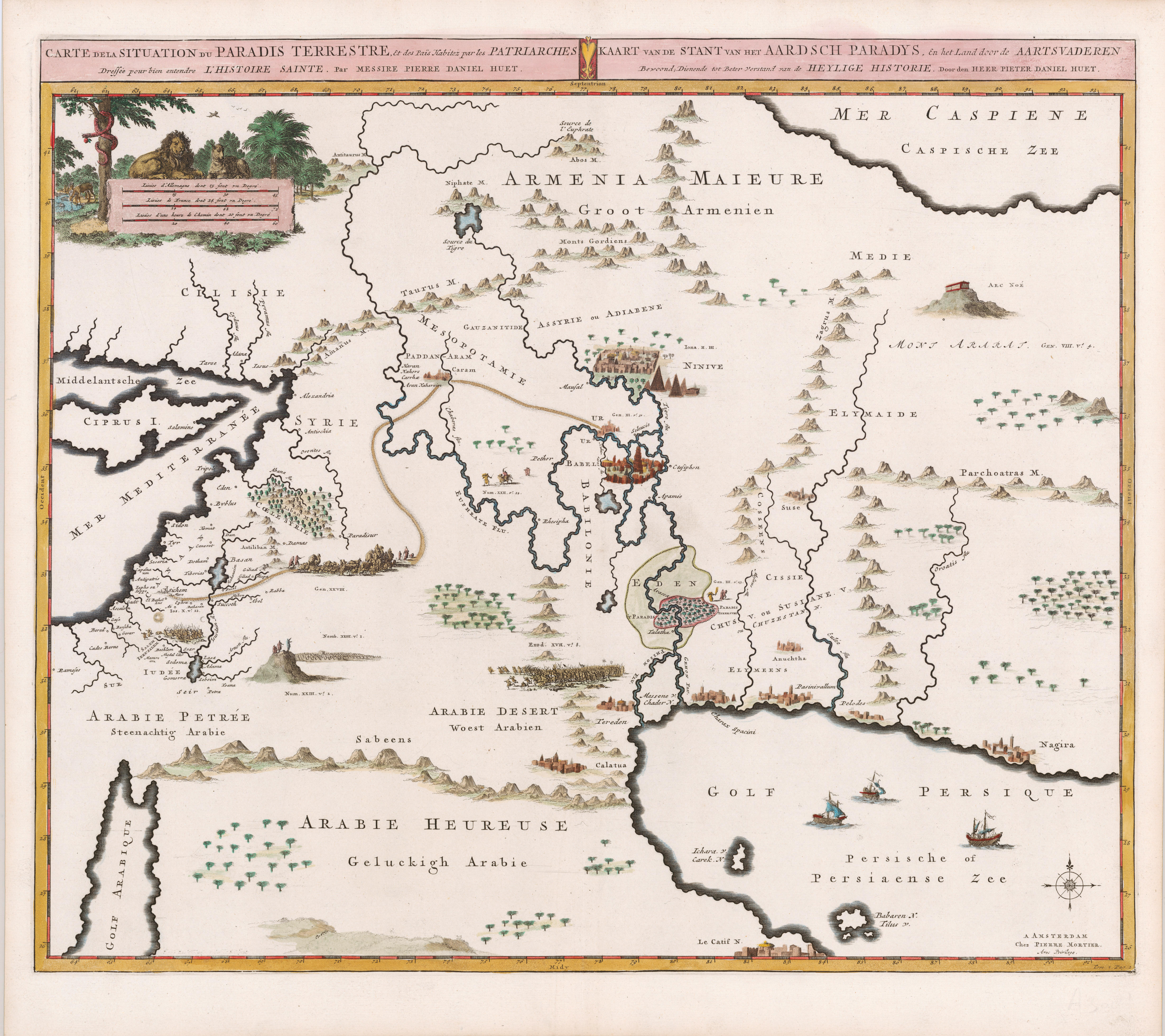
Map by Pierre Daniel Huet (1700), locating Garden of Eden as described in Genesis 2:10–14: also mentioned with the same name (jannāt ʿadn) in the Quran, with the difference is that it was not the place where Adam and Eve were sent down on earth, but the garden promised to believers after death.(Al-Kahf;30-31)

In the Quran belief in the afterlife is often referred in conjunction with belief in God: "Believe in God and the last day" emphasizing what is considered impossible is easy in the sight of God. A number of suras such as 44, 56, 75, 78, 81 and 101 are directly related to the afterlife and warn people to be prepared for the "imminent" day referred to in various ways. It is 'the Day of Judgment,' 'the Last Day,' 'the Day of Resurrection,' or simply 'the Hour.' Less frequently it is 'the Day of Distinction', 'the Day of the Gathering' or 'the Day of the Meeting'.

While most topics known as "signs of the apocalypse" in Islamic eschatology are based on non-Quranic sources, some references in the Quran were frequently understood as apocalyptic terms, such as fitna, Dabba, and Gog and Magog. At the time of the Mongol conquests, ibn Kathir identified the latter with the historical Turks and Mongols. The apocalyptic writings frequently feature extra-Quranic figures such as the Dajjāl (corresponding to Armilos and Anti-Christ) and the Mahdī. The Dajjāl is supposed to become a cause of misguidance and causes havoc on earth, but is ultimately stopped by either the Mahdī or ʿĪsā (Jesus) who returns to earth from heaven.

When the time of the apocalypse comes -which is told in a poetic form- the sun is rolled up, the stars fall down, seas are set on fire, mountains are moved people run away in fear and pregnant women miscarry.(At-Takwir 1-7) Then a square is set up and the king or lord of the day;(māliki yawmi-d-dīn) (Note: Qira'at: All except for ʻAsem, Al-Kesa'i, Yaʻqub and Khalaf in one of his narrations read it as ^{4} King of the Day of Judgement.) comes and shows his shin; the looks are fearful, those gathered in the square are invited to prostrate;(Al-Qalam 42-43) the question asked is why the innocent female children were killed.(At-Takwir 8-9)

== Interpretation ==
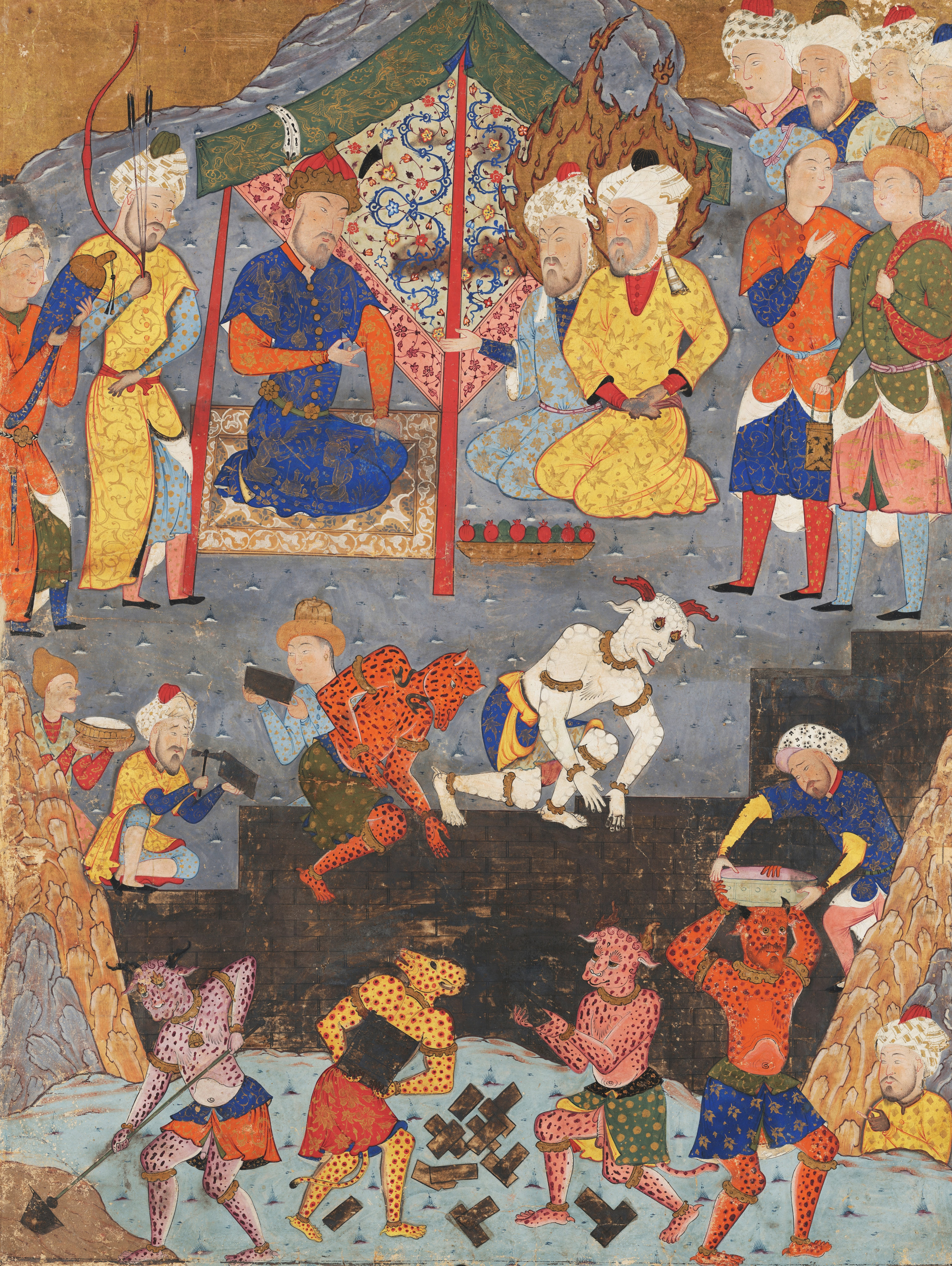
One of the figures mentioned in the Quran —Al-Kahf 94-97— by a title or epithet commonly used among the people is Dhu al-Qarnayn, identified by the vast majority of scholars as Alexander the Great (Note: Watt 1960–2007: "It is generally agreed both by Muslim commentators and modéra [sic] occidental scholars that Dhu 'l-Ḳarnayn [...] is to be identified with Alexander the Great." Cook 2013: "[...] Dhū al-Qarnayn (usually identified with Alexander the Great) [...]".) constructs a barrier —with the assistance of the jinn— to keep out Gog and Magog. The latter originated in the Hebrew Bible as the names of a place and a people, but over the centuries, evolved into two major eschatological groups. Miniature, Chester Beatty Library.

Tafsir (Arabic: تفسير, romanized: tafsīr [tafˈsiːr]; English: explanation) refers to an exegesis, or commentary, of the Quran. An author of a tafsir is a mufassir (Arabic: مُفسّر; plural: Arabic: مفسّرون, romanized: mufassirūn). A Quranic tafsir attempts to provide elucidation, explanation, interpretation, context or commentary for clear understanding and conviction of God's will in Islam. In the classical approach, the exegesis of the Qur'an is built on the 7th verse of Al Imran-7;

"He is the one who has sent down to you the Book. In it are verses that are sound (muhkamat), which are the foundation of the Book, and others that are assimilated (mutashabihat; resembling one another)." In classical approach verses that speak of Allah's "hand," "throne" (arsh), or His "sitting on throne" (istiwa) are considered mutashabih. These expressions are not believed to refer to a physical organ or action but are seen as metaphorical expressions symbolizing Allah's power, knowledge, or majesty.

On the other hand it is believed in Muslim community that full understanding of it can only be possible with the depths obtained in the basic and religious sciences that the ulema (imams in shia) might access, as "heirs of the prophets". For this reason, direct reading of the Quran or applications based on its literal translations are considered problematic except for some groups such as Quranists thinking that the Quran is a complete and clear book; and tafsir / fiqh are brought fore to correct understandings in it. With a classical approach, scholars will discuss verses of the Quran in context called asbab al-nuzul in islamic literature, as well as language and linguistics; will pass it through filters such as muhkam and mutashabih, nasıkh and abrogated; will open the closed expressions and try to guide the believers. There is no standardization in Quran translations, and interpretations range from traditional scholastic, to literalist-salafist understandings to Esoteric-Sufist, to modern and secular exegesis according to the personal scientific depth and tendencies of scholars.

Principally, a tafsir deals with the issues of linguistics, jurisprudence, and theology. In terms of perspective and approach, tafsir can be broadly divided into two main categories, namely tafsir bi-al-ma'thur (lit. received tafsir), which is transmitted from the early days of Islam through the Islamic prophet Muhammad and his companions, and tafsir bi-al-ra'y (lit. tafsir by opinion), which is arrived through personal reflection or independent rational thinking.

Knowledge of context / Asbab al-Nuzul; a scholar must understand the reasons and circumstances of a revelation in order to interpret the text correctly. If a verse is isolated without knowing the context, it can be misinterpreted. Quranic hermeneutics, and hermeneutics in general, refers to efforts to understand the Quran and Islamic texts through a more objective and secular approach, using universal criteria and moving beyond traditionally imposed forms. The Syro-Aramaic Reading of the Koran offers a new and compelling approach to understanding the implications of the Quran, based on linguistic and geographical-cultural knowledge that also coincides with the findings of historical research of the revisionist school.

There are different characteristics and traditions for each of the tafsirs representing respective schools and doctrines, such as Sunni Islam, Shia Islam, and Sufism. There are also general distinctions between classic tafsirs compiled by authoritative figures of Muslim scholarship during the formative ages of Islam, and modern tafsir which seeks to address a wider audience, including the common people.

Cedrus libani, also represented on the Lebanese flag; While sacred cosmic/tree motifs in ancient Near Eastern traditions often center on the cedar, classical exegesis and translations typically render Sidrat al-Muntaha (Q. 53:14–16) as a lote tree. From a hermeneutical perspective, analyzing the meaning of such expressions and symbols requires examining them within their broader historical and cultural contexts.

=== Exoteric and Esoteric interpretations (ta'wil) ===
Commentaries dealing with the zahir ('outward aspects') of the text are called tafsir, (explanation) and hermeneutic and esoteric commentaries dealing with the batin are called ta'wil ('interpretation'). Commentators with an esoteric slant believe that the ultimate meaning of the Quran is known only to God. Esoteric or Sufi interpretation relates Quranic verses to the inner or esoteric (batin) and metaphysical dimensions of existence and consciousness. According to Sands, esoteric interpretations are more suggestive than declarative, and are allusions (isharat) rather than explanations (tafsir). They indicate possibilities as much as they demonstrate the insights of writers.

Shias and Sunnis as well as some Muslim philosophers believe the meaning of the Quran is not restricted to the literal aspect. In contrast, Quranic literalism, followed by Salafis and Zahiris, is the belief that the Quran should only be taken at its apparent meaning. Henry Corbin narrates a hadith that goes back to Muhammad:

The Quran possesses an external appearance and a hidden depth, an exoteric meaning and an esoteric meaning. This esoteric meaning in turn conceals an esoteric meaning. So it goes on for seven esoteric meanings.

According to esoteric interpreters, the inner meaning of the Quran does not eradicate or invalidate its outward meaning. Rather, it is like the soul, which gives life to the body. Corbin considers the Quran to play a part in Islamic philosophy, because Gnosiology itself goes hand in hand with prophetology.

== Characteristics of the text ==
=== Arrangement ===
The Quran consists of 114 chapters of varying lengths, known as a sūrah. Each sūrah consists of verses, known as āyāt, which originally means a 'sign' or 'evidence' sent by God. The number of verses differs from sūrah to sūrah. An individual verse may be just a few letters or several lines. The total number of verses in the most popular Hafs Quran is 6,236; (Note: Scholars disagree on the exact number but this is a disagreement over "the placing of the divisions between the verese, not on the text itself.") however, the number varies if the bismillahs are counted separately. According to one estimate the Quran consists of 77,430 words, 18,994 unique words, 12,183 stems, 3,382 lemmas and 1,685 roots.

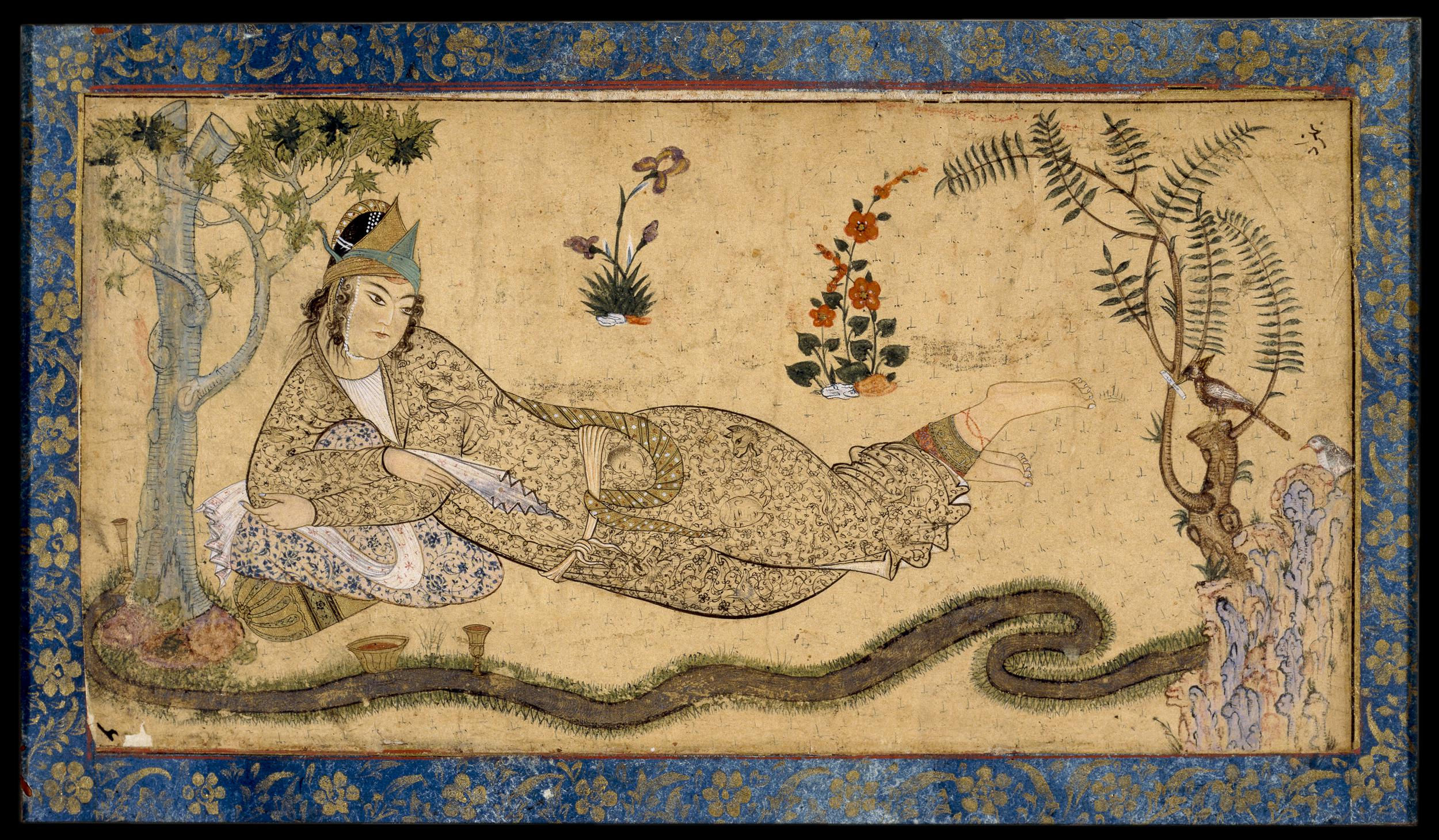
Belqeys, Queen of Sheba, one of the legendary figures in the Bible whose story is told without naming in the Quran, lying in a garden, facing a hoopoe, Solomon's messenger. Persian miniature (c. 1595).

Chapters are classified as Meccan or Medinan, depending on whether the verses were revealed before or after the migration of Muhammad to the city of Medina on traditional account. However, a sūrah classified as Medinan may contain Meccan verses in it and vice versa. Sūrah names are derived from a name or a character in the text, or from the first letters or words of the sūrah. Chapters are not arranged in chronological order, rather the chapters appear to be arranged roughly in order of decreasing size. Each sūrah except the ninth starts with the Bismillah (بِسْمِ ٱللَّٰهِ ٱلرَّحْمَٰنِ ٱلرَّحِيمِ), an Arabic phrase meaning 'In the name of God.' There are, however, still 114 occurrences of the Bismillah in the Quran, due to its presence in Quran 27:30 as the opening of Solomon's letter to the Queen of Sheba.

The Muqattaʿat (Arabic: حروف مقطعات ḥurūf muqaṭṭaʿāt, 'disjoined letters, disconnected letters'; also 'mysterious letters') are combinations of between one and five Arabic letters figuring at the beginning of 29 out of the 114 chapters of the Quran just after the basmala. The letters are also known as fawātih (فواتح), or 'openers', as they form the opening verse of their respective suras. Four surahs are named for their muqatta'at: Ṭāʾ-Hāʾ, Yāʾ-Sīn, Ṣād, and Qāf. Various theories have been put forward; they were a secret communication language between Allah and Muhammad, abbreviations of various names or attributes of Allah, symbols of the versions of the Quran belonging to different companions, elements of a secret coding system, or expressions containing esoteric meanings. Some researchers associate them with hymns used in Syrian Christianity. The phrases must have been part of these hymns or abbreviations of frequently repeated introductory phrases. Some of them, such as Nun, were used in symbolic meanings.

In addition of the division into chapters, there are various ways of dividing Quran into parts of approximately equal length for convenience in reading. The 30 juz' (plural ajzāʼ) can be used to read through the entire Quran in a month. A juz' is sometimes further divided into two ḥizb (plural aḥzāb), and each hizb subdivided into four rubʻ al-ahzab. The Quran is also divided into seven approximately equal parts, manzil (plural manāzil), for it to be recited in a week. A different structure is provided by semantic units resembling paragraphs and comprising roughly ten āyāt each. Such a section is called a ruku.

==== Variants ====
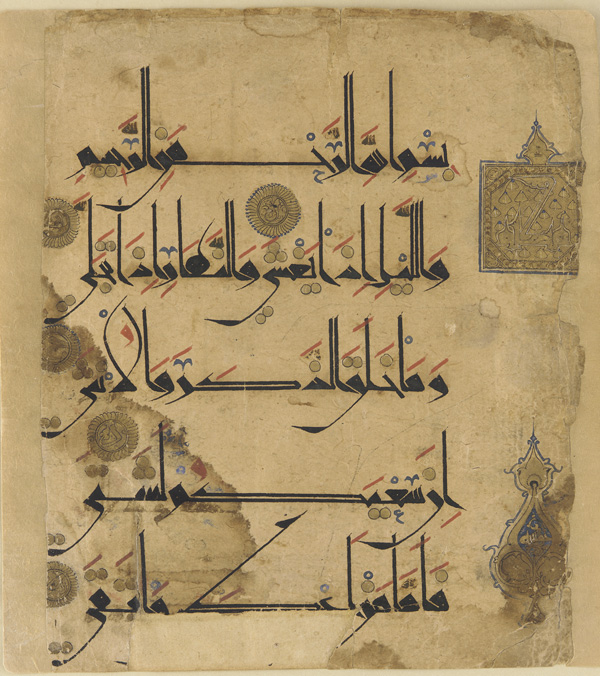
Page of the Quran with vocalization marks

Early Quranic manuscripts lacked diacritical marks; this allowed for multiple ways of reading the same written text. Furthermore, what scholars refer to as "variant readings" (qirāʾāt) of the Quran encompasses not only various ways of reading the same text but also a range of actual textual variants. According to Melchert (2008), the majority of disagreements have to do with vowels to supply, most of them in turn not conceivably reflecting dialectal differences and about one in eight disagreements has to do with whether to place dots above or below the line. Nasser categorizes variant readings into various subtypes, including internal vowels, long vowels, gemination (shaddah), assimilation and alternation.

The 10th-century Muslim scholar from Baghdad, Ibn Mujāhid, is famous for establishing seven acceptable textual readings of the Quran. He studied various readings and their trustworthiness and chose seven 8th-century readers from the cities of Mecca, Medina, Kufa, Basra and Damascus. Ibn Mujahid did not explain why he chose seven readers, rather than six or ten, but this may be related to a prophetic tradition (Muhammad's saying) reporting that the Quran had been revealed in seven ahruf. Today, the most popular readings are those transmitted by Ḥafṣ (d. 796) and Warsh (d. 812) which are according to two of Ibn Mujahid's reciters, Aasim ibn Abi al-Najud (Kufa, d. 745) and Nafiʽ al-Madani (Medina, d. 785), respectively. The influential standard Quran of Cairo uses an elaborate system of modified vowel-signs and a set of additional symbols for minute details and is based on ʻAsim's recitation, the 8th-century recitation of Kufa. This edition has become the standard for modern printings of the Quran. Occasionally, an early Quran shows compatibility with a particular reading. A Syrian manuscript from the 8th century is shown to have been written according to the reading of Ibn Amir ad-Dimashqi. Another study suggests that this manuscript bears the vocalization of himsi region.

According to Ibn Taymiyyah vocalization markers indicating specific vowel sounds (tashkeel) were introduced into the text of the Quran during the lifetimes of the last Sahabah.

=== Literary style ===
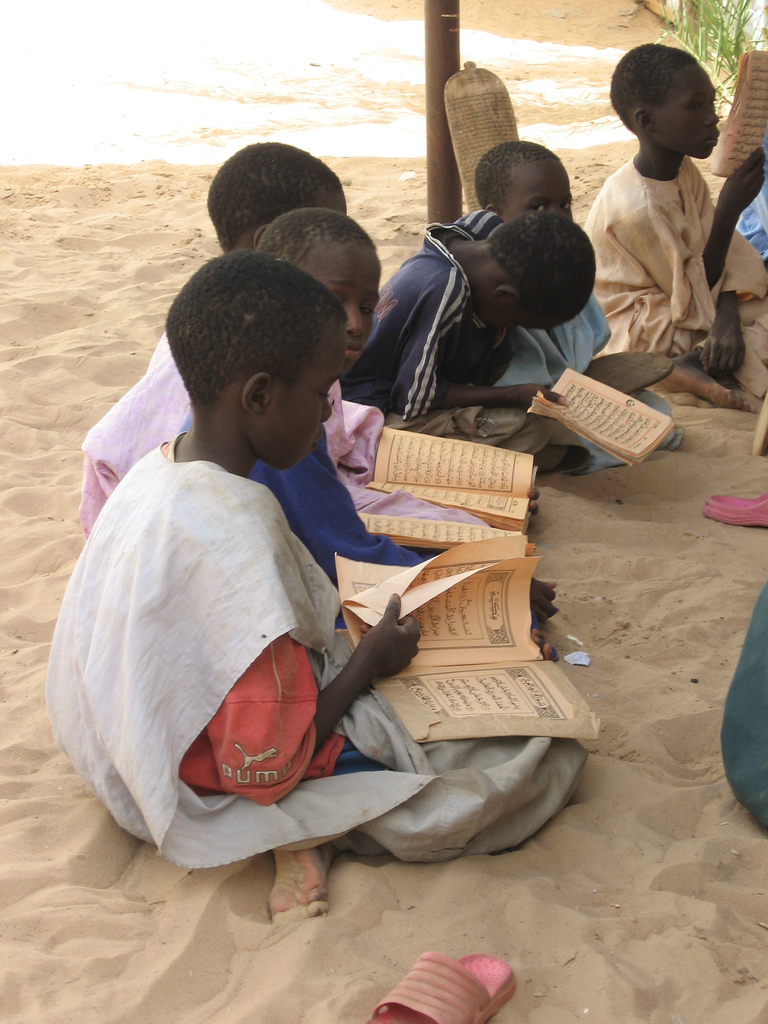
Boys studying the Quran in Touba, Senegal

The language of the Quran has been described as "rhymed prose" as it partakes of both poetry and prose; however, this rhythmic quality is more poetic in some parts and more prose-like in others. Rhyme, while found throughout the Quran, is conspicuous in many of the earlier Meccan suras, in which relatively short verses throw the rhyming words into prominence. The effectiveness of such a form is evident for instance in Sura 81, and there can be no doubt that these passages impressed the conscience of the hearers. Frequently a change of rhyme from one set of verses to another signals a change in the subject of discussion. Later sections also preserve this form but the style is more expository.

In terms of its themes and flow, the text of the Quran presents a non-linear structure—resembling a network or a web—that appears to lack a distinct beginning, middle, or end. The organization of the text has been subject to criticism due to its perceived lack of continuity, the absence of a chronological or thematic arrangement, and the presence of repetitions. (Note: "The final process of collection and codification of the Quran text was guided by one over-arching principle: God's words must not in any way be distorted or sullied by human intervention. For this reason, no serious attempt, apparently, was made to edit the numerous revelations, organize them into thematic units, or present them in chronological order... This has given rise in the past to a great deal of criticism by European and American scholars of Islam, who find the Quran disorganized, repetitive and very difficult to read." Samuel Pepys: "One feels it difficult to see how any mortal ever could consider this Quran as a Book written in Heaven, too good for the Earth; as a well-written book, or indeed as a book at all; and not a bewildered rhapsody; written, so far as writing goes, as badly as almost any book ever was!") Michael Sells argues that this apparent disorder and the use of repetition are, in fact, literary devices capable of producing profound effects. Another group of researchers interprets these irregularities and repetitions as vestiges of an oral phase that they believe preceded the formalization and arrangement of the Quran as a written text.

The Quran is a literary work that references sacred texts preceding it —such as the Torah, the Gospel, and the Psalms— and communicates with its audience based on the assumption that they are already familiar with these texts.(metatextuality) It positions itself as a continuation of this chain of divine revelation, and indeed as a confirmer and guardian of the earlier scriptures. In doing so, it speaks of its own text as if it were an entity independent of itself; it thereby emphasizes that its source is God directly, frequently making self-referential allusions. (Note: According to Wild the Quran is highly self-referential. The feature is more evident in early Meccan suras.) According to Stefan Wild, the Quran demonstrates this characteristic by explaining, classifying, interpreting and justifying the words to be transmitted. Self-referentiality is evident in those passages where the Quran refers to itself as revelation (tanzil), remembrance (dhikr), news (naba'), criterion (furqan) in a self-designating manner (explicitly asserting its Divinity, "And this is a blessed Remembrance that We have sent down; so are you now denying it?"), or in the frequent (a total of 332 times) appearance of the "Say" tags, when Muhammad is commanded to speak (e.g., "Say: 'God's guidance is the true guidance'", "Say: 'Would you then dispute with us concerning God?'"). Michael Cook has drawn attention to the history of this phenomenon, which creates the impression that a divine command was conveyed directly to the Muhammad: in the original texts (rasm), there was no distinction between the expressions "say" (qul) and "he said" (qāl). In later texts, however, the sequence of letters "ql" —which could be read as either "he said" or "say"— was standardized in many instances to be read specifically as "say."

For Muslims such as Mustafa Khattab, the phonetic and thematic structures of the Quran—enriched by various literary devices—are among the qualities that render the content and style of the Quran inimitable.

==== Inimitability ====
In Islam, 'i'jāz (Arabic: اَلْإِعْجَازُ), "inimitability challenge" of the Quran in sense of feṣāḥa and belagha (both eloquence and rhetoric) is the doctrine which holds that the Quran has a miraculous quality, both in content and in form, that no human speech can match. According to this, the Quran is a miracle and its inimitability is the proof granted to Muhammad in authentication of his prophetic status. The literary quality of the Quran has been praised by Muslim scholars and by many non-Muslim scholars. The doctrine of the miraculousness of the Quran is further emphasized by Muhammad's illiteracy since the unlettered prophet could not have been suspected of composing the Quran.

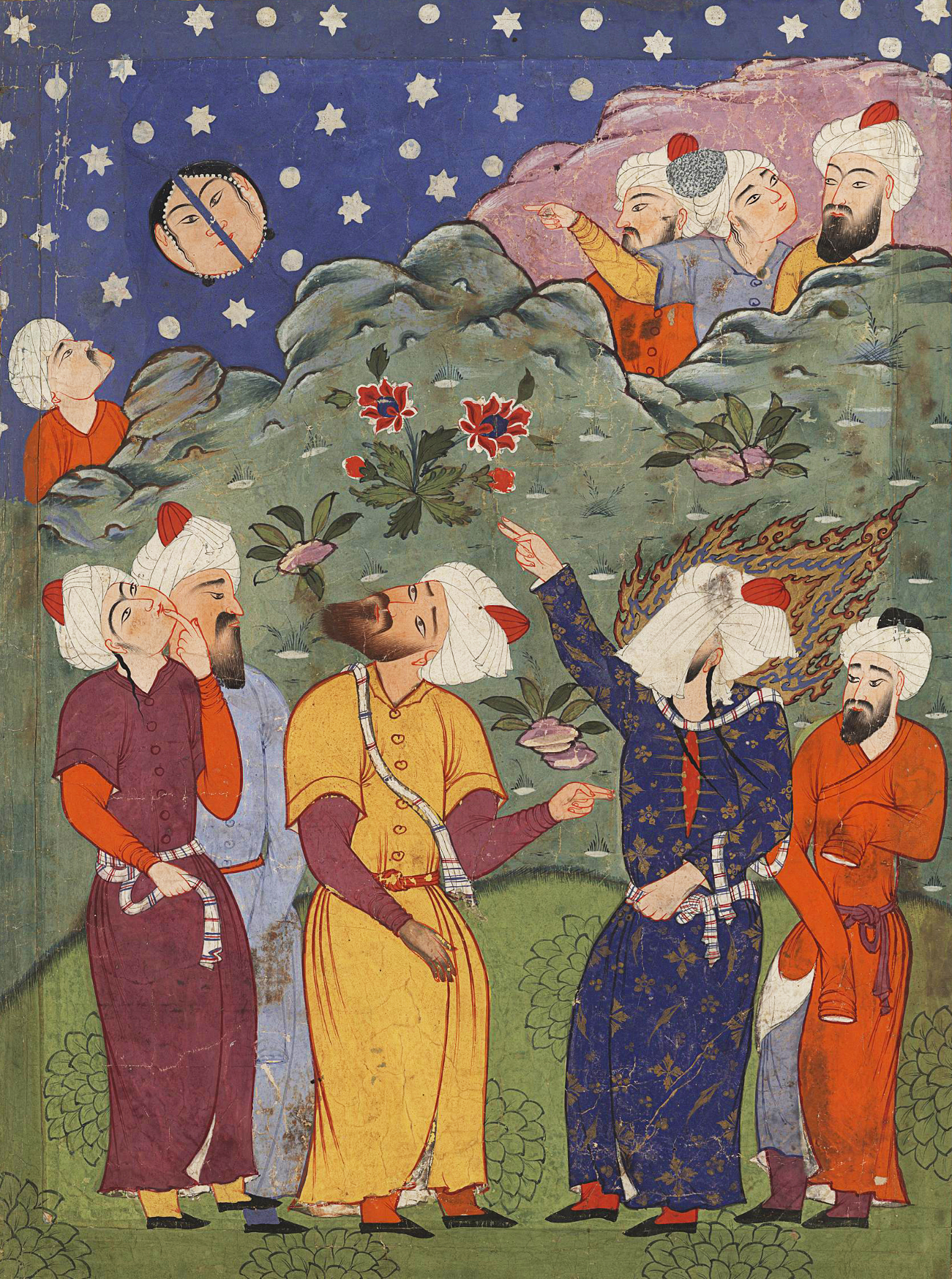
Splitting of the Moon, Muhammad with hidden face. 16th-century falnama. A possible idiom, Surah Al-Qamar 54:1–2 also mentioned in Imru' al-Qais poems, was understood as the physical disintegration and supported by hadiths despite the Quran itself denies miracles, in the traditional sense. (Note: Mehmet Özdemir (prof.dr.) regarding sirah draws attention to the almost non-existent number of miracles (dalāʾil al-nubuwwa) in the first records and the hundreds of additions made in later periods.)

The Quran is widely regarded as the finest work in Arabic literature. The emergence of the Quran was an oral and aural poetic experience; the aesthetic experience of reciting and hearing the Quran is often regarded as one of the main reasons behind conversion to Islam in the early days. Pre-Islamic Arabic poetry was an element of challenge, propaganda and warfare, and those who incapacitated their opponents from doing the same in feṣāḥa and Belagha socially honored, as could be seen on Mu'allaqat poets. The etymology of the word "shā'ir; (poet)" connotes the meaning of a man of inspirational knowledge, of unseen powers. `To the early Arabs poetry was ṣihr ḥalāl and the poet was a genius who had supernatural communications with the jinn or spirits, the muses who inspired him.' Although pre-Islamic Arabs gave poets status associated with suprahuman beings, soothsayers and prophecies were seen as persons of lower status. Contrary to later hurufic and recent scientific prophecy claims, traditional miracle statements about the Quran hadn't focused on prophecies, with a few exceptions like the Byzantine victory over the Persians in wars that continued for hundreds of years with mutual victories and defeats.

The first works about the 'i'jāz of the Quran began to appear in the 9th century in the Mu'tazila circles, which emphasized only its literary aspect, and were adopted by other religious groups. According to grammarian Al-Rummani the eloquence contained in the Quran consisted of tashbīh, istiʿāra, taǧānus, mubālaġa, concision, clarity of speech (bayān), and talāʾum. He also added other features developed by himself; the free variation of themes (taṣrīf al-maʿānī), the implication content (taḍmīn) of the expressions and the rhyming closures (fawāṣil). The most famous works on the doctrine of inimitability are two medieval books by the grammarian Al Jurjani (d. 1078 CE), Dala'il al-i'jaz ('the Arguments of Inimitability') and Asraral-balagha ('the Secrets of Eloquence'). Al Jurjani believed that Quran's eloquence must be a certain special quality in the manner of its stylistic arrangement and composition or a certain special way of joining words. Angelika Neuwirth lists the factors that led to the emergence of the doctrine of 'i'jāz: The necessity of explaining some challenging verses in the Quran; In the context of the emergence of the theory of "proofs of prophecy" (dâ'il an-nubuwwa) in Islamic theology, proving that the Quran is a work worthy of the emphasized superior place of Muhammad in the history of the prophets, thus gaining polemical superiority over Jews and Christians; Preservation of Arab national pride in the face of confrontation with the Iranian Shu'ubiyya movement, etc. Orientalist scholars Theodor Nöldeke, Friedrich Schwally and John Wansbrough, pointing out linguistic defects, held similar opinions on the Quranic text as careless and imperfect.

== Sociological impact and response ==
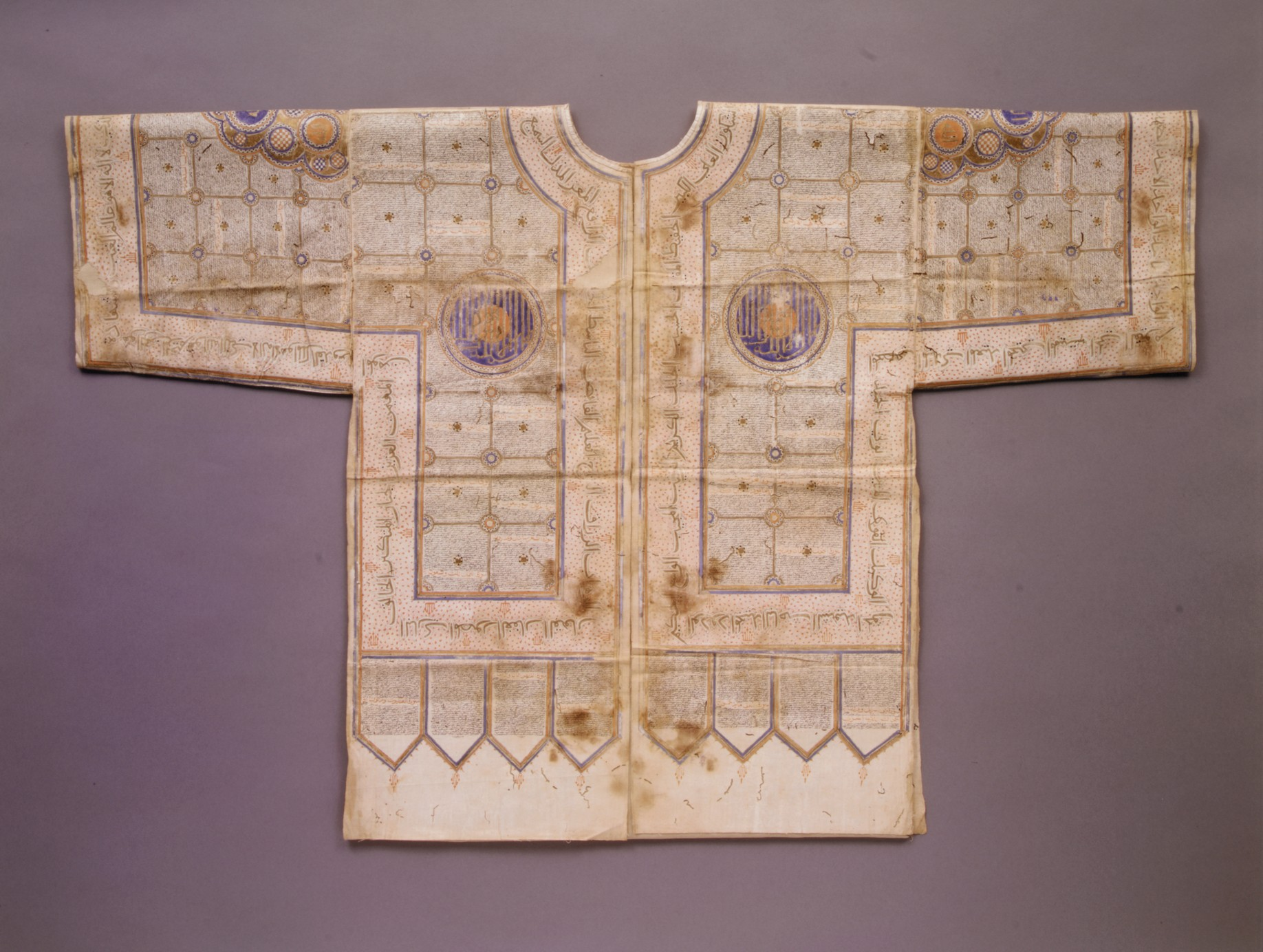
Talismanic tunic, North India-Deccan, Metropolitan Museum

In folk religiosity, it is revered by pious Muslims as "the holy of holies", whose sound moves some to "tears and ecstasy", it is the physical symbol of the faith, the text often used as a charm on occasions of birth, death, and marriage. Traditionally, before starting to read the Quran, ablution is performed, one seeks refuge in Allah from the accursed Satan, and the reading begins by mentioning the names of Allah, Rahman and Rahim together known as basmala. Consequently, It must never rest beneath other books, but always on top of them, one must never drink or smoke when it is being read aloud, and it must be listened to in silence. It is a talisman against disease and disaster. Muslims believe that the present Quranic text corresponds to that revealed to Muhammad, and according to their interpretation of Quran 15:9, it is protected from corruption. (Note: "Indeed, it is We who sent down the Quran and indeed, We will be its guardians".) Muslims consider the Quran to be a sign of the prophethood of Muhammad and the truth of the religion. For this reason, in traditional Islamic societies, great importance was given to children memorizing the Quran, and those who memorized the entire Quran were honored with the title of hafiz. Even today, "millions and millions of people refer to the Koran daily to explain their actions and to justify their aspirations" (Note: Algerian Mohammed Arkoun, Professor Emeritus of Islamic Thought at the University of Paris .) or view it as a source of various scientific insights —or, as presented in some circles- as the very source of knowledge itself, though this has been criticized as pseudoscientific.

According to Islam, the Quran is the word of God namely Kalām Allāh. (Note: Quran says, "We have sent down the Quran in truth, and with the truth it has come down" and frequently asserts in its text that it is divinely ordained. The Quran speaks of a written pre-text that records God's speech before it is sent down, the "preserved tablet" that is the basis of the belief in fate also, and Muslims believe that the Quran was sent down or started to be sent down on the Laylat al-Qadr.) In Christianity, the concept of being the essence or the "Word" (Logos) of God —expressed through various terms— is an attribute ascribed to Jesus; in Islam, however, this concept bifurcates; Within Islamic mysticism, the Logos is attributed to Muhammad, whereas a literalist approach identifies the Quran as the Logos—a perspective that became the source of a religious-philosophical movement, which also gave its name to the tradition of kalam. (Note: While traditional Islamic sources attribute the origin of the term kalām primarily to internal disputations over the divine speech (kalām Allāh) and dialectical exchanges (idārat al-kalām), comparative religion and modern scholarship (such as Harry A. Wolfson and Josef van Ess) contextualize the formation of Ilm al-Kalām within the broader Late Antique milieu. The central debates surrounding the uncreated or created nature of the Quran closely mirror the Hellenistic and Patristic evolution of the Logos concept.) So, its nature and whether it was created became a matter of fierce debate among religious scholars; and with the involvement of the political authority in the discussions, some Muslim religious scholars who stood against the political stance faced religious persecution during the caliph al-Ma'mun period and the following years.

=== Socio-political reverberations ===
The textual status of the Quran—and its elevation within Islam to the position of "God’s eternal, immutable, and uncreated word"—reached its zenith through a series of evolutionary processes and theological crises. In the process, it transformed into a versatile instrument serving various purposes across different segments of society, including rulers, the ulama, and the general public. For rulers, the Quran served as a foundation for legitimacy, helping to forge identity, a sense of belonging, and shared belief—both for themselves and for the populace. For the ulama and the ruling elite, it functioned as a means to establish authority and maintain order. For the common people, it provided a framework that addressed their search for meaning and created a social environment within which they could navigate their own struggles for existence.

Despite this broad socio-political utility, the text itself does not constitute a comprehensive legal code or prescribe a specific institutional model of governance. Out of more than six thousand verses, only a relatively small fraction addresses explicit legal matters (ahkam), primarily concerning family, inheritance, and basic criminal regulations, while its political references remain largely confined to broad ethical principles such as justice (adl) and consultation (shura). Consequently, throughout classical Islamic history, substantive law and state administration were developed primarily through the juristic interpretations of the ulama (fiqh), prophetic traditions (hadith), and the pragmatic administrative decrees of rulers rather than direct scriptural legislation. Alongside this, tendencies ranging from medieval Zahirism —following the literalist trajectory of early Kharijism— to contemporary Radical Islamic movements and conservative popular piety entirely exclude contextual interpretation, viewing it as a risk to the text's divine nature, and instead treat its literal injunctions as self-sufficient rules that must be directly applied.

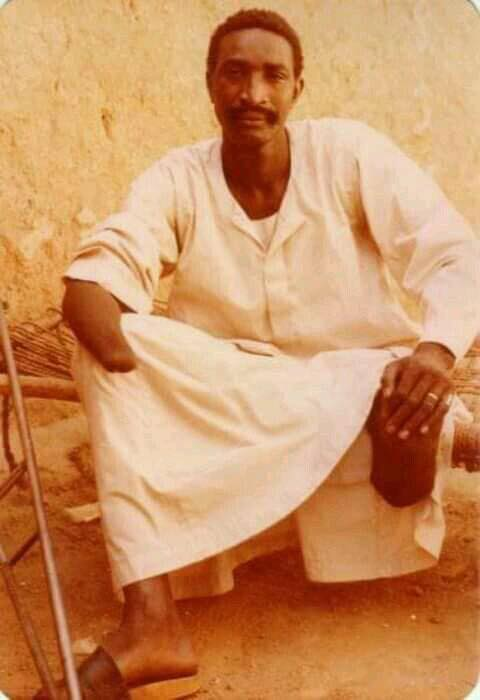
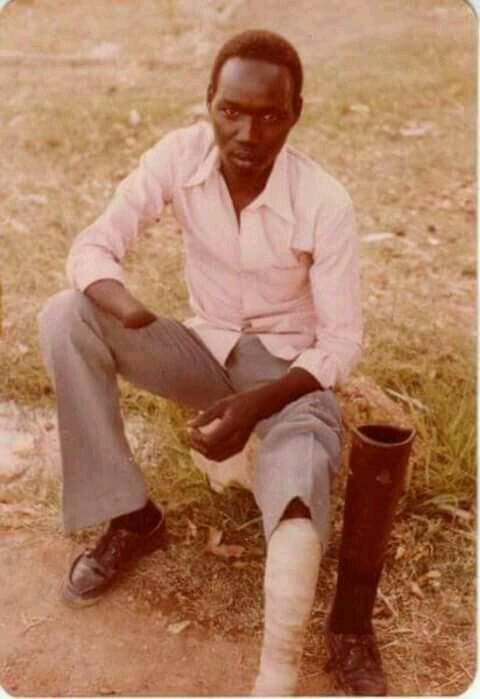
Cross amputation survivors, 1983 Sudan; A concrete manifestation of the hirabah penalty enforced under Jaafar Nimeiry’s September Laws, derived from a literal reading of Quran 5:33; illustrate the consequences of presenting the Quran as a timeless, immutable legal code, stripped of its historical context as well as the imposition of an irreversible, physical penalty for an abstract crime.

Although the constitutions of most Muslim-majority states contain references to sharia, its rules are largely preserved only in family law and criminal law in some. In the modern ea the rise of political Islam introduced a fundamental shift in how the Quran’s legislative and administrative qualifications were conceptualized. Responding to European colonialism and the emergence of the modern nation-state, 20th-century Islamist thinkers —such as Abul A'la Maududi and Sayyid Qutb— reinterpreted the Quran not merely as a source of moral guidance mediated by classical jurisprudence, but as an all-encompassing ideological manifesto and a direct constitutional blueprint for an Islamic state grounded in divine sovereignty (hakimiyyah). The Islamic revival brought calls for the full implementation of sharia, including corporal punishment such as stoning for adultery, through a variety of propaganda methods, from civic political activities to terrorism.

=== Recitation ===
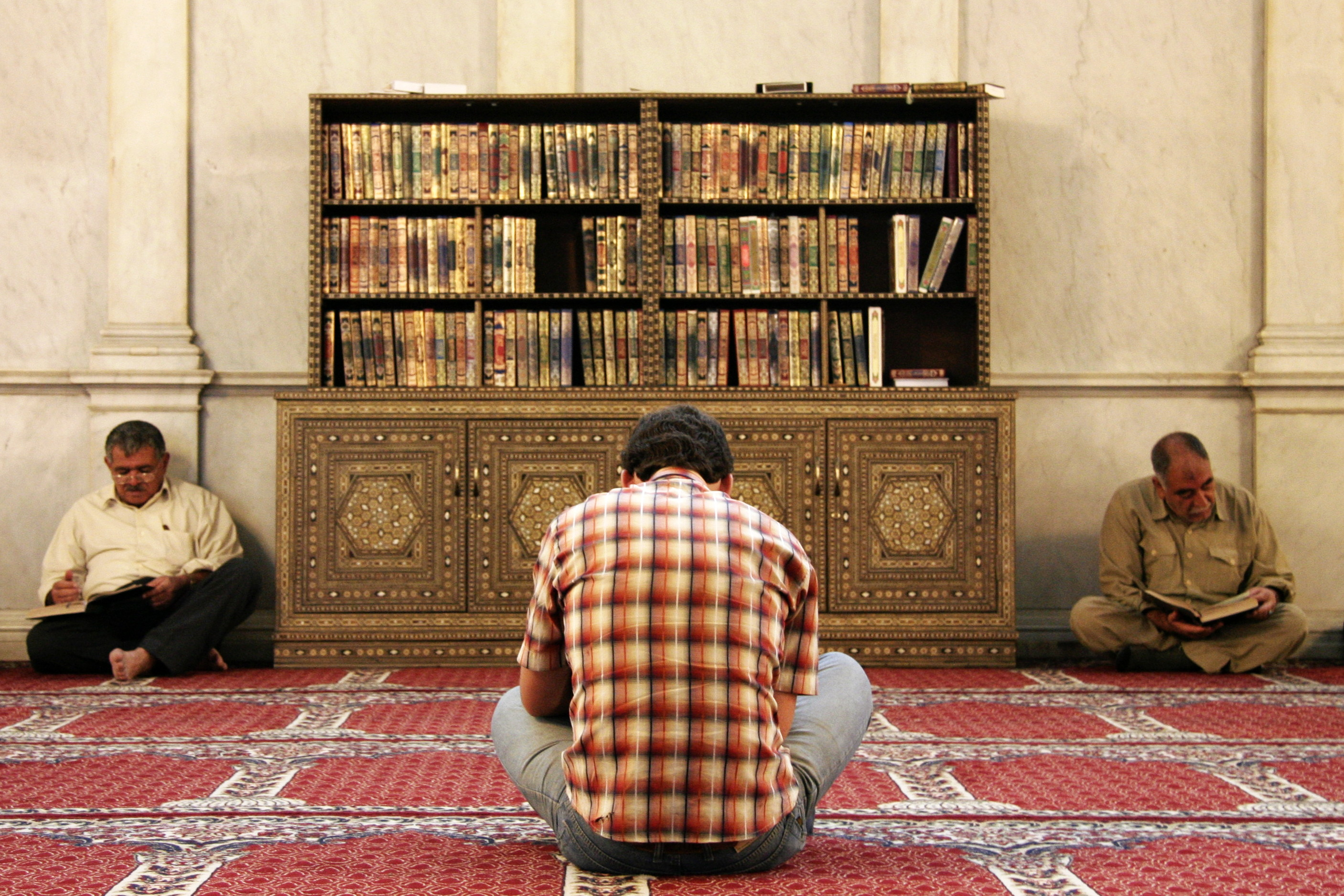
Men reading the Quran at the Umayyad Mosque, Damascus, Syria

The proper recitation of the Quran is the subject of a separate discipline named tajwid which determines in detail how the Quran should be recited, how each individual syllable is to be pronounced, the need to pay attention to the places where there should be a pause, to elisions, where the pronunciation should be long or short, where letters should be sounded together and where they should be kept separate, etc. It may be said that this discipline studies the laws and methods of the proper recitation of the Quran and covers three main areas: the proper pronunciation of consonants and vowels (the articulation of the Quranic phonemes), the rules of pause in recitation and of resumption of recitation, and the musical and melodious features of recitation.

In order to avoid incorrect pronunciation, reciters follow a program of training with a qualified teacher. The two most popular texts used as references for tajwid rules are Matn al-Jazariyyah by Ibn al-Jazari and Tuhfat al-Atfal by Sulayman al-Jamzuri.

The recitations of a few Egyptian reciters, like El Minshawy, Al-Hussary, Abdul Basit, Mustafa Ismail, were highly influential in the development of current styles of recitation. Southeast Asia is well known for world-class recitation, evidenced in the popularity of the woman reciters such as Maria Ulfah of Jakarta. Today, crowds fill auditoriums for public Quran recitation competitions.

There are generally two types of recitation (based on pace of recitation):

1. Murattal is a recitation at moderate pace, used for study and practice.
2. Mujawwad refers to a slower recitation that deploys heightened technical artistry and melodic modulation, as in public performances by trained experts. It is directed to and dependent upon an audience for the mujawwad reciter seeks to involve the listeners.

==== In worship ====
In Islam, most intellectual disciplines, including Islamic theology, philosophy, mysticism and jurisprudence, have been concerned with the Quran or have their foundation in its teachings. Muslims believe that the preaching or reading of the Quran is rewarded with divine rewards variously called ajr, thawab, or hasanat.

Respect for the written text of the Quran is an important element of religious faith by many Muslims, and the Quran is treated with reverence. Based on tradition and a literal interpretation of Quran 56:79 ("none shall touch but those who are clean"), some Muslims believe that they must perform a ritual cleansing with water (wudu or ghusl) before touching a copy of the Quran, although this view is not universal.

Worn-out and old copies of the Quran are wrapped in a cloth and stored indefinitely in a safe place, buried in a mosque or a Muslim cemetery, or burned and the ashes buried or scattered over water. While praying, the Quran is only recited in Arabic.

Surah Al-Fatiha, the first chapter of the Quran, is recited in full in every rakat of salah and on other occasions. This sura, which consists of seven verses, is the most often recited surah of the Quran:

Al-Fatiha
Recitation of Al-Fatiha in mujawwad.

بِسْمِ ٱللَّهِ ٱلرَّحْمَٰنِ ٱلرَّحِيمِ
ٱلْحَمْدُ لِلَّهِ رَبِّ ٱلْعَٰلَمِينَ
ٱلرَّحْمَٰنِ ٱلرَّحِيمِ
مَٰلِكِ يَوْمِ ٱلدِّينِ
إِيَّاكَ نَعْبُدُ وَإِيَّاكَ نَسْتَعِينُ
ٱهْدِنَا ٱلصِّرَٰطَ ٱلْمُسْتَقِيمَ
صِرَٰطَ ٱلَّذِينَ أَنْعَمْتَ عَلَيْهِمْ غَيْرِ ٱلْمَغْضُوبِ عَلَيْهِمْ وَلَا ٱلضَّآلِّينَ

— Quran 1:1-7
Translation:

In the Name of Allah the Entirely Merciful, the Especially Merciful.
[All] praise is [due] to Allah, Lord of the worlds —
The Entirely Merciful, the Especially Merciful,
Sovereign of the Day of Recompense.
It is You we worship and You we ask for help
Guide us to the straight path—
The path of those upon whom You have bestowed favor, not of those who have evoked [Your] anger or of those who are astray.

— Sahih International English translation

Other sections of the Quran of choice are also read in daily prayers. Sura Al-Ikhlāṣ is second in frequency of Quran recitation, for according to many early authorities, Muhammad said that Ikhlāṣ is equivalent to one-third of the whole Quran.

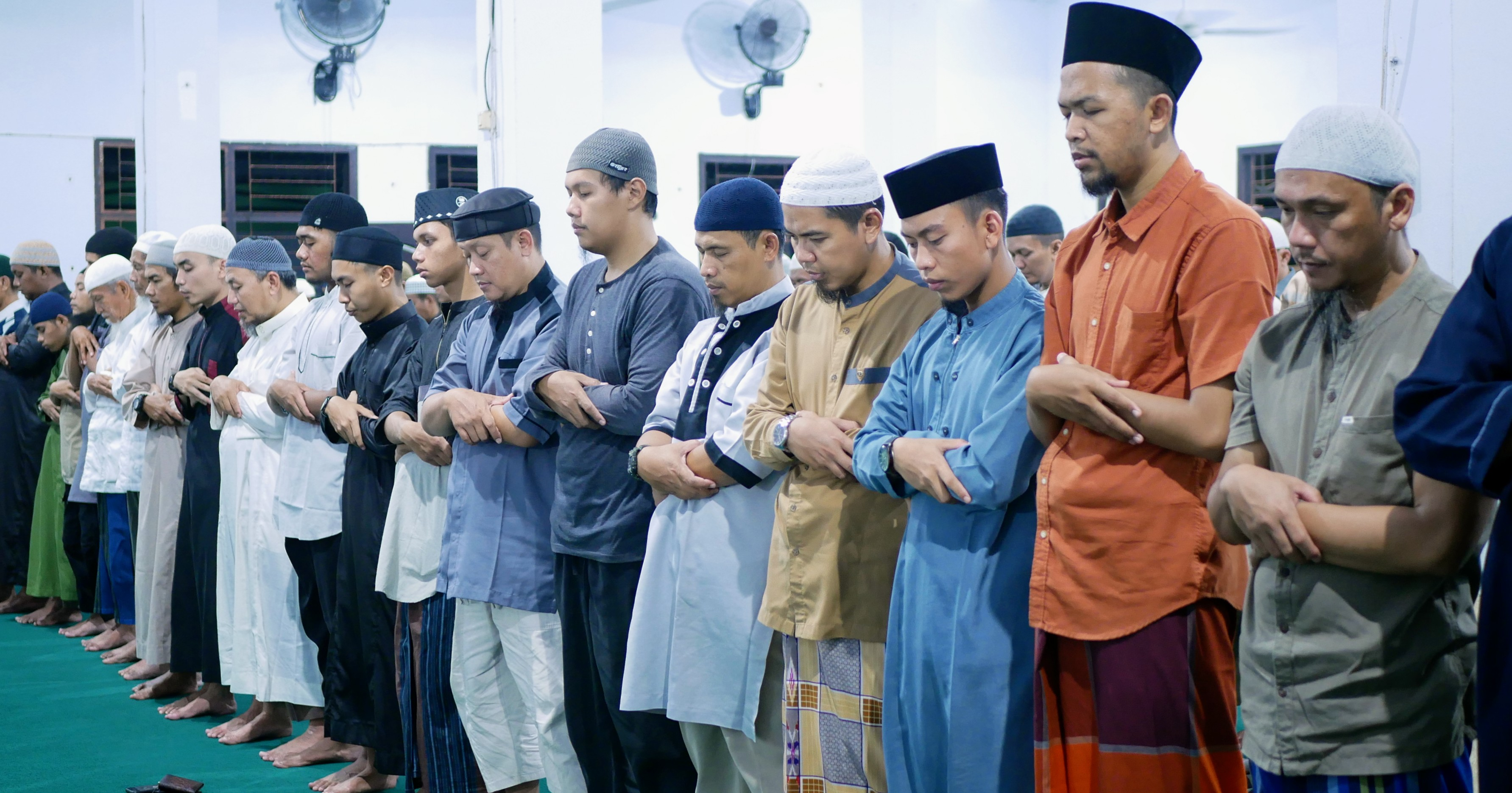
While standing in prayers, worshipers recite the first chapter of the Quran, al-Fatiha, followed by any other section

قُلۡ هُوَ ٱللَّهُ أَحَدٌ
ٱللَّهُ ٱلصَّمَدُ
لَمۡ یَلِدۡ وَلَمۡ یُولَدۡ
وَلَمۡ یَكُن لَّهُۥ كُفُوًا أَحَدُۢ

— Surah Al-Ikhlāṣ 112:1-4
Translation:

Say, ˹O Prophet,˺ "He is God—One ˹and Indivisible˺;
God—the Sustainer ˹needed by all˺.
He has never had offspring, nor was He born.
And there is none comparable to Him."

— The Clear Quran English translation

=== In Islamic art ===
The Quran also inspired Islamic arts and specifically the so-called Quranic arts of calligraphy and illumination. The Quran is never decorated with figurative images, but many Qurans have been highly decorated with decorative patterns in the margins of the page, or between the lines or at the start of suras. Islamic verses appear in many other media, on buildings and on objects of all sizes, such as mosque lamps, metal work, pottery and single pages of calligraphy for muraqqas or albums.

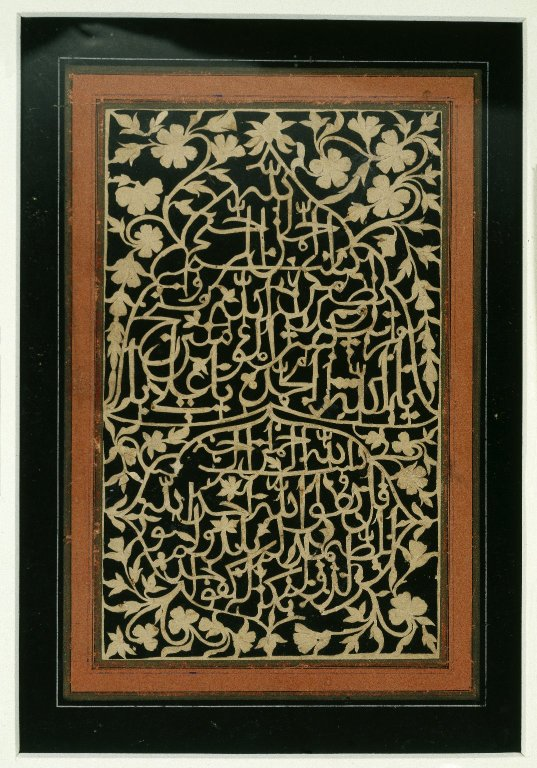
Calligraphy, 18th century, Brooklyn Museum.

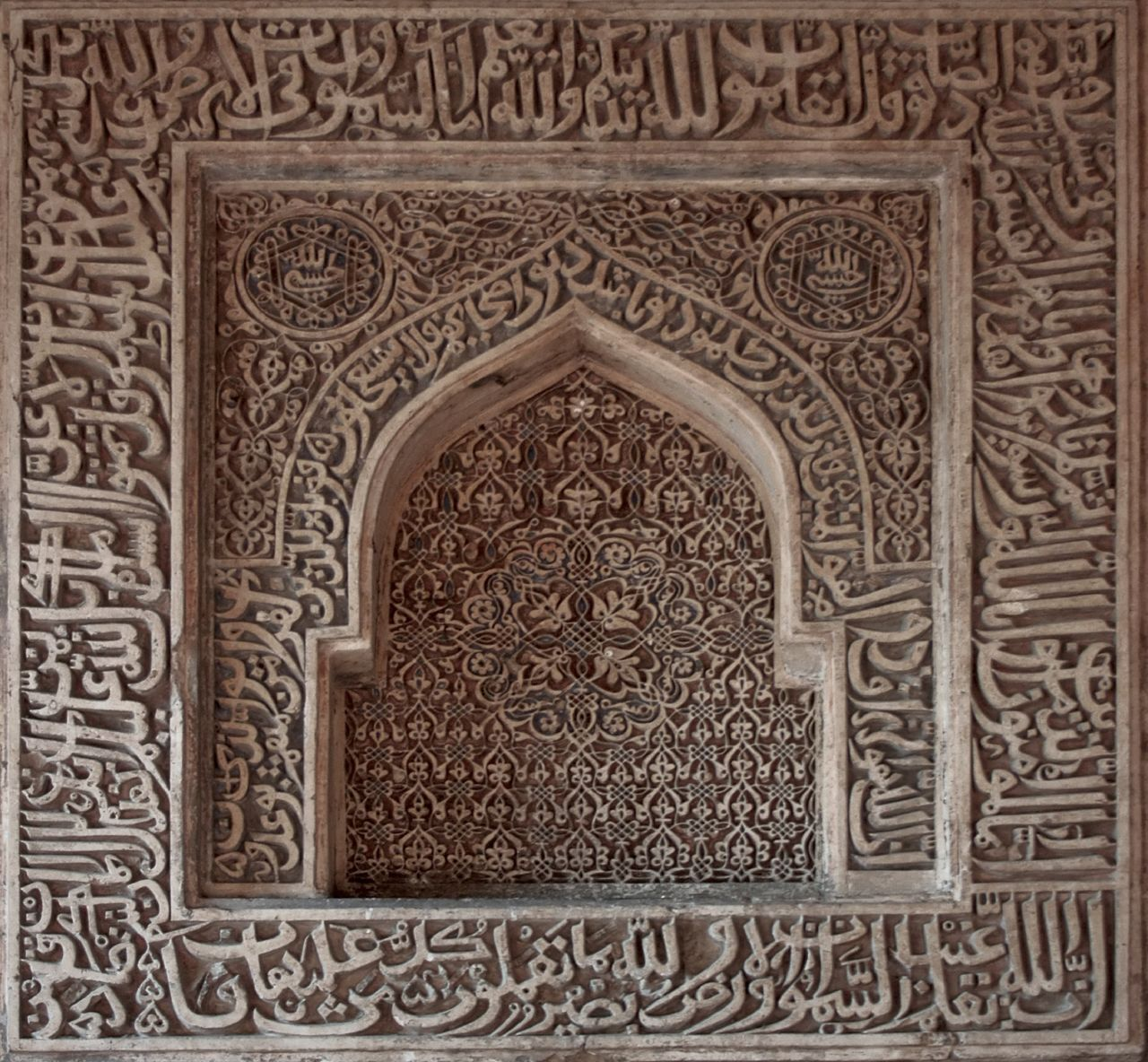
Quranic inscriptions, Bara Gumbad mosque, Delhi, India.

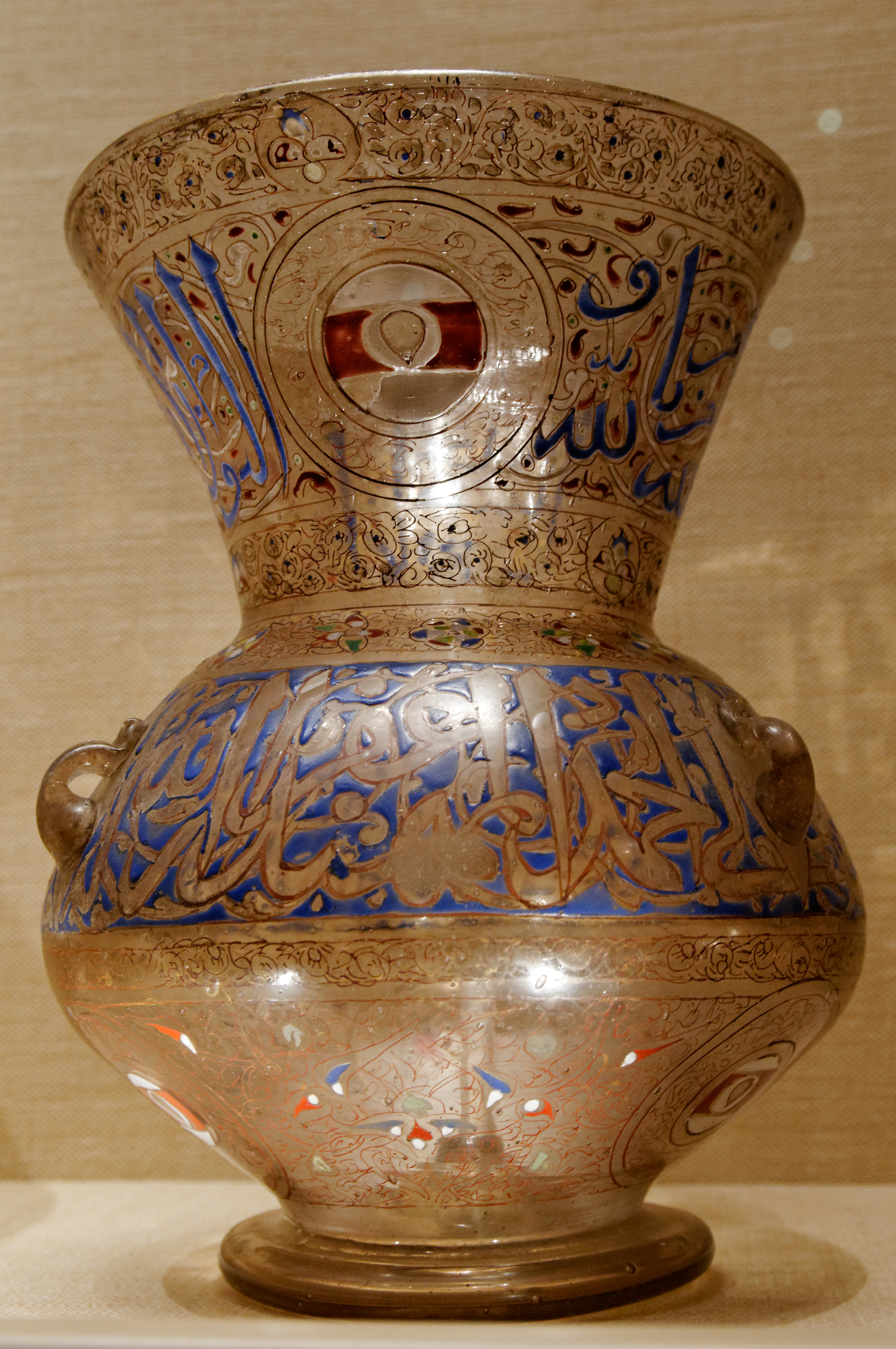
Typical mosque lamp, of enamelled glass, with the Ayat an-Nur or "Verse of Light" (24:35).

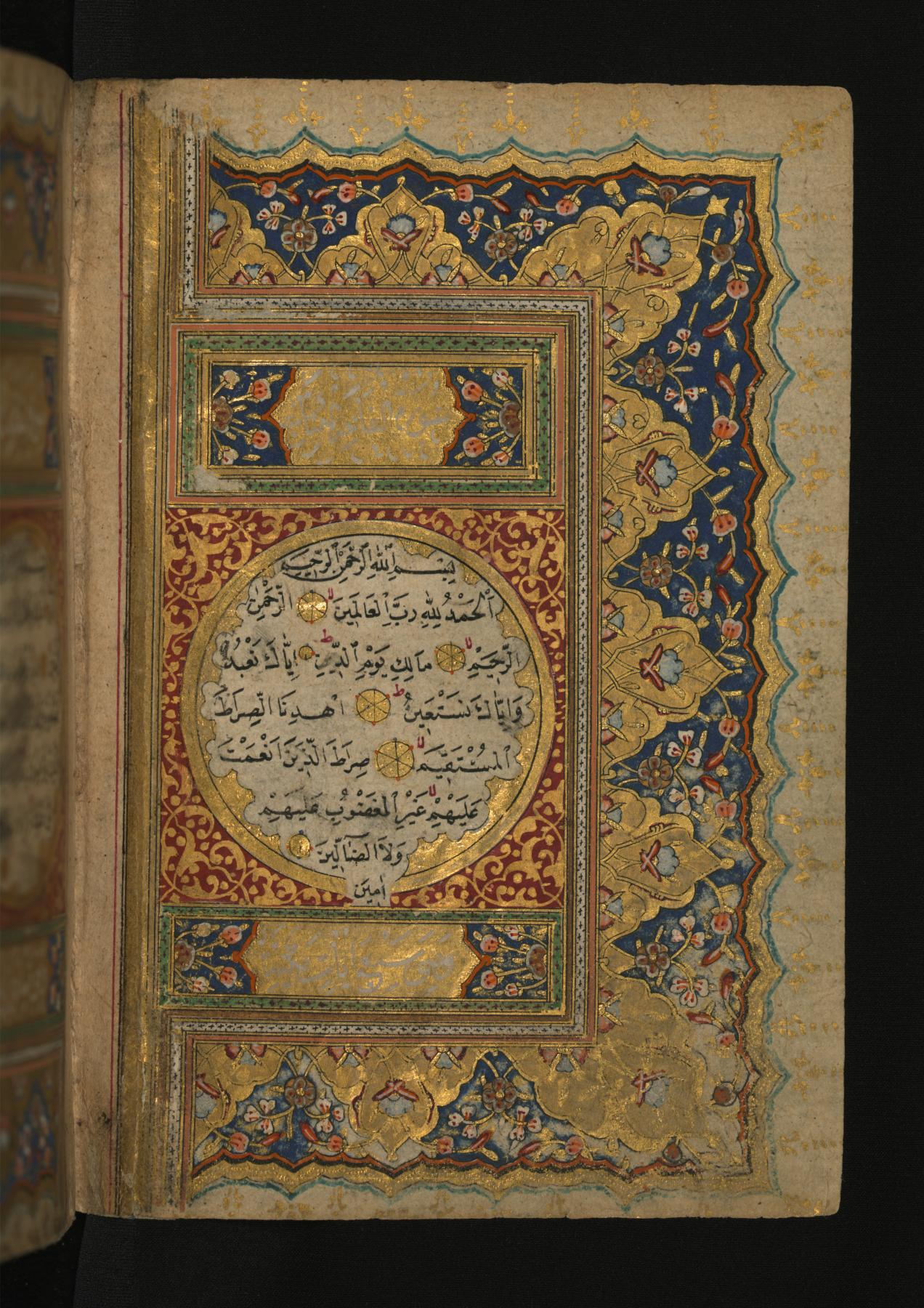
Quran page decoration art, Ottoman period.

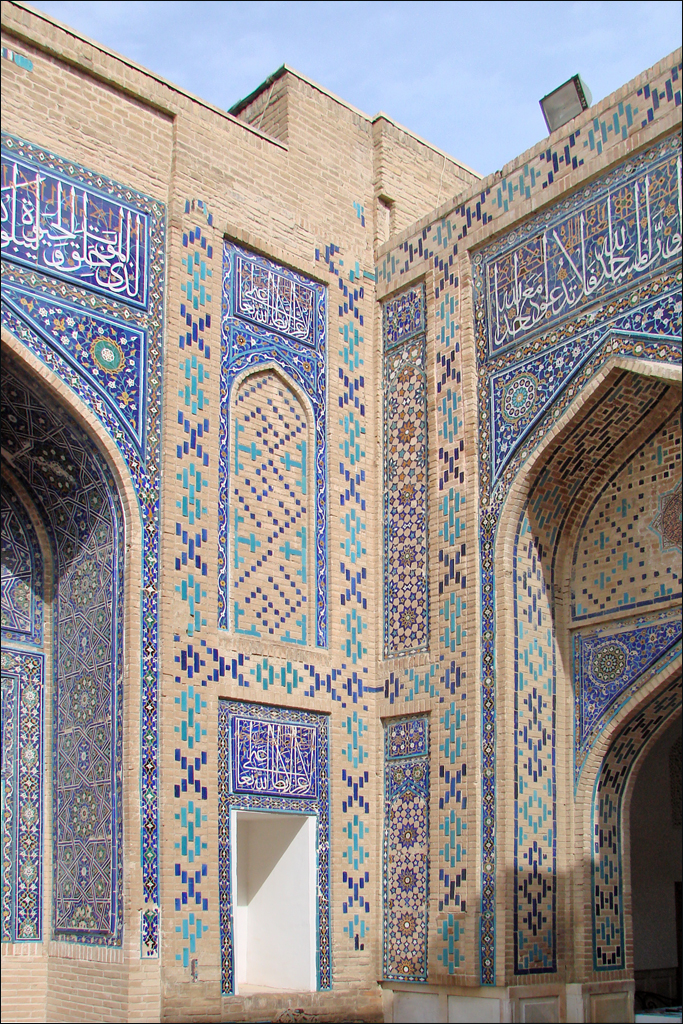
Quranic verses, Shahizinda mausoleum, Samarkand, Uzbekistan.

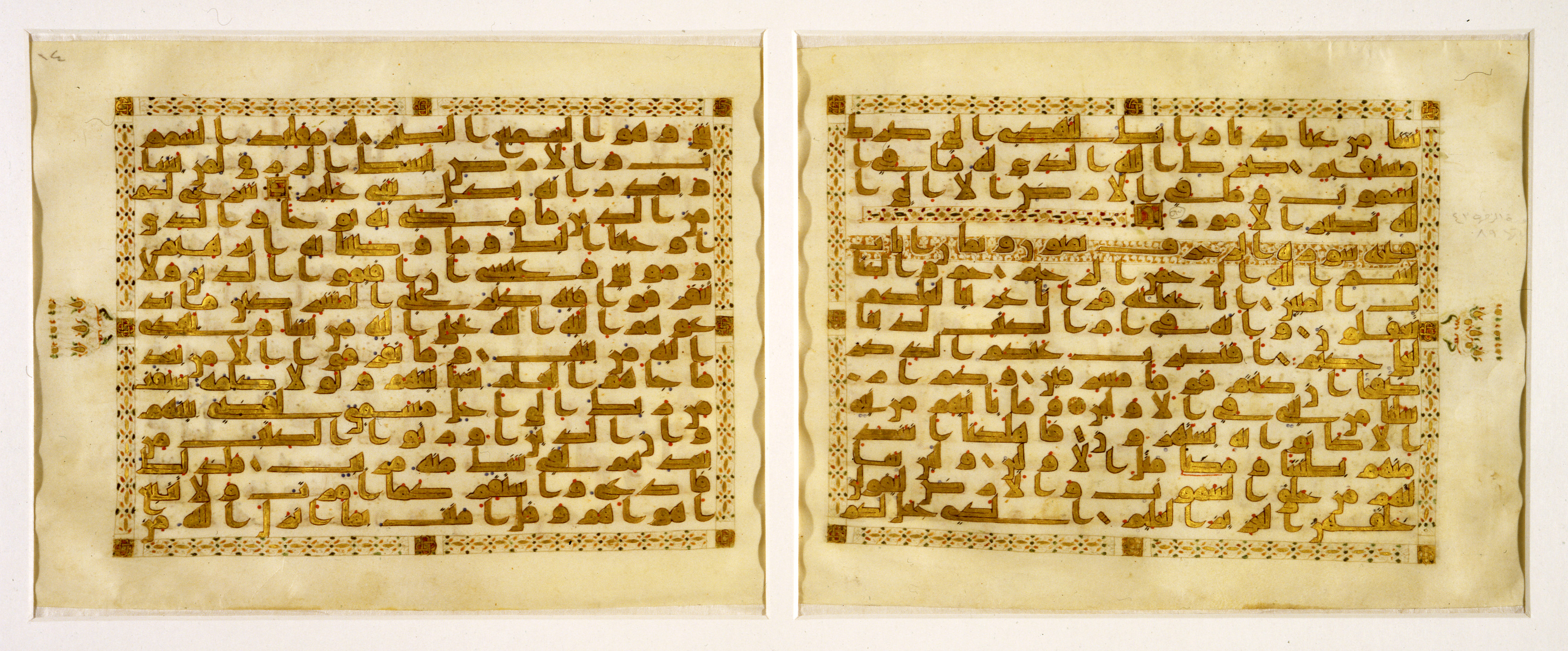
The leaves from Quran written in gold and contoured with brown ink with a horizontal format suited to classical Kufic calligraphy, which became common under the early Abbasid caliphs.

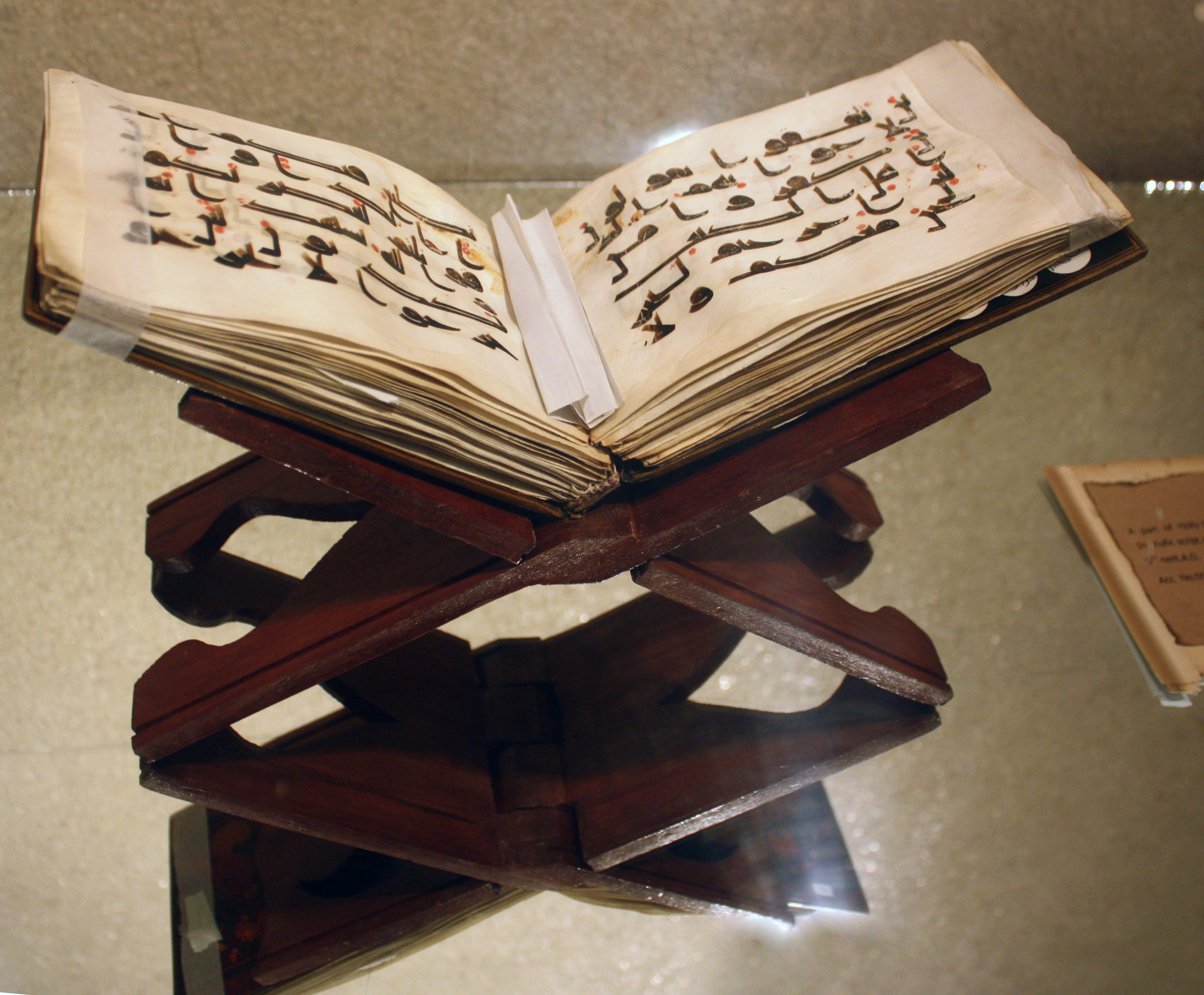
9th-century Quran in the Reza Abbasi Museum

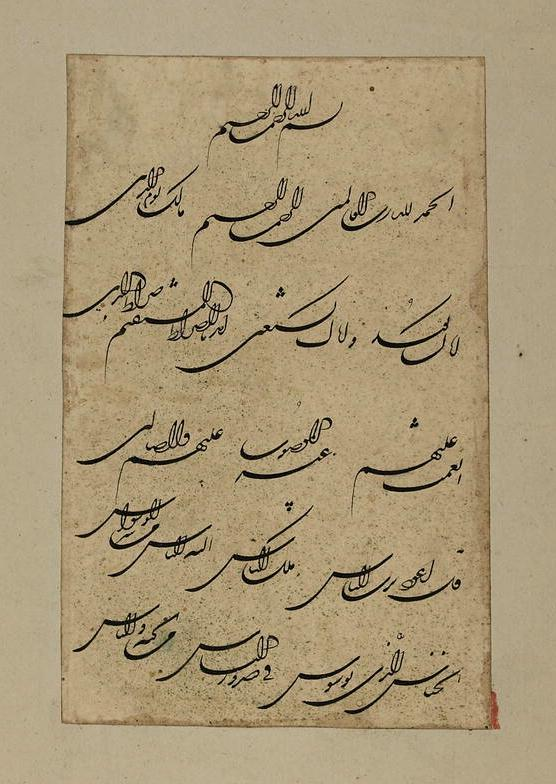
Shikasta nastaliq script, 18th–19th centuries

== Relationship with other literature ==
Some non-Muslim groups such as the Baháʼí Faith and Druze view the Quran as holy. In the Baháʼí Faith, the Quran is accepted as authentic revelation from God along with the revelations of the other world religions, Islam being viewed as a stage within the divine process of progressive revelation. Bahá'u'lláh, the Prophet-Founder of the Baháʼí Faith, wrote about the Quran. Unitarian Universalists may also seek inspiration from the Quran. It has been suggested that the Quran has some narrative similarities to the Diatessaron, Protoevangelium of James, Infancy Gospel of Thomas, Gospel of Pseudo-Matthew and the Arabic Infancy Gospel. One scholar has suggested that the Diatessaron, as a gospel harmony, may have led to the conception that the Christian Gospel is one text.

=== Relationship with Jewish and Christian texts ===
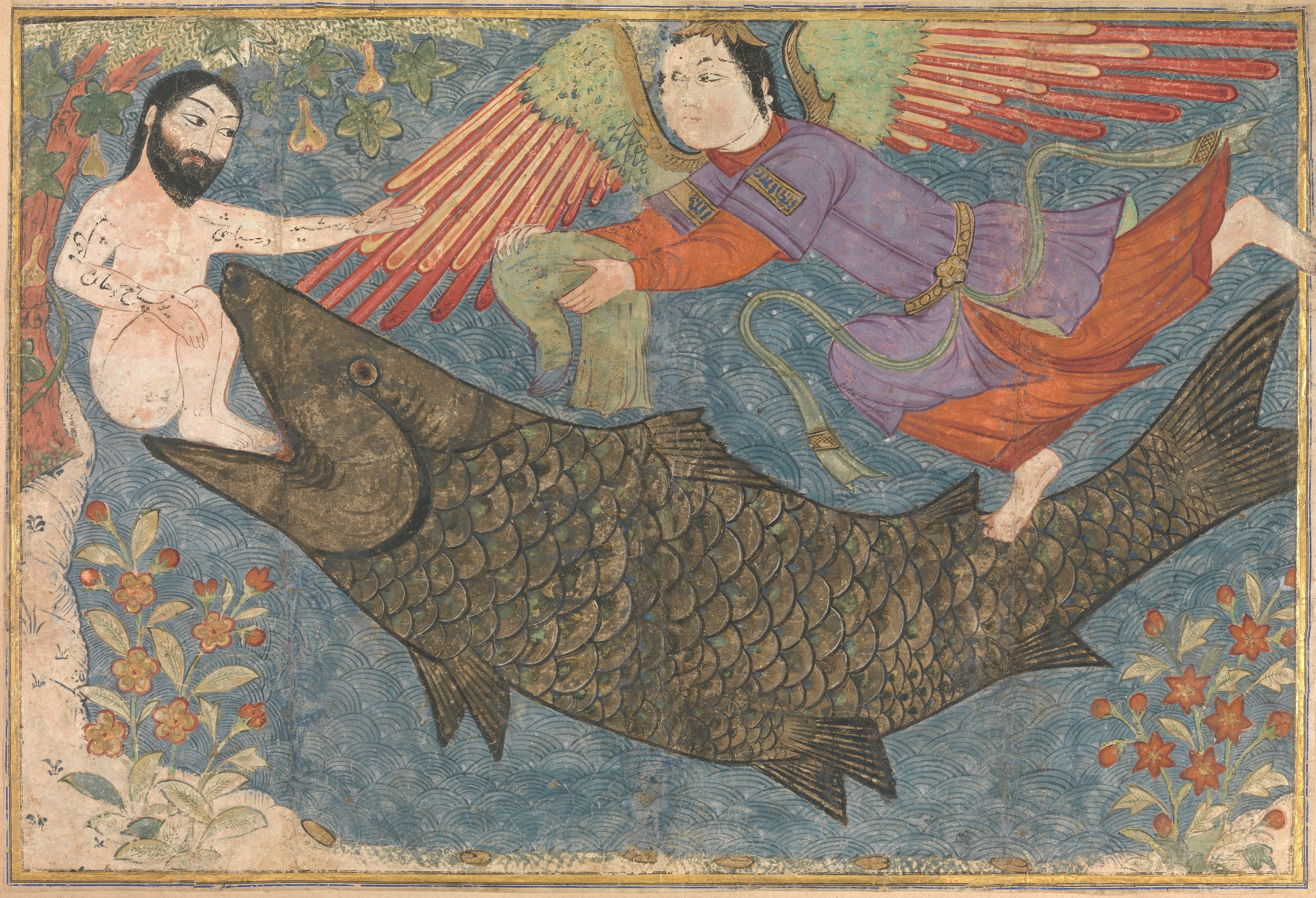
Jonah and the giant fish in the Jami' al-tawarikh, Metropolitan Museum. A common folktale finds its place in the Surah As-Saaffat 37:139 as well as in other sacred texts and can be traced in Oannes, Indian yogi Matsyendranatha, and the Greek hero Jason.

The Quran attributes its relationship with former books (the Torah, or Tawrāh and the Gospel, or ʾInjīl) to their unique origin, saying all of them have been revealed by Allah. In the Quran, the Tawrah corresponds to a text or scripture given to Moses and the Injil corresponds to the texts given to Jesus or even to the New Testament or the entire Christian Bible or canon. The Quran explicitly names the Torah, Gospel and Psalms as distinct entities (Surah 3:3-4, Surah 4:163, Surah 5:44-46) as well as references to "the ancient scriptures, the scriptures of Abraham and Moses" (Surah 87:18–19; Surah 53:36–37). Many today believe it asserts that Jews and Christians have corrupted it through falsification and alteration (Taḥrīf). However, others state that the Quran shows deep reverence for these scriptures as preserved both essentially as we have them today and at the time of the prophet; and that many major interpreters of the Quran (tafsir) did as well, with any issues being over interpretation instead of textual corruption. A study of Muslim views of the Bible in the first four centuries observed that positive views of preservation of previous scriptures is prevalent in the Quran itself, even in the few verses expressing a negative view, and among early commentators due to the belief that Muhammad was in the previous scriptures. Analysis of early commentaries (tafsir) on the Quranic understanding of tampering of previous scriptures indicate that at the beginning even the words commentators used to describe tampering did not imply or mean textual corruption, as Muhammad was understood to be in the Torah, at least. Biblical scholars note that the manuscript evidence of the New Testament verifies that it was the same as in the time of Muhammad and before, so a dilemma between the revelations by the same deity emerges.

According to Christoph Luxenberg (in The Syro-Aramaic Reading of the Koran) the Quran's language was similar to the Syriac language. The Quran recounts stories of many of the people and events recounted in Jewish and Christian sacred books (Tanakh, Bible) and devotional literature (Apocrypha, Midrash), although it differs in many details. Adam, Enoch, Noah, Eber, Shelah, Abraham, Lot, Ishmael, Isaac, Jacob, Joseph, Job, Jethro, David, Solomon, Elijah, Elisha, Jonah, Aaron, Moses, Zechariah, John the Baptist and Jesus are mentioned in the Quran as prophets of God (see Prophets of Islam). In fact, Moses is mentioned more in the Quran than any other individual. Jesus is mentioned more often in the Quran than Muhammad (by name—Muhammad is often alluded to as "The Prophet" or "The Apostle"), while Mary is mentioned in the Quran more than in the New Testament.

The Quran is highly saturated in biblical traditions yet, it is unlikely that Muhammad or his audience had access to written copies of the Bible and other Jewish and Christian literature since direct quotes are quite rare. Instead the Quran often paraphrases, alludes to, and echoes these biblical narratives showing evidence of limited engagement with written texts, whether Biblical, extra-Biblical, or post-Biblical. Most of these biblical traditions reached Muhammad and his followers in oral form. The Quran does not just borrow biblical stories, but changes and elaborates on some of them, often reflecting engagement with Christian versions of stories than other groups.

=== Relationship with Arab writing ===
After the Quran, and the general rise of Islam, the Arabic alphabet developed rapidly into an art form. The Arabic grammarian Sibawayh wrote one of the earliest books on Arabic grammar, referred to as "Al-Kitab", which relied heavily on the language in the Quran. Wadad Kadi, Professor of Near Eastern Languages and Civilizations at University of Chicago, and Mustansir Mir, Professor of Islamic studies at Youngstown State University, state that the Quran exerted a particular influence on Arabic literature's diction, themes, metaphors, motifs and symbols and added new expressions and new meanings to old, pre-Islamic words that would become ubiquitous.

== Criticism ==
Common criticisms of the Quran concern its questionable origins, imperfect textual and oral transmission, imperfect preservation, pre-existing sources that the Quran relies upon, internal inconsistency, and ethical teachings.

No critical text of the Quran, based on manuscript analysis, has ever been made and this is considered problematic since all other ancient and even sacred literature have been studied for accuracy. Textual critics state that based on the diversity found in the manuscript evidence, the editing after Muhammad's death, early purges of variants, early standardization attempts (e.g. 653–705 AD and 936 AD), along with other factors leads to the view that there "never was one original text of the Qur’ān." Scholars argue that the earliest Muslims had a confusing understanding of Muhammad's message and that the emergence of multiple conflicting traditions exhibit many attempts to make sense of the chaos of composition, including examples of dependence on Christian and Jewish texts.

The Quran's oral formation and written transmission, before and after Muhammad, has been questioned on the grounds of variants in manuscripts, the existence of numerous early contradictory narratives of how the Quran was composed, and early sources themselves discussing actual variants from even the followers of Muhammad. Sunni and Shia sects of Islam have competing and contradictory narratives of origins of the Quran which cannot be reconciled. Early sources by non-Muslims indicate that there was no Quran at the time of Muhammad since early Christian and Jewish sources on Islam show no awareness of a unique Muslim scripture during Muhammad's lifetime.

Regarding the claim of eternal divine origin of the Quran, critical scholars state that the Quran shows reliance, borrowing and usage of pre-existing sources that are not only taken from the Bible, which are supposed to be older revelations of God, but also from heretic, Apocryphic and talmudic sources such as the Syriac Infancy Gospel and Gospel of James. The Quran acknowledges that accusations of borrowing popular ancient fables were being made against Muhammad.

== Writing and printing ==
=== Writing ===
Before printing was widely adopted in the 19th century, the Quran was transmitted in manuscripts made by calligraphers and copyists. The earliest manuscripts were written in Ḥijāzī-typescript. The Hijazi style manuscripts nevertheless confirm that transmission of the Quran in writing began at an early stage. Probably in the ninth century, scripts began to feature thicker strokes, which are traditionally known as Kufic scripts. Toward the end of the ninth century, new scripts began to appear in copies of the Quran and replace earlier scripts. The reason for discontinuation in the use of the earlier style was that it took too long to produce and the demand for copies was increasing. Copyists would therefore choose simpler writing styles. Beginning in the 11th century, the styles of writing employed were primarily the naskh, muhaqqaq, rayḥānī and, on rarer occasions, the thuluth script. Naskh was in very widespread use. In North Africa and Iberia, the Maghribī style was popular. More distinct is the Bihari script which was used solely in the north of India. Nastaʻlīq style was also rarely used in Persian world.

In the beginning, the Quran was not written with dots or tashkeel. These features were added to the text during the lifetimes of the last of the Sahabah. Since it would have been too costly for most Muslims to purchase a manuscript, copies of the Quran were held in mosques in order to make them accessible to people. These copies frequently took the form of a series of 30 parts or juzʼ. In terms of productivity, the Ottoman copyists provide the best example. This was in response to widespread demand, unpopularity of printing methods and for aesthetic reasons.

Whilst the majority of Islamic scribes were men, some women also worked as scholars and copyists; one such woman who made a copy of this text was the Moroccan jurist, Amina, bint al-Hajj ʿAbd al-Latif.

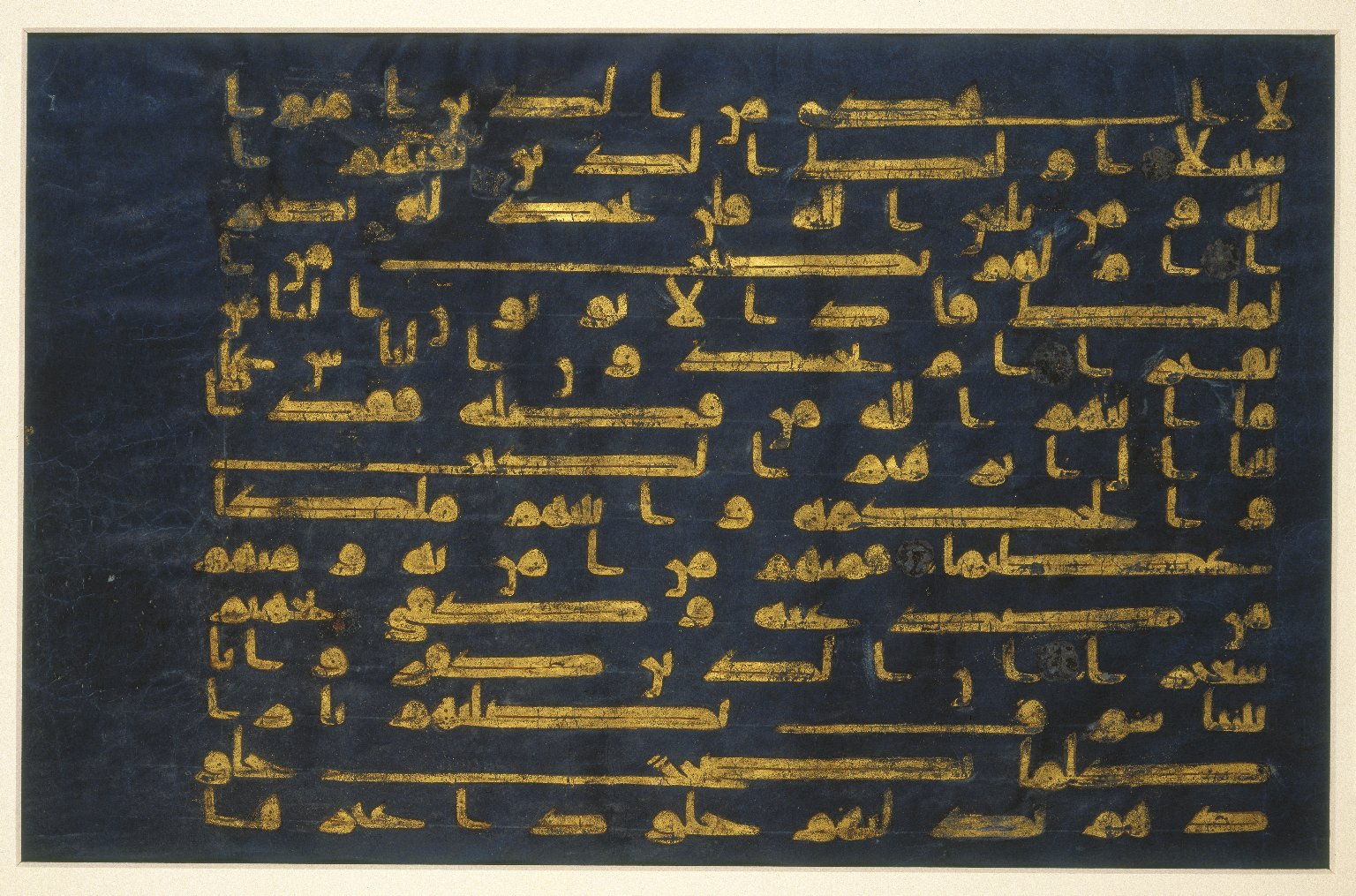
Folio from the "Blue" Quran at the Brooklyn Museum

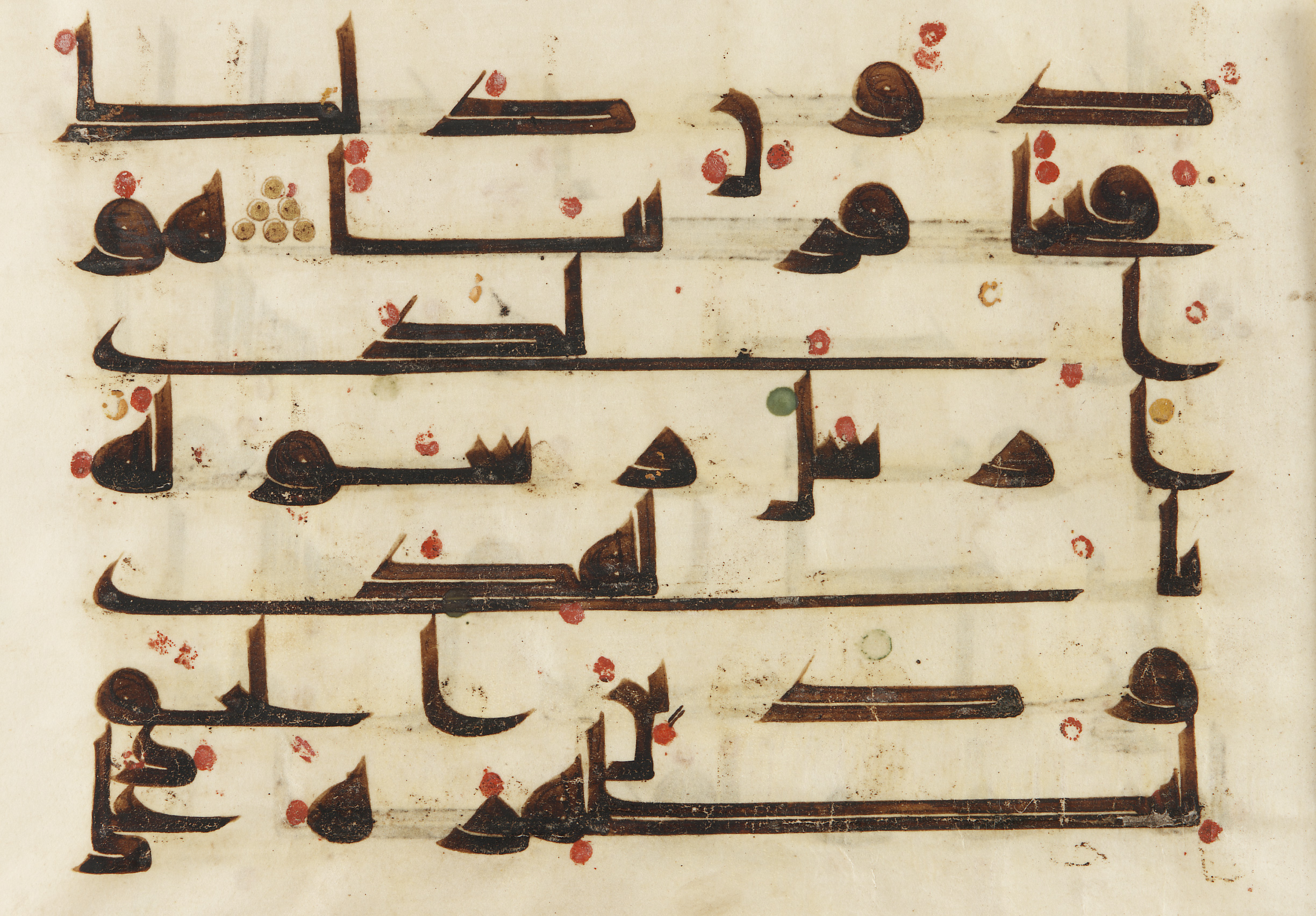
Kufic script, eighth or ninth century

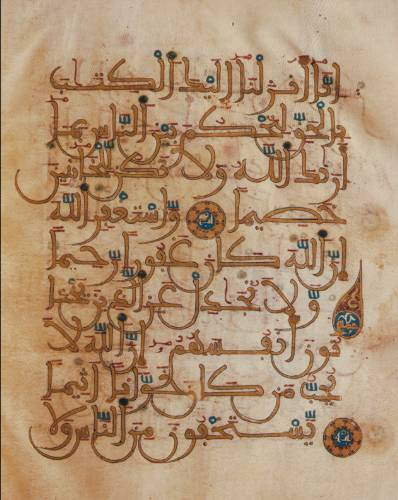
Maghribi script, 13th–14th centuries

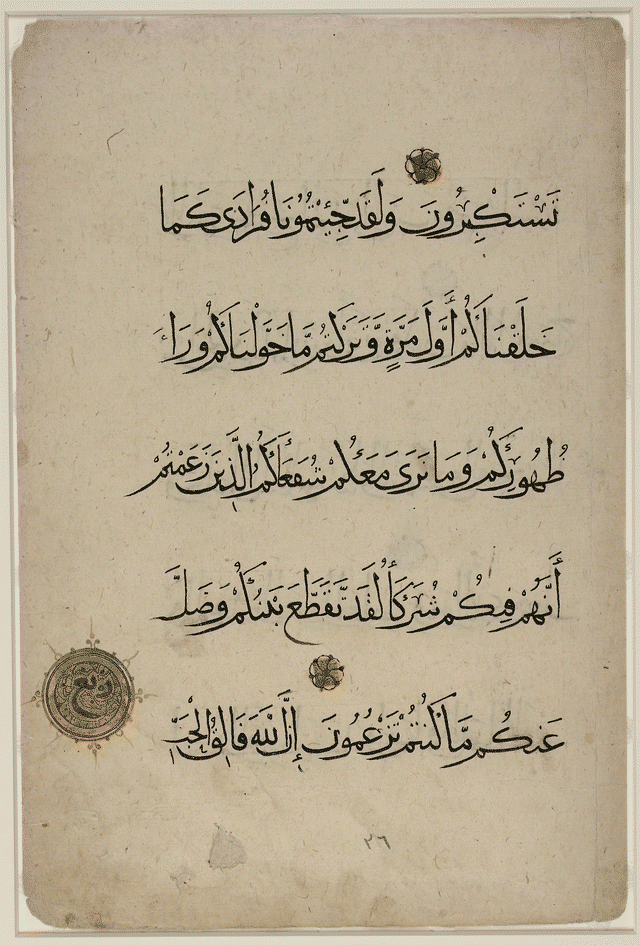
Muhaqqaq script, 14th–15th centuries

=== Printing ===
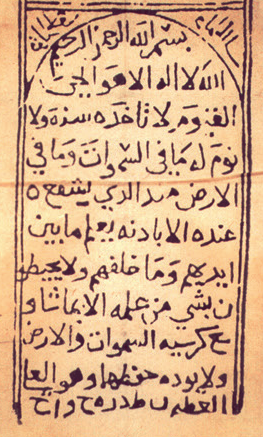
Ayat Al-Kursi printed on the last known tarsh print, 1444

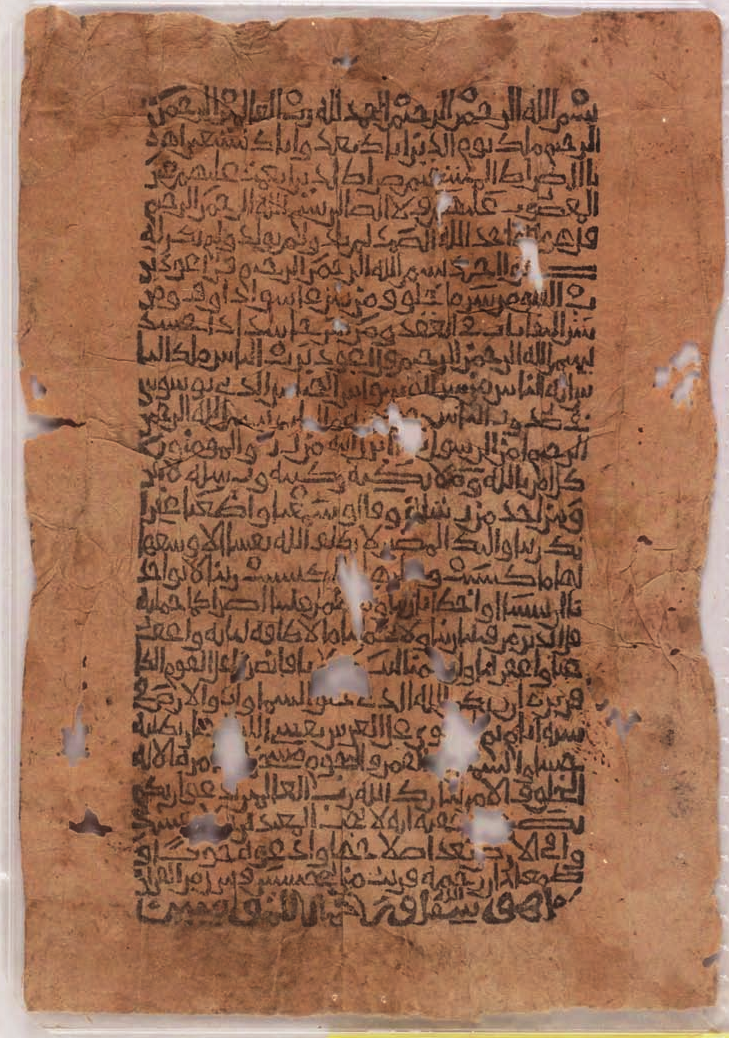
Medieval print with extracts from 7 different surahs, 11.8×16.9cm

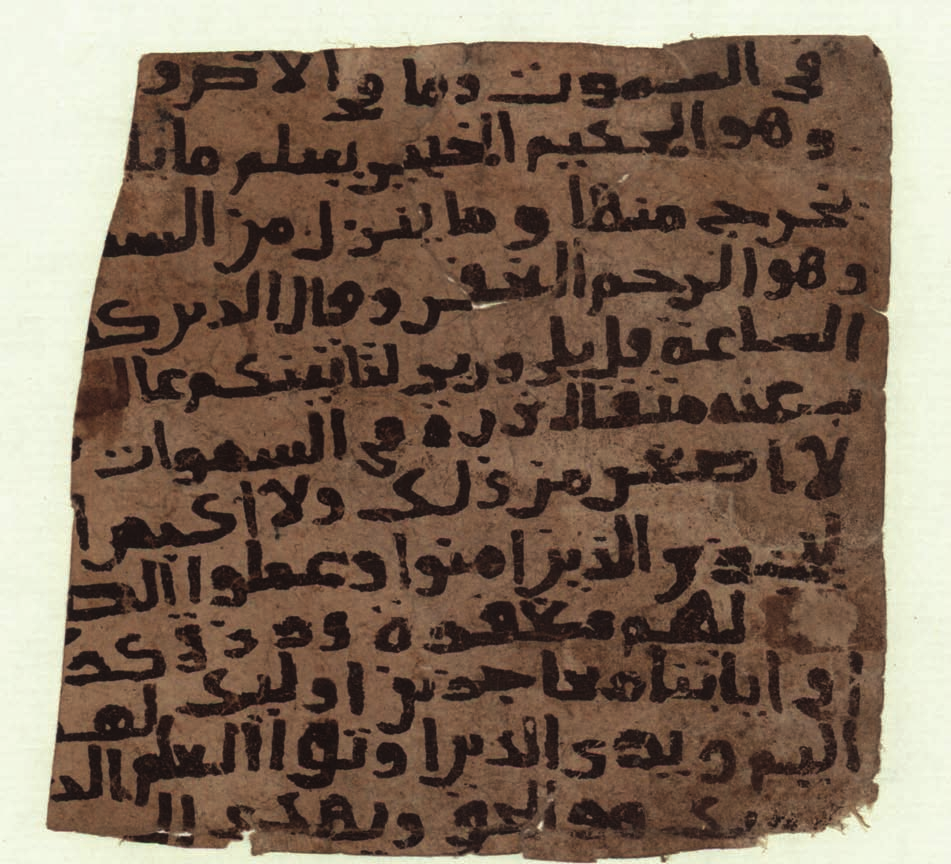
Print of the first 6 ayahs of Surah Saba

Woodblock printing of extracts from the Quran is on record as early as the 10th century. This technique was known as tarsh and it reached a high degree of complexity, printing letters only one milimeter in height, a remarkable technical achievement. Different scripts like Kufic, Naskh and Maghrebi were used, along with several colors like red, yellow and green. These printed quotations of the Quran were mainly used for protection talismans and amulets, but it was also used in the 13th century for printed hajj certificates. However, after 1444 the technique vanished for unknown reasons.

Arabic movable type printing was ordered by Pope Julius II (r. 1503–1512) for distribution among Middle Eastern Christians. The first complete Quran printed with movable type was produced in Venice in 1537–1538 for the Ottoman market by Paganino Paganini and Alessandro Paganini. But this Quran was not used as it contained a large number of errors. Two more editions include the Hinckelmann edition published by the pastor Abraham Hinckelmann in Hamburg in 1694, and the edition by the Italian priest Ludovico Maracci in Padua in 1698 with Latin translation and commentary.

Printed copies of the Quran during this period met with strong opposition from Muslim legal scholars: printing anything in Arabic was prohibited in the Ottoman empire between 1483 and 1726—initially, even on penalty of death. The Ottoman ban on printing in Arabic script was lifted in 1726 for non-religious texts only upon the request of Ibrahim Muteferrika, who printed his first book in 1729. Except for books in Hebrew and European languages, which were unrestricted, very few books, and no religious texts, were printed in the Ottoman Empire for another century. (Note: "[T]he major Ottoman printing houses published a combined total of only 142 books in more than a century of printing between 1727 and 1838. When taken in conjunction with the fact that only a minuscule number of copies of each book were printed, this statistic demonstrates that the introduction of the printing press did not transform Ottoman cultural life until the emergence of vibrant print media in the middle of the nineteenth century.")

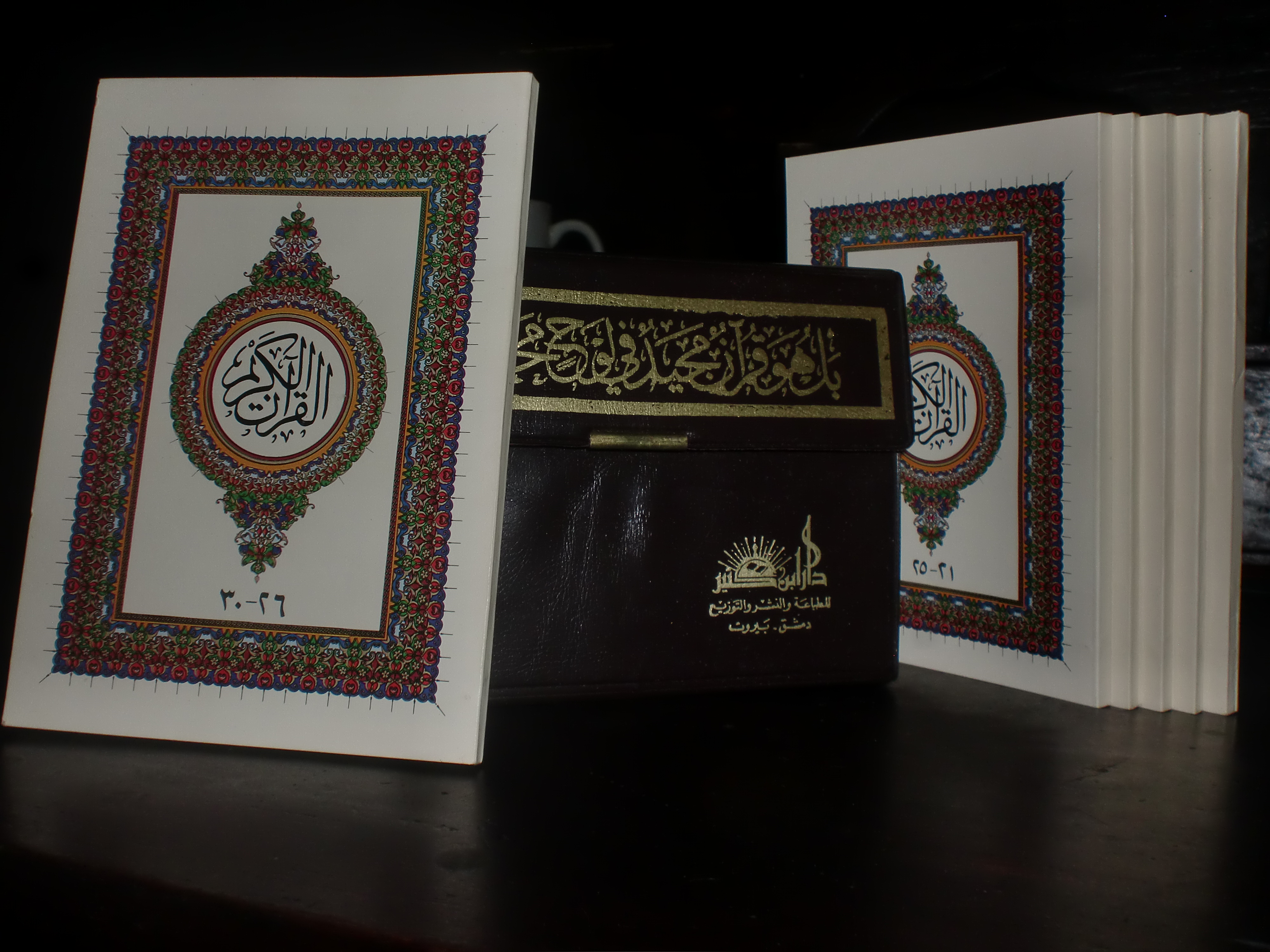
Quran divided into six books, published by Dar Ibn Kathir, Damascus-Beirut

In 1786, Catherine the Great of Russia, sponsored a printing press for "Tatar and Turkish orthography" in Saint Petersburg, with one Mullah Osman Ismail responsible for producing the Arabic types. A Quran was printed with this press in 1787, reprinted in 1790 and 1793 in Saint Petersburg, and in 1803 in Kazan. (Note: "at imperial expense, a 'Tatar and Turkish Typography' was established in St. Petersburg; a domestic scholar, Mullah Osman Ismail, was responsible for the manufacture of the types. One of the first products of this printing house was the Qur'ān. Through the doctor and writer, Johann Georg v. Zimmermann (d. 1795), who was befriended by Catherine II, a copy of the publication arrived in the Göttingen University library. Its director, the philologist Christian Gottlob Heyne (d. 1812), presented the work immediately in the Göttingische Anzeigen von gelehrten Sachen (28 July 1788); therein he pointed especially to the beauty of the Arabic types. To the Arabic text marginal glosses have been added that consist predominantly of reading variants. The imprint was reproduced unchanged in 1790 and 1793 in St. Petersburg (cf. Schnurrer, Bibliotheca arabica, no. 384); later, after the transfer of the printing house to Kazan, editions appeared in different formats and with varying presentation) The first edition printed in Iran appeared in Tehran (1828), a translation in Turkish was printed in Cairo in 1842, and the first officially sanctioned Ottoman edition was finally printed in Constantinople between 1875 and 1877 as a two-volume set, during the First Constitutional Era.

Gustav Flügel published an edition of the Quran in 1834 in Leipzig, which remained authoritative in Europe for close to a century, until Cairo's Al-Azhar University published an edition of the Quran in 1924. This edition was the result of a long preparation, as it standardized Quranic orthography, and it remains the basis of later editions.

== Translations ==
Translating the Quran has always been problematic and difficult. Many argue that the Quranic text cannot be reproduced in another language or form. An Arabic word may have a range of meanings depending on the context, making an accurate translation difficult. Moreover, one of the biggest difficulties in understanding the Quran for those who do not know its language in the face of shifts in linguistic usage over the centuries is semantic translations (meanings) that include the translator's contributions to the relevant text instead of literal ones. Although the author's contributions are often bracketed and shown separately, the author's individual tendencies may also come to the fore in making sense of the main text. These studies contain reflections and even distortions caused by the region, sect, education, ideology and knowledge of the people who made them, and efforts to reach the real content are drowned in the details of volumes of commentaries. These distortions can manifest themselves in many areas of belief and practices such as hijab. (Note: "Let them draw their veils over their chests" (surah-24:31) In Luxenberg's Syro-Aramaic Reading of the Koran, the verse instead commands women to "snap their belts around their waists." The belt was a sign of chastity in the Christian world. According to him, the meanings of the words in the relevant part of the verse are as follows:خِمار Khimar; cummerbund, جيب jyb; sinus, sac, وَلْيَضْرِبْنَ;"let them hit") In fact, every new interpretation and translation of the Quran inherently involves a new semantic restructuring of it.

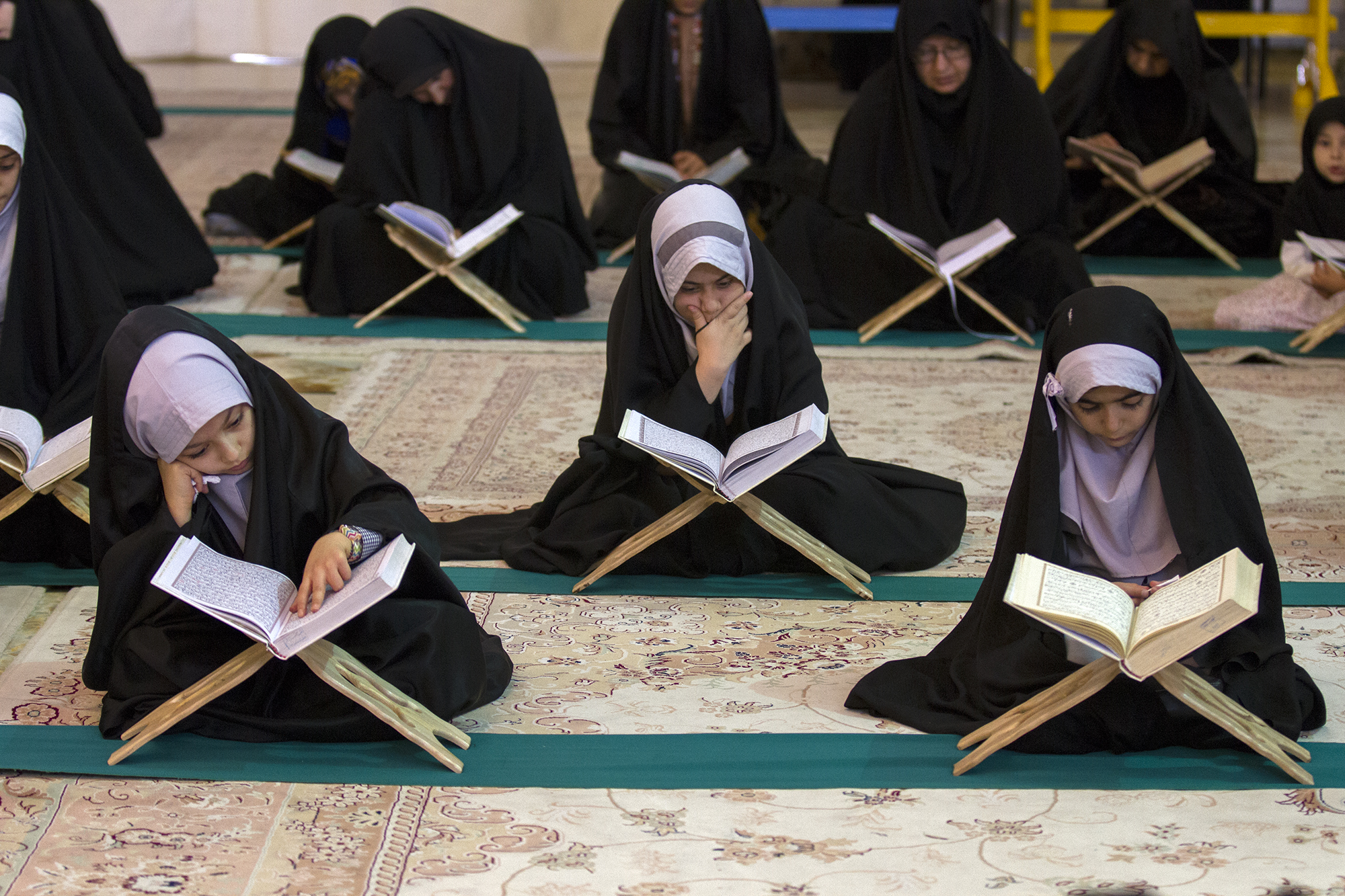
Shia Muslim girls reciting the Quran placed atop folding lecterns (rehal) during Ramadan in the city of Qom, Iran

Islamic tradition also holds that translations were made for Negus of Abyssinia and Byzantine Emperor Heraclius, as both received letters by Muhammad containing verses from the Quran. In early centuries, the permissibility of translations was not an issue, but whether one could use translations in prayer. The Quran has been translated into most African, Asian, and European languages. The first translator of the Quran was Salman the Persian, who translated surat al-Fatiha into Persian during the seventh century. Another translation of the Quran was completed in 884 in Alwar (Sindh, India, now Pakistan) by the orders of Abdullah bin Umar bin Abdul Aziz on the request of the Hindu Raja Mehruk.

The first fully attested complete translations of the Quran were done between the 10th and 12th centuries in Persian. The Samanid king, Mansur I (961–976), ordered a group of scholars from Khorasan to translate the Tafsir al-Tabari, originally in Arabic, into Persian. Later in the 11th century, one of the students of Abu Mansur Abdullah al-Ansari wrote a complete tafsir of the Quran in Persian. In the 12th century, Najm al-Din Abu Hafs al-Nasafi translated the Quran into Persian. The manuscripts of all three books have survived and have been published several times. In 1936, translations in 102 languages were known. In 2010, the Hürriyet Daily News and Economic Review reported that the Quran was presented in 112 languages at the 18th International Quran Exhibition in Tehran.

Robert of Ketton's 1143 translation of the Quran for Peter the Venerable, Lex Mahumet pseudoprophete, was the first into a Western language (Latin). Alexander Ross offered the first English version in 1649, from the French translation of L'Alcoran de Mahomet (1647) by Andre du Ryer. In 1734, George Sale produced the first scholarly translation of the Quran into English; another was produced by Richard Bell in 1937, and yet another by Arthur John Arberry in 1955. While all these translators were non-Muslims, there have been numerous translations by Muslims: popular modern English translations by Muslims include The Oxford World Classics translation by Muhammad Abdel Haleem, The Clear Quran by Mustafa Khattab, Sahih International's translation, among various others. As with translations of the Bible, the English translators have sometimes favored archaic English words and constructions over their more modern or conventional equivalents; for example, two widely read translators, Abdullah Yusuf Ali and Marmaduke Pickthall, use the plural and singular ye and thou instead of the more common you.

The oldest Gurmukhi translation of the Quran has been found in village Lande of Moga district of Indian Punjab which was printed in 1911.

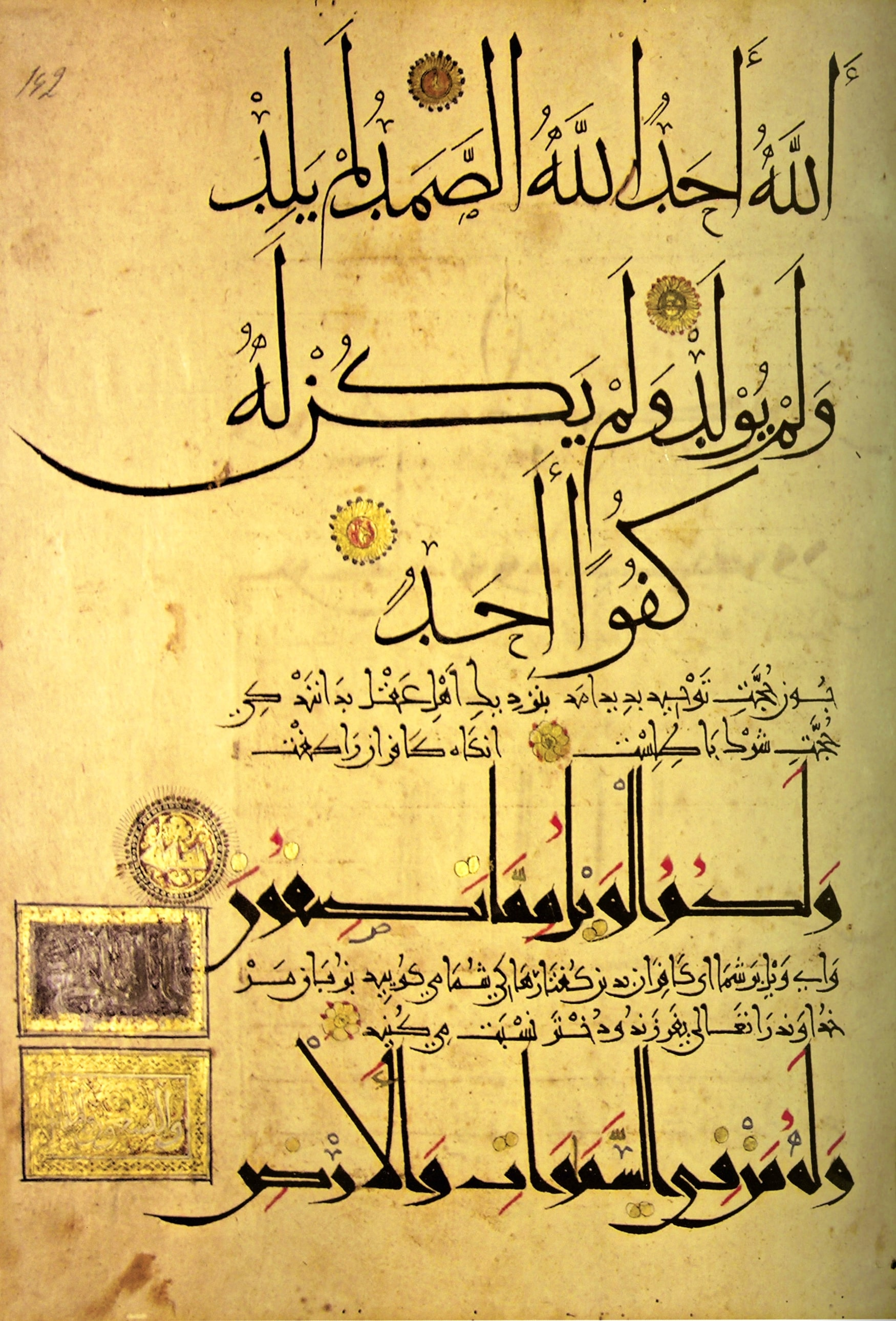
1091 Quranic text in bold script with Persian translation and commentary in a lighter script

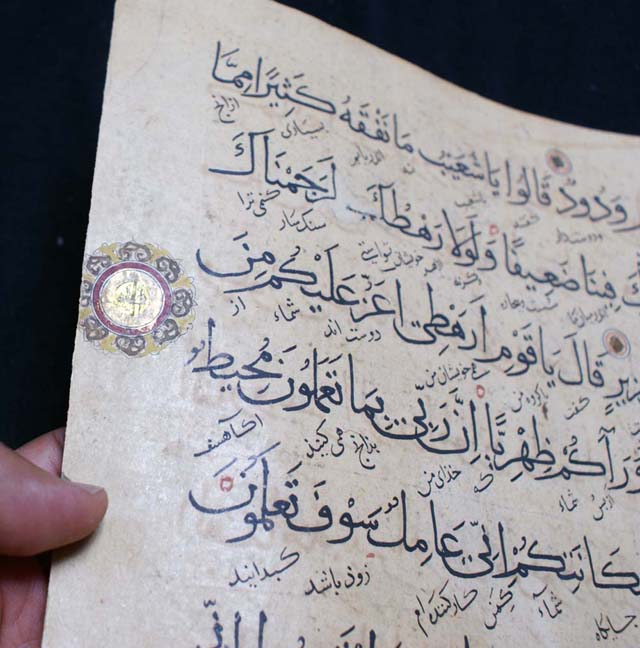
Arabic Quran with interlinear Persian translation from the Ilkhanid Era

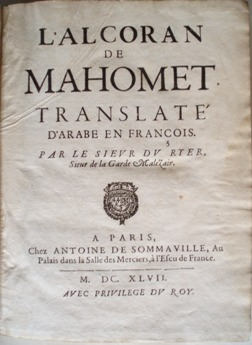
The first printed Quran in a European vernacular language: L'Alcoran de Mahomet, André du Ryer, 1647

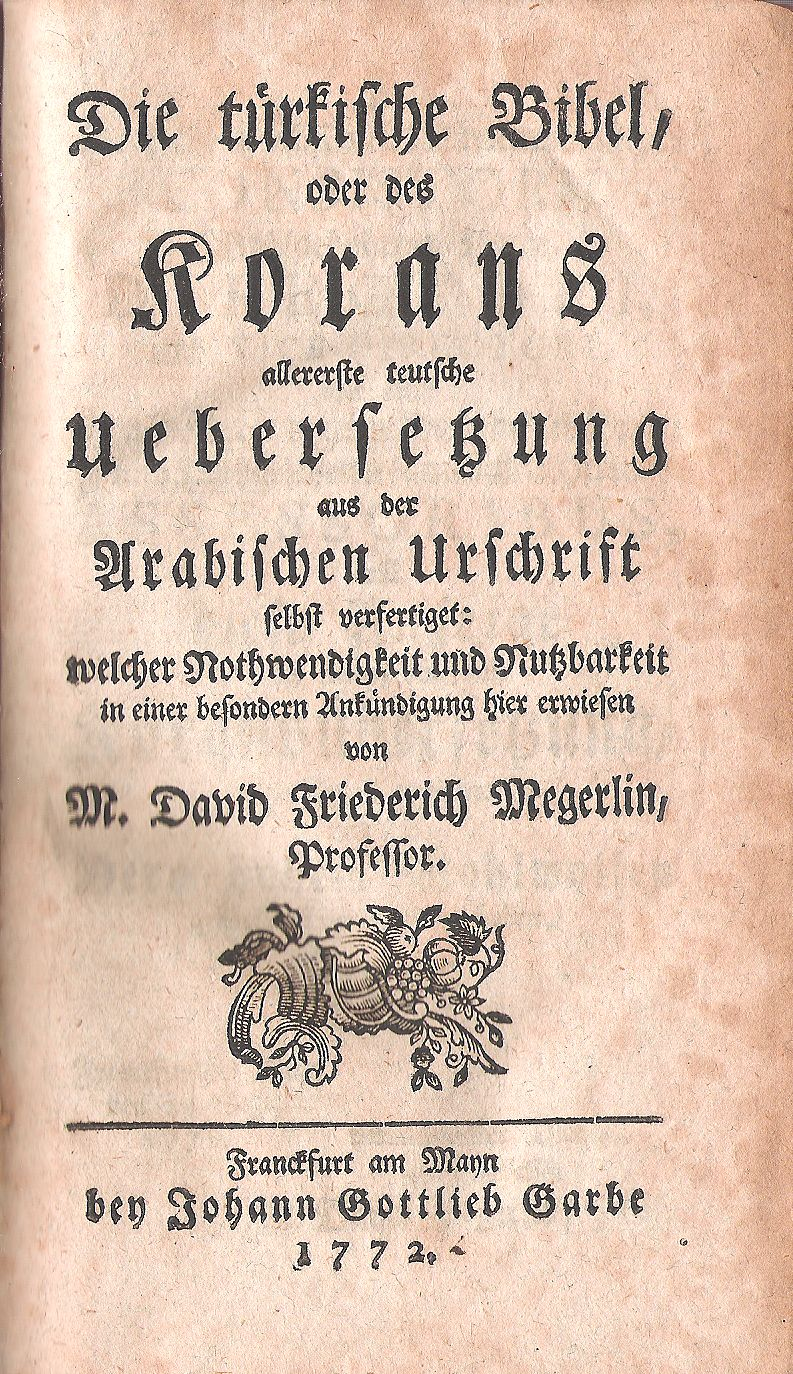
Title page of the first German translation (1772) of the Quran

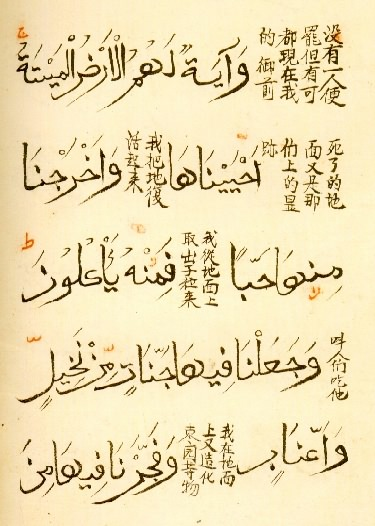
Verses 33 and 34 of surat Yā Sīn in this Chinese translation of the Quran

== See also ==
- List of chapters in the Quran
- List of translations of the Quran
- Quran translations
- Historical reliability of the Quran
- Quran and miracles
- Quran code
- Criticism of the Quran
- Violence in the Quran
- Women in the Quran
- Digital Quran
- The True Furqan
- Qira'at
- Hadith
- Hadith al-Thaqalayn
- Islamic schools and branches
- Schools of Islamic theology
- Attempted imitations of the Quran
- Al-Insan 7–9
