= Revisionist school of Islamic studies =

Scientific historical movement questioning traditional narratives

The revisionist school of Islamic studies (also critical school of Islamic studies and critical historians of Islam) is a scientific movement in Islamic studies that questions traditional Muslim narratives of the origins of the religion of Islam.

In the early 1970s some non-Muslim Islamic scholars (called "revisionists" later) began to question the traditional / conventional accounts of the rise of Islam. This origin story and the reliability of its traditional "literary sources" was subscribed to not only by the Islamic world but in large part by most non-Muslim Islamic scholars. Revisionists had doubts about these traditional sources—which included accounts of what the Islamic prophet Muhammad and his followers said, did, approved of, etc, passed down orally and then written down 150 to 250 years afterwards—that (the new scholars argued) were subject to biases of and embellishments by the authors and transmitters. To these traditional sources revisionists proposed employing a "source-critical" approach, including relevant archaeology, epigraphy, numismatics, and contemporary non-Arabic literature that they argued provided "hard facts" and an ability to crosscheck.

Revisionist scholars include John Wansbrough and his students Andrew Rippin, Norman Calder, G. R. Hawting, Patricia Crone and Michael Cook; as well as Fred Donner, Günter Lüling, Yehuda D. Nevo and Christoph Luxenberg; Tom Holland, and Ibn Warraq; who all drew on the earlier work of Ignác Goldziher and Joseph Schacht.

Their theories are "by no means" monolithic, but they do share some "methodological premises", and theories: namely that the basic principles of what we know of as Islam was formed not just during the ten years of Muhammad's mission (622–632 CE), (Note: for example: many believe scripture says Islam was "completed" just before the death of Muhammad. "... [The] Prophet completed his Final Sermon, and upon it, ... the revelation came down: '…This day have I perfected your religion for you, completed My Grace upon you, and have chosen Islam for you as your religion…' (Quran 5:3)") but over a considerably longer period including the 7th-century Arab invasion of Byzantine and Persian empires, Rashidun caliphs and the Umayyad Caliphs; that the religious, political, cultural break between the civilizations of Persia and Byzantium, and the new 7th-century Arab Muslim empire, was not as abrupt as the traditional history describes; (Note: (an idea advanced in the statement of the Fifth colloquium of the Near Eastern History Group of Oxford University). Colloquium organizers argued that if "we begin by assuming that there must have been some continuity, we need either go beyond the Islamic sources or ... reinterpret them".) that Muhammad did not come from the city of Mecca and the belief that he did is an invented tradition from decades after his death; that the relationship between Muhammad and Jews and Christians may have originally been much less hostile than traditionally described. Issues not agreed on include the historicity of Muhammad and questions about the Quran, such as when it first appeared, how it was written, and how it was transmitted from one generation to another in its early years. (Note: On the question of whether Muhammad was an historical figure, as Muslim believe, and not a mythical figure, some revisionists believe the answer is yes (including Patricia Crone, Michael Cook, Fred Donner, Tom Holland, Günter Lüling); and some no (John Wansbrough, Hans Jansen, Karl-Heinz Ohlig, Yehuda D. Nevo). Even more disagree over the origins of the holy book of Islam, the Quran, on issues such as (in the words of Fred Donner): "When did it first appear? How was it first written? In what kind of language was—is—it written? What form did it first take? Who constituted its first audience? How was it transmitted from one generation to another, especially in its early years? When, how and by whom was it codified?")

== Origins and methodology ==
=== Study of Islam in the West ===
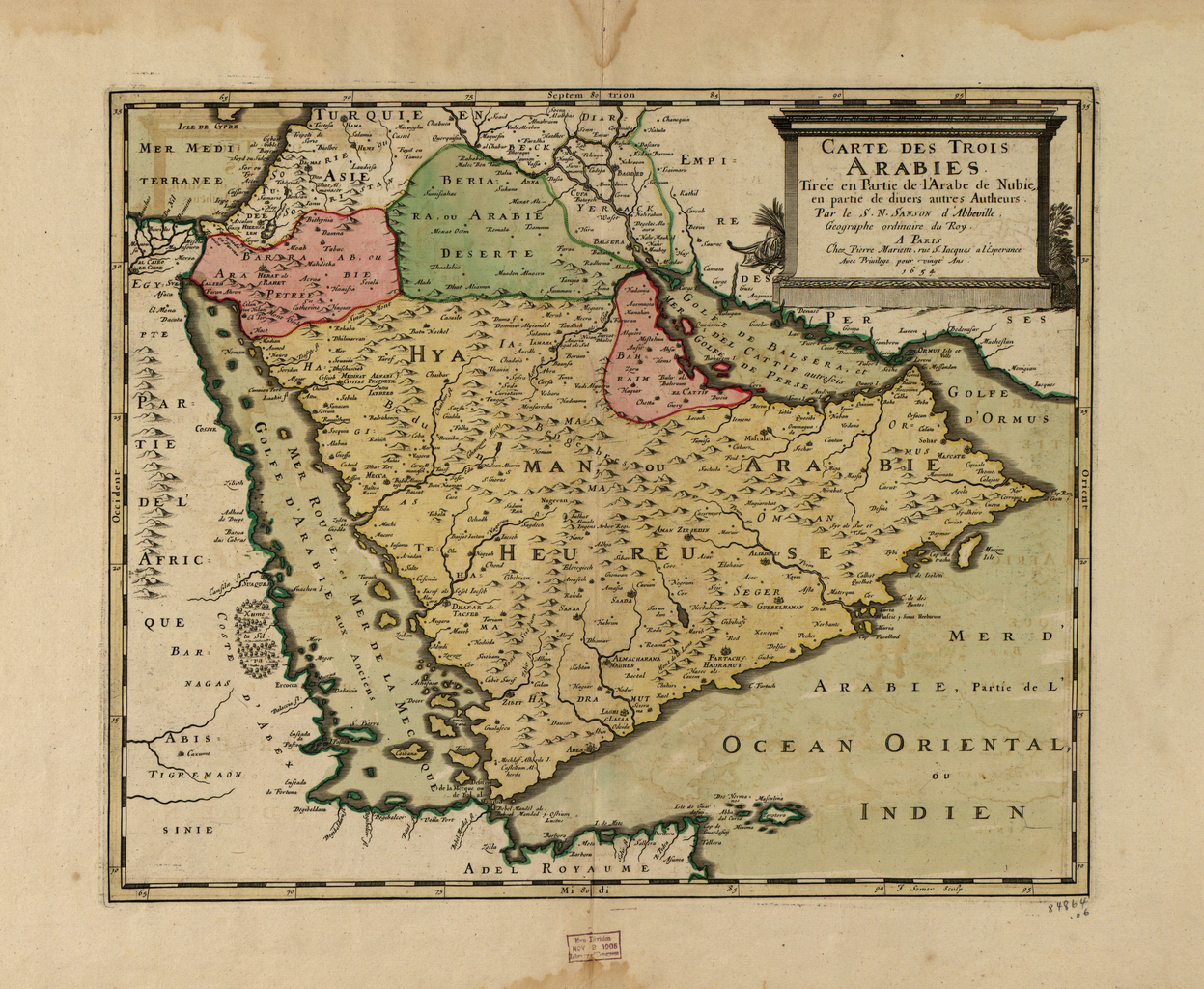
Non-Islamic testimonies about Muhammad's life describe him as the leader of the Saracens, believed to be descendants of Ishmael, lived in the northern regions; Arabia Petrae and Arabia Deserta.

The influence of the different tendencies in the study of Islam in the West has waxed and waned. Ibn Warraq believes "the rise of this revisionist school" may be dated from the Fifth Colloquium of the Near Eastern History Group of Oxford University in July 1975. Robert Hoyland believes that revisionists were ascendant in the 1970s and 1980s.

Prior to that time, scholar Charles Adams describes two different approaches to the study of Islam in the West, each favored in different eras: "Western Orientalism" prevailed before World War II, and may have been guilty of "the sins of unsympathetic, hostile, or interested approaches" in its study of the religion; it was followed by a movement represented in both religious and academic circles, that stretched from the end of the War to sometime around the mid-1970s, and endeavored to show "a new attitude" and "greater appreciation" towards Islam. Herbert Berg gives Wilfred Cantwell Smith and W. Montgomery Watt as examples of proponents of this post-war "irenic" approach to Islamic history, and notes that the approach necessarily clashed with scholarship that questioned Islamic doctrine (as the revisionists did).

=== Sources for the different accounts of the origins of Islam ===
During the "irenic" era of the 1950s to early 1970s, non-Muslim Islamic scholars, accepted the Islamic origin story "in most of its details", (though not the accounts of supernatural activity, such as how angels descended to fight a battle on behalf of Muhammad), and the reliability of the story's basis — the Muslim "literary sources" used in traditional religious historical scholarship. These sources include hadith, records of the words, actions, and the silent approval of accounts of Muhammad — which like the Quran qualify as revelation from God according to the traditional Islamic history). (Note: “The full systems of Islamic theology and law are not derived primarily from the Quran. Muhammad’s sunna was a second but far more detailed living scripture, and later Muslim scholars would thus often refer to the Prophet as `The Possessor of Two Revelations`”) Also foundational (though not divinely revealed) are early tafsir (commentaries on the Quran), sīrah (biography of the prophet), khabar (reports or stories about historical events from early Islam, also a “narrative of biographical character”), qissa ("edifying narratives of the prophets" often spiced with colorful stories "intended to keep the attention of the audience"), mathal (narratives or a sayings intended to prove an element of doctrine or "explain a circumstance of life"), and maghazi (narratives of Muhammad's military campaigns).

=== Studies of hadith ===
The first literary source to be questioned by secular scholars was hadith—not in the early 1970s but the early and mid-20th century, and not by revisionists but by their forerunners, Islamic scholars Ignác Goldziher (1850–1921) and Joseph Schacht (1902–1969). Goldziher and Schacht argued that the traditional Islamic accounts about Islam's early times, written generations after Muhammad died, cannot be relied on as historical sources. Goldziher argued, in the words of R.S. Humphreys,

"that a vast number of hadith accepted even in the most rigorously critical Muslim collections were outright forgeries from the late 8th and 9th centuries—and as a consequence, that the meticulous isnads [the chain or list of people who supposedly passed on the tradition] which supported them were utterly fictitious."

Schacht argued Islamic law was not passed down without deviation from Muhammad but "developed ... out of popular and administrative practice under the Umayyads, and this practice often diverged from the intentions and even the explicit wording of the Koran... norms derived from the Koran were introduced into Muhammadan law almost invariably at a secondary stage."

=== Extension of arguments ===
The revisionists argued that what applied to hadith also applied to the other literary sources mentioned above: Muhammad's biography; the history of the Quran's formation; and the historical developments under the first Islamic dynasty. Revisionists believe that these traditional Islamic accounts, not just hadith, also written down generations after Muhammad died, were embellished by their authors and transmitters whose biases they were subject to, and that determining the actual historical events of the earliest times of Islam requires new research and an application of the aforementioned historical-critical method, (Note: In a 1999 article, Toby Lester describes the clash between critical-historical study of the Koran and traditional Islam.) (the process of evaluating the validity, reliability, relevance, etc., of a source, to the subject under investigation). According to Nevo and Koren, that requires using the

- source-critical approach, (a variety of historical criticism that searches for the original sources which lie behind a given text), "to both the Koran and the Muslim literary accounts of the rise of Islam, the Conquest and the Umayyad period"; and
- comparing traditional accounts with
  - non-Muslim accounts from the seventh and eighth century CE;
  - archaeology, epigraphy, numismatics from the seventh and eighth century CE—sources which should be preferred when there is a conflict with Muslim literary sources.

In the words of Cook and Crone, historians must "step outside the Islamic tradition altogether and start again."

== Main Revisionist theses ==
=== Questioning historical sources ===
Some of the reasons revisionists consider the Quran, hadith and other religious sources unreliable, are:

==== Purposes ====
Their purpose is to strengthen religious faith, not to investigate and find out what actually happened. Traditions of early Islamic military campaigns, for example, do not describe things like planning, tactics and weaponry, troop strength, layout, or movement, but rather tell stories of "past glories and heroic exploits" to encourage the troops. The literature sometimes include supernatural elements, such as sīrah author Ibn Ishaq telling of hosts of angels coming to the aid of Muhammad at the Battle of Badr.

==== Lateness of dates ====
In the words of revisionist G.R. Hawting,

We have no biography of Muhammad, no commentary on the Quran, no law book, no collection of Hadiths, no history of early Islam, etc. which can be said to predate, in the form in which we have it, (Note: "it is true that there are a few traditional texts conventionally attributed to figures who died before 800 C.E. (notably Ibn Ishaq and Malik b. Anas)" but "we only have those works in recensions made by Muslim scholars of later generations, and none of the works available to us were put into the form in which we know them earlier than the ninth century C.E. (the third century of Islam).) the beginning of the third Islamic century.

Oral and written transmission over generations subjects literature to distortion both intentional and unintentional. Most Islamic literature was said to be passed down orally for generations before being committed to writing. Oral history may distort the original account unintentionally (as in the children's game "Chinese whispers"), or intentionally tell readers what they thought happened or wanted to believe happened, instead of what the transmitter actually heard or saw, (for example, substituting "Muhammad" for "The Prophet"—since the copyist "knows" The Prophet is Muhammad),

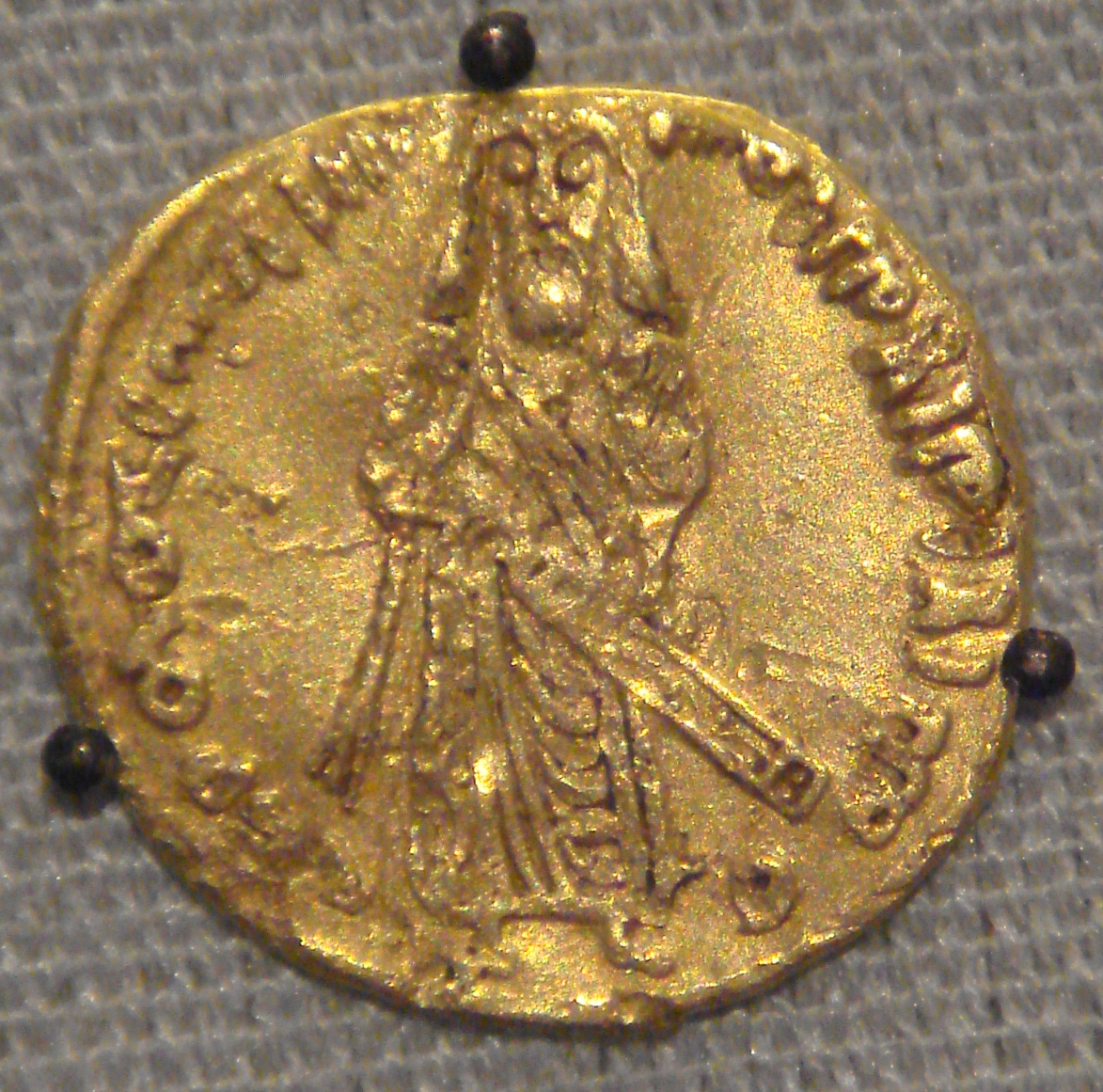
Gold dinar minted by the Umayyads in 695, which likely depicts Abd al-Malik. (Note: The general view among historians and numismatists is that the human figure depicted in the coins minted by Abd al-Malik between 693 and 697, which have come to be known as the "standing caliph" issue, represent Abd al-Malik.) The historian Robert Hoyland, however, argues that this may be a near-contemporary depiction of the prophet Muhammad.

==== Contradictions, confusions, inconsistencies ====
Accounts in the traditional literature of what went on in the time of early Muslims (and shortly before and after) contain "contradictions, confusions, inconsistencies", (some examples being: Meccans first traded with foreigners who came to Mecca but stopped in the pre-Islam past; contradicted by another story of Arabs stopping trade after Islam triumphed to have more time to pray. The Meccans went to Syria every summer and winter; contradicted by Meccans going to Syria in one season and to Yemen the next).

===== Expansion of historical accounts over time =====
Examining sīrah, revisionist scholar Patricia Crone found a pattern, where the farther a commentary was removed in time from the life of Muhammad and the events in the Quran, the more information the commentaries provided, despite the fact that the putative sources for their contents were the earlier sources. Crone attributed this phenomenon to storytellers' embellishment.

If one storyteller should happen to mention a raid, the next storyteller would know the date of this raid, while the third would know everything that an audience might wish to hear about.

An example was the oldest prophetic biography—that of Ibn Ishaq (died 767)—which was much smaller than the commentary of Al-Waqidi (d.823), despite the fact that Waqidi's later works covered a shorter period of time (only Muhammad's period in Medina).

Waqidi will always give precise dates, locations, names, where Ibn Ishaq has none, accounts of what triggered the expedition, miscellaneous information to lend color to the event

Orthodox Muslims, including compilers of the accounts (in particular hadith), agree the original sources contained many falsified historical accounts, but maintain that the traditional religious scholarly discipline, "science of hadith", has determined their accuracy. Revisionists dispute this. One concern is that rather than decreasing in number over time as they were lost or forgotten, the number of hadith increased, a red flag that fabrications must have been added. Patricia Crone argues that it's not possible to find a "core" of authentic hadith because we do not know when their fabrication started.

Bukhari [810–870 CE] is said to have examined a total of 600,000 traditions attributed to the Prophet; he preserved some 7000 (including repetitions), or in other words dismissed some 593,000 as inauthentic. If Ibn Hanbal [780–855 CE] examined a similar number of traditions, he must have rejected about 570,000, his collection containing some 30,000 (again including repetitions). Of Ibn Hanbal's traditions, 1,710 (including repetitions) are transmitted by the companion Abd Allah ibn Abbas [619–687 CE]. Yet less than fifty years earlier one scholar had estimated that Ibn Abbas had only heard nine traditions from the Prophet, while another thought that the correct figure might be ten. If Ibn Abbas had heard ten traditions from the Prophet in the years around 800, but over a thousand by about 850 CE, how many had he heard in 700 or 632? Even if we accept that ten of Ibn Abbas' traditions are authentic, how do we identify them in the pool of 1,710?

==== Suspicious similarities in content ====
In their study of the traditional Islamic accounts of early conquest (known as khabar rather than hadith), historians Albrecht Noth and Lawrence Conrad found the conquests of several key cities—Damascus and Caesarea in Syria, Babilyn/al-Fusat and Alexandria in Egypt, Tustar in Khuzistan and Cordoba in Spain—are described as having been conquered by Muslims in the same way. There is a

"traitor who, ... points out a weak spot in the city's fortification to the Muslim besiegers; a celebration in the city which diverts the attention of the besieged; then a few assault troops who scale the walls, ... a shout of 'Allahu akbar!' ... from the assault troops as a sign that they have entered the town; the opening of one of the gates from inside, and the onslaught of the entire army."

Revisionists found this unlikely, and in one instance of where an Islamic account could be compared with that of a non-Muslim one (the conquest of the island of Arwad, 3 km off the Syrian coast, in 29 A.H/650 CE, chronicled by Theophilus of Edessa), the two differed to an "extraordinary extent" and were "irreconcilable".

==== Questions about Quranic text ====
- The Quranic text in use today shows many differences to the earliest existing manuscripts. A core part of the Quran may derive from Muhammad's annunciations, yet some parts of the Quran were definitively added later or were reworked later. In addition, many small deviations came into the text, as with other ancient texts that were manually copied and copied again. (See: Ahruf)
- The existence and significance of Muhammad as a historical person depends especially on the question of whether any or, if so, how many, parts of the Quran can be attributed to his time or whether all or most parts of the Quran came into being only after Muhammad's time. The researchers' opinions differ over that question. Fred Donner suggests an early date for the Quran. (That thesis has been abandoned by many revisionists in the 21st century because of studies and dating of early manuscripts. In 2017, Tom Holland stated that "the evidence seems to suggest" that the contemporary standard Quran "was uttered by Muhammad in the period that Muslim tradition has insisted that he lived".)
- The Quran is not written in a "pure" Arabic, as the Syriac language seems to have had a certain influence on the language of the Quran that was forgotten later. That could provide a possible explanation of why something like one fifth of the Quranic text is difficult to understand, (according to Gerd R. Puin. (Note: "... if you look at [the Quran], you will notice that every fifth sentence or so simply doesn't make sense.") (See: The Syro-Aramaic Reading of the Koran)

==== Questions about Muhammad ====
A group of researchers (Nevo, Koren, and others) rejected the historical existence of Muhammad and stated that his biography dealt not with an historical figure, but with a legendary one (Note: In Nevo & Koren (2003): Crossroads to Islam: The Origins of the Arab Religion and the Arab State) (comparable to the debates about the historicity of Jesus or of Moses). According to Volker Popp, "Ali" and "Muhammad" were not names, but titles of these figures. (Note: The titles given to Jesus by Assyrian Christians living in the Sasanian Empire are equivalent to Muhammad's New Testament benedictus, ευλογημένος. In a numismatic study, Popp identified coins dating to 16 AH inscribed with mhmd (Arabic written without vowels, but lacking the rasulullah, which became common later). Popp added Arab-Sasanian and Syrian coins inscribed with MHMT in the Pahlavi script, and also partly with mhmd in the Arabic script, combined with Christian symbolism in some cases.)

=== Questions about how the Arabs brought the new religion of Islam ===
==== Traditional account ====
The standard version of the origin of Islam–based on hadith, tafsir, sīrah, etc. criticized above and described by historians such as G. R. Hawting, Tamim Ansary, Robert G. Hoyland, Suliman Bashear, Ibn Warraq—has God revealing the holy book, (the Quran), to his messenger Muhammad, an illiterate trader based in the wealthy pagan trading city of Mecca in western Arabia. Muhammad preaches and spreads this new religion, purified of idolatry and polytheism, superseding Judaism and Christianity, with law based on his sayings and practices in everyday life. After his death his disciples ("companions"), outnumbered but full of zeal and with God on their side, continue Islam's expansion, conquering a vast area in record time, They offer to the conquered inhabitants the options of conversion to Islam, surrender with a payment of a poll tax on non-Muslims, or "death in battle". Not only do they replace the law and ruling religious doctrine of the diverse defeated people with sharia and Arabian Islam, but the language and culture—and not over many generations, but by the end of the seventh century. Thus it is to the first half century of Islam (613-661 CE) when the Quran was revealed and Islam was "perfected", that Muslims should look to to find correct doctrine and models to emulate.

===== Implications of "hard sources" =====
Revisionists (R. Hoyland, Yehuda D. Nevo, J. Koren) point out that elements of this account should be reflected in the physical remains of archaeology, papyri, rock inscriptions and coins, dating from the first century or so after Muhammad's death (i.e. 630-730 CE). For example, Byzantine, (Note: (in languages such as Armenian, Greek, or Syriac)) Jewish or Persian literature (such as chronicles), from 7th century, (Note: at least for the first 60 years, documents produced "from within the community of the prophet Muhammad" are scarce and primarily "army requisition notes, tax demands, prayers and coin legends", and so less than helpful for historical purposes; "original documents—diaries, letters, tax registers, decrees, inscriptions, and so on—together with monuments, artworks, coins and the like. Regrettably, very little of that kind has come down to us …. (Humphreys, Mu’awiya, 10. quoted in Little, Joshua (21 October 2022). "The New Historiography of Islamic Origins: A Review of Some Recent Trends in the Field". Islamic Origins.); "The most substantial corpus" of material from the seventh-century that have survived for historians are the numerous papyri, starting in 21/642 CE, concerning the local Arab administration in Egypt and the feeding, housing, equipping of the new Arab armies.) ought to provide some indication of:

- when and where Arabs conquered (Syria and Palestine in 641 CE, Mesopotamia in 636 CE, Egypt between 639 and 646 CE, and the rest of the Persian/Sassanid empire by 651);
- the reign of the Rashidun ("Rightly Guided") Caliphs (632–661 CE) and how they brought a new religion, new laws, new ways of doing things, ruling with justice and piety.

Archaeological digs should find things like

- remains of major battles, ruins of overrun forts, destroyed symbols of Byzantine authority, etc., dating to the times given by the traditional account;
- coins with verses or parts of verses from the Quran and mention of Muhammad and the caliphate dating from after the conquest, (coins being both common archaeological artifacts and "official pronouncements" of the state that minted them; the inclusion of these features being standard on coins of later Islamic states).

The thousands of rock inscriptions in the Arabian Peninsula and Syro-Jordanian desert made during different eras, that (as far as they can be deciphered) should indicate a pagan era before 630 CE and an Islamic era after, with some overlap (e.g. Islamic inscriptions and mentions of paganism or pagan names).

==== Conflict between traditional account and "hard sources" ====
But in fact, revisionists argue, there are numerous contradictions between physical remains and the traditional/conventional historical account, including:

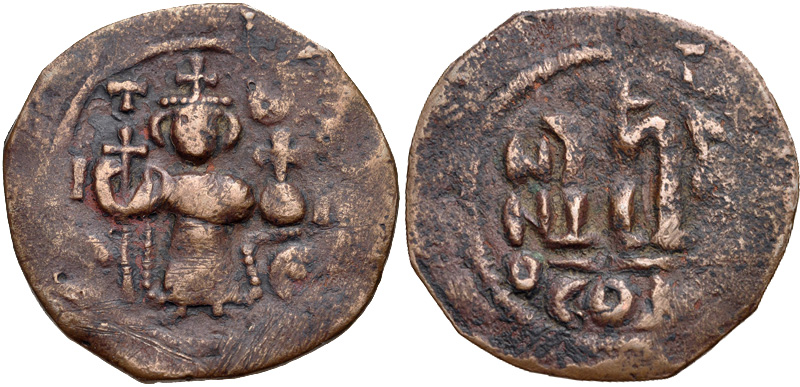
A "Pseudo-Byzantine" coin with depictions of the Byzantine Emperor Constans II holding the cross-tipped staff and globus cruciger. There was no specific Islamic-religious identity and political stance with sharp boundaries in the early Islamic period.

Lack of sharp division you'd expect between the victorious conquering invaders and the defeated Christians and Persians:

- A failure for "at least" a decade, of chroniclers among the Christian inhabitants to recognized Arabs as rulers/conquerors -- rather than just "immigrants" (mhaggraye, magaritai, muhājir ) or raiders (S.P. Brock).
- No attempt by the conquered people to rebel against the Arab immigrants/conquerors despite outnumbering them by a wide margin (for example the Arabs took over Jerusalem by negotiations rather than by siege) (Tom Holland).
- In archeological digging, a lack of abrupt changes—in destruction, style of pottery, etc.—usually found in Palestine when uncovering a conquest of a civilization (F. Donner, R. Hoyland). (Note: Unlike most conquests in Palestine, the Arab conquest left no layer of destruction for archeologists to find, the kind and/or style of pottery doesn’t change, so its difficult to distinguishing archaeologically examining the layers of sediment, debris, rock, and other materials that form or accumulate to create Stratigraphy. (Fred Donner), Hoyland also states that "the Arab conquests were not particularly destructive".))

===== Questions about Muhammad and his companions =====
Lack of specific Islamic characteristics in epigraphs, coins, documents of the Arab invaders until around 700 CE i.e. the mention of Muhammad and his prophethood, the "rightly guided" caliphs who succeed him, the new religion of Islam, its holy book the Quran, laws based on the divine revelation of Muhammad's sayings and doings. In general, a "striking" scarcity of evidence, aside from later Muslim literature, for the idea that the Arabs were Muslim at all at the time of the Arab conquest (Y. Nevo and J. Koren);

- When the new Arab invaders/immigrants are recognized as rulers by Christian chroniclers/observers they're described "mostly" in ethnic rather than religious terms (R. Hoyland), (S.P. Brock); (Note: It would be "generally true" to say that "the Syriac sources of this period see the conquests primarily as Arab, and not Muslim" (S.P. Brock);) the chroniclers observe that "among them (Arabs) there are many Christians..." (Abdul-Massih Saadi), (Fred Donner); (Note: Christians were soldiers in the Arab immigration/invasion (Fred Donner);) that Muhammad was commonly referred to as simply the first of the Arab "kings", rather than by the standard Islamic title of "prophet" or "apostle" (S.P. Brock).
- The fact that when the Christians did talk of the religion of the immigrants/conquerors they did not mention the "Quran", "Islam", or that (at least some of) the immigrants/conquerors were of a new religion (Abdul-Massih Saadi). (Note: Saadi did not examine the sources of Arab Mhaggraye because none have been found.)
- The religion of the Arabs they do mention was monotheism "in accordance" with the Torah", (sharing much of the content of the Christian Old Testament), as expressed at a post-conquest religious colloquium. (Note: (This was described in connection with a religious colloquium between the immigrant/invaders and the locals, where the Arab emir is accompanied by "learned Jews", though none of the sources describe the immigrants as Jews.)
- A lack of Islamic iconography on coins (God in the Arabic form, "Allah", is found, but not "Muhammad is the Messenger of God") until the reign of Abd al-Malik ibn Marwan (646-705 CE), (Note: coins of the region and era (Arab-Sassanian coins) finds a period between the Arab conquest and around 70 AH (689/690 CE, during the reign of Abd al-Malik ibn Marwan 646-705 CE), when coins used monotheist phrases such as bism Allah, bism Allah rabbi/al-malik, rabbi Allah, but no specifically Islamic phrases, such as the name of Muhammad (Y. Nevo, J. Koren). Another indication of Arabs practicing monotheism influenced by Judaism before Islam comes from Sozomen, a Greek from Gaza, writing a couple centuries before Muhammad, who describes Arabs who believed "that Abraham had bequeathed a monotheist religion" to Arabs, "including descent from Ishmael and Hagar and prohibition of pork and other Jewish practices", (though there is no proof this belief was found throughout the Arabian peninsula).) and no use of the name of Muhammad on Arab-Sassanian coins until sometime after 685 CE, despite traditional sources claiming Syria and Palestine were conquered by Arabs in 641 CE (Y. Nevo, J. Koren). (Note: in the words of archaeologist Yehuda Nevo and researcher Judith Koren -- "legends on coins are official pronouncements of current state attitudes (in this case to religion), intended for wide promulgation. Merely placing religious formulae on coins involves a conscious act of choice regarding what to say and what to omit.") (Other "documentary evidence" from the era before 685 CE—such as papyuri—also make no mention of the messenger of God (Rasul Allah) "at all".) (Note: Crone and Hinds note how "striking" it is that the documentary evidence that "survives from the Sufyanid period (661-684) makes no mention of the messenger of God [Rasul Allah] at all. The papyuri do not refer to him. The Arabic inscriptions of the Arab-Sassanian coins only invoke Allah, not his rasul" (messenger))
- No appearance of the words “Muhammad", "Muslims” and “Islam” and references to distinctly Islamic rituals and the Prophet are found before 690 CE among the many medieval stone inscriptions in Arabic in western Arabia, (Ilkka Lindstedt, (Note: 'According to the epigraphic [stone inscriptions] corpus, distinctly Islamic identity began to be articulated in the first decades of the eighth century CE, with an emphasis on specific rituals and the Prophet, as well as with the appearance of the words “Muslims” and “Islam” as references to the religious group.') Y. Nevo, J. Koren).
- A legal system based not on what is now known as shariah (Islamic law), but on the "mixed custom-administrative law" of the outer provinces of the Roman empire, prior to the changes made by Abbasid era legal scholar Al-Shafi‘i who died almost 200 years after Muhammad (820 CE). In this "pre-Islamic sunnah" of Arabia, and later the "living traditions" of the newly formed Islamic schools (J. Schacht), caliphs were "free to make and unmake Sunnah as they wished"; early Muslim scholars observed that citing hadith of the prophet as the basis of law was an innovation from past practices.
- No mention in the early sources found by historians of any offers by Arab warriors to Persians and Byzantines to avoid conquest by converting to Islam (R. Hoyland); (as one of three choices of "conversion, surrender with a payment of a poll tax, or death in battle"). Tribute paid to the Arabs was the cost of being conquered, not of being non-Muslims (Robert Hoyland), and once paid, a subject was allowed to remain "whatever faith he wished". (Note: A Christian source, John of Fenek, writes not of proselytizing by the conquerors, but that "of each person" the Arabs "required only tribute, allowing him to remain in whatever faith he wished.") Some who did avoid paying tribute did so by serving as guides and spies (Samaritans), frontier guards (Jarajima of the Black Mountain region), or allied military forces (Persians of Darband), (R. Hoyland).

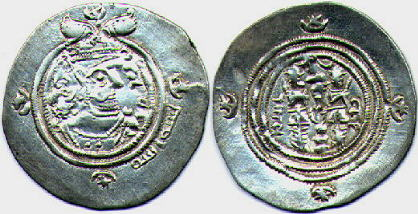
Numismatic evidences; Sasanid-style coins of early Islamic period (Pahlavi scripts, crescent-star, fire altar, depictions of Khosrow II, bismillāh in margin). Unlike known historical figures such as Ibn Zubayr and Mu'awiya I, there are no coins minted in the names of caliphs titled Rashidun that could be evidence of official dominancy.

- No mention of the Rashidun (or "rightly guided" caliphs) by the conquered Christians, nor by Arabs in coins, inscriptions, or documents, (R. Hoyland); (Note: Robert Hoyland states that "writers who lived at the same time as the first four caliphs ... recorded next to nothing about them, and their names do not appear on coins, inscriptions, or documents. It is only with the fifth caliph ... Mu'awiya (661-680), that was have evidence of a functioning Arab government, since his name appears on all official state media.") Traditionally the Rashidun were thought of as the model rulers (along with Muhammad of course) that others should emulate.
- No mention of the legendary futūḥ battles (i.e. the early Arab-Muslim conquests which facilitated the spread of Islam and Islamic civilization) (Y. Nevo, J. Koren).

===== Doubts about Mecca =====
Lack of evidence from hard sources that the city of Mecca was either connected in some way to Muhammad or a place of significance in Muhammad's time.

- The ignorance of the putatively major trading center and oasis in Hijaz of Mecca by ancient Roman and Greek diplomats, geographers, historians, traders, mercenary recruiters, and even by the conquered peoples (at least "for a long time") (P. Crone). Before the Arab conquests, "not a single" source outside Arabia mentioned a city called Mecca.
- No archaeological evidence (as of 1990, despite "extensive" work), "of local Arab cultures" in the region Muhammad is traditionally thought to have lived in (Hijaz) during the time he is thought to have lived there (sixth and early seventh centuries), nor any trace of Jewish settlements in Medina. Remains have been found, but of other cultures -- Hellenistic, Nabatean, Roman, and early Byzantine (Nevo and Koren). (Note: Nevo and Koren state that "extensive ... large scale, systematic surveys and excavations" archaeological work for several decades up to 1990 in Hijaz (Nevo & Koren state that "This work is published continuously in Annual of the Department of Antiquities of Jordan, Abhat, and Atlal. For an impressive example of such field work, see M. Khan and A. Mughannam "Ancient Dams in the Ta'if Area 1981 (1401)," Atlal 6.) has found, contrary to Islamic tradition, "no signs of local Arab cultures from the sixth and early seventh centuries" including no pagan cites or sanctuaries", and no trace of Jewish settlement at Medina, Khaybar or Wadi al-Qurrar. This is despite finding the remains of many other cultures (Hellenistic, Nabatean, Roman, and Early Byzantine), and a "wealth" of pagan shrines and stone stelae in an area to the north -- the central Negev desert (between Arabia and Palestine) -- indicating (also contrary to Islamic tradition), that "active pagans must have formed a considerable part of the Negev population right through the first one-and-a-half centuries of the Muslim era". "Shrines and stone stale testify to a continuous cult of stela worship [in the Negev] from the Nabataean period" down to the mid-eighth century (start of the Abbasid era). Until 160-170 A.H. there were "over thirty" pagan sites that were periodically visited and had pagan ceremonies performed in them". The largest of these, at Sde Boqer, has been partly excavated: for the report see Nevo and Rothenberg, Sde Boqer 1983-84; for the Muslim accounts: Hawting, G.R. "We Were Not Ordered With Entering It" BSOAS 47 (1984) 228-42; Rubin, Uri "The Ka'aba: Aspects of its Ritual, Functions, and Position in Pre-Islamic and Early Islamic Times" JSAI 8 (1986): 97-131; for a comparison of the two: Nevo, Yehuda D. and Koren, Judith (1990) "The Origins of the Muslim Descriptions of the Jahili Meccan Sanctuary" Journal of Near Eastern studies, 49 (1990): 23-44)
- The text of the Quran itself indicates it could not have been revealed in west central Arabia. The Qur'an describes Muhammad's "polytheist opponents as agriculturalists who cultivated wheat, grapes, olives, and date palms", but Mecca was not suitable for any kind of agriculture, and one could not possibly have produced olives there", (Crone). On two occasions the Qur'an describes its enemies as living in the nearby a settlement destroyed for its sins by God, not something hijaz was known for (Crone).
- Early lack of connection between Muhammad and Mecca is also indicated in the fact that the house of the Prophet's putative birthplace in Mecca was made a house of prayer only by al-Khayzuran (d.173 AH), during Umayyad time, prior to which it was used as an ordinary dwelling house.

==== Doubts about Sharia ====
- Robert G. Hoyland also argues that if the basis for sharia was the doings and sayings of Muhammad, as mainstream Islam maintains, they must have been carefully noted and carefully transmitted to later ulama by the early salaf generation of Muslims. However, that doctrine is belied by quotes of the Islamic scholars of this generation who specifically deny common use of hadith of Muhammad:
  - "I spent a year sitting with Abdullah ibn Umar [d. 693 CE, son of the second Caliph] and I did not hear him transmit anything from the prophet";
  - "I never heard Jabir ibn Zayd (d. c. 720) say 'the prophet said ...' and yet the young men round here are saying it twenty times an hour".
- Patricia Crone argues that Sharia (Islamic law) was founded not on traditions of Muhammad, rasul allah, the messenger of God, but on the law "of the Near East as it had developed under Alexander. The Muslims sifted and systematized this law in the name of God, imprinting it with their own image in the process." This provincial law that "the Umayyad caliphate in general and Muawiya in particular" employed, became what we now call sharia after a "long period of adjustments by the ulama."

===== Confusion over dates =====
Traditional sources tell that the starting date of the Islamic calendar commemorates the Hijrah—the migration of Muhammad and his followers from Mecca to Medina to found the first Muslim community on 16 July 622. But no seventh century source confirms that the Hijrah, or any other event, was chosen to be year zero of the calendar. The "only clue to its nature" found by at least two scholars (P. Crone and M. Cook) comes from two Nestorian Christian documents of 676 and 680 that call the calendar's starting date the year of 'the rule of the Arabs'".

Early sources also don't agree on the dates of the Prophet's birthday and death. "[W]ell into the second century A.H. scholarly opinion of the birth date of the Prophet displayed a range of variance of 85 years", (Lawrence Conrad).

===== Lack of hostility to Jews =====
Traditional accounts tell of Jewish tribes being punished for their treachery—being driven into exile (the Banu Qaynuqa and Banu Nadir tribes) or massacred and "dumped into pits" (the Banu Qurayza tribe). Hadith tell that during the beginning of Muhammad's mission in Mecca, Muslims had prayed in the same direction the Jews did, towards Jerusalem, but that not long after the Muslims migrated to Medina, the direction (qibla) was changed to Mecca. However, no early documents say anything about these events.

Instead, "The Treaty of Medina" shows, (Note: widely considered authentic according to R. Stephen Humphreys and others. Humphreys, R. Stephen (1991). Islamic History: A Framework for Inquiry – Revised Edition. Princeton University Press. p. 92. ISBN 978-0-691-00856-1. Including revisionist Patricia Crone who is quoted as saying that 'in Ibn Ishaq's sīrah, "it sticks out like a piece of solid rock in an accumulation of rubble."') the Jews were initially part of the Umma (religious community) and were addressed as "believers" (Fred Donner). When the Arabs first conquered Jerusalem they lifted the Christian established ban on Jews being allowed into the city (T. Holland), and allowed them to pray on the temple mount.

=== Explanations offered by revisionists ===
Alternatives to the traditional Islamic history offered by revisionists to explain the "hard facts" of archaeology, epigraphy, numismatics, etc., start with explanations for invasion's success.

==== Explanations for the invasion and its success ====
Both the conquered Byzantines and Arab conquerors blamed the success of the invaders on "God's decree". For Christians, this was God's punishment for their sins, for Arabs "His reward for following the true faith" (R. Hoyland). But secular historians (traditional and revisionist) credit the weakening of the two empires by a devastating financial and manpower drain from

A) the Byzantine–Sasanian War of 602–628 which exhausted both empires, and
B) the bouts of plague in the region starting in around the mid 6th century CE, which may have caused the deaths of up to a quarter of the human population of the Eastern Mediterranean.

Rather than overcoming superior forces in their takeover of Syria and Persia to the north, the Arabs moved into ravaged empires—where in the case of the Byzantium, the emperor Heraclius "could raise no more troops to oppose the Ishmaelites [i.e. Arabs]", according to a local Christian bishop. "Archaeological evidence" indicating Byzantium had begun withdrawing militarily from the Arab border decades before the invasion.

Also explaining their success was evidence that rather than being 'a horde of nomads with no military experience', many Arabs had military experience as mercenaries for both the Byzantium and Persian empires that benefitted them in their invasion of those lands. A century before the death of Muhammad, (Note: i.e. 530 CE, Muhammad's death is traditionally designated as 632 CE) Arab mercenaries leaders were established enough for there to be Romano-Arab and Perso-Arab mini-states with dynasties extending "three, four, or more generations", (R. Hoyland). Arabs served both in regiments in the imperial army and "as independent vassals allied to the empire". Thus they had "acquired valuable training in the weaponry and military tactics of the empires", but were also known to sometimes rebel against their employers. As plague and/or destructive wars weakened the empires and dried up payments to mercenaries, these fighters may have become receptive to declarations from Muhammad and the Quran that booty from attacking their former employers was divinely approved, and to the suggestion that they turn on their former masters.

If Arab attacks on Persia and Byzantium were

- raids motivated by desire for loot, rather than military campaigns seeking conquest in the name of religion; and
- if those raiders found abandoned forts and watch posts of empires ruined by war and disease, and stayed to rule, collect tribute, and intermarry;

this would explain:

- the lack of destruction found by archaeologists, since the invaders background as mercenaries would make them well acquainted with the empires and the advantages of their civilization, less likely to see them as alien and corrupt, and more interested in taking over the empires than demolishing them (Hoyland).
- the lack of recognition for several years by the inhabitants of the Fertile Crescent that the mercenaries-turned-raiders were actually their new rulers (Nevo & Koren);
- the lack of any mention by the conquered of any of the famous futūḥ battles, and the suspiciously formulaic descriptions of these battles in traditional literature, (futūḥ battles being explained by revisionists as more satisfying tales of "How We Beat the Romans" invented in "the late Umayyad and early Abbasid" era—Nevo & Koren);
- reports by conquered Byzantines of Christians among their conquerors; Christians who later converted, or whose descendants later converted, to Islam (Hoyland);

The success of the Arabs rather than other warlike peoples (like the Avars and Turks, to the north and east), can be explained by

- the geographic position of the Arabs. There was little standing between Arabs and the southern soft "underbelly" of the two empires; whereas other peoples were hindered from raiding and pillaging by substantial man-made and natural obstacles (Hoyland).

==== Explanations for lack of early signs of Islamicity ====
The idea that opportunism rather than religious passion led to the Arabs' successful conquest would also explain the lack of religious phrases, personalities, basis of law, in early epigraphs, coins, and documents, etc., mentioned above. Revisionists argue that those were not in evidence yet because Islam as we know it did not exist yet, and would not become a distinct religion until after the Arab conquest of Syria and Persia.

Other explanations for why a gradual evolution of Islam makes more sense include:

- the improbability that the Arab conquest could have swallowed up such a large number of ethnicities, languages, religions and cultures within so short a span of time (Suliman Bashear); (Note: Suliman Bashear argues that it is unlikely that the Arab invasion and conquest could have effected "such changes in world affairs within so short a span of time" that the diversity in "languages, ethnicities, cultures, and religions" were "suddenly swallowed up by Arabian Islam in the early seventh century" as Arabic historical sources of the third AH/ninth CE. century described. much more likely is that Arab invasion preceded "Arabian Islam as we know it", and that Islam was fused with the Arab polity sometime after "the beginning of the second/eighth century";)
- the likelihood that an Islamic empire followed the pattern of other conquests of advanced civilizations—China, Roman Western Europe, etc.—where fierce nomad warriors conquerors dominated those they conquered militarily and politically, but adopted many cultural features of the conquered civilizations (G.R. Hawking).
- the likelihood that the powerful and privileged class of the new empire evolved from being based on the status of conquerors to the status as Muslims, converting to Islam "served as a medium whereby non-Arabs could join the conquest elite" (Hoyland).
- the similarities and differences between the religion of Islam and those of Judaism and Christianity—each having a book of revelation and a prophet "as a model for moral conduct"—but with Islam having a different holy book and prophet to provide legitimacy for the rule of the invaders while also giving cohesion to their empire, (Ibn Rawandi, Ibn Warraq).

==== Influence of the conquered on Islam ====
- Hoyland estimates that the invaders-cum-rulers of Byzantium and Persia (though not all Arab or "believers") were outnumbered by their subjects 100 to 1 (about 25-30 million to 250,000-300,000). Hoyland postulates that while for the first fifty years the Arabs lived apart from most of their subjects in garrison towns, even in these locations there were non-Arab prisoners-of-war, slave/servants, who served as tutors, scribes, wives, concubines. As the first generation of conquerors died off, their descendants grew up in Egypt, Syria, Iraq and Iran, far away from their father's homeland, dependent upon and outnumbered by the non-Arab natives. Consequently, "it was not long before blood was mixed, boundaries blurred, and religion and society fast transformed." As the conquered natives converted to Islam, they shaped its culture and ideology more than passively accepting it.
- Another revisionist (Fred Donner) argues that the Christians among the invaders, the lack of violence in the Arab takeover (which reflected a lack of a need to crush/wipe clean the existing social/political/religious system), the lack of rebellion by the non-Arab conquered against the outnumbered conquerors, and archeological evidence of a couple of churches (including St. John in Damascus) having both Christian and Muslim worship characteristics, suggests that the first Arab invaders were leading a “believers movement”, a general “monotheist revival movement” with (ecumenical) multi-faith membership that gradually evolved into Islam. This would explain a lack of violence in the Arab takeover as the Arabs would not feel a need to crush (or wipe clean) the existing social/political/religious system.
- According to Tom Holland, the conquering Arab warriors were overwhelmingly illiterate, and the early Ulama (the class of guardians, transmitters, and interpreters of religious knowledge in Islam) consisted overwhelmingly of conquered peoples (Zoroastrians and Jews), who had a strong scholarly tradition before converting to Islam.
- In proto-Islamic rule, secular and spiritual power were united in the person of the caliph. There were no special religious scholars. In the formation of Islam as we now know it, religious scholars wrested religious power from the caliphs.

==== Location of Muhammad and the Quran ====
As mentioned above, the text of the Quran indicates the divine book was revealed where wheat, grapes, olives, and date palms were cultivated, and where a nearby settlement had once been destroyed for its sins by God; features that do not match Mecca or nearby land. The text of the Quran also indicates that Islam arose in a milieu where Jewish and Christian texts were well known, and where those accused of being "infidels" did not practice pagan polytheism but a form of monotheism that deviated somewhat from the monotheism of those (Muhammad and his followers) waging polemical attacks upon them (Hawting).

But if Muhammad was not from Mecca and Islam did not arise there, where did he and it come from? Wheat, grapes and olives are the three staples of the Mediterranean; date palms are found somewhat further south. Northwest Arabia has more than a few sites allegedly ruined in divine vengeance for their sinfulness (Crone). An example being Quran 37:137-138, which refers to the remains of Lot's people, that "you pass by them in the morning and in the evening". Traditionally Lot's remains are thought to be somewhere near the Dead Sea (southwest Palestine).

This would indicate that Muhammad's movement started not in Mecca, but many days ride (hundreds of km) to the north, at the northern fringe of the Arabian peninsula, close to the Byzantine and Persian Empires. The change of the qibla, the direction of prayer, from Jerusalem to Mecca may be an echo of this earlier movement. Some of the locations suggested are Palestine (Jerusalem); the southern desert fringes of Palestine (Tom Holland); the northern Negev desert (Nevo and Koren), Northwest Arabia, south of Palestine (Crone). (Note: Petra, east of Palestine, (Another suggested location for the Quran and Muhammad in north-western Arabia (based on the Quran and later traditions is somewhere around Petra in Jordan.)) (Note: All these regions are either different descriptions of the same region or close to each other.)

==== Missing Jewish traitors ====
The traditional narrative story of three Jewish tribes of Medina who end up being driven into exile (the Banu Qaynuqa and Banu Nadir tribes), massacred, or enslaved (Banu Qurayza tribe) for their alleged treachery to Muhammad, is missing from mention in old sources and its story clashes with what we know about Arab Jewish relations at that time.

Research by Fred Donner indicates the connection between Muslims and Jews was close in the early times of Islam, when Jews were also called "believers" and were part of the ummah (religious community). An explanation offered by Holland is that the sources talking about the exile and slaughter of Jewish tribes are all suspicious in being written long after the alleged treachery occurred and from the era of "Muslim greatness" when "authors would have had incentive to spin a story of how the Prophet brusquely slapped down "uppity infidels."

The revisionists view the initial "Islamic expansion" as a secular Arab expansion that did not result in oppression of the non-Muslim population.

=== Shaping of the identity of early Islam ===
==== Timing ====
Revisionist estimates of when Islam was fully formed include not until

- about the mid-Umayyad era (Fred Donner);
- the late Umayyad era (Tom Holland). (Note: Holland, for example, finds it unlikely that the Arab conquest was a "watershed" between one society and a "totally different" one.)
- Patricia Crone and other revisionists believe the Umayyad and Abbasid eras following Muhammad were both of major importance for the formation of Islam:
  - The Umayyad Caliphate (661–750 CE), especially under Abd al-Malik ibn Marwan (647–705, r. 685–705), shaped the Islamic narrative, creating an exclusive Arabian Islamic identity. Under the fifth Umayyad caliph, Abd al-Malik ibn Marwan, the Dome of the Rock in Jerusalem was built. There the word "Islam" appears for the first time. Until this moment the Muslims called themselves simply "believers", and the Arab empire minted coins showing Christian symbols. Abd al-Malik also plays a major role in the reworking of the Quranic text.
  - During the Abbasid Caliphate (750–1258) practically all Islamic traditional texts about Islam's beginnings were written. The Abbasids, having overthrown the Umayyads, had great interest in legitimizing their rule. This motivation can be seen in the traditional texts.

==== Shifting the location of early Islam to Mecca ====
Cook and Crone in their work Hagarism argue that as the Arab conquerors shed their proto-Islamic Jewish and Christian allies (likely under the reign of Marwan I, d.685 CE), they also wanted to shed the multi-religious Levantine origins of the proto-Islamic movement. They did so by creating a mythology whereby the homeland of their religion was in Hijaz, far from its actual origin.

Only after the ascension of the Umayyad Caliphate (661–750 CE) was an exclusive Arabian Islamic identity shaped, shifting the origin narrative to the Arabian peninsula.

== Major representatives ==
Among the "foremost" proponents of revisionism are John Wansbrough (1928–2002), Patricia Crone (1945–2015), Michael Cook, Yehuda D. Nevo (1932–1992), and Fred M. Donner. The new movement originated at the School of Oriental and African Studies at the University of London with the publications of two works by Wansbrough: Quranic Studies (1977) and The Sectarian Milieu (1978). Andrew Rippin (1950–2016), Norman Calder, G. R. Hawting, Patricia Crone and Michael Cook were students of Wansbrough. In 1977 Crone and Cook published Hagarism, which postulated, among other things, that Islam was established after, not before, the Arab conquests and that Mecca was not the original Islamic sanctuary. Later, both distanced themselves from the theses of Hagarism as too far-reaching but continued to "challenge both Muslim and Western orthodox views of Islamic history." Martin Hinds (1941–1988), also studied at SOAS and Robert G. Hoyland was a student of Patricia Crone.

In Germany at the Saarland University, Günter Lüling (1928–2014) and Gerd-Rüdiger Puin focused on the historical-critical research of the development of the Quran starting in the 1970s, and in the 2000s, Karl-Heinz Ohlig, Volker Popp, Christoph Luxenberg and Markus Groß argued that Muhammad was a legendary, not historical, figure. Hans Jansen from the Netherlands published a work in 2005/7 arguing in detail why he assumed that known accounts of Muhammad's life were legendary. Yehuda D. Nevo also questioned the historicity of Muhammad. (Note: in his 2003 work Crossroads to Islam: The Origins of the Arab Religion and the Arab State) Sven Kalisch, a convert to Islam, taught Islamic theology before he left the faith in 2008 and questioned the historicity of Mohammad (as well as those of Jesus and Moses). (Note: Kalisch rejected the idea of teaching Islamic theology without taking into consideration the new results of historical-critical research and as of 2008 was teaching the history of ideas in the Near East in Late Antiquity in Münster, Germany.)

James A. Bellamy has done textual criticism of the Quran and his proposed "emendations," or corrections, of the traditional text of the Quran. Fred Donner, in his several books on early Islamic history, argued that it was only during the reign Abd al-Malik ibn Marwan (685–705) that the early ecumenical monotheism of the Arab conquerors began to separate from Christians and Jews.

The popular historian Tom Holland's work In the Shadow of the Sword (2012) popularized the new research results and depicted a possible synthesis of the various revisionist approaches.

== Publications ==
=== Scholarly ===
==== Patricia Crone and Michael Cook, Hagarism: The Making of the Islamic World (1977) ====
In Hagarism: The Making of the Islamic World, Patricia Crone and Michael Cook set aside traditional Islamic history to draw on archaeological evidence and contemporary documents in Arabic, Armenian, Coptic, Greek, Hebrew, Aramaic, Latin and Syriac. They depict a 7th-century Arab conquest of Byzantine and Persian lands that is not yet "Islamic." According to various sources the conquered people (Greek Magaritai, Syriac Mahgre or Mahgraye) call their conquerors "Hagarenes," rather than Muslims. Instead of being inspired to conquest by a new prophet, holy book, and religion, the Arabs are described as being in alliance with the Jews by following a Jewish messianism to reclaim the Promised Land from the Byzantine Empire. The Qur'an came later, according to the authors, as a product of 8th-century edits of various materials drawn from a variety of Judeo-Christian and Middle-Eastern sources, and Muhammad was the herald of Umar, "the redeemer," a Judaic messiah.

==== Patricia Crone, Meccan Trade and the Rise of Islam (1987) ====
In Meccan Trade and the Rise of Islam, Patricia Crone argues that Mecca could not have been a hub of overland trade from Southern Arabia to Syria during the time of Muhammad, for several reasons. It was not on the overland trade route from Southern Arabia to Syria, and even if it had been, that land route was not very important compared to the maritime trade route and had ceased to be used by the end of the 2nd century CE. Meccan trade, except for Yemeni perfume, was mainly in cheap leather goods and clothing and occasionally in basic foodstuffs, which were not exported north to Syria, which already had plenty of them, but to nearby regions. Furthermore, the literature of Arab trading partners who kept track of Arab affairs (Greek, Latin, Syriac, Aramaic, and Coptic) makes no mention "of Quraysh (the tribe of Muhammad) and their trading center Mecca." All of that suggests traditional "histories" passed down about Muhammad's life as a Meccan merchant traveling far and wide and suffering at the hands of powerful Meccan tribes are "pure fabrications" and that it is far more likely Muhammad's career took place not in Mecca and Medina or in Southwestern Arabia at all but in Northwestern Arabia.

==== Hans Jansen, De Historische Mohammed (2005/2007) ====
The arguments against the plausibility of the classical Islamic traditions about Islam's beginnings were summarized by Hans Jansen in his work De Historische Mohammed. Jansen points out that the cryptic nature of the Quran, which usually alludes to events, rather than describing them, and seldom describes the situation for which a revelation was made causes the historically questionable traditions to be very important to interpret and understand the Quran. Many Islamic traditions came into being long after Muhammad on the basis of mere guesses for what situation a Quranic verse had been revealed. Because of those historically questionable traditions, the interpretation of the Quran has been restricted ever since.

=== Non-scholarly ===
Ibn Warraq, an author known for his criticism of Islam, compiled several revisionist essays in his book The Quest for the Historical Muhammad. Fred Donner, reviewing the book, noted that by favoring Wansbrough's school of revisionism, the author presents a "one-sided selection," which fails to consider the challenges to that line of revisionism. The result is "a book that is likely to mislead many an unwary general reader."

Robert B. Spencer, a notable critic of Islam, wrote a popular work on Islamic revisionist studies titled Did Muhammad Exist?.

== Heyday of the revisionist school ==
Hoyland, who seeks to compromise between revisionism and traditionalism, believes the "heyday" of revisionism occurred sometime before the 1980s, when the "public profile of Islam" increased "massively," and, Hoyland argues, the "left-leaning" tendency of Western academics "shy" of criticizing Islam and "favored the traditionalist approach," while "pushing skeptics/revisionists to become more extreme."

The designation revisionism was coined first by the opponents of the new academic movement and is still used by them partially with a less than positive connotation. Then, the media took up that designation to call the new movement with a concise catchword. Today, the adherents of the new movement also use Revisionism to designate themselves, but it mostly written in quotation marks and with a slightly self-mocking undertone.

== Criticism of revisionism ==
The consequent historical-critical analysis of early Islam met severe resistance in the beginning since theses with far-reaching meaning were published. Especially Patricia Crone's and Michael Cook's book Hagarism (1977) stirred up a lot of harsh criticism. Important representatives of revisionism like Crone and Cook meanwhile distanced themselves from such radical theses.

Criticism is expressed by researchers like Tilman Nagel, who aims at the speculative nature of some theses and shows that some revisionists lack some scholarly standards. On the other hand, Nagel accepts the basic impulse of the new movement to put more emphasis on the application of the historical-critical method. A certain tendency to take revisionists seriously becomes obvious such as by the fact that opponents address their criticism not any longer to "revisionism" alone but to "extreme revisionism" or "ultra-revisionism."

Gregor Schoeler discusses the revisionist school and depicts the early controversies. Schoeler considers revisionism to be too radical, but he welcomes the general impulse: "To have made us thinking about this all and much more remarkable things for the first time—or again, is without any doubt a merit of the new generation of the 'skeptics'."

François de Blois, who is Teaching Fellow at the Department of the Study of Religions at SOAS, London, rejects the application of the historical-critical method to Islamic texts. He argues that method was developed with Christian texts in mind and thus, although it has been accepted as sound to be applied universally to any text, religious or not, there is no reason to apply the method to Islamic texts.

== See also ==
- Historiography of early Islam
- History of the Quran
- Narratives of Islamic Origins
- Nabataeans
