= Suliman Bashear =

Druze Arab scholar

Suliman Bashear PhD (Arabic: سليمان بشير, Sulaymān Bashīr, Hebrew: סולימאן בשיר; 1947–October 1991) was a leading Druze Arab scholar, writer, and professor, who taught at Birzeit University, An-Najah National University, and the Hebrew University of Jerusalem. Bashear was noted for his work on the early historiography of Islam.

== Life and education ==
Bashear was born in the northern Palestinian village of Maghar. Bashear studied at the Hebrew University of Jerusalem for his BA (1971) and MA (1973). In 1976, he received his PhD at the University of London for his dissertation ‘Communism in the Arab East’, which was published both in Arabic and in English.

He died in October 1991 following a heart attack. In the last six years of his life, he had produced fifteen published articles.

== Thesis ==
Bashear made international headlines when he was injured after allegedly being thrown from a second-story window by his students at the An-Najah National University in Nablus in the West Bank in response to his argument that Islam developed as a religion gradually within the historical context of Judaism and Christianity, rather than being the revelation of a prophet. However, this incident has been denied by Bashear’s wife, Dr. Lily Feidy, where she wrote in an email message, “Please note that Suliman was never attacked or injured by his students; nor was he physically attacked by anybody else. I have been asked this question a million times”.

Bashear's historiography of early Islam considered not only the development of religious customs and beliefs, but also traced how later generations recast the past in order to meet the needs of their own era. Like the work of Patricia Crone, Michael Cook, John Wansbrough, Yehuda D. Nevo, Martin Hinds, Gerald Hawting, Christoph Luxenberg, Gerd R. Puin, Andrew Rippin, Günter Lüling, and other historiographers of early Islam, Bashear's research challenged what he considered to be the myth of a unified beginning Islam.

== Books and articles ==
- Communism in the Arab East: 1918–28. London: Ithaca Press, 1980.
- Muqaddimah fī at-tārīkh al-ākhar: Naḥ̣ḥwa qirāʾah jadīdah l-il-riwāyah al-Islāmiyyah [An Introduction to the other history: Towards a new reading of Islamic tradition]. Jerusalem, 1984. [Arabic]
- ‘Qurʾān 2:114 and Jerusalem’. Bulletin of the School of Oriental and African Studies 52.2 (1989): 215-238.
- ‘Yemen in early Islam: An Examination of non-tribal traditions’. Arabica 36.3 (November 1989): 327-361.
- ‘Abraham’s sacrifice of his son and related issues’. Der Islam 67 (1990): 243-277.
- ‘The Title «fārūq» and its association with ʿUmar I’. Studia Islamica 72 (1990): 47-70.
- ‘Apocalyptic and other materials on early Muslim-Byzantine wars: A Review of Arabic sources’. Journal of the Royal Asiatic Society 3rd s. 1.2 (1991): 173-207.
- ‘ʿĀshūrā, an early Muslim fast’. Zeitschrift der Deutschen Morgenländischen Gesellschaft 141.2 (1991): 281-316.
- ‘The Mission of Diḥya al-Kalbī and the situation in Syria’. Jerusalem Studies in Arabic and Islam 14 (1991): 84-114.
- ‘Qibla musharriqa and early Muslim prayer in churches’. The Muslim World 81 (1991): 267-282.
- ‘Riding beasts on divine missions: An Examination of the ass and camel traditions’. Journal of Semitic Studies 36.1 (Spring 1991): 37-75.
- ‘The Images of Mecca: A Case study in Muslim iconography’. Le Muséon 105 (1992): 361-377.
- ‘Muslim apocalypses and the Hour: A Case-study in traditional interpretation’. Israel Oriental Studies 13 (1993): 75-99.
- ‘On the origin and development of zakāt in early Islam’. Arabica 40 (1993): 84-113.
- ‘Qunūt in tafsīr and ḥadīth literatures’. Jerusalem Studies in Arabic and Islam 19 (1995): 36-65.
- Arabs and others in early Islam. Princeton: Darwin Press, 1997.
- Judhur al-wisayah al-Urduniyah: Dirasah fi wathaʾiq al-Arshif as-Sihyuni. Beirut: Sharikat Quds, 2001. [Arabic]
- Studies in early Islamic tradition. Collected Studies in Arabic and Islam. Jerusalem: Max Schloessinger Memorial Foundation, Hebrew University of Jerusalem, 2004.
  - This collects thirteen published articles listed above, as well as the following two unpublished studies: "Ḥanīfiyya and the ḥajj" and "Jesus in an early Muslim shahāda and related issues: A New perspective".

== Bibliography ==
- Stewart, Devin J. Review of Suliman Bashear, Studies in early Islamic tradition (Jerusalem: Max Schloessinger Memorial Foundation, Hebrew University of Jerusalem, 2004). International Journal of Middle East Studies 41.2 (May 2009): 321-322.

== See also ==
- List of Israeli Druze
