= Hans Jansen =

Dutch academic (1942–2015)

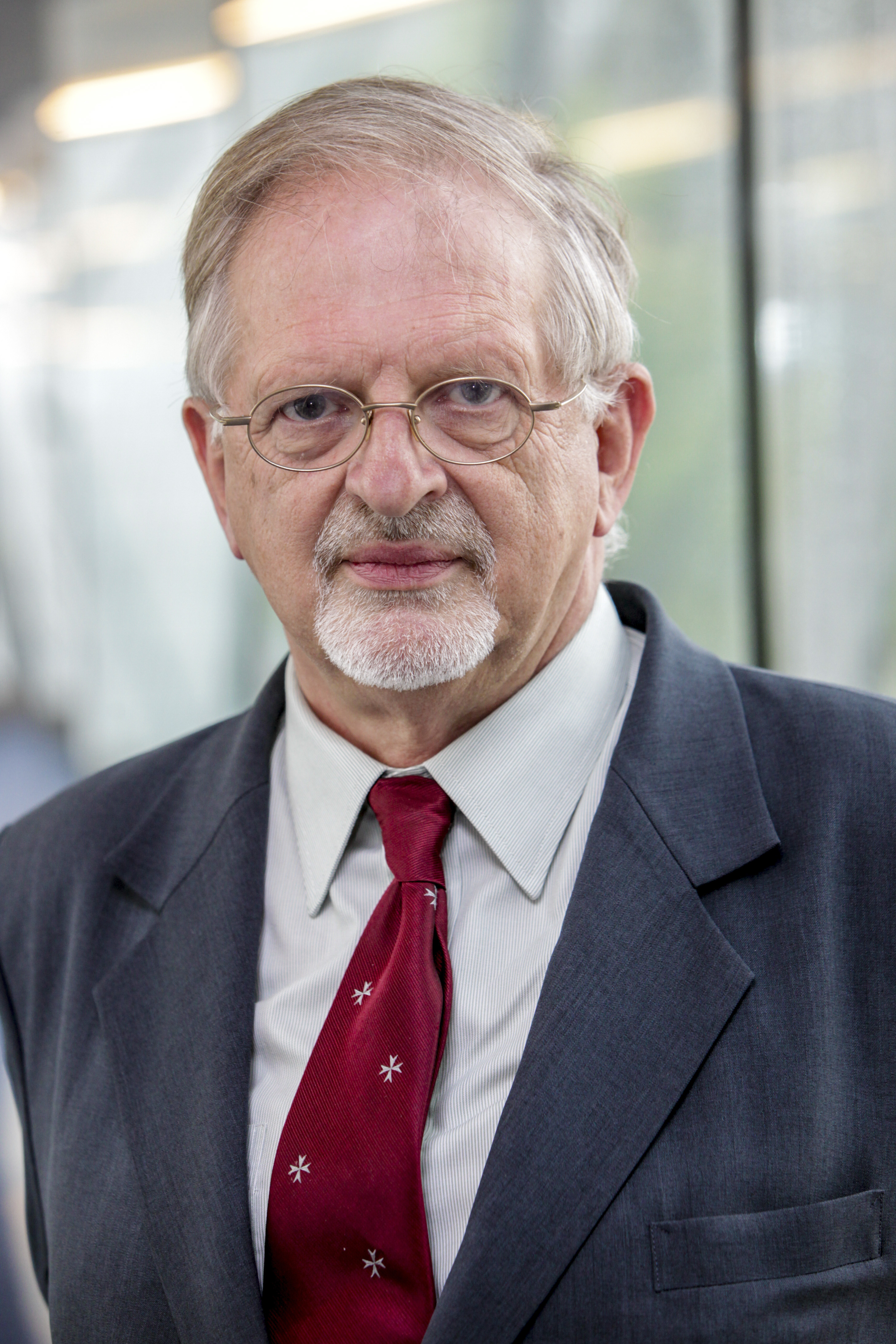

Member of the European Parliament
- In office 1 July 2014 – 5 May 2015
- Constituency: Netherlands

Personal details
- Born: Johannes Juliaan Gijsbert Jansen; 17 November 1942 Amsterdam, Netherlands
- Died: 5 May 2015 (aged 72) Amsterdam, Netherlands
- Party: Party for Freedom
- Children: 3
- Education: University of Amsterdam (Master of Letters); Leiden University (Doctor of Letters)
- Occupation: Author; columnist; linguist; teacher; professor; politician

Johannes Juliaan Gijsbert "Hans" Jansen (Note: The phrase Johannes Juliaan Gijsbert Jansen is pronounced [joːˈɦɑnə ˈɕylijaːŋ ˈɣɛizbər ˈtɕɑnsə(n)]; the words in isolation are pronounced [joːˈɦɑnəs], [ˈjylijaːn], [ˈɣɛizbərt] and [ˈjɑnsə(n)]. Hans Jansen is pronounced [ɦɑɲ ˈɕɑnsə(n)]; Hans in isolation is pronounced [ɦɑns].) (17 November 1942 – 5 May 2015) was a Dutch politician, scholar of contemporary Islam and author.

Hans Jansen belonged to the "revisionists" in Islamic Studies, i.e. he fundamentally doubted the historicity of the Islamic traditions on early Islam which were written 150 to 200 years after Muhammad. Moreover, Jansen doubted the existence of Muhammad as a historical person.

== Life and career ==
Hans Jansen's parents were strict Calvinists. At the age of 17, Jansen began studying theology at the University of Amsterdam, yet changed the subject after one year to Arabic and Semitic languages. In 1966 he spent one year in Cairo in order to learn Arabic. Then he continued his studies at the University of Leiden where he received his Ph.D. in 1974.

Jansen taught at the universities of Groningen, Leiden and Amsterdam, and was director of the Dutch Research Institute in Cairo. Then he became associate professor at the University of Leiden. From 2003-2008 he was Houtsma Professor of Modern Islamic Thought at the University of Utrecht.

In 1988 Jansen converted to Catholicism. He later said that he then thought also about conversion to Islam: Islam has "a very attractive and powerful culture, a high culture, great beauty. An enormous suction effect." Jansen was married twice. His first wife Eefje van Santen was daughter of the communist politician Joop van Santen. With his second wife he had three children. One of his sons is a cabaret performer.

Jansen died of a cerebral infarction at the age of 72.

== Political commitment ==
While busy with his university studies, Jansen was member of a leftist group and left the room in protest when somebody mentioned the word "Israel". The turning point of his opinion about Islam was the assassination of Egyptian president Anwar Sadat in 1981. Some of his friends experienced the event personally.

Jansen was friend to Ayaan Hirsi Ali and Theo van Gogh. In newspaper articles, interviews and talk shows, he criticized Islam and how politics dealt with Islam. He participated in the international counter-jihad conferences in Brussels in 2007 and in 2012.

In 2008, he advised Geert Wilders about his anti-Islam movie Fitna and in 2010 he was a principal witness in the trial of Geert Wilders.

Jansen was an expert witness on the Koran and Shariah in the trial in Birmingham Magistrates Court (Crown vs Timothy Martin Burton) on 8 April 2014, which came to be known as the Birmingham Taqiyya Trial. Burton was subsequently found guilty of Racially Aggravated Harassment.

In the 2014 European Parliament election, Jansen was elected for Wilders' Party for Freedom as MEP.

== Research ==
Hans Jansen is part of the so-called "revisionist" or historical-critical line of Islamic Studies. He fundamentally doubts the historicity of the Islamic traditions on the beginning of Islam which came into being 150 to 200 years after the event.

In his main work De Historische Mohammed (not available in English), Jansen discusses chapter by chapter the depictions in the prophet's biography by Ibn Ishaq, via the recension by Ibn Hisham, which is an important text for traditional Islam. He argues that the respective depictions are not credible. Jansen asserts self-contradictions, contradictions to other historical sources, embellishments by later authors, politically or theologically motivated distortions of the depiction, symbolic meanings of allegedly historical names, literary construction of the depiction according e.g. to biblical models, and chronological and calendrical incredibilities. In part, Jansen only sums up what other researchers already had found.

Some examples:

- Although there were leap months at the time of Muhammad which had to be intercalated frequently into the moon calendar and which only later became abandoned (allegedly by Muhammad), not a single of the many most accurately dated events depicted by Ibn Ishaq is in a leap month.
- The precise dating of so many events by an author who writes 150 years later is not very credible.
- The depiction of a strong relationship between Muhammad and his wife Aisha is motivated politically and theologically: Aisha was the daughter of Caliph Abu Bakr who became Muhammad's successor against the claims of his rival Ali. In order to legitimate this succession against the Shiites who were in favour of Ali, the relationship of Abu Bakr's daughter to Muhammad was emphasized, including that Aisha allegedly was the favourite wife of Muhammad, and that the prophet consummated marriage with Aisha allegedly at an astonishingly early age.
- The depiction of slaughtering the Jewish tribe of the Banu Quraiza is motivated politically resp. theologically: As the "treaty of Medina" shows, the Jews were initially part of the Umma and were addressed as "believers"; cf. the research of Fred Donner. When Islam later separated from Judaism, antisemitic readings of the past came into being. The threefold treason of Muhammad by three Jewish tribes is a literary construction according to biblical models, e.g. the threefold treason of Jesus by the apostle Peter, and thus is historically questionable. There are other traditions about the same event which tell that only the leaders of the tribe had been punished but not each single member of the tribe. The names of the three Jewish tribes do not occur in the "treaty of Medina". Finally, such a mass slaughtering would not have gone unnoticed, even not in Muhammad's time, and especially not considering that the victims were Jews: Jews used to live in international trading networks, and Jews are known to write down their history. Most likely, the slaughtering of the Banu Quraiza never happened.
- The depictions of Ibn Ishaq are generally known to boldly exaggerate the capacities of the prophet. According to Ibn Ishaq Muhammad always kills more enemies than stated in other traditions. Even the depiction of the prophet's male potency who allegedly could satisfy all his wives in one night is exaggerated in a questionable way. Of the same category is the depiction of Muhammad as an illiterate person. The revelation of the Quranic text is all the more miraculous and the capacity of the prophet is all the more astonishing if Muhammad was an illiterate person.
- The account of Muhammad's message to the emperor of Byzantium, that he should convert to Islam, retrospectively justifies the Arabic expansion as a religious, Islamic expansion.

Jansen states that the historically questionable traditions are of great importance for the interpretation of the Quran. The Quran mostly does not reveal the situation for which a revelation was made. The historical context is merely indicated, at best. Many Islamic traditions came into being long after Muhammad on the basis of mere guesses for what situation a Quranic verse had been revealed. By the historically questionable traditions the interpretation of Quran is restricted since then.

In the epilogue, Jansen concluded that Muhammad did not exist as a historical person. Thus, Jansen belongs to a minority within the "revisionist" school which supports this position. The book De Historische Mohammed was reviewed positively e.g. by Prof. Karl-Heinz Ohlig. A respectful but critical review was given e.g. by Stefan Weidner on Qantara.de. The historian Dan Diner highly acclaimed Hans Jansen's Mohammed as a work of enlightenment.

== Publications ==
Books in Dutch:

- Inleiding tot de Islam (1987)
- De Koran uit het Arabisch Vertaald door Prof. dr. J.H. Kramers (1992) (edited by Asad Jaber & Johannes J.G.Jansen)
- Nieuwe Inleiding tot de Islam (1998)
- Het Nut van God (2001)
- God heeft gezegd: terreur, tolerantie en de onvoltooide modernisering van de islam (2003)
- De radicaal-islamitische ideologie: Van Ibn Taymiyya tot Osama ben Laden, Oratie Universiteit van Utrecht, 3 februari 2004
- Islam: een hoorcollege over de islamitische godsdienst en cultuur (2005, audio-cd)
- De historische Mohammed: de Mekkaanse verhalen (2005)
- De historische Mohammed: de verhalen uit Medina (2007)
- Bombrieven (2008, correspondence with Abdul-Jabbar van de Ven)
- Islam voor varkens, apen, ezels en andere beesten (2008)
- Zelf Koran lezen (2008)
- Eindstrijd, edited by Jansen & Snel (2009)

Books in English (Many other titles are not yet available in English):

- The Interpretation of the Koran in Modern Egypt (Leiden: E.J. Brill, 1974)
- The Neglected Duty: The Creed of Sadat’s Assassins and Islamic Resurgence in the Middle East (New York: Macmillan, 1986)
- The Dual Nature of Islamic Fundamentalism (London: Hurst & Company, 1997)
- Why shouldn't Israel exist in the Middle East? A Synopsis (Soesterberg, Nederland: Aspekt Publishers, 2017)

Columns

- For the Dutch blog GeenStijl.nl
