= Norman Calder =

British historian of Islam (1950–1998)

Norman Calder (1950–1998) was a British historian.

== Life ==
Norman Calder was born in Buckie, Moray, Scotland, United Kingdom. In 1969 Calder went to Wadham College, Oxford, and received a first in Arabic and Persian language in 1972. Then he went to the Middle East for four years where he worked as an English teacher. Back in Britain, he joined the School of Oriental and African Studies SOAS in London and made his Ph.D. under John Wansbrough. In 1980 he went to the University of Manchester to the Department of Middle Eastern Studies. There, he was Senior Lecturer in Arabic until his death. As a student of Wansbrough, Calder belongs to the so-called "revisionist" school of Islamic Studies.

== Research ==
Calder concentrated on Islamic Law in the early times of Islam. He analysed the earliest texts of Islamic Law applying historical-critical method, especially literary criticism. He found that the earliest texts of Islamic Law were not written by a single author but were products of a longer process of editorial work of several authors. Only later had the texts been attributed to some authoritative personality. Calder determined the date of these texts to the first half of the third century in Islamic chronology, i.e. to the middle of the 9th century. This means that the earliest texts about Islamic Law were written 200 years after the founding of Islam itself. Calder was a representative of the Revisionist School of Islamic Studies.

== Works ==
- Studies in Early Muslim Jurisprudence (1993).
- Classical Islam: A Sourcebook of Religious Literature (2003), edited and translated, with Jawid Mojaddedi and Andrew Rippin.
- Interpretation and Jurisprudence in Medieval Islam (2006; eBook 2022), edited by Jawid Mojaddedi and Andrew Rippin.
- Islamic Jurisprudence in the Classical Era (2010), edited by Colin Imber.
