= Günter Lüling =

German theologian

Günter Lüling (25 October 1928 – 10 September 2014) was a German theologian, philological scholar (Dr. in Arabistics and Islamics) and pioneer in the study of early Quranic studies and Islamic origins. From 1962 to 1965 he was the Director of the German Goethe-Institut in Aleppo, Syria. Although he came from a German Protestant family, Lüling did not consider himself a Christian in the traditional Orthodox or Evangelical sense of the term, adhering instead to non-Trinitarian theological and angelological Christology theories.

== Thesis ==
A student of Albert Schweitzer and Martin Werner (1887–1964), he attempted to demonstrate the textual link between pre-Islamic Christian hymnody in the Middle East and the composition of the Qur'an. He theorized that the early believers of what later became Orthodox Islam were one of the last communities sticking to a — what Lüling believed to be the true — non-Trinitarian Christian creed, for whom Jesus and the Holy Spirit were not divine. Their theological positions were adopted by later generations and evolved to become an ethno-centric religion of Arabs — Islam (i.e. "religion of Abraham and the tribes"). He also proposed that the Meccan and Central Arabian adversaries of Muhammad, the "mushrikun", (the "associators" or those who "associate" other gods to God), were not polytheist pagans but Trinitarian Christians — the associates being Jesus and the Holy Spirit. In early post-prophetic times mushrikun was reinterpreted from its original meaning to become "idolators" or "pagans".

Lüling viewed Muhammad as a reformer whose role was to combat Hellenized Trinitarian Christianity through his anti-Trinitarian message. In this regard, Muhammad allegedly drew upon certain original anti-Trinitarian Christian hymns, which, according to Lüling, account for one-third of the Qur’an, as well as his own Islamic revelations, which constitute the remaining two-thirds. In Lüling’s view, however, Muhammad’s successors altered his message, just as Christians had altered the message of Christ. They concealed the Christian origins of these hymns and the fact that Muhammad’s opponents had been Trinitarian Christians.

An example of what Lüling believes to be the underlying Christian hymn of the Quran is Quran 96 (Al-ʻAlaq), which Lüling believes was originally addressed to Christians not Muhammad. With his approach of research Lüling was an early representative of the "Saarbrücken School" which is part of the Revisionist School of Islamic Studies.

=== Dispute ===
According to Alan Dundes, in 1970 Lüling submitted a doctoral dissertation which suggested that the Quran "contained evidence of traces of poetic strophic" (i.e. verse-repeating or chorus form, .. a song structure in which all verses or stanzas of the text are sung to the same music, as opposed to "through-composed" where new music written for every stanza) texts. Dundes writes that Lüling's view was "not in accord with orthodox Islamic tradition", and by 1972, "he was officially dismissed" from the University of Erlangen, where he had submitted his thesis. A lawsuit filed to overturn the dismissal carried on for six years but "did not succeed in reversing the university's action".

Lüling himself explained in the preface to the English-language edition of his work, published in 2003, that the reason behind its rejection was that his entire investigation of the Qur’an had been based on Schweitzer’s and Werner’s theories concerning the non-Trinitarian nature and angelological Christology of early Christianity, which had been criticized and rejected in German academic and theological circles.

=== Critical receptions ===
Another German revisionist scholar of the Qur’an, Christoph Luxenberg, acknowledged the value of Lüling’s approach but criticized his methods, arguing that his work had failed to achieve its objectives:

This study is, after that of Jacob Barth's, a further, more extensive attempt to elucidate obscure passages of the Koran by changing certain diacritical dots. Lüling's thesis depends on the one hand on the supposition of an "Ur-Qur'an" (Original Koran), in which the author sees, not without reason, Christian hymns, which he then undertakes to reconstruct. On the other hand, as to his philological method for elucidating obscure passages of the Koran, Lüling supposes a pre-Islamic Christian Arabic koiné, but one whose essential nature he fails to define. However, by hasing himself on an essentially theological argument to achieve the goal of reconstruction and elucidation, Lüling only occasionally succeeds and is, on the whole, unable to solve the enigma of the language of the Koran. His merit is, however, to have re-posed the question of the nature of the language of the Koran. The kernel of his thesis of a Christian "Original Koran" would have engendered further research, had it not been rejected categorically by the representatives ofthis discipline in Germany.

== Religious views ==
According to his own testimony, Günter Lüling was an opponent of traditional Christian dogmas, both those upheld by the Roman Catholic Church and those embraced by Protestant churches. Following Warner's line of thought, he argued that the Christian religion had undergone a process of “de-eschatologization,” Hellenization, and falsification of Jesus' original message. In this respect, Lüling did not consider himself a Christian, either in the traditional Orthodox or in the Evangelical sense of the term, rejecting the Trinity and the divinity of Christ, which he regarded as dogmatic innovations. He even describes himself as a mixture of a Jew, a Christian, a Muslim, and a Buddhist, “with even some worn bits of an atheist and polytheist.” Furthermore, in the preface to his work about the Qur'an, he criticizes traditional interpretations of the New Testament, particularly the account of the Last Supper and the institution of the Eucharist.

== Bibliography ==
- Kritisch-exegetische Untersuchung des Qur'antextes. Erlangen, 1970 (Thesis).
- Die Einzigartige Perle des Suwaid ben Abī Kāhil al-Yaškurī : zweiter Teil ; über die eindeutige Christlichkeit dieses in der vorislamischen Heidenzeit hochgerühmten Gedichtes. Erlangen: Lüling, 1973.
- Über den Ur-Qur'an. Ansätze zur Rekonstruktion vorislamischer christlicher Strophenlieder im Qur'an. Erlangen: Lüling, 1974.
  - Lüling, Günter (2003). A challenge to Islam for reformation: the rediscovery and reliable reconstruction of a comprehensive pre-Islamic Christian hymnal hidden in the Koran under earliest Islamic reinterpretations. New Delhi: Motilal Banarsidass Publishers. pp. 580 pages. ISBN 81-208-1952-7.. (Translation and considerable reworking of the 2. German edition 1993 of Über den Ur-Koran, 1st ed. 1974.)
  - Über den Urkoran. Ansätze zu Rekonstruktion der vorislamisch-christlichen Strophenlieder im Koran. 3rd corr. ed. Erlangen: Lüling, 2004. ISBN 3-922317-18-9
- Zwei Aufsätze zur Religions- und Geistesgeschichte. (Contains: 1. Der vorgeschichtliche Sinn des Wortes "Metall". 2. Avicenna und seine buddhistische Herkunft.) Erlangen: Lüling, 1977.
- Der christliche Kult an der vorislamischen Kaaba als Problem der Islamwissenschaft und christlichen Theologie. Erlangen: Lüling, 1977.
- Die Wiederentdeckung des Propheten Muhammad: eine Kritik am "christlichen" Abendland. Erlangen: Lüling, 1981. ISBN 3-922317-07-3
- Das Passahlamm und die altarabische "Mutter der Blutrache", die Hyäne: d. Passahopfer als Initiationsritus zu Blutrache u. heiligem Krieg. In ZRGG 34/1982, S. 131 - 147; (Sonderdr. aus ZRGG 34/1982). ISBN 3-922317-11-1
- Sprache und archaisches Denken : neun Aufsätze zur Geistes- und Religionsgeschichte (Language and archaic thinking: nine essays on the history of ideas and religion). Erlangen: Lüling, 1985. ISBN 3-922317-13-8
- Der christliche Kult an der vorislamischen Kaaba als Problem der Islamwissenschaft und christlichen Theologie. 2nd corr. ed. Erlangen: Lüling, 1992. ISBN 3-922317-16-2.
- Sprache und Archaisches Denken. Aufsätze zur Geistes- und Religionsgeschichte. Erlangen: Lüling, 2005. 2nd enlarged ed. ISBN 3-922317-19-7
- Reynolds, Gabriel Said (2008). "Introduction, Quranic studies and its controversies". In Reynolds, Gabriel Said (ed.). The Quran in its Historical Context. Routledge.

== See also ==
- Michael Cook
- Patricia Crone
- Gerd R. Puin
- John Wansbrough
