= Abu al-Futuh =

Abu al-Futuh (or Abu'l-Futuh, Abu ʾl-Futūḥ, etc., from Arabic أبو الفتوح, meaning "father of futuh") may refer to:

- Abu'l-Futuh al-Hasan ibn Ja'far, sharif of Mecca from 994/5 until 1038/9
- Abu al-Futuh al-Razi (12th century), Shiʿite theologian
- As-Salih Ayyub (1205–1249), Ayyubid ruler of Egypt from 1240 to 1249
- Baibars, nicknamed Abu al-Futuh, Mamluk sultan of Egypt from 1260 to 1277
