= Karl-Heinz Ohlig =

German catholic theologian (1938–2024)

Karl-Heinz Ohlig (15 September 1938 – 14 January 2024) was a German professor of Religious Studies and the History of Christianity at the University of Saarland, Germany.

== Life and career ==
Ohlig was the co-editor with Gerd Rudiger Puin of the book Die dunklen Anfänge. Neue Forschungen zur Entstehung und frühen Geschichte des Islam ["The Hidden Origins of Islam: New Research Into Its Early History" (Hans Schiller Verlag, 2005/Prometheus Books 2008)], which argues that Islam was not originally conceived as a distinct religion.

Ohlig and Puin's thesis propounds that according to the evidence of Arab coinage, and the inscription in the Dome of the Rock in the late 7th century, with the letters MHMT and the term Muhammad meaning "the revered" or "the praiseworthy" and the Dome's bearing Christian symbols such as crosses, it suggests that the term Muhammad was a Christian honorific title referring to Jesus, as in the hymn of the mass ("praise be to he that comes...")

With his approach of research Ohlig was a representative of the "Saarbrücken School" which is part of the Revisionist School of Islamic Studies.

Ohlig died on 14 January 2024, at the age of 85.

== Works ==
- Ohlig, Karl-Heinz (2002). One or three? : from the father of Jesus to the Trinity. Frankfurt am Main: P. Lang. ISBN 0-8204-6063-X. OCLC 52377564.
- Ohlig, Karl-Heinz; Puin, Gerd-R. (2005). Die dunklen Anfänge : neue Forschungen zur Entstehung und frühen Geschichte des Islam (in German). Berlin: H. Schiler. ISBN 3-89930-128-5. OCLC 62701136.
- Ohlig, Karl-Heinz (2007). Der frühe Islam : eine historisch-kritische Rekonstruktion anhand zeitgenössischer Quellen (in German). Berlin: Verlag H. Schiler. ISBN 978-3-89930-090-1. OCLC 84900629.

== See also ==
- Historicity of Muhammad
- Christoph Luxenberg
