= John Wansbrough =

American historian and professor (1928–2002)

- Born: John Edward Wansbrough; February 19, 1928; Peoria, Illinois, U.S.
- Died: June 10, 2002 (aged 74); Montaigu-de-Quercy, France
- Education: Harvard University
- Occupation: Historian

John Edward Wansbrough (February 19, 1928 – June 10, 2002) was an American historian of Islamic origins and Quranic studies and professor who taught at the University of London's School of Oriental and African Studies (SOAS), where he was vice chancellor from 1985 to 1992.

Wansbrough is credited with founding the revisionist school of Islamic studies through his fundamental criticism of the historical credibility of the Quran and other early Islamic texts, especially regarding the classical Islamic narratives concerning the early history of Islam and his attempt to develop an alternative, historically more credible version of Islam's beginnings. He argued in general for a methodological skepticism of the authorship of early Islamic sources, and most famously that the Quran was written and collected over a 200-year period, and should be dated not from the 1st-century AH Hijaz of Western Arabia, but from the 2nd/3rd century AH in Abbasid Iraq.

== Life ==
Wansbrough was born in Peoria, Illinois to a Jewish family. He completed his studies at Harvard University, and spent the rest of his academic career at SOAS. He died at Montaigu-de-Quercy, France. Among his students were Andrew Rippin, Norman Calder, Gerald R. Hawting, Patricia Crone and Michael Cook.

== Research and thesis ==
Wansbrough work stresses two points—that Muslim literature is late, dating more than a century and a half after the death of Muhammad, and that Islam is a complex phenomenon which must have taken many generations to fully develop.

When Wansbrough began studying early Islamic manuscripts and the Quran, he realized that the early Islamic texts addressed an audience which was familiar with Jewish and Christian texts, and that Jewish and Christian theological problems were discussed. Criticism of "infidels" in this literature he reasoned was addressed not to idolaters and pagans, but to monotheists who did not live monotheism "purely". Those observations did not fit to the Islamic narratives on Islam's beginnings, which depicted Islam as coming into being within a polytheistic society.

Wansbrough also found that early Muslim legal arguments did not refer to the Quran, along with other indication that there was not "a stable scriptural text" in Rashidun and Umayyad eras, suggesting the Quran as a source of law had been backdated.

Wansbrough analyzed the classical Islamic narratives which had been written 150 to 200 years after the Islamic prophet Muhammad died with the historical-critical method, especially literary criticism. Thus, he claimed countless proofs that the texts are not historical accounts but later literary constructions in the sense of the concept of a "salvation history" (Heilsgeschichte) of the Old Testament, whose actual historical core is meager and cannot be detected.

On that basis, Wansbrough developed the theory parts of which he qualified as "conjectural "provisional" and "tentative and emphatically provisional", as it implied (in the words of historian Herbert Berg) that "neither the Quran nor Islam is a product of Muhammad or even Arabia", nor were the original Arab conquerors of the Umayyad empire actual Muslims. He postulated that Islam did not come into being as a new religion on its own but derived from conflicts of various Jewish-Christian sects and from the need for a (fixed) sacred scripture upon which to base the Abbasid code of law: "The employment of scriptural Shawahid in halakhic controversy required a fixed and unambiguous text of revelation ... the result was the Quranic canon."

The Quran was written and collected in a long process over 200 years and thus cannot be attributed to Muhammad, being more recent than traditional accounts date it. The person of Muhammad would be a later invention, or at least, Muhammad cannot be related to the Quran. In later times, Muhammad had only the function to provide an own identity to the new religious movement according to the role model of a Prophet of the Old Testament.

Thus, Wansbrough argued that the Quran "became a source for biography, exegesis, jurisprudence and grammar" around the 2nd/3rd century AH in Abbasid Iraq (not the 1st-century Hijaz, Western Arabia, as traditionally dated and located). Specifically Wansbrough thinks it must have been completed by Ibn Hisham around the time he composed his Sīra of Muhammad because of the "preponderance of Quran-based (historicised) narratives therein". Wansbrough thought evidence for the "seventh-century Hijaz" as the location of the Islam's origins was "[b]ereft of archaeological witness and hardly attested in pre-Islamic Arabic or external sources", but instead owed "its historiographical existence almost entirely to the creative endeavour of Muslim and Orientalist scholarhship".

Wansbrough argued that variants of Quranic text are so minor that they are not "recollections of ancient texts that differed from the Uthmanic text" but the outcome of exegesis. "Variants" in the form of multiple versions of the same story within the text of the Quran "are present in such quantity" that they rule out the theory of an "Urtext" (original text) or "even that of a composite edition produced by deliberations in committee". And also that classical Arabic was developed later than the colloquial forms, "contemporaneously with the codification of the Quran."

== Reception and critique ==
Wansbrough's theories have neither been "widely accepted" nor rejected, according to Gabriel Said Reynolds. By his fundamental criticism of the historical credibility of the classical Islamic narratives concerning Islam's beginnings and his attempt to develop an alternative, historically more credible version of Islam's beginnings, Wansbrough founded the so-called "revisionist" school of Islamic Studies. According to historian Andrew Rippin and religious scholar Herbert Berg lack of interest by non-Muslim scholars in Wansbrough's ideas can be traced to the fact that Wansbrough strays from the path of least effort and resistance in scholarship by questioning the vast corpus of Islamic literature on the history of Islam, the Quran, and Muhammad; "destroying" what had been historical facts without replacing them with new ones; calling for using the techniques of Biblical criticism, requiring competency in other languages than Arabic, familiarity with "religious frameworks" other than Islam, and locations other "than Arabia on the eve of Islam" and treading on very sacred territory in Islam.

Wansbrough's theory about the long process (over 200 years) of writing and collection of the Quran is today considered untenable by many because of the discoveries of Early Quranic manuscripts many of which were tested with radiocarbon analysis (around 2010–2014) and have been dated to the seventh century CE.

== Selected publications ==
- Quranic Studies: Sources and Methods of Scriptural Interpretation (Oxford, 1977)
- The Sectarian Milieu: Content and Composition of Islamic Salvation History (Oxford, 1978)
- Res Ipsa Loquitur: History and Mimesis (1987)
- Lingua Franca in the Mediterranean (Curzon Press, 1996; Reprint by World Scientific Publishing, 2012)

== Influence ==
Students and scholars who also doubt the traditional view of the genesis of the Quran include:

- Michael Cook
- Patricia Crone
- Martin Hinds
- Gerald Hawting
- Christoph Luxenberg
- Gerd R. Puin
- Andrew Rippin

Others who are said to have been influenced by his work include Yehuda D. Nevo, Norman Calder, Joseph van Ess, Christopher Buck, and Claude Gilliot.

His line of research was investigated in Egypt by Nasr Abu Zayd, but he left Egypt following death threats generated by his conclusions about the Qur'an.
