= Did Muhammad Exist? =

2012 book by Robert Spencer

Did Muhammad Exist?: An Inquiry Into Islam's Obscure Origins
- Author: Robert Spencer
- Language: English
- Publisher: ISI Books
- Publication date: 2012
- Pages: 254
- ISBN: 978-1610170611

Did Muhammad Exist?: An Inquiry Into Islam's Obscure Origins is a 2012 book by Robert Spencer that questions the historicity of Muhammad. Spencer says there is "considerable reason to question the historicity of Muhammad." A "revised and expanded" edition was published in 2021.

== Reception ==
Aymenn Jawad Al-Tamimi wrote in Middle East Quarterly "Without indulging in polemics or pushing a partisan political agenda, the author simply investigates the question of whether we can really trust the traditional Islamic accounts for the life of Muhammad and the supposed early days of Islam during the Arab conquests."

In The Washington Times, Peter Hannaford wrote that Spencer has "engaged in concerted detective work of a scholarly nature", and that "his book is no polemic. It is a serious quest for facts." Hannaford notes that the first biography of Muhammad was written 128 years after his supposed death by Ibn Ishaq, and that "none of the early accounts by peoples conquered by the Arab warriors use the words Islam, Muhammad or Koran".

In The Catholic World Report J. Mark Nicovich questioned Spencer's claim that Islam's historical origins had not been subjected to "historical criticism on any significant scale", and said that Spencer's work is "fatally flawed by numerous logical fallacies and poor source criticism."

Tariq Aziz and Muhammad Shahbaz Manj said in the journal Rahat-ul-Quloob that Western writers such as Spencer have "generally been motivated by hostile criticism and religious and historical prejudice of the west." The authors said they reject "Spencer’s objections, proves that Qur’ān and Hadith are the most authentic and reliable sources of Sirah"
