= Futuh =

Early Arab conquests of Egypt, Syria etc

In classical Islamic literature the futūḥ were the early Arab-Muslim conquests of Egypt, Syria, Mesopotamia, etc. which facilitated the spread of Islam and Islamic civilization.

Futūḥ (Arabic script فتوح, singular fatḥ فتح) is an Arabic word with the literal meaning of "openings", as in "liberation".

== Ideology/etymology ==
As is clear from the literal meaning of the word, futūḥ is a term with a strong bias in favor of the conquests it signifies, implying their general beneficence and legitimacy. Historian Bernard Lewis describes the meaning of futūḥ within classic Islamic thought:

These were not seen as conquests in the vulgar sense of territorial acquisitions, but as the overthrow of impious regimes and illegitimate hierarchies, and the "opening" of their peoples to the new revelation and dispensation... The use of the root ftḥ is thus not unlike the 20th century use of the verb "liberate", and is indeed sometimes replaced by the latter verb (ḥarrara) in modern Arabic writing on early Islamic history. The Arabic verb ghalaba, "conquer", with its connotation of overwhelming by means of superior force, is sometimes used in early accounts of the Muslim conquests, but only in the context of actual military operations...
Underlying this usage, clearly, is a concept of the essential rightfulness or legitimacy of the Muslim advance and the subsequent illegitimacy of Muslim retreat before infidel conquest... The advance of Muslim power is thus an opening or a liberation, to give free scope to this divinely implanted propensity.

== Futūḥ literature ==
Many histories from the classical period of Islamic civilization dealing with the early conquests have futūḥ in their title and are considered to form their own genre of literature, called futūḥ reports. Like many other histories from the early period, the futūḥ reports contain a mixture of genres and material, with some clearly of an administrative, religio-legal, philosophical, or edificatory nature. For example, a common feature of the genre is an account of the opposing ambassador's first impression of the Arab army in which he remarks favorably upon the primitive virtues of these early Muslim warriors, thus implicitly criticizing the luxury and over-refinement of the author's own time.

The following is a partial list of these histories:

- Futūh Misr (Conquests of Egypt) by Ibn 'Abd al-Hakam
- Futūh al-Sham (Conquests of Syria) by al-Azdi
- Futūh al-Iraq (Conquests of Iraq) by al-Waqidi
- Futuh al-Habasha (Conquests of Abyssinia) by Arab Faqīh
- Futuh al-Buldan (Conquests of the Lands) by Al-Baladhuri

== Impact ==
The impact of the futūḥ conquests was immense, not least of all on the conquerors themselves, who incorporated many features of the advanced cultures they absorbed into what eventually became classic Islamic civilization.

Among the conquered peoples, the upheavals: Islamization and Arabization. The former occurred as Islam became a society's regnant religio-political framework. The latter occurred as Arab customs and the Arab language became widely adopted by a population. Though the two developments often occurred in tandem, the expression of one did not necessarily mean the expression of the other. Many Middle Eastern Christians, for example were Arabized but never Islamicized, while the Persians were Islamicized but did not Arabize.

Of the two upheavals, Islamization had the greater impact on social and cultural identity. In all cases Islamization led to a people's near total rejection of their pagan, pre-Islamic past, such that their ancestral achievements and heritage were either forgotten or actively denigrated. When in the 19th Century European Orientalists began recovering this past, their findings were at first ignored by the Muslim residents of the Near East:

The discovery... of the ancient past was a non-Middle Eastern enterprise and achievement, and for a long time it had no impact on the peoples of the Islamic Middle East, who remained uninterested in their own pagan past. For them, significant history began with the advent of Islam. That was their own, their true history, the history that mattered. What came before was an age of ignorance, of no value with no lesson to teach.
The Multiple Identities of the Middle East, p. 68

Though this alienation may be partially explained by the Arab cultural imperialism implicit in Islamization (as exemplified in the adoption of the Arabic script, for example), there is a more direct theological rationale for this, which is the Islamic concept of jahiliyyah, or state of ignorance and barbarity which supposedly prevailed in pre-Islamic Arabia. Readily applied by the first Islamicized peoples to their own pagan pasts, it led them to view these epochs as times of rampant impiety, ignorance, and injustice from which little of value could be gleaned.

Thus one trope of converted Muslims' perception of their own history is the depiction of the pre-Islamic political order as one of rampant exploitation and tyranny, with rulers ordering society according to malign whim rather than in humble subordinance to God's beneficent law for mankind:

Until the findings of Egyptology became known to them, all that most Egyptians knew about Pharaoh was what they learned from the Qur'an, and the image of Pharaoh in the Qur'an is much the same as in the Old Testament. For Muslims as for Christians and Jews, Pharaoh was the archetypal pagan tyrant and oppressor in which the heroes are the Banūh Isrā'īl, the children of Israel.
The Multiple Identities of the Middle East, p. 77

And in Islamic Persia, "Chosroes", from the great Persian king Khosrau II, became as strong a by-word for tyrannical pagan kingship as "Pharaoh" (though ironically the pagan destroyer of the Achaemenid Empire, Alexander the Great, was lionized thanks to an accident of Qur'anic textual sources).

Such hostile depictions of the pre-Islamic political order are a necessary complement to the ideology of futūḥ: in order for the Muslim conquests to be seen as liberatory, the social orders which they replaced had to be depicted as negatively as possible.

With the rejection of the pre-Islamic political order came the rejection of its cultural legacy as well, often expressed by the iconoclastic destruction of its monumental remains as in the recent demolition of the Buddhas of Bamyan. In Egypt, for example, the missing nose of the Great Sphinx of Giza was broken off by a fanatic Sufi when he saw the local farmers making offerings to the Sphinx. And in Iran:

...the ancient past had been forgotten and to a greater extent obliterated. In Persepolis, the ancient Persian capital, the Muslim conquerors had hacked away the faces of the Medes and Persians depicted in the friezes, seeing in them an expression of pagan idolatry. Only the most recent pre-Islamic history... was known at all, and that in a sketchy form, and from Arabic sources. The more ancient history of Iran was forgotten, and even the name of Cyrus, the founder of the Persian state, was unknown.
The Multiple Identities of the Middle East, p. 71

The popular dissemination of Orientalist discoveries led to a revision of these attitudes, however, and at least a partial reassertion of pre-Islamic identities. In Egypt, the works of native scholars such as Rifā'a Rafi' al-Tāhtawī led to renewed interest in the Pharaonic past and helped give rise to Egyptian national identity movements such as Pharaonism. Though initially derided by other Arabs as tafar'un (meaning lapsing into pharaonism), the Egyptian movements were in time emulated elsewhere:

This movement in Egypt was first opposed, condemned, even derided in other Arabic speaking countries. It was seen as something artificial, as a parochial attempt to create a little Egypt within the greater Arab or Islamic brotherhood. It was denounced by pan-Arabists as separatist, by religious people as neo-pagan, and by both as divisive. Nevertheless, the example of Egypt had an impact in other Middle Eastern lands.
The Multiple Identities of the Middle East, pp. 69–70

== Contemporary Attitudes ==
The acceptance of classical Islam's interpretation of the futūḥ conquests by the Islamicized/Arabized peoples of the Near East and beyond varies.

It has been least contentious among the Arab countries of Asia, where identity with the original Arab conquerors is strongest. In modern Arab historiography there has been a trend (in part due to the influence of Western-style nationalism), to portray the earliest conquests as liberations of Arabs (or proto-Arabs) from Sassanid/Byzantine imperial domination:

Most Arabs today are Arabized descendants of the inhabitants of pre-conquest Syria, Iraq, and Egypt, but any suggestion that Islamic culture is an Arabized development of what prevailed in those pre-conquest lands deeply offends them.
Lapidus, The Cambridge Illustrated History of the Islamic World (ISBN 0-521-66993-6), p. 24

=== North Africa ===
In North Africa, a reassertion of ethnic and linguistic identity among Berbers called Berberism has recently developed.

=== Iran ===
Despite a rich pre-Islamic political and cultural heritage, attempts at a reassertion of national identity in Iran have often met with strong resistance:

In 1971, when the Shah of Iran held a great celebration in Persepolis to commemorate the 2,500th anniversary of the foundation of the Persian monarchy by Cyrus the Great, he was vehemently attacked on Islamic religious grounds. Exalting the monarchy was bad enough, but far worse was the proclamation of a common identity with the Zoroastrian past, and a consequent redefinition of the basis of allegiance. For the shah's religious critics, the identity of the Iranians was defined by Islam, and their brothers were Muslims in other countries, not their own unbelieving and misguided ancestors.
The Multiple Identities of the Middle East, p. 75

With the overthrow of the Pahlavi dynasty in 1979, traditional notions of identity returned to Iran, as can be seen by the unabashed embrace of the classic futūḥ interpretation of Persian history in the propaganda of the Iran–Iraq War:

The Iraqis, on their side, call the Iranians Furs, a somewhat derogatory term in medieval times, with a suggestion that the Persians were the heirs of the Zoroastrians defeated at the battle of Qadisiyya in AD 637. This battle, which shattered the military power of the Iranian emperors and led to the incorporation of all their lands and peoples in the Muslim Arab Empire, is claimed with pride by both sides. For the Iraqis, it was a victory of Arabs over Persians... For the soldiers of the Islamic Republic, it was victory of Muslims over heathens, and a blessed beginning of the Islamization of the peoples of Iran.
The Political Language of Islam, p. 121

=== Indian subcontinent ===
Acceptance in Pakistan of futūḥ "salvation history" can be seen in current expressions of alienation from both the political as well as cultural legacies of its pre-Islamic past:

In September 1979, on Defense of Pakistan Day, there was a long article in the Pakistan Times on Bin Qasim as a strategist. The assessment was military, neutral, fair to the soldiers of both sides. It drew a rebuke from the chairman of the National Commission on Historical and Cultural Research.
"Employment of appropriate phraseology is necessary when one is projecting the image of a hero. Expressions such as 'invader' and 'defenders' and 'the Indian Army' fighting bravely but not being quick enough to 'fall upon the withdrawing enemy' loom large in the article. 'Had Raja Dahir defended the Indus heroically and stopped Qasim from crossing it, the history of the subcontinent might have been quite different.' One fails to understand whether the writer is applauding the victory of the hero or lamenting the defeat of his rival?"

Among the Believers, p. 141

The excavated city of Mohenjo-Daro... is one of the archaeological glories of Pakistan and the world. The excavations are now being damaged by waterlogging and salinity, and appeals for money have been made to world organizations. A feature letter in the Dawn offered its own ideas for the site. Verses from the Koran, the writer said, should be engraved and set up in Mohenjo-Daro in "appropriate places": "Say (unto them, O Mohammed): Travel in the land and see the nature of the sequel for the guilty ... Say (O Mohammed, to the disbelievers): Travel in the land and see the nature of the consequence for those who were before you. Most of them were idolators."
Among the Believers, pp. 141–142

An interesting cultural adaptation found mainly here, though, is the widespread claim of descent from the Arab (or Moghul) conquerors:

"Islam doesn't show on my face. We have nearly all, subcontinental Muslims, invented Arab ancestors for ourselves. Most of us are sayeds, descendants of Mohammed through his daughter Fatima and cousin and son-in-law Ali... Everybody has got an ancestor who came from Arabia or Central Asia."
Beyond Belief, p. 307

The last Nawab of Bahawalpur was fanatical about the ancestry he claimed. In Bahawalpur and Pakistan and the subcontinent he was an Arab of the Abassids and a conqueror, a man drawing his wealth from the country, but not part of it. He wore the fez to make the point.
Beyond Belief, p. 331

The psychic relation of "converted" (i.e. non-Arab) Muslims to Islam is the subject of V. S. Naipaul's literary travelogues Among the Believers and Beyond Belief: Islamic Excursions among the Converted Peoples.

== See also ==
- Ghazw
- Islamic conquest of Iran
- Islamic conquest of Afghanistan
- Islamic conquest of Egypt
- Shu'ūbiyya
- Jahiliyyah
