= Gerd R. Puin =

German orientalist and palaeographer (born 1940)

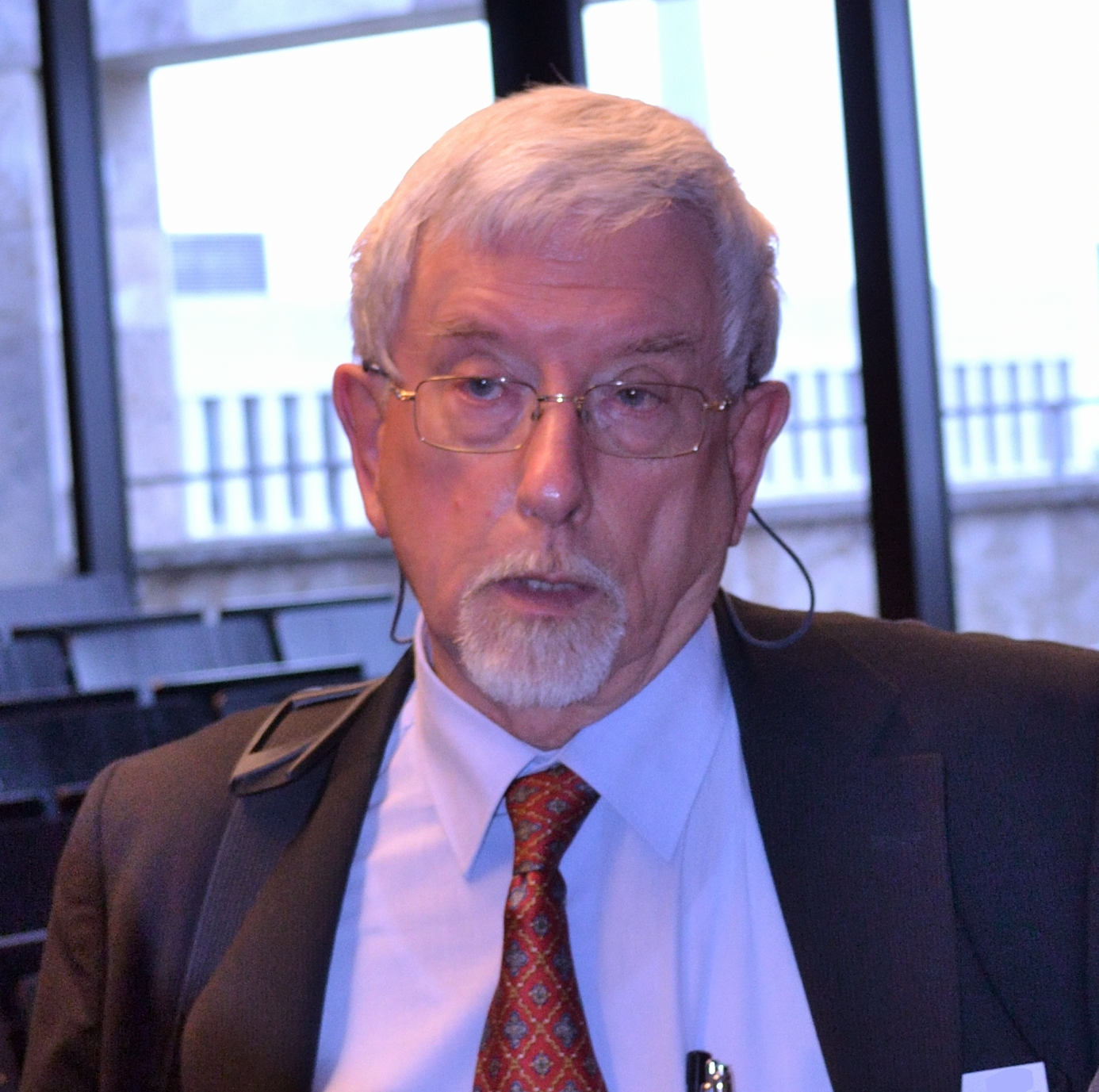
Puin in 2014

Gerd Rüdiger Puin (born 1940) is a German scholar of Oriental studies, specializing in Quranic palaeography, Arabic calligraphy and orthography. He was a lecturer of Arabic language and literature at Saarland University in Saarbrücken, Germany. In regards to his approach of historical research, Puin is considered a representative of the "Saarbrücken School", which is part of the Revisionist School of Islamic Studies.

== Discovery of the Sanaa manuscript ==
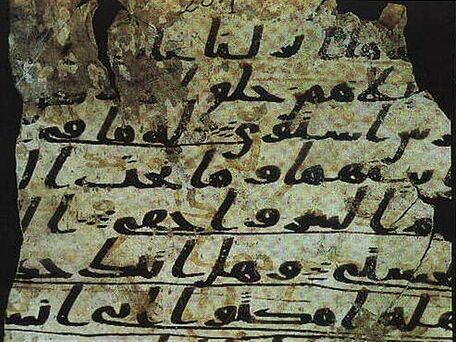
Gerd R. Puin's photograph of one of the parchments preserved in the Sanaa manuscript

Gerd R. Puin was the head of a restoration project commissioned by the Yemeni government, which spent a significant amount of time examining the ancient Quranic manuscripts discovered in the Great Mosque of Sanaa, Yemen in 1972, in order to find criteria for systematically cataloging them. According to journalist Toby Lester, his examination revealed "unconventional verse orderings, minor textual variations, and rare styles of orthography and artistic embellishment."

These scriptures were written in the early Hijazi Arabic script, matching the pieces of the earliest Quranic manuscripts known to exist. Some of the papyrus on which the text appears shows clear signs of earlier use, being that previous, washed-off writings are also visible on it. In 2008 and 2009, Elisabeth Puin published detailed results of the analysis of "Sanaa manuscript DAM" (dar al-makhtutat) 01.27-1, proving that the text was still in flux in the time span between the scriptio inferior and the scriptio superior of the palimpsest.

More than 15,000 sheets of the Yemeni Quranic manuscripts have painstakingly been cleaned, treated, sorted, cataloged and photographed and 35,000 microfilmed photos have been made of the manuscripts. Some of Puin's initial remarks on his findings are found in his essay titled the "Observations on Early Qur'an Manuscripts in Sana'a", which has been republished in the book What the Koran Really Says (2002), written by the Ex-Muslim author and activist Ibn Warraq. In January 2021, an interview with Puin regarding the discovery of the Sanaa manuscript was conducted by Robert M. Kerr, secretary of the INÂRAH Institute for Research on Early Islamic History and the Koran.

== Assessment of the Quran ==
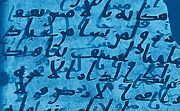
Page from the Sanaa manuscript. The "subtexts" revealed using UV light are very different from today's standard edition of the Quran. The German scholar of Quranic palaeography Gerd R. Puin affirms that these textual variants indicate an evolving text. A similar view has been expressed by the British historian of Near Eastern studies Lawrence Conrad regarding the early biographies of Muhammad; according to him, Islamic views on the birth date of Muhammad until the 8 century CE had a diversity of 85 years span.

In a 1999 article published in the American magazine The Atlantic, Gerd R. Puin has been interviewed and quoted as saying that:

My idea is that the Koran is a kind of cocktail of texts that were not all understood even at the time of Muhammad. Many of them may even be a hundred years older than Islam itself. Even within the Islamic traditions there is a huge body of contradictory information, including a significant Christian substrate; one can derive a whole Islamic anti-history from them if one wants.

The Koran claims for itself that it is 'mubeen,' or 'clear,' but if you look at it, you will notice that every fifth sentence or so simply doesn't make sense. Many Muslims—and Orientalists—will tell you otherwise, of course, but the fact is that a fifth of the Koranic text is just incomprehensible. This is what has caused the traditional anxiety regarding translation. If the Koran is not comprehensible—if it can't even be understood in Arabic—then it's not translatable. People fear that. And since the Koran claims repeatedly to be clear but obviously is not—as even speakers of Arabic will tell you—there is a contradiction. Something else must be going on.

== Works ==
- Ohlig, Karl-Heinz; Puin, Gerd-Rüdiger (2007). Die dunklen Anfänge. Neue Forschungen zur Entstehung und frühen Geschichte des Islam [The obscure beginnings: new research on the origin and early history of Islam] (in German) (3rd ed.). Berlin: Verlag Hans Schiler. ISBN 978-3-89930-128-1. LCCN 2006374620. OCLC 173644215.
- Ohlig, Karl-Heinz; Puin, Gerd-Rüdiger (2009). The hidden origins of Islam : new research into its early history (1st ed.). Amherst, NY: Prometheus Books. ISBN 978-1-59102-634-1. LCCN 2008049316. OCLC 179808111. Archived from the original on 10 May 2012.
- Hans-Caspar Graf von Bothmer; Karl-Heinz Ohlig; Gerd-Rüdiger Puin (1999). "Über die Bedeutung der ältesten Koranfragmente aus Sanaa (Jemen) für die Orthographiegeschichte des Korans. In: Neue Wege der Koranforschung" [On the meaning of the oldest Quran fragments from Sana'a (Yemen) on the orthographic history of the Quran. In: New Ways in Quran Research] (PDF). Magazin Forschung. 1999 (1). Saarland University: 37–40. ISSN 0937-7301. Archived from the original (PDF, 0.4 MB) on 23 December 2012.

== See also ==
- Patricia Crone
- History of the Quran
- Christoph Luxenberg
- Sana'a manuscript
- John Wansbrough
