= Andrew Rippin =

Canadian historian (1950–2016)

Andrew Lawrence Rippin, FRSC (16 May 1950 in London, England – 29 November 2016) was a Canadian scholar of Islamic studies and Quranic studies.

== Biography ==
Rippin was Professor of History and Dean of the Faculty of Humanities at the University of Victoria, British Columbia, Canada. His major academic fields were the history of the formative period of Islam and the interpretation of the Qurʾān in the classical period of Islam. He was the author of many works on Qur'anic Studies as well as the widely respected Muslims - Their Religious Beliefs and Practices, now in its fourth edition (2012). In 2006, he was made a Fellow of the Royal Society of Canada. Some of the works of Andrew Rippin are linked to the research on Ibadism.

He died on 29 November 2016 in Victoria, British Columbia at the age of 66.

== Works ==
- Andrew Rippin, Jan Knappert (eds.), Textual Sources for the Study of Islam, Totowa, N.J. : Barnes & Noble, 1987.
- Andrew Rippin (ed.), Approaches to the History of the Interpretation of the Qur'an, Oxford : Clarendon Press, 1988.
- Andrew Rippin, Muslims: Their Religious Beliefs and Practices, New York : Routledge, 1990.
- Andrew Rippin (ed.), The Qur'an: Formative Interpretation, Aldershot: Ashgate, 1999.
- Andrew Rippin (ed.), The Qur'an, Style and Contents, Aldershot: Ashgate, 2001.
- Andrew Rippin, The Qur'an and its Interpretative Tradition, (Variorum Collected Studies), Aldershot, Hampshire; Burlington, VT: Ashgate/Variorum, 2001.
- Norman Calder, Jawid Mojaddedi, Andrew Rippin (eds.), Classical Islam: A Sourcebook of Religious Literature, New York : Routledge, 2003.
- Andrew Rippin, Muslims: Their Religious Beliefs and Practices. 2005.
- Andrew Rippin (ed.), Defining Islam: A Reader, London; Oakville, CT: Equinox, 2007.
- Andrew Rippin (ed.), The Islamic world, New York: Routledge, 2010.
- Andrew Rippin, Jawid Mojaddedi (eds.), The Wiley Blackwell Companion to the Qur'an, Chichester, W. Sussex: John Wiley & Sons, Inc., 2017.
