= Crossroads to Islam =

Book by Yehuda D. Nevo

Crossroads to Islam : the origins of the Arab religion and the Arab state
- Author: Yehuda D. Nevo and Judith Koren
- Language: English
- Genre: Current affairs
- Publisher: Prometheus Books
- Publication date: 2003
- Publication place: United States of America
- Media type: Book
- Pages: 462
- ISBN: 1-59102-083-2
- OCLC: 94948942
- Dewey Decimal: 297/.09/021
- LC Class: BP55 .N48 2003

Crossroads to Islam: The Origins of the Arab Religion and the Arab State is a book by archaeologist Yehuda D. Nevo and researcher Judith Koren. The book presents a radical theory of the origins and development of the Islamic state and religion based on archeological, epigraphical and historiographical research.

== Methodology ==
Using a historical methodology the authors examined not only Muslim literature but hitherto neglected sources datable to before the 9th century such as archaeological excavations, numismatics, rock inscriptions and the records of the local non-Muslim populations.

They provide a large selection of inscriptions until now overlooked and uncited in the traditional histories, which for the most part are datable to the 7th and 8th centuries, and use them to trace an historical narrative considerably different from the traditional accounts.

== Thesis ==
From the archeological evidence and the lack thereof from the 7th century and Islamic period, the authors cast doubt onto the veracity of the traditional accounts of early Islamic origins that are still cited as fact in most history books. Notably, the archeological, epigraphical and historiographical evidence provides, according to the authors a view of the Middle East of the 7th and 8th century that lacks the preeminence of any "prophet" or the existence of a religion that would later come to be known as Islam.

Based on the evidence that is presented in the book the authors conclude that

- Traditional Islamic narratives of the 7th and 8th century are a complete construct and cannot stand up to historical examination on the basis of archeological and epigraphical evidence and non-Muslim records. (For example, early Christian sources do not mention the "rightly guided caliphs" nor any of the famous futūḥ battles—the early Arab-Muslim conquests which facilitated the spread of Islam and Islamic civilization—and that coins of the region and era used Byzantine—not Islamic—iconography until the reign of Abd al-Malik ibn Marwan (686-705 CE).)
- The Arabs were in fact pagan when they assumed power in the 7th century in the regions formerly ruled by the Byzantine Empire.
- There was no Arab conquest of eastern Byzantine provinces. Byzantium had effectively withdrawn from the area long before, and placed Arab tribes as "clients" (foederati) in their stead. Arabs eventually took control almost without a struggle.
- Muawiyah I (traditionally described as the first Umayyad Caliph), was the first historical ruler of the Arab Empire, and arose as a warlord/strongman from the other foederati.
- After taking control, the Arabs adopted a simple monotheism based on Judaeo-Christianity, which they encountered in their newly occupied territories, and gradually developed it into an Arab religion which culminated in Islam in the mid-8th century.
- The Quran was not fully codified until the Abbasid era when the development of a legal code (Sharia) distinct from the Byzantine code used by the Umayyad. The Sharia needed a formalized scripture to claim that the code was derived from through exegesis and so "prophetical logia" was canonized as the Word of God.

The author's evidence and conclusions are similar to the work of other scholars such as Fred Donner's historiographical work, John Wansbrough or Patricia Crone and Michael Cook's book Hagarism who on different grounds propose that Islam and the Qu'ran were not the work of Muhammad.

== Reception ==
A review in the Middle East Quarterly by David Cook notes that the book covers new ground not addressed by previous works, as the authors delve into areas of archeology and epigraphy to support their thesis. Cooks finds that the book "employs a very rigorous, historical methodology", and the results to be "plausible or at least arguable".

On the other hand, Colin Wells, writing for the Bryn Mawr Classical Review, writes "like Holocaust deniers the authors don't merely question some aspects of the consensus view, they reject it wholesale". Wells critiques the authors for taking skepticism of early Islam too far, noting that while there are other works that question the historicity of early Islam, the "authors are unusual only in rejecting the traditional version outright, not in interrogating it".

== See also ==
- The Quest for the Historical Muhammad
- Narratives of Islamic Origins: The Beginnings of Islamic Historical Writing

== Bibliography ==
- Nevo, Yehuda D.; Koren, Judith (2003). Crossroads to Islam : the origins of the Arab religion and the Arab state. Prometheus Books.
- Reynolds, Gabriel Said (2008). "Introduction, Quranic studies and its controversies". In Reynolds, Gabriel Said (ed.). The Quran in its Historical Context. Routledge.
