= Historicity of Muhammad =

Historical study of the Islamic prophet

The historicity of Muhammad is the subject of the study of Muhammad as a historical figure and critical examination of sources upon which traditional accounts (the Quran, sīrah, hadith especially) are based. Other historical sources that can be investigated include sealed documents, orders, treaty texts, archaeological findings and internal and external correspondence of neighboring states or communities, as well as the discovery of Muhammad's genetic makeup and kinship through his personal belongings and physical remains (hair, beard, etc.) that are among his legacies.

Prophetic biography, known as sīra, along with attributed records of the words, actions, and the silent approval of Muhammad, known as hadith, survive in the historical works of writers from the second and third centuries of the Muslim era (c. 700−1000 CE), and give a great deal of information on Muhammad, but the reliability of this information is very much debated in academic circles (hadith studies) due to the gap (oral tradition) between the recorded dates of Muhammad's life and the dates when these events begin to appear in written sources. Islamic tradition traces the lineage of the Islamic prophet Muhammad back to the Adnani branch of the Arabs, through the Hashim family and the Quraysh tribe. (Note: Wathilah ibn al-Asqa narrated that Muhammad said "Indeed Allah chose Isma'il from the progeny of Ibrahim, chose the Banu Kinanah over other tribes from the children of Isma'il; He chose the Banu Quraish over other tribes of Kinanah; He chose Banu Hashim over the other families of the Quraish; and He chose me from Banu Hashim.") And, Muhammad is believed to be descended from Ishmael, the son of Abraham, through the Hashim tribe who are considered prophets in Islam, a biblical figure; however, neither Abraham nor Ishmael's existence has been independently corroborated by historians. Modern historians don't take the Family tree as a fact. In the pre-Islamic (and early Islamic) period, genealogical trees were a product of the oral tradition of the Days of the Arabs, shaped according to social needs and the interests of the listeners. Contemporary historiography unveiled the lack of inner coherence of this genealogical system and demonstrated that it finds insufficient matching evidence; the distinction between Qahtanites and Adnanites is believed to be a product of the Umayyad Age, when the war of factions (al-niza al-hizbi) was raging in the young Islamic Empire.

The Islamic view is that the Quran has been preserved from the beginning by both writing and memorization, and its testimony is considered beyond doubt. The earliest Muslim source of information for the life of Muhammad, the Quran, gives very little personal information and its historicity is debated.

Despite any difficulties with the biographical sources, scholars generally see valuable historical information about Muhammad therein and suggest that what is needed are methods to distinguish the likely information from the unlikely. In practice it has proven difficult determining which parts of the early accounts of Muhammad's life are valuable to modern scholars. However, the vast majority of classical scholars believe Muhammad's life is accurately described by Islamic sources.

The existence of Muhammad is supported by non-Islamic sources attesting to his existence as early as a decade after his death.

== Geography ==
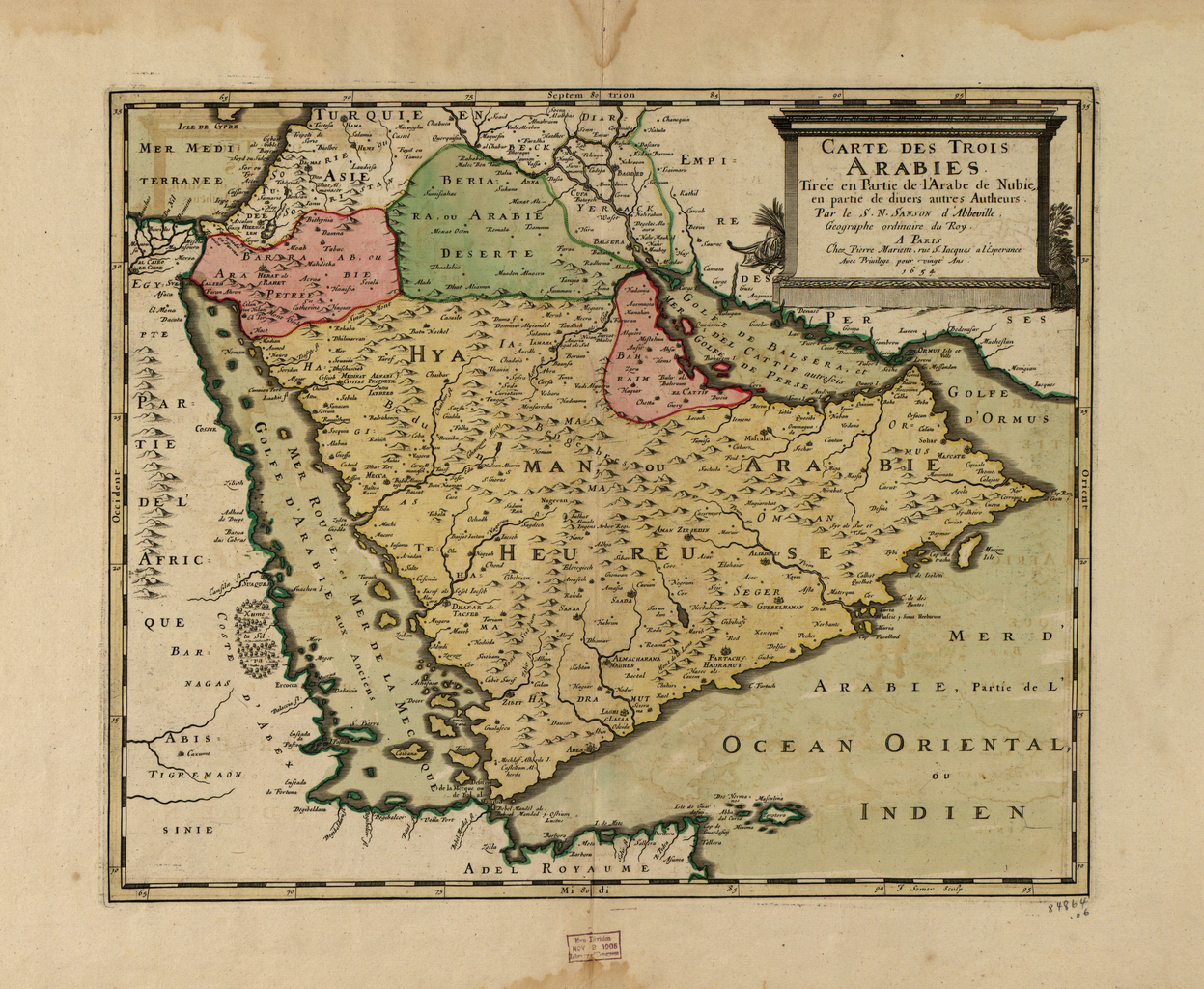
Non-Islamic testimonies about Muhammad's life describe him as the leader of the Saracens, believed to be descendants of Ishmael, lived in the regions Arabia Petrae and Arabia Deserta in the north. According to some sources, Muhammad is not a name but a title.

There are a relatively small number of contemporaneous or near-contemporaneous non-Muslim sources which attest to the existence of Muhammad and are valuable both in themselves and for comparison with Muslim sources. As in the case of Mecca, these sources cannot be said to support the traditional Islamic narrative; where there is a lack of pre-Islamic sources that mention it as a pilgrimage center in historical sources before 741 here the author places the region in "midway between Ur and Harran" rather than the Hejaz- and lacks pre-Islamic archaeological data. (Note: The first references to Mecca do not use locative expressions except for the Byzantine-Arab Chronicle or Chronicle of 741, though here the author places the region in Mesopotamia ("midway between Ur and Harran") rather than the Hejaz.)

=== Modern scholarship on Mecca ===
Little is known about the early history of Mecca due to a lack of clear sources. The city lies in the hinterland of the middle part of western Arabia of which there are sparse textual or archaeological sources available. This lack of knowledge is in contrast to both the northern and southern areas of western Arabia, specifically the Syro-Palestinian frontier and Yemen, where historians have various sources available such as physical remains of shrines, inscriptions, observations by Greco-Roman authors, and information collected by church historians. The area of Hejaz that surrounds Mecca was characterized by its remote, rocky, and inhospitable nature, supporting only meagre settled populations in scattered oases and occasional stretches of fertile land. The Red Sea coast offered no easily accessible ports and the oasis dwellers and the Bedouins of the region were illiterate.

Possible earlier mentions are not unambiguous. The Greek historian Diodorus Siculus writes about Arabia in the 1st century BCE in his work Bibliotheca historica, describing a holy shrine: "And a temple has been set up there, which is very holy and exceedingly revered by all Arabians". Claims have been made this could be a reference to the Ka'bah in Mecca. However, the geographic location Diodorus describes is located in northwest Arabia, around the area of Leuke Kome, within the former Nabataean Kingdom and the Roman province of Arabia Petraea.

Ptolemy lists the names of 50 cities in Arabia, one going by the name of Macoraba. There has been speculation since 1646 that this could be a reference to Mecca. Historically, there has been a general consensus in scholarship that Macoraba mentioned by Ptolemy in the 2nd century CE is indeed Mecca, but more recently, this has been questioned. Bowersock favors the identity of the former, with his theory being that "Macoraba" is the word "Makkah" followed by the aggrandizing Aramaic adjective rabb (great). The Roman 4th-century historian Ammianus Marcellinus also enumerated many cities of Western Arabia, most of which can be identified. According to Bowersock, he did mention Mecca as "Geapolis" or "Hierapolis", the latter one meaning "holy city" potentially referring to the sanctuary of the Kaaba.

Procopius' 6th century statement that the Ma'add tribe possessed the coast of western Arabia between the Ghassanids and the Himyarites of the south supports the Arabic sources tradition that associates Quraysh as a branch of the Ma'add and Muhammad as a direct descendant of Ma'add ibn Adnan.

== Islamic sources ==
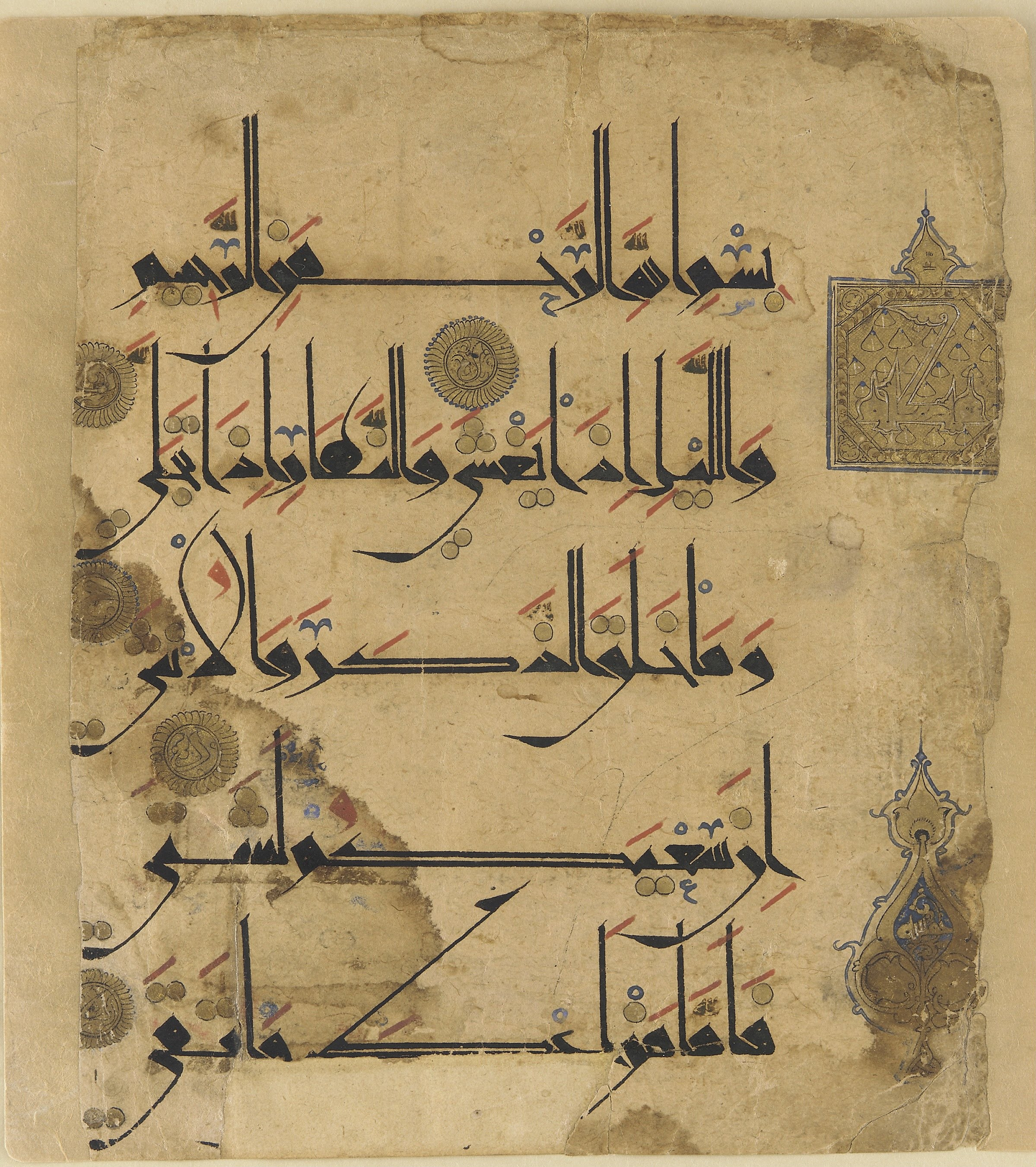
11th-century Persian Quran folio page in kufic script

The main Islamic source on Muhammad's life are the Quran and accounts of Muhammad's life based on oral traditions known as sīra and hadith.

=== Historicity of the Quran ===
==== Islamic narrative ====
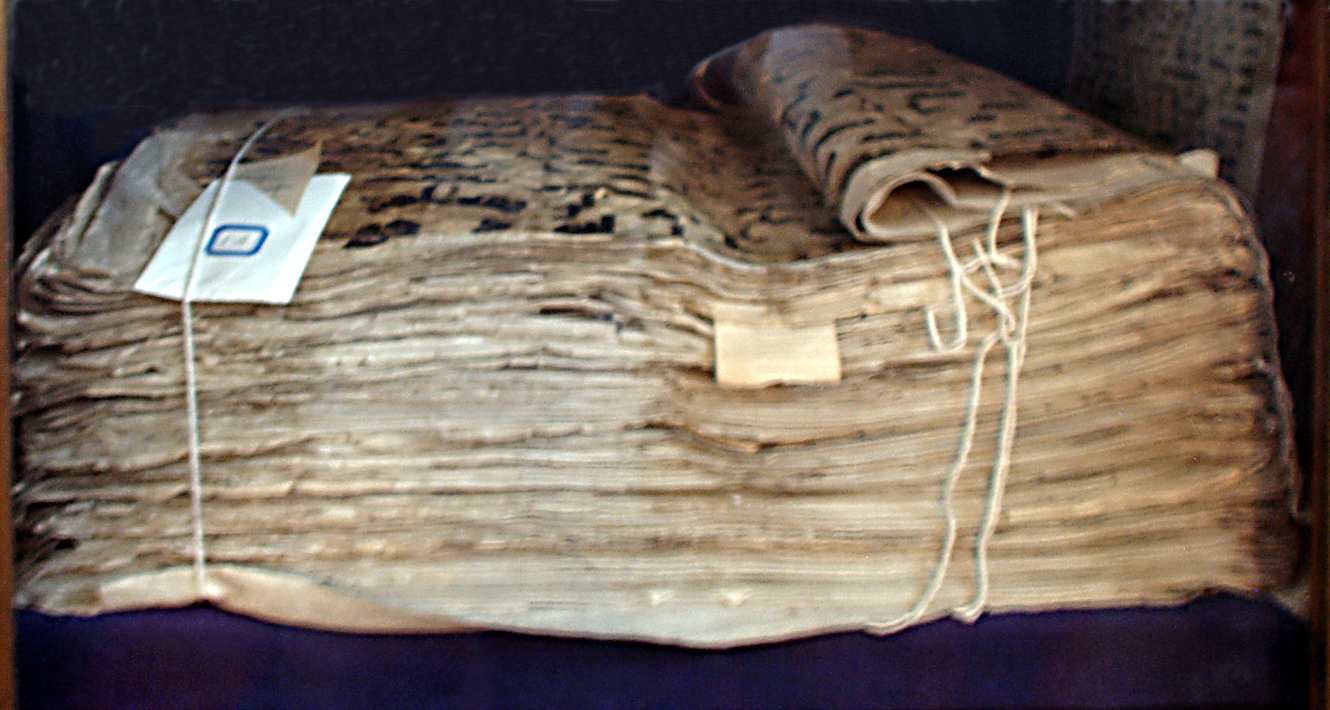
The Samarkand Kufic Quran, dated to the early 9th century. It is alleged to be a 7th-century original of the edition of the third caliph, Uthman. It is located in the small Telyashayakh mosque in Tashkent.

According to traditional Islamic scholarship, all of the Quran was written down by Muhammad's companions while he was alive (during CE 610–632), but it was primarily an orally related document. Following the death of Muhammad the Quran ceased to be revealed, and companions who had memorized the Quran began to die off (particularly after the Battle of Yamama in 633). Worried that parts of the Quran might be irretrievably lost, senior companion Umar urged Caliph Abu Bakr to order the collection of the pieces of the Quran which had hitherto been scattered among "palm-leaf stalks, thin white stones, ... [and] men who knew it by heart, ..." and put them together. Under Caliph Uthman, a committee of five copied the scraps into a single volume, "monitoring the text as they went", resolving disagreements about verses, tracking down a lost verse. This muṣḥaf – that became known as the "Uthmanic codex" – was finished around 650 CE, whereupon Uthman issued an order for all other existing personal and individual copies and dialects of the Quran (known as Ahruf) to be burnt.

==== Modern scholarship on the Quran ====
As to the historicity of the Quran itself, some scholars also disagree. Some argue "the Quran is convincingly the words of Muhammad" (F.E. Peters), with the parchment of an early copy of Quran – the Birmingham manuscript, whose text differs only slightly to modern versions – being dated to roughly around the lifetime of Muhammad. Some Western scholars, however, question the accuracy of some of the Quran's historical accounts and whether the holy book existed in any form before the last decade of the seventh century (Patricia Crone and Michael Cook); and/or argue it is a "cocktail of texts", some of which may have been existent a hundred years before Muhammad, that evolved (Gerd R. Puin), or was redacted (J. Wansbrough), to form the Quran. A group of researchers explores the irregularities and repetitions in the Quranic text in a way that refutes the traditional claim that it was preserved by memorization alongside writing. According to them, an oral period shaped the Quran as a text and order, and the repetitions and irregularities mentioned were remnants of this period.

It is also possible that the content of the Quran itself may provide data regarding the date and probably nearby geography of writing of the text. Sources based on some archaeological data give the construction date of Masjid al-Haram, an architectural work mentioned 16 times in the Quran, as 78 AH an additional finding that sheds light on the evolutionary history of the Quranic texts mentioned, which is known to continue even during the time of Hajjaj, in a similar situation that can be seen with al-Aksa, though different suggestions have been put forward to explain. (Note: Arabic and Persian writers such as 10th-century geographer al-Muqaddasi, 11th-century scholar Nasir Khusraw, 12th-century geographer al-Idrisi and 15th-century Islamic scholar Mujir al-Din, as well as 19th-century North American and British Orientalist scholars such as Edward Robinson, Guy Le Strange, and Edward Henry Palmer explained that the term Masjid al-Aqsa refers to the entire esplanade plaza also known as the Temple Mount or Haram al-Sharif ('Noble Sanctuary')—i.e., the entire area including the Dome of the Rock, the fountains, the gates, and the four minarets—because none of these buildings existed at the time when the Quran was written.) These structures, -expected to be somewhere near Muhammad- (Note: While "masjid" may simply be used as a place of worship, meaning a place of prostration traditionally used for worship, it may also refer to the buildings where these acts took place. In this case, the relevant verses could be dated after the construction of these buildings. Another verse alluding to Muhammad's Miraj story can be used to conclude that these two mosques are not that far apart. In this regard, one can consider the conclusions of scholars who point to Al-Aqsa being near Mecca —in the Al-Ji'rana region— or, conversely, the Revisionist school of Islamic studies, which suggests that the birth of Islam occurred in northwestern Arabia.) which were placed in cities like Mecca and Jerusalem, which are thousands of kilometers apart today, with interpretations based on narrations and miracles, were only a night walk away according to the outward and literal meaning of the verse.Surah Al-Isra 17:1

===== Muhammad in the Quran =====
The Quran primarily addresses a single "Messenger of God," Muhammad. Unlike the hundreds of references in the Quran to the stories of prophets such as Moses and Jesus, the Quran provides very little information about Muhammad himself, his companions, or his contemporaries. The individuals to whom the expressions used in Quranic polemics belong and the contexts in which they were used are merely notes made in commentaries written in later centuries. An exception is his slave/adopted son Zayd, whose name is mentioned in the verses (Al-Aḥzāb;37) in the context of his -divorced- wife being taken into Muhammad's marriages.

Probably the clearest biographical account of Muhammad in the Quran is the brief mention of his followers' settlement in Yathrib after their expulsion by the Quraysh, and of military encounters such as the Muslim victory at Badr.

Modern scholars differ in their assessment of the Quran as a historical source about Muhammad's life. According to the Encyclopedia of Islam, the "Qur'an responds constantly and often candidly to Muhammad's changing historical circumstances and contains a wealth of hidden data that are relevant to the task of the quest for the historical Muhammad." In contrast, Solomon A. Nigosian writes that the Quran tells us very little about the life of Muhammad. Unlike the Bible's narratives of the life of Moses or Jesus, Michael Cook notes that

while the Koran tells many stories after its fashion, that of Muhammad is not among them. There are references to events in his life, but they are only references, not narratives. In addition, the book is not given to mentioning names in the context of its own time. Muhammad himself is named four times, and a couple of his contemporaries once each ... and for this reason it is almost impossible to relate the scripture to his life without going outside it.

=== Traditions ===
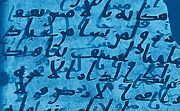
Manuscripts found in Sana'a. The "subtexts" revealed using UV light are very different from today's Qur'an. Gerd R. Puin believed this to mean an evolving text. A similar phrase is used by Lawrence Conrad for biography of Muhammad. Because, according to his studies, Islamic scientific view on the date of birth of the Prophet until the second century A.H. had exhibited a diversity of 85 years.

Unlike the Quran, the hadith and sīra are devoted to Muhammad, his life, his words, deeds, approval, and example to Muslims in general.

==== Prophetic biography (sīra) ====
Much is believed to be known about Muhammad from Sira literature:

The life of Muhammad is known as the Sira and was lived in the full light of history. Everything he did and said was recorded. Because he could not read and write himself, he was constantly served by a group of 45 scribes who wrote down his sayings, instructions, and his activities. Muhammad himself insisted on documenting his important decisions. Nearly three hundred of his documents have come down to us, including political treaties, military enlistments, assignments of officials, and state correspondence written on tanned leather. We thus know his life to the minutest details: how he spoke, sat, slept (sic), dressed, walked; his behavior as a husband, father, nephew; his attitudes toward women, children, animals; his business transactions and stance toward the poor and the oppressed ...

In the sīra literature, the most important extant biography are the two recensions of Ibn Ishaq's (d. 768), now known as Sīrat Rasūl Allah ("Biography/Life of the Messenger/Apostle of Allah"), which survive in the works of his editors, most notably Ibn Hisham (d. 834) and Yunus b. Bukayr (d.814–815), although not in its original form. According to Ibn Hisham, Ibn Ishaq wrote his biography some 120 to 130 years after Muhammad's death. Many, but not all, scholars accept the accuracy of these biographies, though their accuracy is unascertainable.

After Ibn Ishaq, there are a number of shorter accounts (some of which are earlier than Ibn Ishaq) recorded in different forms (see List of earliest writers of sīra). Other biographies of Muhammad include al-Waqidi's (d. 822) and then Ibn Sa'd's (d.844–45). Al-Waqidi is often criticized by early Muslim historians who state that the author is unreliable. These are not "biographies" in the modern sense of the word, but rather accounts of Muhammad's military expeditions, his sayings, the reasons for and interpretations of verses in the Quran.

==== Criticism of sīra ====
Secular historians have been much more critical of Sīra. Tom Holland notes that Ibn Hisham credits angels with helping Muslims to victory at the Battle of Badr, and wonders why he should be considered a reliable historical source any more than Homer (who portrayed gods as influencing battles in his epic poem the Iliad).

Henri Lammens complains of contradictions in the Traditions about Muhammad's life, including on the number of his children and wives. Some accounts have him having one child, others two, and still another claimed he had twelve children, including eight boys. (Note: At least many contemporary sources state that Muhammad had three sons, or only two.) While most accounts state he had nine wives, "some passages of the sira speak of twenty three wives." Muhammad is thought to have lived between 60 and 65 years according to tradition.

According to Wim Raven, it is often noted that a coherent image of Muhammad cannot be formed from the literature of sīra, whose authenticity and factual value have been questioned on a number of different grounds. He lists the following arguments against the authenticity of sīra, followed here by counter-arguments:

1. Hardly any sīra work was compiled during the first century of Islam. Fred Donner points out that the earliest historical writings about the origins of Islam first emerged in 60-70 AH, well within the first century of Hijra (see also List of biographies of Muhammad). Furthermore, the sources now extant, dating from the second, third, and fourth centuries AH, are according to Donner mostly compilations of material derived from earlier sources.
2. The many discrepancies exhibited in different narrations found in sīra works. Yet, despite the lack of a single orthodoxy in Islam, there is still a marked agreement on the most general features of the traditional origins story.
3. Later sources claiming to know more about the time of Muhammad than earlier ones (to add embellishments and exaggeration common to an oral storytelling tradition).
4. Discrepancies compared to non-Muslim sources. But there are also similarities and agreements both in information specific to Muhammad, and concerning Muslim tradition at large.
5. Some parts or genres of sīra, namely those dealing with miracles, are not fit as sources for scientific historiographical information about Muhammad, except for showing the beliefs and doctrines of his community.

Nevertheless, other content of sīra, like the Constitution of Medina, is generally considered to be authentic by both Muslim and non-Muslim historians.

==== Hadith ====
The hadith collections include traditional, hagiographic accounts of verbal and physical traditions attributed to Muhammad, and for many, often explain what a verse in the Quran is referring to in regards to Muhammad. Unlike every verse of the Quran, not all hadiths are universally accepted by Muslims.

Early Muslim scholars were concerned that some hadiths (and sīra reports) were fabricated, and thus they developed a science of hadith criticism (see Hadith studies) to distinguish between genuine sayings and those that were forged, recorded using different words, or were wrongly ascribed to Muhammad.

Certain western academics view the hadith collections with considerable caution. Bernard Lewis states that "The collection and recording of Hadith did not take place until several generations after the death of the Prophet. During that period the opportunities and motives for falsification were almost unlimited." In addition to fabrication, the meaning of a hadith may have substantially drifted from its original telling by the time it was written down.

The main feature of hadith is that of Isnad (chains of transmission), which are the basis of determining the authenticity of the reports in traditional Islamic scholarship. According to Stephen Humphreys, while a number of "very capable" modern scholars defended the general authenticity of isnads, most modern scholars regard isnads with "deep suspicion", due to the potential for isnads, like hadith, to be fabricated.

Jonathan A. C. Brown, a Sunni Muslim American scholar of Islamic studies who follows the Hanbali school of jurisprudence, asserts that the hadith tradition is a "common sense science" or a "common sense tradition" and is "one of the biggest accomplishments in human intellectual history ... in its breadth, in its depth, in its complexity and in its internal consistency."

== Non-Muslim sources ==
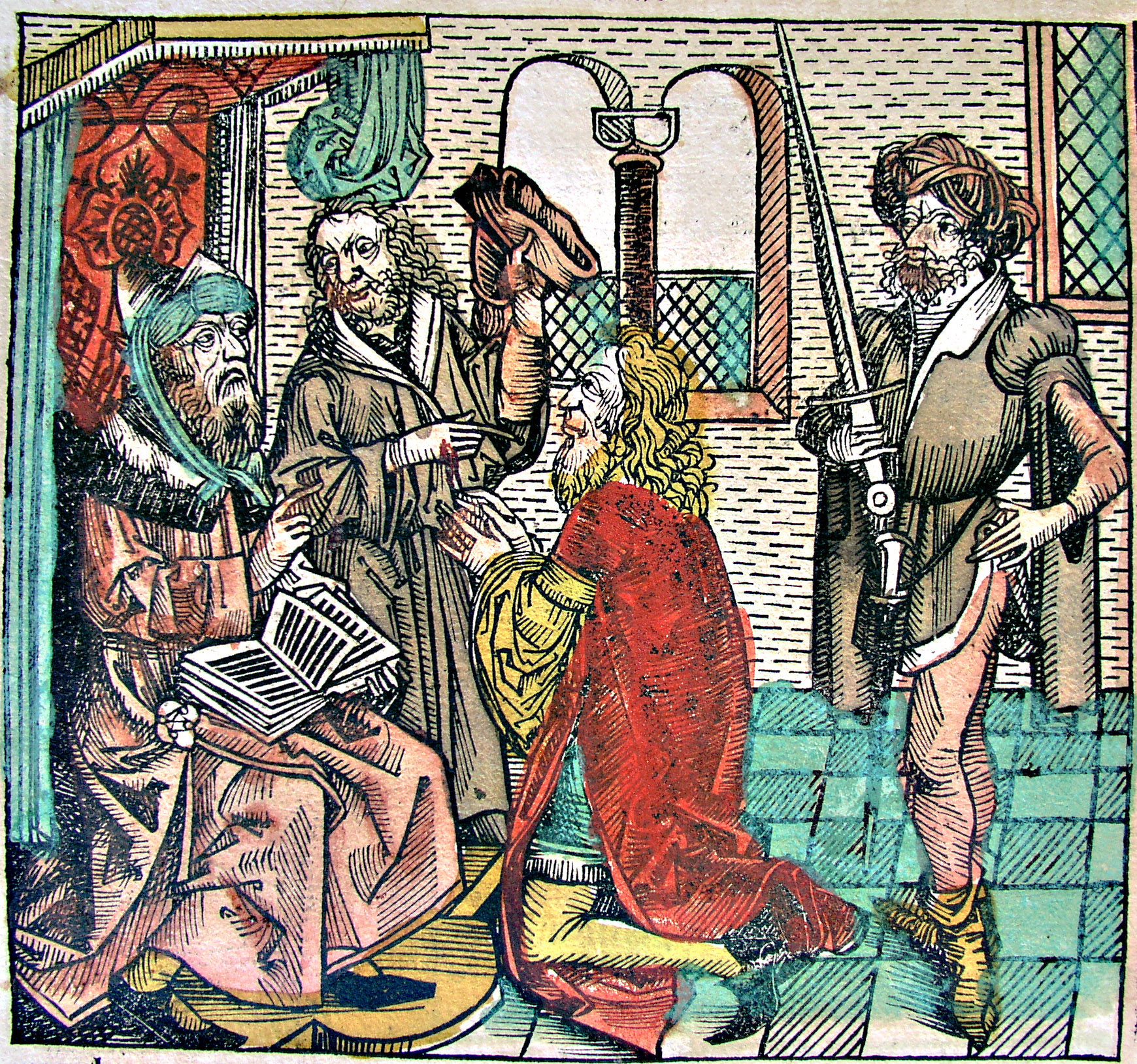
Muhammad in the Nuremberg Chronicle, late 15th century

Early Islamic history is also reflected in sources written in Greek, Syriac, Armenian, and Hebrew by Jewish and Christian communities, all of which are dated after 633 CE. According to Nevo and Koren, no Byzantine or Syriac sources provide any detail on "Muhammad's early career [...] which predate the Muslim literature on the subject".

According to Syriac and Byzantine sources studied by historian S.P. Brock, "The title 'prophet' [applied to Muhammad] is not very common, 'apostle' even less so. Normally he is simply described as the first of the Arab kings, and it would be generally true to say that the Syriac sources of this period see the conquests primarily as Arab, and not Muslim".

There is a reference recording the Arab conquest of Syria (known as Fragment on the Arab Conquests), that mentions Muhammad. This very faded note is preserved on folio 1 of BL Add. 14,461, a codex containing the Gospel of Matthew and the Gospel of Mark. This note appears to have been penned soon after the battle of Gabitha (636 CE) at which the Arabs effected a crushing defeat of the Byzantines. Wright was first to draw the attention to the fragment and suggested that "it seems to be a nearly contemporary notice", a view which was also endorsed by Nöldeke. The purpose of jotting this note in the book of Gospels appears to be commemorative as the author appears to have realized how momentous the events of his time were. The words "we saw" are positive evidence that the author was a contemporary. The author also talks about olive oil, cattle, ruined villages, suggesting that he belonged to peasant stock, i.e., parish priest or a monk who could read and write. It is worthwhile cautioning that the condition of the text is fragmentary and many of the readings unclear or disputable. The lacunae (gaps in the text) are supplied in square brackets:

... and in January, they took the word for their lives (did) [the sons of] Emesa [i.e., ̣Hiṃs)], and many villages were ruined with killing by [the Arabs of] Muḥammad and a great number of people were killed and captives [were taken] from Galilee as far as Bēth [...] and those Arabs pitched camp beside [Damascus?] [...] and we saw everywhe[re...] and o[l]ive oil which they brought and them. And on the t[wenty six]th of May went S[ac[ella]rius]... cattle [...] [...] from the vicinity of Emesa and the Romans chased them [...] and on the tenth [of August] the Romans fled from the vicinity of Damascus [...] many [people] some 10,000. And at the turn [of the ye]ar the Romans came; and on the twentieth of August in the year n[ine hundred and forty-]seven there gathered in Gabitha [...] the Romans and great many people were ki[lled of] [the R]omans, [s]ome fifty thousand [...]

The 7th-century Chronicle of 640 was published by Wright who first brought to attention the mention of an early date of 947 AG (635–36 CE). The contents of this manuscript has puzzled many scholars for their apparent lack of coherence as it contains an assembly of texts with diverse nature. In relation to Arabs of Mohammed, there are two important dates mentioned in this manuscript.

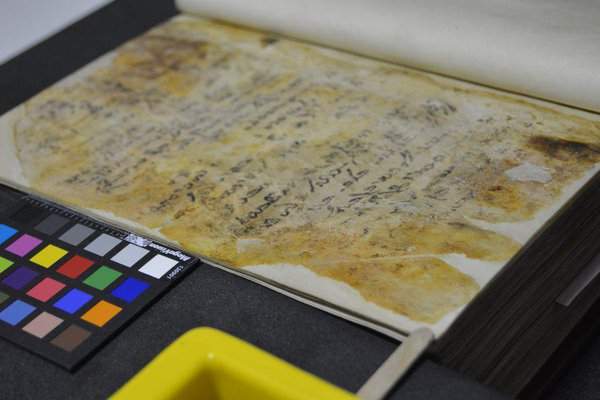
Fragment on Arab Conquest

AG 945, indiction VII: On Friday, 4 February, [i.e., 634 CE / Dhul Qa'dah 12 AH] at the ninth hour, there was a battle between the Romans and the Arabs of Maḥmet [Syriac tayyāyē d-MḤMT] in Palestine twelve miles east of Gaza. The Romans fled, leaving behind the patrician Jordan [Syriac BRYRDN], whom the Arabs killed. Some 40,000 [according to the original edition, but the more recent English translation reads "4000" without comment] poor villagers of Palestine were killed there, Christians, Jews and Samaritans. The Arabs ravaged the whole region.

AG 947, indiction IX: The Arabs invaded the whole of Syria and went down to Persia and conquered it; the Arabs climbed mountain of Mardin and killed many monks there in [the monasteries of] Qedar and Bnata (Benōthō). There died the blessed man Simon, doorkeeper of Qedar, brother of Thomas the priest.

It is the first date above which is of great importance as it provides the first explicit reference to Muhammad in a non-Muslim source. The account is usually identified with the battle of Dathin. According to Hoyland, "its precise dating inspires confidence that it ultimately derives from first-hand knowledge".

Another account of the early seventh century comes from Sebeos who was an Armenian bishop of the House of Bagratuni. His account indicates he was writing at a time when memories of sudden eruption of the Arabs were fresh. He knows Muhammad's name, that he was a merchant by profession, and hints that his life was suddenly changed by a divinely inspired revelation. Sebeos is the first non-Muslim author to present a theory for the rise of Islam that pays attention to what the Muslims themselves thought they were doing.

At that time a certain man from along those same sons of Ismael, whose name was Mahmet [i.e., Muḥammad], a merchant, as if by God's command appeared to them as a preacher [and] the path of truth. He taught them to recognize the God of Abraham, especially because he was learnt and informed in the history of Moses. Now because the command was from on high, at a single order they all came together in unity of religion. Abandoning their vain cults, they turned to the living God who had appeared to their father Abraham. So, Mahmet legislated for them: not to eat carrion, not to drink wine, not to speak falsely, and not to engage in fornication. He said: 'With an oath God promised this land to Abraham and his seed after him for ever. And he brought about as he promised during that time while he loved Israel. But now you are the sons of Abraham and God is accomplishing his promise to Abraham and his seed for you. Love sincerely only the God of Abraham, and go and seize the land which God gave to your father Abraham. No one will be able to resist you in battle, because God is with you.

From this chronicle, there are indications that he lived through many of the events he relates. He maintains that the account of Arab conquests derives from the fugitives who had been eyewitnesses thereof. He concludes with Mu'awiya's ascendancy in the Arab civil war (656–661 CE), which suggests that he was writing soon after this date.

== General considerations for historicity ==
Though the Quran contains few and rudimentary details of the prophet's life, most of the biographical information about Muhammad comes from the sirah (biographical literature), especially the work of Ibn Ishaq (d. 768). These sources normally provide a historical trail of names that lead, in some cases, to an eyewitness and sometimes converge with other earlier sources near the time of the prophet. Though "there is no compelling reason to suggest that the basic scaffolding of the traditional Islamic account of Muhammad's life is unhistorical", a much more detailed biography is difficult to be understood as historically certain knowledge. According to Wim Raven, attempts to distinguish between the historical elements and the unhistorical elements of many of the reports of Muhammad have been problematic. According to F. E. Peters, despite any difficulties with the biographical sources, scholars generally see valuable historical information about Muhammad therein and suggest that what is needed are methods to be able to sort out the likely from the unlikely.

In the 1970s, the Revisionist School of Islamic Studies raised fundamental doubts about the reliability of traditional Islamic sources and applied the historical-critical methods to the early Islamic period, including the veracity of the conventional account of Muhammad. A major source of difficulty in the quest for the historical Muhammad is the modern lack of knowledge about pre-Islamic Arabia. According to Harald Motzki, "On the one hand, it is not possible to write a historical biography of the Prophet without being accused of using the sources uncritically, while on the other hand, when using the sources critically, it is simply not possible to write such a biography."

In 1952, French Arabist Régis Blachère, author of a critical biography of Muhammad that took "fully into account the skeptical conclusions" of Ignác Goldziher and Henri Lammens, i.e. that Islamic hadith had been corrupted and could not be considered reliable sources of information, wrote

We no longer have any sources that would allow us to write a detailed history of Muhammad with a rigorous and continuous chronology. To resign oneself to a partial or total ignorance is necessary, above all for everything that concerns the period prior to Muhammad's divine call [ca. 610 CE]. All a truly scientific biography can achieve is to lay out the successive problems engendered by this preapostolate period, sketch out the general background atmosphere in which Muhammad received his divine call, give in broad brush strokes the development of his apostleship at Mecca, try with a greater chance of success to put in order the known facts, and finally put back into the penumbra all that remains uncertain. To want to go further is to fall into hagiography or romanticization.

Michael Cook laments that comparing Ibn Ishaq with the later commentator Al-Waqid—who based his writing on Ibn Ishaq but added much colorful but made-up detail—reveals how oral history can be contaminated by the fiction of storytellers (qussa). "We have seen what half a century of story-telling could achieve between Ibn Ishaq and al-Waqidi, at a time when we know that much material had already been committed to writing. What the same processes may have brought about in the century before Ibn Ishaq is something we can only guess at."

Overall, Cook takes the view that evidence independent of Islamic tradition "precludes any doubts as to whether Muhammad was a real person" and clearly shows that he became the central figure of a new religion in the decades following his death. He reports, though, that this evidence conflicts with the Islamic view in some aspects, associating Muhammad with Israel rather than Inner Arabia, complicating the question of his sole authorship or transmission of the Quran, and suggesting that there were Jews as well as Arabs among his followers.

Cook's fellow revisionist Patricia Crone complains that Sīrat is written "not by a grandchild, but a great grandchild of the Prophet's generation", that it is written from the point of view of the ulama and Abbasid, so that "we shall never know ... how the Umayyad caliphs remembered their prophet".

While Crone argues that Muhammad was a person whose existence is supported by various sources, she takes a view that Muhammad's traditional association with the Arabian Peninsula may be "doctrinally inspired", and is put in doubt by the Quran itself, which describes agricultural activity that could not have taken place there, as well as making a reference to the site of Sodom which appears to place Muhammad's community close to the Dead Sea.

Concerning the dates of Muhammad's life, Lawrence Conrad writes that "well into the second century A.H. [Islamic] scholarly opinion on the birth date of the Prophet displayed a range of variance of 85 years. On the assumption that chronology is crucial to the stabilization of any tradition of historical narrative, whether transmitted orally or in writing, one can see in this state of affairs a clear indication that sīra studies in the second century were still in a state of flux". Since second century A.H. scholarly opinion is the earliest scholarly opinion, and assuming the closer scholars were to the actual event the more likely their sources are to be accurate, this suggests a surprising lack of information among Islamic scholars about basic information on Muhammad.

Robert Hoyland suggests his historical importance may have been exaggerated by his followers, writing that "other" Arab leaders "in other locations" had preceded Muhammad in attacking the weakened Byzantine and Persian empires, but these had been "airbrushed out of history by later Muslim writers". Hoyland and other historians argue that the original Arab invaders were not all Muslims.

== Those who see Muhammad as a mythological figure ==
Some historians have posited the belief that Muhammad may be mythical. In their 2003 book Crossroads to Islam, Yehuda D. Nevo and Judith Koren advanced a thesis, based on an extensive examination of archaeological evidence from the Negev desert from the Early Islamic period, that Muhammad may never have existed, with monotheistic Islam only coming into existence some time after he is supposed to have lived. This has been described as "plausible or at least arguable" by David Cook of Rice University, but also compared to Holocaust denial by historian Colin Wells, who suggests that the authors deal with some of the evidence illogically.

In 2007, Karl-Heinz Ohlig suggested that the person of Muhammed was not central to early Islam at all, and that at this very early stage Islam was in fact an Arabic Christian sect which had objections to the concept of the trinity, and that the later hadith and biographies are in large part legends, instrumental in severing Islam from its Christian roots and building a full-blown new religion. In 2008, Sven Kalisch, a former Muslim convert and Germany's first professor of Islamic theology, also questioned whether the prophet Muhammad existed. In 2011, Hans Jansen, a Dutch scholar, expressed similar views.

== See also ==
- Ashtiname of Muhammad
- Reliability of the Quran
- Historicity of Jesus
- Historicity of the Bible
- Historiography of early Islam
- Islam: The Untold Story
- Muhammad's letters to the heads of state
- Phantom time hypothesis
- Relics of Muhammad
- Soviet Orientalist studies in Islam
- Seeing Islam as Others Saw It

== Bibliography ==
- Bennett, Clinton (1998). In search of Muhammad. Continuum. ISBN 978-0-304-70401-9.
- Berg, Herbert; Sarah Rollens (2008). "The Historical Muhammad and the Historical Jesus: A Comparison of Scholarly Reinventions and Reinterpretations". Studies in Religion/Sciences Religieuses. 37 (2): 271–292. doi:10.1177/000842980803700205. S2CID 144445914.
- Cook, Michael (2000). The Koran : A Very Short Introduction. Oxford University Press. ISBN 0192853449.
- Crone, Patricia; Cook, Michael (1977). Hagarism: The Making of the Islamic World. Cambridge University Press. ISBN 0-521-29754-0.
- Donner, Fred McGraw (1998). Narratives of Islamic Origins: The Beginnings of Islamic Historical Writing. Darwin Press. ISBN 0878501274.
- Fouracre, Paul (2006). The New Cambridge Medieval History. Cambridge University Press. ISBN 0-521-36291-1.
- Hoyland, Robert G (1998). Seeing Islam as Others Saw It: A Survey and Evaluation of Christian, Jewish and Zoroastrian Writings on Early Islam. Darwin. ISBN 0-87850-125-8.
- Hoyland, Robert G. (2015). In God's Path: the Arab Conquests and the Creation of an Islamic Empire. Oxford University Press.
- Ibn Warraq, ed. (2000). "2. Origins of Islam: A Critical Look at the Sources". The Quest for the Historical Muhammad. Prometheus. pp. 89–124.
- Jeffrey, Arthur (1952). The Qur'an as Scripture. New York: Russell F. Moore Company.
- Lammens, Henri (2000). Ibn Warraq (ed.). The Quest for the Historical Muhammad. Prometheus.
  - Lammens (2000). "4. The Koran and Tradition". The Quest for the Historical Muhammad. pp. 169–187.
  - Lammens (2000). "5. The Age of Muhammad and the Chronology of the Sira". The Quest for the Historical Muhammad. pp. 188–217.
- Lewis, Bernard (1967). The Arabs in history. Harper & Row. ISBN 9780061310294.
- Nevo, Yehuda D.; Koren, Judith (2000). "Methodological Approaches to Islamic Studies". The Quest for the Historical Muhammad. New York: Prometheus Books. pp. 420–443.
- Nigosian, Solomon Alexander (2004). Islam: Its History, Teaching, and Practices. Indiana University Press. ISBN 0-253-21627-3.
- Peters, F. E. (1991). "The Quest for Historical Muhammad". International Journal of Middle East Studies. doi:10.1017/S0020743800056312. S2CID 162433825.
- Robinson, Neal (1996). Discovering the Qur'an: A Contemporary Approach to a Veiled Text. SCM Press.
- Toral-Niehoff, Isabel (2021). "Talking about Arab Origins: The Transmission of the ayyām al-ʿarab in Kūfa, Baṣra and Baghdād" (PDF). In Scheiner, J.; Janos, D. (eds.). The Place to Go Contexts of Learning in Baghdād, 750-1000 C.E. Darwin Press. pp. 43–69.
- Waines, David (1995). Introduction to Islam. Cambridge University Press. ISBN 0-521-42929-3.
