= Saleh al-Hulail =

- Born: 1327 AH
- Died: 13 Dhu al-Qi'dah 1421 AH
- Occupations: Qadi, Islamic scholar

Saleh bin Abdulaziz bin Othman al-Hulail (1327 AH – 1421 AH) was a prominent Saudi Islamic scholar and Qadi (judge) who served in the national judiciary for over twenty-four years. He was recognized for his contributions to the legal and religious landscape of the Kingdom during the mid-20th century, serving in several major provinces and working alongside some of the most influential religious figures in Saudi history.

== Early life and education ==
Saleh al-Hulail was born in 1327 AH (approximately 1909 AD) in the town of Al-Adhar, located in Al-Dilam, within the Al-Kharj governorate. He was raised in a household deeply rooted in religious tradition; his father, Abdulaziz al-Hulail, was the Imam of the town's central mosque and served as the local official for Hisbah (public accountability and morality).

His initial education began under the tutelage of his father, from whom he learned the foundations of Islamic jurisprudence (Fiqh), monotheism (Tawhid), and Quranic exegesis (Tafsir). Following his father's death, Saleh succeeded him as the Imam of the local mosque, despite his young age. Demonstrating exceptional academic aptitude, he memorized the entire Quran in a single year under the guidance of Sheikh Ibrahim bin Jassas.

Seeking to deepen his knowledge, al-Hulail traveled to Riyadh, which was then emerging as the primary center for Salafi scholarship. In Riyadh, he studied under the Grand Mufti of Saudi Arabia, Sheikh Muhammad ibn Ibrahim Al ash-Sheikh. He later returned to Al-Dilam to continue his studies under Sheikh Abd al-Aziz ibn Baz, who was then serving as a judge in the region. Al-Hulail remained a close student and associate of Ibn Baz until his formal appointment to the judiciary.

== Judicial career ==
Al-Hulail's career in the Saudi judicial system began in Rajab 1371 AH (1952 AD), when he was appointed as a judge for the districts of Wadi ad-Dawasir and As Sulayyil. During this period, the Saudi judicial system was undergoing significant institutionalization, and judges in remote areas often acted as the primary representatives of both religious and civil authority.

In 1374 AH, he was transferred to the court in Al-Aflaj, where he served for five years. His reputation for fairness and deep legal knowledge led to his promotion in 1380 AH (1960 AD) to the Grand Court in Riyadh during the reign of King Saud bin Abdulaziz. Serving in the capital's Grand Court was a position of high prestige, involving complex cases and proximity to the Kingdom's senior leadership.

In 1384 AH, he was reassigned to the court in Hotat Bani Tamim. He remained in this post for approximately twelve years, overseeing legal matters and providing religious guidance to the local population. He continued his service until his retirement in 1395 AH (1975 AD), concluding a judicial career that spanned twenty-four years.

== Later life and community service ==
Following his retirement from the bench, al-Hulail returned to his birthplace in Al-Dilam. He resumed the role his father had held decades earlier, serving as the Imam of the Al-Adhar Mosque. Despite his retirement, he remained an active figure in the community, offering legal consultations, teaching religious texts, and mediating local disputes. His presence in Al-Dilam was seen as a continuation of the scholarly legacy of the region, which had been a stronghold of traditional learning for generations.

Al-Hulail was known for his ascetic lifestyle and his dedication to the Quran. Reports from his contemporaries suggest that even in his later years, he maintained a rigorous schedule of worship and study, often being sought out by younger students for his insights into the judicial practices of the early Saudi state.

== Illness and death ==
In his final years, al-Hulail suffered from age-related illnesses that eventually restricted his mobility. He was admitted to King Khalid Hospital in Al-Kharj after his health deteriorated. He passed away a week later on 13 Dhu al-Qi'dah 1421 AH (February 2001 AD). His funeral was attended by a large number of scholars, former colleagues from the judiciary, and residents of the Al-Kharj and Al-Dilam regions, reflecting his standing in the community.
