= Hagarenes =

Arab conquerors

Hagarenes (Ancient Greek: Ἀγαρηνοί Agarenoi, Classical Syriac: ܗܓܪܝܐ Hagráyé or ܡܗܓܪܝܐ Mhaggráyé, Armenian: Հագարացի) is a term widely used by early Syriac, Greek, Coptic and Armenian sources to describe the early Arab conquerors of Mesopotamia, Syria and Egypt.

The name was used in Christian literature and Byzantine chronicles for "Hanif" Arabs, and later for Islamic forces as a synonym of the term Saracens. The Syriac term Hagraye can be roughly translated as "the followers or descendants of Hagar", and the other frequent name, Mhaggraye, is thought to have connections with the Arabic Muhajir; other scholars assume that the terms may not be of Christian origin. Greek authors have also used the term to refer to nomadic Bedouin from the Syrian steppes east of Roman Syria, pejoratively referring to the conquerors' supposed descent from Abraham via Hagar. Patricia Crone and Michael Cook claim in their book, Hagarism: The Making of the Islamic World, that the term was introduced by the Muslims themselves who described their military advance into the Levant and Jerusalem in particular as a Hijra.

The name, used interchangeably with Ishmaelites, came also to mean any Muslim. An example of its current usage is Ahryani (Aхряни), a name used for Bulgarian Muslims in colloquial Bulgarian, but the term has also been explained as paralleling the spread of Balkan Islam with anti-trinitarian Arianism.

== See also ==
- Saracen
- Ishmaelites
- Magarites
- Muhajirun
