= List of historicities =

List of articles whose focus is its historicity

The list of historicitices, is a list of articles whose focus is the historicity of a particular thing.

== Historicities of people ==
- Historicity of Jesus
- Historicity of King Arthur
- Historicity of Muhammad

== Historicities of literature ==
- Historicity of the Bible
- Historicity of the Book of Mormon
- Historicity of the Iliad
