= Commanding Right and Forbidding Wrong in Islamic Thought =

2000 book by Michael Cook

- Author: Michael Cook
- Publisher: Cambridge University Press
- Publication date: 2000
- Pages: 719
- ISBN: 978-0521130936

Commanding Right and Forbidding Wrong in Islamic Thought is a 2000 non-fiction book by Michael Cook. It discusses the evolution of the Islamic concept of enjoining good and forbidding wrong (al-amr bi-ma’ruf wa nahi ‘an al-munkar). The book has won the Albert Hourani Book Award and the Farabi Award.

The 700-page book is divided into five sections and 20 chapters. It was translated into Persian in 2005 and received widespread attention in Iran, where it went through three printings by 2008. The Persian editions sold more copies than the English editions. Indonesian and Arabic translations of the book are also available. An epitome of Michael Cook's book was published by the Cambridge University Press in 2003 under the title Forbidding Wrong in Islam. According to Cook, while the first title is organized around "schools, sects, and individuals", the epitome version focuses on the thematic questions.

Cook argues that despite the topic being understandable in almost every culture, very few have given it such accurate attention. Michael Cook analyzes the differences between Islamic and Western conceptions of wrong as well as a suggested course of action. Islam has laws and procedures to prevent wrongdoing, but the West prefers to wait until a wrong has been committed before acting. It is a fundamental difference between Islam and the West. When anything goes wrong, Cook describes the Western approach as "rescue", but the Islamic viewpoint is "forbidding wrong".

== Content ==
Commanding Right and Forbidding Wrong in Islamic Thought is an attempt to respond to the question of whether or not one should intervene if he sees a wrong being committed in public. In other words, Michael Cook's book focuses on the "Islamic duty to lead others to do good and, especially, to stop others from doing wrong". He follows in his book the development of the ideas over Commanding Right and Forbidding Wrong via investigating the large amount of content produced by Muslim scholars. All major schools of law, both Sunni and Shia, are considered along with some smaller sects. In that regard, "minute points of agreement and dissent, as well as to common roots of the different views" are noted.

Michael Cook discusses the distinction between Islamic and Western concepts of wrong along with the actions to take in this regard. One significant contrast between Islam and the West is that, although Islam has rules and processes in place to avoid wrongdoing, the West prefers to wait until a wrong has already been done before taking action. Cook defines the Western response to wrong as "rescue", and the Islamic perspective is "forbidding wrong". While the West penalizes drunk driving, Islam forbids drinking altogether.

In his book, Cook discusses Islamic and Western concepts of right and wrong after establishing the distinction between rescuing and prohibiting wrong. Both Islamic and Western civilizations condemn wrongs that cause harm to others; nevertheless, Islam considers wrongs against both individuals and God. Cook says: "The prevalent Western values thus tell Muslims that it is our business how they treat other Muslims; and at the same time they tell them that it is not their business how other Muslims should choose to live".

Cook states at the outset of his comparison of the Shia and the Sunni ulama in contemporary times that the Shia legacy is still alive. At the same time, the Sunni tradition has become a moribund if revered heritage (turath). The significant distinction is due, in part, to the fact that Imami ideology is focused on a single nation (Iran), and Sunni ideology lacks a similar territorial concentration. Ayatollah Khomeini's confrontation with the Shah and the Islamic Revolution that followed it united the Imami world in a way that no recent event has united the Sunni world. As a result, the Shia ulama provides society with Islamic responses to contemporary questions, and the Sunni ulama are becoming even more socially irrelevant.

== Reception ==
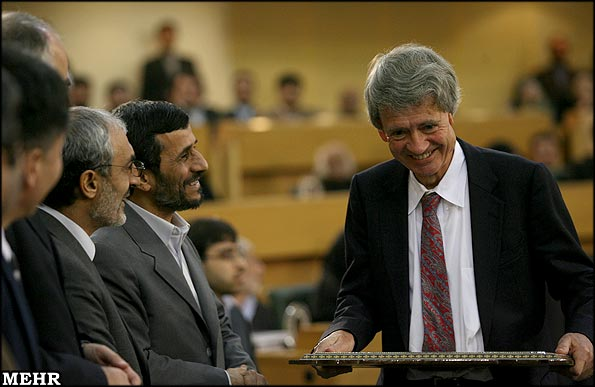
Cook receiving the Farabi International Award in 2008, Mahmoud Ahmadinejad presiding

The book has been reviewed by Donna Robinson Divine and Ulrike Freitag.

Fred Donner praises the book as the pinnacle of classical philological orientalism, Christopher Melchert, Paul R. Powers, and Andrew Rippen all give positive assessments, and Michael Chamberlain calls it a "masterpiece". Wilfred Madelung adds one paragraph of criticism while at the same time predicting that the book will certainly become "a standard reference work in Islamic studies". The book is further portrayed as "a welcome and timely addition to the literature on Islamic thought" and as being "detailed and extensive". It is accessible to all audiences and is not very difficult to read.
