= Yehuda D. Nevo =

Israeli archaeologist (1932–1992)

Yehuda D. Nevo (Hebrew: יהודה נבו; 1932 – 12 February 1992) was an Israeli archaeologist and historian, best known for his revisionist studies of early Islam.

== Biography ==
Yehuda was born in Haifa to a Jewish family. His father died when he was nine months old and his mother chose not to raise him. He moved between various foster families, and grew up with the Nachshonim ('Pioneers') youth company A of Kibbutz Beit Alfa. He married Miriam Dayan, and divorced her after a short period.

=== Military service ===
Nevo became an officer despite not completing an officer course, and he guided a sergeant course in the village of al-Damun. In early 1951 Nevo and two other soldiers were taken captive by the Syrian Army. Nevo later stated that he was initially tortured, and later received better treatment. Shoshana Har-Zion was later imprisoned in the same prison, along with two other Israelis, and they communicated by tapping the walls dividing their cells, but did not meet face-to-face. Nevo returned to Israel in a captive exchange deal at the end of 1951. After returning from captivity, he passed an intelligence officers' course and worked in the Northern Command. On July 12, 1953, Nevo participated in a retributory operation in Nabi Samuel, after two soldiers were murdered in Even Sapir. With the establishment of Unit 101 in August 1953, he was among the first fighters in the unit and participated in the Kibbia massacre, after which he left the unit. He later stated that the events in Kibbia haunted him for the rest of his life.

=== Civilian life ===
After his discharge, Nevo worked as a shepherd in Kibbutz Beit Alfa and also worked as a publisher in Jerusalem. He then worked as an archaeologist. Among other things, Nevo conducted an archaeological survey in the Hula Valley together with Miriam Dayan, as well as conducting an archaeological survey around Kibbutz Metzer. During this period, he also suggested identifying the city of "Sfati" mentioned in Thutmose III's campaign with a tel east of Givat Ada. In the early 1960s, he worked for several years on a historical novel dealing with Judaea, but finally chose not to publish it.

Nevo was one of the pioneers of the study of the Early Islamic period in Israel. For his research, he lived in Sde Boker Midrasha and from there he left with research expeditions to carry out his research on the ground. He chose to change his original last name of Dayan to Nevo, to avoid being constantly asked if he was a relative of Moshe Dayan.

=== End of life ===
Nevo was ill for a period, and on February 12, 1992, he put an end to his life, committing suicide. Yehuda was buried in Kibbutz Sde Boker's cemetery, near the place of his main research at the kibbutz, which was called "The Lost City".

His chldhood and youth were the subject of Michael Lev-Tov's "The Spirit of Things", a film about the story of the Israeli kibbutz. The film opens up with the story of Yehuda Dayan Nevo of Kibbutz Beit Alfa, based on a silent film from the Kibbutz produced in 1952.

His tombstone was engraved in accordance with his wishes: "I saw from the other side - Yehuda Nevo"; probably a reference to the changing of his surname to Nebo/Nevo, which is known as Moses' burial place, and to Rachel Bluwstein's poem "From the other side".

== Research on the archaeology and formation of Islam ==
Nevo was active in the Negev Archaeological Project on the Early Muslim period and the rural settlement in the Negev in the 6-8 centuries AD, under the management of the Institute of Archaeology of the Hebrew University of Jerusalem (HUJI). He undertook much of the excavations with his own hands, without workers, with the help og his friends Amnon Rotenberg and Nurit Tsafrir.

=== Discovery of the rock inscriptions ===
In 1981, he and his research group discovered four hundred rock inscriptions in ancient Arabic scripts at a site in the Negev Desert near Sde Boker. The site is known as 'The Lost City' (Site 92, Israel Survey, map of Sde Boker West). This discovery led him, along with Judith Koren from the University of Haifa, to reexamine the sources of Islam and early Muslim history.

Nevo presented the first results of the said project at the 3rd International Colloquium organised by the Hebrew University in 1985 on the topic From Jahiliyya to Islam, under the title "Sde Boqer and the Central Negev, 7th-8th Century AD". He continued his research and published the results in an article on Arab paganism in the Negev during the Byzantine period, which he presented at the fifth Colloquium in this series, in 1990. His last article on the subject, "Towards a Prehistory of Islam" ("ahead of Islamic History") was published in 1994 after his death, edited by the journal editors.

The full texts of the Negev rock inscriptions, including copying, decoding and translation, were published by Nevo, Zemira Cohen and Dalia Heftman in their book Ancient Arabic Inscriptions from the Negev. Before publishing this book, the findings were gradually published in 1981-1982 and 1986-1988. These inscriptions were the basis for questioning Islamic sources and Early Islamic history, which led to conclusions that contradict the official history of Islamic sources. Nevo belongs to the Revisionist school of Islamic studies.

=== Development of support for the Revisionist School in Islamic Studies ===
In his book Crossroads to Islam: the origins of the Arab religion and the Arab state , which he wrote with Judith Koren and which was published after his death, Nevo presented a theory about the origins and development of the Islamic state and Islamic religion. Like a number of Western researchers before him, each for different reasons, he doubted the historical validity of classical Islamic traditions about the early days of Islam. The first part of the book describes, based on archaeological findings published by other archeologists, the cessation of maintenance of the distant Middle Eastern province by the Byzantine Empire and the empire's withdrawal from the region, following the loss of the economic motive for continual maintenance of the province. Based on these findings, it becomes apparent that there was no Arab conquest from the south. Rather, the Arabs who seized power after the Byzantine Empire's withdrawal left a power vacuum in the region. These were either local Arabs, or tribes from the desert recruited by the empire to maintain its desert borders, prior to the empire abandoning the region. Although a condition for "partnership" with the Byzantines was the adoption of Christianity, in practice, officially, the head of the tribe declared his belief in Christianity (and therefore including every member of the tribe), but in reality they remained idol worshippers as before. Later in the book, based on the analysis of historical sources and the Negev inscriptions, Nevo and Koren describe how,, over time, these Arabs adopted the Christian monotheism of the sedentary population which they began to control, and subsequently established an independent religion. According to this reading of the historical findings, the stories of Muhammad and the Qur'an are not completely true.

This strong skepticism led to a poignant criticism by other historians. However, Koren and Nevo published in 1991 a paper explaining their approach to the study of Islamic history. This paper was later included in a collection of "revisionist" articles, "The Quest For the Historical Muhammad", which he published with scholar Ibn Warraq.

As stated, other researchers came to similar conclusions before him, such as John E. Wansborough, who investigated in depth the Qur'an text, and reached the conclusion that it was a collection of sayings that "were in the field" and joined together into a holy book only in the mid-8th century, an opinion that Nevo also came from his research on the sails he found in the play.

German theologian Karl-Heinz Ohlig, in an extensive article, built on Nevo's theory as detailed in his book Crossroads to Islam and developed it on to another. But a few years later, in the book Die dunklen Anfänge (lit. 'The Dark Beginnings'), which appeared in German only, co-edited by Ohlig, he developed his theory in a completely different way and no longer mentions Nevo's work. In this book, Ohlig claims that while "Muhammad was a title ("the acclaimed") and not a personal name (a claim that was taken directly from Nevo's research), it was a title attributed to Jesus, which means the acclaimed prophet of the Arabs was the Christian Jesus - something completely contrary to Nevo's theory.

Many later studies debating Nevo's theory were subsequently published, such as the work of Polish researcher M. Grodzki and more.

A theory similar to Nevo's own on the formation of Islam is that of Hagarism. Yet another similar theory appeared in the 19th century, long before the development of the Hagarism theory: Reinhart Dozy wrote in his 1864 book De Israelietan Te Mekka ("The Israelites in Mecca"), that Islam was influenced in the beginning by the tribe of Simon, which had long left the Israelite tribal alliance to resettle in the Arabian Peninsula. Following the sons of Simon, the belief in Jahiliyyah was not as described in Islamic sources as idolatry, but a belief in a one invisible Abrahamic God. In his opinion, there are even some clues to this in the Bible even in the Bible, such as the unreasonable diminishing of the tribe of Simon over the course of the Book of Numbers. It may be added that Beer-lahai-roi is identified by some in Arabia with the Well of Zamzam in Mecca, and may be identified with the "Study Hall of Shem and Eber" from rabbinical tradition.

Some argue that Nevo's view that Islamic traditions regarding Muhammad's origins have already long been expressed by Shi'ite Islam.

== Research ==
Nevo discovered Kufic inscriptions in the Negev desert in Israel, four hundred of which were published in Ancient Arabic Inscriptions from the Negev. This led him and Judith Koren, a librarian at the University of Haifa, to re-examine the origins of Islam, and Early Islamic history.

They fundamentally doubt the historicity of Islamic traditional accounts of Early Islam, thus adhering to the Revisionist School of Islamic Studies. Nevo and Koren co-authored a work called Crossroads to Islam: The Origins of the Arab Religion and the Arab State, which presents a theory of the origins and development of the Islamic state and religion. According to them, the Arabs conquered the Near East with a mixture of pre-Islamic pagan and "Indeterminate Monotheistic" beliefs. The Arabs' beliefs were modified in contact with the Jewish-Christian monotheism they encountered in the conquered land. Nevo's research cast doubts on the historicity of the traditional narrative of Muhammad as a prophet and the traditional history of the Quran.

Some of Nevo's work is also published in the book Quest for the Historical Muhammad, edited by Ibn Warraq.

== Publications ==
- Nevo, Yehuda D. (1990). "The Origins of the Muslim Descriptions of the Jahili Meccan Sanctuary", Journal of Near Eastern Studies, no. 1
- Nevo, Yehuda D. (1991). Pagans and herders: a re-examination of the Negev runoff cultivation systems in the Byzantine and early Arab periods, IPS, Negev, Israel, ISBN 965-435-000-9
- Nevo, Yehuda D.; Cohen, Zemira; Heftman, Dalia eds. (1993). Ancient Arabic inscriptions from the Negev, IPS, Negev, Israel, ISBN 965-435-001-7
- Nevo, Yehuda D.; Koren, Judith (2000). "Methodological Approaches to Islamic Studies". The Quest for the Historical Muhammad. New York: Prometheus Books. pp. 420–443.
- Nevo, Yehuda D.; Koren, Judith (2003). Crossroads to Islam: the origins of the Arab religion and the Arab state, Prometheus Books, Amherst, NY, ISBN 1-59102-083-2
