= Enjoining good and forbidding wrong =

Two Islamic requisites from the Quran

Enjoining good and forbidding wrong (Arabic: ٱلْأَمْرُ بِٱلْمَعْرُوفِ وَٱلنَّهْيُ عَنِ ٱلْمُنْكَرِ, romanized: al-amru bi-l-maʿrūfi wa-n-nahyu ʿani-l-munkari) are two important duties imposed by God in Islam according to the Quran and Hadith.

This expression is the base of the classical Islamic institution of ḥisba, the individual or collective duty (depending on the Islamic school of law) to intervene and enforce Islamic law. It forms a central part of the Islamic doctrine for Muslims. The injunctions also constitute two of the ten Ancillaries of the Faith of Twelver Shi'ism.

Pre-modern Islamic literature describes pious Muslims (usually scholars) taking action to forbid wrong by destroying forbidden objects, particularly liquor and musical instruments are haram. In the contemporary Muslim world, various state or parastatal bodies (often with phrases like the "Promotion of Virtue and the Prevention of Vice" in their titles) have appeared in Afghanistan, Iran, Saudi Arabia, Nigeria, Malaysia, the Gaza Strip, etc., at various times and with various levels of power, to combat sinful activities and compel virtuous ones. (The power of the Saudi religious police was sharply curtailed in 2016)

== Terminology ==
Ma'ruf, usually translated as "good", "right" or "just", appears 38 times in slightly varying forms in the Qurʾān. Traditional commentators oppose the association of maʿrūf with its cognate urf, "custom."

Although most common translations of maʿrūf is "good" and munkar "evil", the words used for good and evil in Islamic philosophy are ḥusn and qubh. In its most common usage, maʿrūf is "in accordance with the custom", while munkar (singular nukr), which has no place in the custom, is the opposite. In today's religious expression, maʿrūf is best translated as sunnah and munkar as bid’a. (a related topic: Istihsan)

Depending on the translation from the Quran, the phrase may also be translated as commanding what is just and forbidding what is evil, commanding right and forbidding wrong, and other combinations of "enjoin" or "command", "right" or "just", "wrong", "unjust", or "evil".

== Scriptural basis ==
Answering the question of why there is a duty among Muslims to forbid wrong are statements in the Quran and hadith.

=== Quran ===
- Let there arise out of you a band of people inviting to all that is good, enjoining what is right, and forbidding what is wrong: They are the ones to attain felicity. -- Quran 3:104 ^{translated by Abdullah Yusuf Ali} (Note: alternative translation of Q.3:104: Let there arise out of you a nation who invites to goodness and enjoin What is right and forbid What is evil: They are the ones to attain felicity.)
- Ye are the best of peoples, evolved for mankind, enjoining what is right, forbidding what is wrong, and believing in Allah. If only the People of the Book had faith, it were best for them: among them are some who have faith, but most of them are transgressors. -- Quran 3:110 ^{translated by Abdullah Yusuf Ali} (Note: alternative translation of Q.3:110: You are the best community that has been raised up for mankind: You enjoin What is right and forbid What is evil, and You believe in Allah; if the people of the scripture deary it, it had been better for them, some of them believers, but most of them are evil-livers.)
- The believers, both men and women, are guardians of one another. They encourage good and forbid evil, establish prayer and pay alms-tax, and obey Allah and His Messenger... (Q.9:71) (Note: translation from Mustafa Khattab, the Clear Quran)
- ˹It is the believers˺ who repent, who are devoted to worship, who praise ˹their Lord˺, who fast, who bow down and prostrate themselves, who encourage good and forbid evil, and who observe the limits set by Allah... (Q.9:112) (Note: translation from Mustafa Khattab, the Clear Quran)
- “O people! Establish prayer, encourage what is good and forbid what is evil, and endure patiently whatever befalls you. (Q.31:17) (Note: translation from Mustafa Khattab, the Clear Quran)
- O you who have believed, upon you is [responsibility for] yourselves. Those who have gone astray will not harm you when you have been guided. To Allāh is your return all together; then He will inform you of what you used to do. (Q.5:105)

Scholars have provided a number of reasons why the obvious reading of this verse is incorrect, such as that it refers not to the present but "to some future time when forbidding wrong will cease to be effective."

=== Hadith ===
Appearing in Sahih Muslim, the second most prestigious collection of Sunni hadith is a famous report:

- Abu Sa‘id al-Khudri reported that the prophet Muhammad said, "Whoever amongst you sees an evil, he must change it with his hand. If he is not able to do so, then with his tongue. And if he is not able to do so, then with his heart, and that is the weakest form of faith".

Mutazilite and Shia Imamis quote different traditions than this Sunni Hadith, but all agree on the Quran and on "the existence of the duty" to command and forbid.

According to historian Michael Cook (whose book Commanding Right and Forbidding Wrong in Islamic Thought is the major English language source on the issue), a slightly different phrase is used in a similar hadith -- 'righting wrong' (taghyir al-munkar) instead of 'forbidding wrong' (an-nahy ʿani-l-munkar) -- but "scholars take it for granted" that 'the two "are the same thing, ..."

Sunnis, Ibadis and Twelver (also called Imami) Shia schools of Islam "made extensive use of" the "schema" set out by this hadith.

== History ==
=== Pre-Islamic ===
Phrases similar to forbidding evil and commanding good can be found examining texts of ancient Greek philosophers -- Stoic Chrysippus (d.207 BC) and Aristotle (d.322) -- and the founder the Buddha. A particularly similar formulation is found in the book of Psalms: "Depart from evil, and do good; seek peace, and pursue it". (Psalm 34:14). There is also the Targumic and New Testament phrase of binding and loosing.

However, Michael Cook finds no "serious precedent" for use of the phrases "forbidding wrong" and "commanding right" in the literature of the immediate predecessors of Muhammad his companions, pre-Islamic Arabian traditions and poetry.

=== Muhtasib ===
Traditionally, in classical Islamic administrations, there was an office of al-hisbah, an inspector of "markets and morals", the holder of which was called a muhtasib. He was appointed by the caliph to oversee the order in market places, in businesses, in medical occupations, etc. He "had no jurisdiction to hear cases—only to settle disputes and breaches of the law where the facts were admitted or there was a confession of guilt."

=== General term ===
Hisbah as a "general term for 'forbidding wrong'" has a later origin, and the difference in the terms has caused some confusion. According to Michael Cook, the second use is "mainly an invention" of Al-Ghazali" (d.1111), who followed a precedent set by "a somewhat earlier scholar", Mawardi (d.1058) and "adopted the word hisba" as it is currently used.

A slightly different definition than Al-Ghazali's comes from ʿAbd al-Ghani al-Nābulusī (d.1731), who distinguished between forbidding wrong and ḥisbah. The first being a duty to call on the wrongdoer to stop, but carrying "no power or duty of enforcement"; and ḥisbah or censorship, (according to ʿAbd al-Ghani), being the duty to enforce right conduct (ḥaml al-nās ʿalā ʾl-ṭāʿa) and reserved to authorities—unless the offense was being committed while the "ordinary believer" could intervene.

=== Islamic scholarship ===
Scholars opinions and ideas on forbidding wrong are found in legal literature such as collections of fatawas, in theological handbooks, monographs devoted to the subject, and in commentaries on the Qur'an and Hadith. Sunni Scholar Ibn Taymiyya's work discusses Enjoining Right and Forbidding Wrong. It could be said that some Sunni works of jurisprudence do not specifically cover the topic of Forbidding Wrong, but Twelver (Ja'fari school of thought) scholars along with others among Zaydis and Ibadi branches of Islam do.

=== Al-Ghazali ===
Al-Ghazali (1058-1111 CE) was "perhaps the first major Islamic thinker to devote substantial amount of space" to these two duties, and his account of forbidding wrong in (Book 19 of his) The Revival of the Religious Sciences, is "innovative, insightful, and rich in detail" and "achieved a wide currency in the Islamic world." He wrote:

Every Muslim has the duty of first setting himself to rights, and then, successively, his household, his neighbours, his quarter, his town, the surrounding countryside, the wilderness with its Bedouins, Kurds, or whatever, and so on to the uttermost ends of earth.

=== Modern era ===
What Ghazali wrote about was the "personal duty to right wrongs committed by fellow believers as and when one encountered them." This theme also formed the "core" of the "scholastic heritage" on the subject created by other medieval scholars. But in the modern era "the conception" of forbidding wrong has changed and become more systematic. Now opposing wrongdoing involves "the organised propagation of Islamic values," according to Cook, which requires missionary work and organisation. And several contemporary Muslim majority states or provinces have some kind of Islamic "religious police".

== Issues: By whom, to whom, about what ==
While scripture is clear that a community is enjoined to command right and forbid wrong, it does not indicate whether this included all Muslims or only some.

Three "basic questions arising "about the duty of forbidding wrong" are

- who has to do it,
- to whom, and
- about what?"

Differences in scholarly debates over the duty of "commanding right and forbidding wrong" stemmed from the positions taken by jurists (Faqīh) on questions regarding who precisely was responsible for carrying out the duty, to whom it was to be directed, and what performance of the duty entailed. Often, these debates were framed according to what Michael Cook calls the "three modes" tradition, a tradition based on a prophetic hadith which identifies the "heart" (qalb), "tongue" (lisān), and "hand" (yad) as the three proper "modes" by which one should fulfill the obligation. Depending on a number of factors both intrinsic and extrinsic to their legal schools, scholars apportioned this labor in differing ways, some reserving the execution of the duty by "tongue" for the scholars and by "hand" for the political authorities such as the muḥtasib, or those invested with the authority to carry out the duty on their behalf, and others arguing that these modes extended to all qualified believers.

=== Who should do the enforcing ===
Scholars argue that free (non-slave) adult male Muslims are obliged to forbid wrongdoing, and that non-Muslims are excluded from the duty. Michael Cook paraphrases al-Ghazali in asking, "After all, since the duty consists in coming to the aid of the faith, how could one of its enemies [an unbeliever] perform it?" and points out that if a nonbeliever upbraided a Muslim for wrongdoing he would "presuming to exercise an illegitimate authority over the Muslim", who should never be humiliated by an unbeliever. Those who lack legal competency (mukallaf), such as children and the mentally ill, are also excluded. However, scholars are generally "reluctant to restrict the range of those for whom forbidding wrong is a duty", and so usually include two other groups not possessing the rights of free adult male Muslims—namely slaves and women. "Sinners" are also not exempt according to the "standard" view of Islamic scholars.

Schools of law differ over whether hisbah (forbidding wrong) is an "individual duty" (i.e. an obligation of all believers described above), or collective duty (an obligation where once a sufficient number of Muslims undertake it, others cease to be obligated). According to Cook, "the standard view" of pre-modern scholars was that the duty was collective, though some held it was individual or both collective and individual, meaning that "at the point at which we come upon the wrongdoing, or the wrongdoer starts his mischief, we are all obligated; but once you take care of the matter, the rest of us have no further obligation."

Who is eligible to use force (their "hand") to command and forbid is disputed, some reserving it for the political authorities or their underlings. ("At different times" a position supported by the Shafites, the Malikis and the Hanafis). "The view that punishment is to inflicted only by the state, and not by individuals, is widespread, if not quite universal." Others argue that these modes extended to all qualified believers.

According to Al-Nawawi, 'changing the reprehensible by hand,' or by compulsion, like jihad, was the purview of the state alone; changing with the tongue' was the right of the ulama; ordinary, individual Muslims should only reject the reprehensible with their hearts. In practice, as far as can be determined, the people who went around commanding and forbidding in pre-modern Islam, were "overwhelmingly scholars", according to Michael Cook.

==== Rebellion ====
Regarding rebellion as a means of overturning state/ruler wrong, Cook finds the opinions of Islamic scholars "heavily stacked" against this approach. In general this was because rebellion was often foolhardy and dangerous to the rebel, not because it was disrespectful to the ruler. This did not stop political rebels in the early centuries of Islam from using forbidding wrong as their slogan, according to Cook. Examples were "found among the Kharijites, including the Ibadis, among the Shi'ites, including Zaydis, and among the Sunnis, especially the Malikis. Some instances of such rebels in the early centuries of Islam are Jahm ibn Safwan (d.746), in late Umayyad Transoxiana, Yusuf al-Barm in Khurasan in 776 CE, Al-Mubarqa in Palestine 841/42 CE, Ibn al-Qitt in Spain in 901 CE and an `Abbasid who rebelled in Armenia in 960" CE.

=== What was enforced ===
According to the well known exegete Al-Tabari (d.923) "right" refers to all that God and His Prophet have commanded, "wrong" to all that they have forbidden, i.e. the sharia. Al-Nawawi also stated that Shariah principles determined what was to be commanded and forbidden.

However, the verses are vague and do not speak of Sharia/God's law. According to Michael Cook, "a trend" in early exegesis (tafsir) indicated the duty referred to affirming the basic message of Islam—and so commanded only the "unity of God" and "veracity" of his prophet, and forbade polytheism and denial of Muhammad's prophethood.

There are also scholarly disagreements between schools of fiqh (madhhab).

==== Types of wrongdoing ====
Al-Ghazali provides "a survey" of wrongs commonly found in the mosque, the market, the street, the bath-house and hospitality". For example, in "hospitality" there may be,

"laying out silk coverings for men, using censers made of silver or gold, hanging curtains with images on them [images of sentient beings are forbidden among some branches of Islam] and listening to musical instruments or singing-girls. Then there is the scandal of women gathering on roofs to watch men when there are youths among them who could give rise to temptation. Or forbidden food may be served or the house may be one occupied illegally, or someone present may be drinking wine or wearing silk or a golden signet ring, or a heretic may be holding forth about his heresy, or some joker may be regaling the party with ribald and untruthful humour. (Humour that is neither untruthful nor indecorous is acceptable in moderation, provided it does not become a habit.) On top of all this there may be extravagance and wastefulness."

Common wrongdoing described by Al-Ghazali committed (for example in the marketplace) may be divided into categories such as

- commercial dishonesty (e.g. passing off used goods as new, concealing defects in goods),
- transactions that violate Islamic law (e.g. allowing the customer to pay over time but charging interest), and
- selling goods forbidden by Islamic law (musical instruments, wine).

On the other hand, looking at the violations (found not just in the marketplace) through modern eyes, they can be categorized (Note: by Michael Cook) into a different set of norms being violated:

- Narrow "religious norms", such as "sloppy prayer, faulty recitation of the Quran". These were relatively rare, based on the fact that they were seldom mentioned in sources available to determine "what forbidding wrong was really like" in the pre-modern Islamic world, i.e. the writings of the same scholars who wrote about forbidding wrong.
- "Secular norms", i.e. the straightward "rights of other humans in this world", such as commercial dishonesty mentioned above and things like "blocking a street". These were even more rare than violations of the narrow "religious norms. It "is worth noting", however, that among these violations Al-Ghazali gives no sign of ... a concern for what we might call social justice", though there are occasional references to injustices such as a master beating his slave, or a man depriving "his sisters of rights of inheritance",
- "puritanical norms", usually involving "wine, women and song". These violations, "are by far" the most widespread of the three kinds of wrongs, and among these "puritanical" violations, "liquor and music" were "the most widespread" wrongs "by far", with forbidden relations between the sexes taking "a poor third" according to the scholars.

=== How was good to be enforced ===
A pious tract Commentary of Forty Hadiths of An Nawawi, citing different scholars, gives various advice to "callers" who enjoin good and forbid evil. They should first warn the offenders of the consequences of evil, and only after this approach has been "fully utilised" should they proceed to "the hand".

Use of the tongue could vary from "a delicate hint" to "a ruthless tongue lashing", and the hand from "a restraining hand" to use of arms. Al-Ghazali believed the use of a group of armed fighters to combat wrongdoing did not require the permission of the ruler if good Muslims thought it necessary to escalate the fight that far.

Callers should possess virtuous "qualities": sincerity, knowledge, wisdom, forbearance, patience, humility, courage, generosity. Greater evils should get priority over lower ones. Callers should speak to wrongdoers in private when possible to avoid "scolding".

When all else fails and the only portion of the hadith available to a Muslim witnessing an evil act is to dislike the evil they come across, the Muslim might say to themselves:

"O Allah, there is nothing that I can do to change this bad situation that You dislike and disapprove except that I hate it to take place. I do not agree to it. O Allah forgive me, guide me and save my heart to be influenced by it."

In so doing "the heart of the believer who witnesses that evil" is protected from being influenced by it, though of course, this is not really hisbah in the sense that it does not command or forbid.

Other means

A step between use of the tongue and a "purely mental act" of the heart in fighting evil is showing disapproval by "range of behavior running from frowns to turning away from the offender to formally ostracising him (hajr)".

Some believed there was yet another mode beyond hand, voice and heart -- "spiritual power" (inkār al-munkar biʾl-ḥāl). According to some Sufis, they could fight wrongdoing by supernatural means—turning wine into vinegar or water, using spiritual force to cause wine vessels to break, or a rapist to collapse, etc.

==== What was destroyed or disrupted ====
In Islamic literature on the subject, an "ubiquitous theme" is attack on forbidden objects—the overturning of chessboards, the destruction of musical instrument and sacred trees, defacing of decorative images.

Punishment could be very broadly enforced. Cook writes that

"according to a thirteenth-century geographer, a custom was observed each year in Gilan in the north of Iran, [whereby] scholars would seek permission from the ruler to command right. Once they had it, they would round up everyone and flog them. If a man swore that he had neither drunk nor fornicated, the scholar would ask him his trade; if he said he was a grocer, the scholar would infer that he cheated his customer, and flog him anyway."

=== Arguments against, or for limitations on ===
"Straightforward denial" that forbidding wrong is a duty of Muslims is "very rare", and non-existent after the first two centuries of Islam.

Some scholars (Hasan al-Basri, Abdullah ibn Shubruma d.761) have argued that forbidding wrong is to be encouraged but not an obligation. Other groups (Hanbalites, Shia) have been accused (unjustly or with exaggeration) of denying it is obligatory.

Sufis have been linked to concepts "that downplay forbidding wrong in one way or another" (tolerance, mysticism, introspection), but there is "no mainstream Sufi doctrine rejecting the duty as such", and many Sufis practice it.

The only "consolidated doctrine" that Muslims ought not to forbid wrong came from Sufi ʿAbd al-Ghani al-Nābulusī (d.1731), a Sufi who lived in the midst of the Kadizadeli puritanical campaign in Baghdad, a campaign whose "prime target" was Sufis. ʿAbd al-Ghani argued that while forbidding wrong was righteous in theory, the intentions of the believers in forbidding wrong were paramount, and what with the danger of "those who whose obsession with prying into the faults of others" making "them blind to their own", what was needed instead was "less self-righteousness and more self-knowledge". (Note: quotations from Cook) His argument "achieved no wider success".

==== Hisbah v. privacy ====
An argument for commanding right and forbidding wrong and against the concept of "minding ones own business" comes from Hanafi jurist `Ismat Allah of Saharanpur who writes:

were it pleasing to God to leave people alone, He would not have sent prophets, nor established their laws, nor called to Islam, nor voided other religions, but would rather have left people to their own devices, untroubled by divine visitations; ...

The issue is relevant to situations scholars examined (and disagree on) where an enforcers saw what could be a "bottle of liquor or lute" hidden under a robe, or a man and woman that looked like they might be unmarried, or heard music coming from a home.

Cook finds that Sunni fundamentalist clerics give relatively little attention to privacy rights, giving approval to the entering of a home when reliable information indicates there may be wrongdoing within.

On the other hand, at least one Iranian Twelve Shia cleric (Seyyed Hassan Eslami Ardakani), has argued that there are Islamic precedents for denouncing intrusive efforts to forbid wrong as violations of Islamic law, and that the category of Islamic norms (ādāb) developed by Ghazali for forbidding sin should include prohibitions on interference in the private lives of others by "spying" or "curtain-ripping", (i.e. the "exposure of hidden sins"). (Cook questions whether this suggestion is a contemporary attack on "the entire apparatus of religious enforcement in the Islamic Republic" and influenced by "Western conceptions of rights".)

Eslami cites the story of how the second Caliph, Umar ibn al-Khattab, climbed a wall to catch a man in the act of wrongdoing but in so doing violated the Quran in three ways; by spying (tajassus) (Q.49:12), by entering through the roof (instead of the door) (Q.2:189), and by entering his home without first pronouncing a greeting (Q.24:27).

== Modern world ==
Difficulties confronting pious forbidders

Some of the challenges to Al-Ghazali's concept of individual Muslims forbidding wrong in the modern world include the influence of "universal" western values, and the growth of the strength and reach of the state.

While pious forbidders of wrong have always had to deal with the riposte: "What's it to you?", in the modern world they also hear "I'm free! It's a free country, it's a democracy!" from people "with their heads stuffed full of western ideas" like personal freedom and individualism. Conservatives despair that "debauchery and sin [when "victimless crimes"], are considered to be 'personal matters'" in which interference is a violation of the sinners' rights. Many Muslims live in secular countries where the charging of interest on loans, drinking of wine and fornication are all legal.

The decline in seclusion of Muslim societies and the stronger sense that the Muslim community is "just one among others" with no special "monopoly on moral judgement", has also brought an "unprecedented degree of moral scrutiny and condemnation from outside" the community. The Western concept of universal human rights propagates the idea that it is both everyone's business how Muslims treat other Muslims (when human rights are violated), and no one's business how people choose to live their lives (when no one's rights are violated).

The growth of the influence of the modern state over education, the economy, military, "intellectual life, culture", etc., has meant forbidding wrong has become "a function of the state apparatus" in states, including some Sunni states, and tendency of (Sunni) scholars to choose between two directions: either "giving ground" to the state and limiting the performance of forbidding; or confronting the state "in the name of Islam".

Changes in Islamic scholarship since Medieval era

Among the things that have changed in the Islamic world from the medieval to the modern era are the divisions among Muslims. Whereas before the twentieth century differences among the Hanafi, and Shafi legal schools, and between the Sunnis, Zaydis, and Ibadi "sectarian scholars" were important; in modern times the significant cleavage in many Islamic legal and political issues (including the forbidding of wrong and commanding of right), is:

- Between Sunni and Twelver Muslims (the Sunni scholastic heritage becoming revered heritage (turāth), while scholars of the Twelver Shia give their scholastic tradition "continuity and adaptation"); the Sunni world being "enormously diverse and confusing" having no one country or event defining the evolution of doctrine, while Twelver Shia thought is dominated by the Iranian Islamic revolution, its supporters and "mild" (clerical) dissidents.
- Between the Islamic modernists and Islamists/fundamentalists/revivalists Muslims; (Note: Cook describes fundamentalism as a "convenient term" without comparing it to similar terms -- Islamism, puritanism, revivalism, etc.) both seeking to revive Islam by restoring it to its "original purity", but modernists thinking this will lead to "living comfortably in the modern world", while fundamentalists work to move Islam "away from, not towards" Western culture.

Some post-medieval Muslims (Rashīd Rīda, d.1935, Khayr al-Din Pasha, d.1878) see the forbidding of wrong in western institutions such as the representative assemblies and free press of republics and constitutional monarchies, whose check on arbitrary power is a way of preventing wrong by rulers. But fundamentalists/Islamist scholars and/or preachers (Sayyid Qutb d.1966, Saʽid Ḥawwa d.1989) see the influence of western concepts mentioned above as a direct challenge to Islam. European countries, for example, being "nothing but wrongs" according to one conservative (Faysal Mawlawi speaking to an audience of Muslims in France). Among the new wrongs fundamentalists have identified in the modern world are cafes, playing cards, cinema, music on radio and television, and the shaving of beards.

Dealing with the power and reach of the modern state there has been a tendency of scholars to choose between two directions: either "giving ground" to the state and limiting the performance of forbidding; or confronting the state "in the name of Islam". Among Shia scholars doctrine has moved "sharply" from quietism to activism in keeping with the Islamic Republic.

On the issue of women's rights, the forbidding of wrong is reconciled with the traditional position of "subordination and seclusion" of women by calling for women to practice the duty at home.

Using the hand in forbidding

Hence some scholars (such as former Mufti of Egypt from 1986 to 1996, Muhammad Sayyid Tantawy) either insist use of "the hand" is reserved for the state—a quietist position that is a "flagrant divergence from the mainstream of traditional Islamic doctrine"—or should only be applied to things and not people. Taking the standard view that the permission of the ruler not is required to use physical force against wrong doers, was Abd al-Qadir Awda and Jalal ad-Din Amri. Both Rashid Rida and Ali ibn Hajj quote approvingly Al-Ghazali's view that Muslims do not need a ruler's approval to form armed bands to combat wrongdoing, Rashid maintaining Al-Ghazali's doctrine "should be written in letters of gold" and memorized by da‘wāt preachers.

Among many contemporary Twelver Shia clerics, "wounding and killing" require the permission of a qualified jurist or specifically the Supreme Leader of the Islamic Republic.

Other issues

One of the original thinkers of Islamism, Sayyid Qutb, argued that forbidding wrong is hopeless/pointless when society has become corrupt, and instead efforts should be directed towards reconstructing Islam and social/political revolution, but this notion has not become "standard fundamentalist doctrine". What has become standard is that forbidding wrong requires "the organized propagation of Islamic values" in today's world.

=== Islamic religious police ===
If the "modern conception" of forbidding wrong is "the organized propagation of Islamic values", then in the late 20th century and/or early twenty first, one important way is by enforcing these values using the state's power of policing. The institution of hisbah has been used in some countries as a rationale for establishing Islamic religious police to stop wrongdoing. Islamic religious police have arisen in some Muslim majority states and regions (Saudi Arabia, Sudan, Aceh province of Indonesia, Afghanistan, Egypt, and Iran).

Between 1996 and 2001 the Taliban in Afghanistan had a Ministry for the Propagation of Virtue and the Prevention of Vice (at different times called a Committee or a department for the propagation ...).

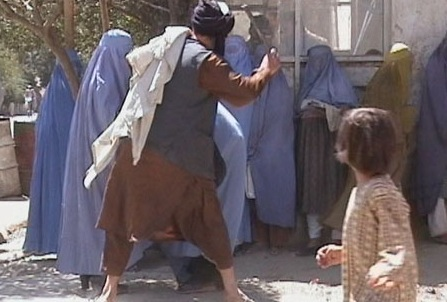
A religious policeman beating a woman for removing her burqa headpiece in public, Kabul, 2001 (image obtained by the Revolutionary Association of the Women of Afghanistan)

In Saudi Arabia, the state authority responsible for hisbah is the Committee for the Promotion of Virtue and the Prevention of Vice, or hay'a. Established in 1976, (or 1940) the committee was known for banning the sale of Pokémon, Barbie dolls, and forcibly prevented school girls from escaping a burning school in 2002 by beating rescuing firemen and locking the school's doors (15 girls died). The once feared Committee lost most of its power by 2016 when it was reduced to submitting reports about infractions to civil authorities.

Iran has had different institutions enforcing proper covering (hijab) for women, preventing the mingling of unrelated men and women without a male guardian (mahram), and other infractions since shortly after the Iranian Revolution. Article 8 of the Constitution of the Islamic Republic of Iran makes enjoining good and forbidding wrong mandatory in accordance with Chapter 9, verse 71 of the Quran.

Hisbah doctrine has been invoked by Islamic prosecutors in cases of apostasy and acts of blasphemy. In Egypt, the Human Rights group Freedom House complains, "hundreds of hisba cases have been registered against writers and activists, often using blasphemy or apostasy as a pretext". In one high-profile case, Nasr Abu Zayd, a Muslim scholar "critical of old and modern Islamic thought" was prosecuted under the statute when his academic work was held to be evidence of apostasy.

== See also ==
- Guidance Patrol, Iran's morality police
- Commanding Right and Forbidding Wrong in Islamic Thought
