= Sven Kalisch =

German academic

- Born: March 21, 1966 (age 60); Hamburg, Germany
- Education: The University of Hamburg
- Occupation: Researcher

Sven Kalisch (also previously Muhammad Sven Kalisch, born March 21, 1966) is a German scholar, formerly an Islamic theologian. He converted to Islam at age 15, became the first in Germany to hold a chair in Islamic theology (at University of Münster), then in 2008 announced that he had come to the conclusion that the Islamic prophet Muhammad probably never existed. Official Islamic groups in Germany have referred to him as an apostate. Germany's Muslim Coordinating Council withdrew from the advisory board of professor Kalisch's centre.

== Biography ==
Kalisch converted from Protestant Christianity to Islam at the age of 15. He adopted the Zaidism branch of Shia Islam. In 1997 he completed his PhD in Islamic jurisprudence. Kalisch was a member of the administrative council of the Germany Muslim Academy and worked for the Islamic Centre Hamburg (Shi'ite).

From 2004 to 2010, he was professor of Islamic Religion at the Centrum für religionsbezogene Studien (CRS) of the University of Münster. Kalisch declared in 2008 and 2009 that he had doubts as to the historicity of Muhammad, as expressed by the "Saarbrücken School", which is part of the greater movement of the Revisionist School of Islamic Studies.

In 2010 Kalisch renounced Islam. His department was then renamed the department for "the intellectual history of the Middle East in the post-antiquity period".

== Publications ==
- Frieden aus der Sicht des Islam. in: Islam im Dialog, Année 1, numéro 4, Winter 2002, S. 13-28.
- Islamische Wirtschaftsethik in einer islamischen und in einer nichtislamischen Umwelt. in: Hans G. Nutzinger (Coll.): Christliche, jüdische und islamische Wirtschaftsethik – Über religiöse Grundlagen wirtschaftlichen Verhaltens in der säkularen Gesellschaft, Marburg 2003, S. 105–129.
- Usul az-Zaidiya wa-nascharāt al-firaq al-islāmiyya. (en arabe, « Les fondamentaux de Zaidiya et les publications des sectes islamiques »), in: Al-Masār, Vol. 5, Issue 2, 2004, p. 27–70.
- Glaube und Gesetz aus Sicht der islamischen Rechtsschulen in: Murest, Multireligiöse Studiengruppe (dir.): Handbuch interreligiöser Dialog. Aus katholischer, evangelischer, sunnitscher und alevitischer Perspektive. Cologne 2006. ISBN 3-00-017959-3
- Islam und Menschenrechte: Betrachtungen zum Verhältnis von Religion und Recht in: Hatem Elliesie (dir.): Islam und Menschenrechte (Islam and Human Rights / الإسلام وحقوق الإنسان), Leipziger Beiträge zur Orientforschung, Band 26, Beiträge zum Islamischen Recht VII, Frankfurt a.M. / New York et al. 2010, S. 49-72. ISBN 978-3-631-57848-3.
