= Narratives of Islamic Origins =

Book by Fred Donner

Narratives of Islamic Origins: The Beginnings of Islamic Historical Writing
- Author: Fred Donner
- Language: English
- Subject: Islam
- Publisher: Darwin Press
- Publication date: 1998
- Publication place: United States
- Media type: Print
- Pages: 358 pages
- ISBN: 0878501274

Narratives of Islamic Origins: The Beginnings of Islamic Historical Writing is a 1998 book by historiographer of early Islam Fred Donner. The work was first published in January 1998 through Darwin Press as the fourteenth volume in the Studies in Late Antiquity and Early Islam series and has since gone through three editions.

== Synopsis ==
The book presents a tradition-critical account of the origins of Islam. It argues that the need to legitimize the community and affirm its standing to the outside world influenced the narrative which became woven into the Arab chronicles in the late 7th to the 10th century.

== Reception ==
The work has received reviews from the Middle East Studies Association Bulletin and Bulletin of the School of Oriental and African Studies, University of London. Narratives of Islamic Origins was also reviewed by the Middle East Journal, which wrote that it "represents a major contribution to Islamic historiography and historical thought." The International Journal of Middle East Studies also commented on the work, stating that it was "important for many reasons, not least because it clarifies the history of the issues that have divided historians, offering pointed critiques of major, particularly recent, works in the debate, while at the same time marking out a position that the author consistently defends in the Introduction and twelve chapters and appendixes."

Islamic scholar Wilferd Madelung has praised the work, stating that "Altogether the book offers a broad range of perceptive observations about the nature of early Islamic historical writing and should contribute to a more positive assessment of its source value for the origins of Islam than has been conveyed by the majority of recent studies."
