= Hagarism =

1977 book by Patricia Crone and Michael Cook

Hagarism: The Making of the Islamic World
- Cover of the first edition
- Authors: Patricia Crone; Michael Cook
- Language: English
- Subject: History of Islam
- Published: 1977
- Publication place: United States
- Media type: Print (Hardcover and Paperback)
- Pages: 277
- ISBN: 978-0521297547

Hagarism: The Making of the Islamic World is a 1977 book about the early history of Islam by the historians Patricia Crone and Michael Cook. Drawing on archaeological evidence and contemporary documents in Arabic, Armenian, Coptic, Greek, Hebrew, Aramaic, Latin and Syriac, Crone and Cook depict an early Islam very different from the traditionally-accepted version derived from Muslim historical accounts.

According to the authors, "Hagarenes" was a term which near-contemporary sources used to name an Arab movement of the 7th century CE whose conquests and resultant caliphate were inspired by Jewish messianism. Crone and Cook contend that an alliance of Arabs and Jews sought to reclaim the Promised Land from the Byzantine Empire, that the Qur'an consists of 8th-century edits of various Judeo-Christian and other Middle-Eastern sources, and that Muhammad was the herald of Umar "the redeemer", a Judaic messiah.

The hypotheses proposed in Hagarism have been widely criticized, and by 2002, the authors had retracted most of their claims. Nevertheless, the book has been hailed as a seminal work in its branch of Islamic historiography. The book questioned prevailing assumptions about traditional sources, proposing new interpretations that opened avenues for research and discussion. It connected the history of early Islam to other areas, from Mediterranean late antiquity to theories of acculturation. Following earlier critical work by Goldziher, Schacht, and Wansbrough, it challenged scholars to use a much wider methodology, including techniques already used in biblical studies. It is thus credited for provoking a major development of the field, even though it might be viewed more as a "what-if" experiment than as a research monograph.

== Synopsis ==
Cook and Crone postulate that "Hagarism" started as a "Jewish messianic movement" to "reestablish Judaism" in the Jewish Holy Land (Palestine), that its adherents were first known as muhajirun (migrants) rather than as Muslims, and that their hijra (migration) was to Jerusalem rather than Medina. Hagarism's members were initially both Jewish and Arab, but the Arabs' increasing success impelled them to break from the Jews around the time of Abd al-Malik ibn Marwan in the late-seventh century. They flirted with Christianity, learning a respect for Jesus as prophet and Mary as Virgin, before asserting an independent Abrahamic monotheist identity. This identity borrowed key concepts from the Jewish breakaway sect of Samaritanism: "the idea of a scripture limited to the Pentateuch, a prophet like Moses (Muhammad), a holy book revealed like the Torah (the Quran), a sacred city (Mecca) with a nearby mountain (Jabal an-Nour) and shrine (the Kaaba) of an appropriate patriarch (Abraham), plus a caliphate modeled on an Aaronid priesthood."

=== Methodology ===
Hagarism begins with the premise that Western historical scholarship on the beginnings of Islam should be based on contemporary historical, archaeological and philological data, as in the study of Judaism and Christianity, rather than on Islamic traditions and later Arabic writings. The Islamic tradition expresses dogma, and gives historically irreconcilable and anachronistic accounts of the Islamic community's past. By relying on contemporary historical, archaeological and philological evidence, stressing non-Muslim sources, the authors attempt to reconstruct and present what they argue is a more historically accurate account of Islam's origins.

=== The term Hagarism ===
According to the authors, Hagarenes is a term used commonly by various sources (Greek Magaritai, Syriac Mahgre or Mahgraye) to describe the 7th-century Arab conquerors. The word was a self-designation of the early Muslim community with a double-meaning. Firstly, it is a cognate of muhājirūn, an Arabic term for those who partake in hijra (exodus). Secondly, it refers to Ishmaelites: descendants of Abraham through Hagar (the Egyptian slave of Sarah, Abraham's wife) and their child Ishmael, in the same way as the Jews claimed descent and their ancestral faith from Abraham through his wife Sarah and their child Isaac. Muhammad would have claimed such descent for Arabs to give them a birthright to the Holy Land and to prepend a monotheist genealogy compatible with Judaism to their pagan ancestral practice (such as sacrifice and circumcision). Hagarism thus refers to this early faith movement. The designation as Muslims and Islam would only come later, after the success of conquests made the duty of hijra obsolete.(pp. 8-9)

=== Origins ===
The authors, interpreting 7th century Syriac, Armenian and Hebrew sources, put forward the hypothesis that Muhammad was alive during the conquest of Palestine (about two years longer than traditionally believed; the caliphate of Abu Bakr was hence a later invention). Muhammad led Jews and Hagarenes (Arabs) united under a faith loosely described as Judeo-Hagarism, as a prophet preaching the coming of a Judaic messiah who would redeem the Promised Land from the Christian Byzantines. This redeemer came in the person of Umar, as suggested by the Aramaic origins of his epithet Al-Faruq (i.e. "the distinguisher [between right and wrong]").

The hijra, the defining idea and religious duty of Hagarenes, thus referred to the emigration from northern Arabia to Palestine (later more generally to conquered territories), not to a single exodus from Mecca to Medina (in particular, "no seventh-century source identifies the Arab era as that of the hijra"). Mecca was only a secondary sanctuary; the initial gathering of Hagarenes and Jews took place rather somewhere in north-west Arabia, north of Medina.

=== Development ===
After the successful conquest of the Holy Land, Hagarenes feared that excessive Judaic influence might result in outright conversion and assimilation. In order to break with Jewish messianism, they recognised Jesus as messiah (though rejecting his crucifixion), which also served to soften the initially hostile attitude towards a growing number of Christian subjects. However, to form a distinct identity, not conflated with either Judaism or Christianity, ancestral practice was reframed as a distinct monotheistic Abrahamic religion. With regard to scripture, the movement took the Samaritan position, defined as accepting the Pentateuch while rejecting prophets. This also served to undermine the legitimacy of the Davidic monarchy, which the Samaritans rejected, as well as of the sanctity of Jerusalem. Instead, Samaritans had had their holy city in Shechem and a temple on the nearby Mount Gerizim; Mecca and its nearby mountain were contrived as parallel to these.

To combine the Abrahamic, Christian, and Samaritan elements, the role of Muhammad was recast as that of a prophet parallel to Moses, bringing a new scriptural revelation. The Quran was expeditiously collected from earlier disparate Hagarene writings, possibly heavily edited into its complete form by al-Hajjaj (that is, in the last decade of the 7th century rather than in the middle, under Uthman (caliph from 644 to 656), as traditionally believed; see Origin according to academic historians).

The political theory of early Islam stemmed from two sources. Firstly, the Samaritan high-priesthood, which joins political and religious authority and legitimises it on basis of religious knowledge and genealogy. Secondly, a resurgence of Judaic influences in Babylonian Iraq, which led to the reassertion of messianism in the form of mahdism, especially in Shia Islam. The identification as Hagarenes was replaced with the Samaritan notion of "Islam" (understood as "submission" or as "a covenant of peace"), its adherents becoming Muslims.

=== Consolidation in Iraq ===
The transition to a confident, recognisably Islamic identity, with its various borrowings assimilated, occurred in the late-7th century, during the reign of Abd al-Malik (caliph from 685 to 705). However, its evolution continued. As power transferred from Syria to Iraq, Islam incorporated the rabbinical culture of Babylonian Judaism: religious law practised by a learned laity and based on oral traditions.

In the second half of the eighth century, the early Muʿtazila, simultaneously with Karaite Judaism, rejected all oral traditions, leading to a failed attempt to base law on Greek rationalism. In response, Islamic scholars followed Shafi'i in gathering chains of authorities (isnads) to support traditions historically item by item. This original solution finalised the independence of Islam from Judaism.

Part I of Crone and Cook's book ends by considering the peculiar state in which the Hagarenes found themselves: their own success pushed them away from the sanctuaries of Jerusalem and Mecca to Babylonia, as finalised by the Abbasid Revolution of 747 to 750; Umar had already lived and there was no lost land or freedom to hope for. This led Sunni religious politics into quietism under a desanctified state, contrasted only with "Sufi resignation".

=== Wider context ===
The remainder of the book, Parts II and III, discusses later developments and the larger context in which Islam originated: the Late Antique Near East, and relates it to theoretical themes of cultural history. This contrasts with the usual setting, focusing almost exclusively on Arabian indigenous polytheistic beliefs (jahiliyya).

== Reception ==
The thesis of Hagarism is not widely accepted, although it won Crone praise for "erudition and lucid analysis." Crone and Cook's work was part of revisionist history arising from several scholars associated with the University of London's School of Oriental and African Studies (SOAS), beginning in the 1970s. They introduced methods from biblical studies as a new way of analyzing the history of the Koran and Islam, for instance, the use of contemporary texts in languages other than that used in the holy text, and incorporating evidence from archeology and linguistics.

Hagarism was acknowledged as raising some interesting questions and being a fresh approach in its reconstruction of early Islamic history, but it was described by Josef van Ess as an experiment. He argued that a “refutation is perhaps unnecessary since the authors make no effort to prove it (the hypothesis of the book) in detail ... Where they are only giving a new interpretation of well-known facts, this is not decisive. But where the accepted facts are consciously put upside down, their approach is disastrous."

Jack Tannous, associate professor at Princeton, called the book "brilliantly provocative" in 2011. He commented:

Apart from Internet enthusiasts and religiously-motivated polemicists, nobody today, not even Cook and Crone themselves, believes that the picture of early Islam put forth in Hagarism is an accurate one. But the legacy of Hagarism has endured, for in one thin little volume, Cook and Crone put their fingers on a nagging problem in an electric way. ... As a book making a specific argument, Hagarism was ultimately a failure, but in its stimulus of further research, writing, debate, and especially by challenging Islamicists to look beyond the confines of Arabic sources to the rich literatures of the Middle East that existed before, during, and after the rise of Islam, Hagarism was one of those rare books that changed a field.

Stephen Humphreys, professor at UCSB, wrote in his analytic review of the historiography of early Islam:

Unsurprisingly, the Crone-Cook interpretation has failed to win general acceptance among Western Orientalists, let alone Muslim scholars. However, their approach does squarely confront the disparities between early Arabic tradition on the Conquest period and the accounts given by Eastern Christian and Jewish sources. The rhetoric of these authors may be an obstacle for many readers, for their argument is conveyed through a dizzying and unrelenting array of allusions, metaphors, and analogies. More substantively, their use (or abuse) of the Greek and Syriac sources has been sharply criticized. In the end, perhaps we ought to use Hagarism more as a 'what-if' exercise than as a research monograph, but it should not be ignored.

— Islamic History: A Framework for Inquiry

David Waines, professor at Lancaster University, states:

The Crone-Cook theory has been almost universally rejected. The evidence offered by the authors is far too tentative and conjectural (and possibly contradictory) to conclude that Arab-Jewish relations were as intimate as they would wish them to have been. ... The book, nevertheless, has raised serious and legitimate questions by emphasizing the difficulty in employing the Muslim sources for a reconstruction of Islamic origins.

— An Introduction to Islam

According to Liaquat Ali Khan who claimed to have interviewed Patricia Crone and Michael Cook, both of them would have later suggested that the central thesis of the book was mistaken because the evidence they had to support the thesis was not sufficient or internally consistent enough. Patricia Crone would have suggested to him that the book was “a graduate essay" and "a hypothesis," not "a conclusive finding", but they did nothing to acknowledge it publicly. Khan wrote that "Cook and Crone have made no manifest effort to repudiate their juvenile findings in the book. The authors admitted to me that they had not done it and cater no plans to do so."

=== Scholarly reviews ===
John Wansbrough, who had mentored the authors, reviewed the book, specifically the first part. He begins by praising the book claiming, "the authors' erudition is extraordinary their industry everywhere evident, their prose ebullient." But, he says that "most, if not all, [of the sources] have been or can be challenged on suspicion of inauthenticity" and that "the material is upon occasion misleadingly represented ... My reservations here, and elsewhere in this first part of the book, turn upon what I take to be the authors' methodological assumptions, of which the principal must be that a vocabulary of motives can be freely extrapolated from a discrete collection of literary stereotypes composed by alien and mostly hostile observers, and thereupon employed to describe, even interpret, not merely the overt behaviour but also intellectual and spiritual development of the helpless and mostly innocent actors. Where even the sociologist fears to tread, the historian ought not with impunity be permitted to go."

Robert Bertram Serjeant wrote that Hagarism is "not only bitterly anti-Islamic in tone, but anti-Arabian. Its superficial fancies are so ridiculous that at first one wonders if it is just a 'leg pull', pure 'spoof'."

Eric Manheimer commented that, "The research on Hagarism is thorough, but this reviewer feels that the conclusions drawn lack balance. The weights on the scales tip too easily toward the hypercritical side, tending to distract from what might have been an excellent study in comparative religion."

Oleg Grabar described Hagarism as a "brilliant, fascinating, original, arrogant, highly debatable book" and writes that "the authors' fascination with lapidary formulas led them to cheap statements or to statements which require unusual intellectual gymnastics to comprehend and which become useless, at best cute" and that "... the whole construction proposed by the authors lacks entirely in truly historical foundations" but also praised the authors for trying to "relate the Muslim phenomenon to broad theories of acculturation and historical change."

Michael G. Morony remarked that "Despite a useful bibliography, this is a thin piece of Kulturgeschichte full of glib generalizations, facile assumptions, and tiresome jargon. More argument than evidence, it suffers all the problems of intellectual history, including reification and logical traps."

Fred Donner, reviewing Hagarism in 2006, viewed the book as a "wake-up call": despite initial repudiation, it set a milestone by pointing out that scholars need to "consider a much more varied body of source material than most were used to using, or trained to use." On the other hand, he criticized the book's indiscriminate use of non-Muslim sources and the "labyrinthine" arguments incomprehensible even to many who had strong specialist training.

=== Follow-up work ===
Robert G. Hoyland characterized Hagarism as evolving into a wider inter-disciplinary and literary approach, and said that additional studies would be published in the Studies in Late Antiquity and Early Islam (SLAEI Series) in which his book appears. Since then the "SUNY Series in Near Eastern Studies" has also published a selection of authors who are continuing to produce work related to a modified form of this theory.

== See also ==
- Historiography of early Islam
- Geschichte des Qorāns (History of the Quran)— book by Theodor Noldeke
- Muslim Studies (book) — by Ignaz Goldziher
- Revisionist school of Islamic studies
- Seeing Islam As Others Saw It – a book by Robert G. Hoyland, former student of Patricia Crone, providing an extensive collection of contemporary non-Muslim sources that give accounts of the formative period of Islam.
- What Did Muhammad Borrow from Judaism? — a book by Abraham Geiger
