= What Did Muhammad Borrow from Judaism? =

First work of modern Quranic studies

Was hat Mohammed aus dem Judenthume aufgenommen? (What Did Muhammad Borrow from Judaism?) is a foundational work of modern Quranic studies by Abraham Geiger. In 1898, F.M. Young translated it into English under the title Judaism and Islam: A Prize Essay. Originally written in Latin to earn Geiger a doctorate at the University of Marburg, it was soon republished in German in 1833. Many consider this to be the first work of the field of modern Quranic studies and it continues to be cited in new studies.

Geiger was the first to avoid earlier tendencies among Western authors to ascribe deceptive motives to Muhammad when studying the Quran.

== Summary ==
The primary objective of this book was to demonstrate that the Quranic reception of biblical narratives did not occur directly via a reception of the books of the canonical Bible, but through parabiblical intermediaries such as midrash (traditional Jewish exegesis of biblical texts). Geiger, being a rabbinic scholar, focused on the Qurans correspondence with the Jewish literary tradition. For example, Geiger demonstrated that numerous basic terms in Islam, including ark, Eden, hell, divine presence, rabbinic scholars, Sabbath, and more, are of Jewish origins. The basic doctrine of God's unity also goes back to Judaism (as opposed to Christianity). By contrast, Geiger believed that the influence of Christianity in Islamic origins and the Quran was minimal. Geiger also sought to explain discrepancies between closely related traditions found in the Quran and Jewish tradition by recourse to a potentially flawed transmission that the Jewish narrative had undergone as it entered the milieu of Muhammad. This is possible because for Geiger, the medium of transmission of these narratives into Muhammad's environment was oral as opposed to written. However, not all discrepancies were the product of flawed transmissions. Some were intentional. In this direction, Geiger believed that Muhammad sought to distance himself legalistically from Judaism in several ways, like in terms of dietary and divorce laws.

Geiger's broad approach of tracing the origins of Quranic tradition from Jewish traditions continued in the works of Hartwig Hirschfeld, Israel Schapiro, and others, before finally culminating in Heinrich Speyer's Die biblischen Erzählungen im Qoran, published in 1931, and representing when Geiger's work had finally been superseded.
