= Fred Donner =

American historian and scholar of Islam (born 1945)

Fred McGraw Donner
- Born: 1945 (age 80–81); Washington, D.C., U.S.
- Education: Princeton University
- Known for: Islamic Studies; Quranic (Islamic) studies; scriptural exegesis; scholarship on Islamic origins
- Awards: Guggenheim Fellow (2007); Member of the Tunisian Academy of Sciences, Letters, and Arts
- Scientific career
- Fields: Islamic Studies
- Workplaces: University of Chicago; Yale University; University of Erlangen-Nuremberg

Fred McGraw Donner (born 1945) is a scholar of Islam and Peter B. Ritzma Professor of Near Eastern History at the University of Chicago. He has published several books about early Islamic history.

== Biography ==
=== Early life and studies ===
Donner was born in Washington, D.C., and grew up in Basking Ridge, New Jersey, where he attended public schools. In 1968 he completed his Bachelor of Arts degree in Oriental Studies at Princeton University, having interrupted his studies from 1966 to 1967 to pursue the study of Arabic at the Middle East Centre for Arab Studies (MECAS) in the village of Shimlan, Lebanon. From 1968 to 1970 he served with the U. S. Army, seeing duty with U. S. Army Security Agency in Herzogenaurach, Germany in 1969–1970. He then studied oriental philology for a year (1970–1971) at the Friedrich-Alexander Universität in Erlangen, Germany, before returning to Princeton for doctoral work. Donner received his PhD in Near Eastern Studies from Princeton in 1975.

=== Career ===
Donner taught Middle Eastern history in the History Department at Yale University from 1975 to 1982 before taking his position at the University of Chicago in 1982 (The Oriental Institute and Department of Near Eastern Languages and Civilizations). He served as chairman of his Department (1997–2002) and as Director of the university's Center for Middle Eastern Studies (2009–present).

In 2007, he was awarded a Guggenheim Fellowship to examine Arabic papyri from the first Islamic century (seventh century CE) at collections in Paris, Vienna, Oxford, and Heidelberg.

==== Positions held ====
Donner was President of Middle East Medievalists (MEM; homepage here) from 1992 until 1994 and served as editor of the journal Al-Usur al-Wusta: The Bulletin of Middle East Medievalists from 1992 until 2011.

Donner was President of the Middle East Studies Association of North America (MESA). He has been a member of MESA since 1975, served an earlier term on MESA's Board of Directors (1992–1994) and was awarded MESA's Jere L. Bacharach Service Award in 2008.

A part of the MEM and MESA, Donner has also been a long-term member of The American Oriental Society.

== Research ==
Donner's book The Early Islamic Conquests was published in 1981 by Princeton University Press. He has also published a translation of a volume of the history of al-Tabari in 1993.

In Narratives of Islamic Origins (1998), Donner argues for an early date for the Quranic text. He responds in particular to the theory of late canonisation of the Qur'an proposed by John Wansbrough and Yehuda D. Nevo. The book attempts to explain how concerns for legitimation in the developing Islamic community shaped the themes that are the focus of Islamic historical writing, particularly the themes of prophecy, community, hegemony, and leadership.

Donner's book Muhammad and the Believers: At the Origins of Islam, an account of the early years of the spiritual movement that would come to be known as Islam, was published by Harvard University Press in May 2010. Donner's main argument is that what came to be called Islam began as a monotheistic "Believers' movement" inaugurated by Muhammad, which included righteous Christians and Jews as well as those monotheists who followed the teachings of the Qur'an. Only under the rule of Abd al-Malik ibn Marwan (685–705) did Islam begin to separate from Christians and Jews. This argument was first presented at the late antiquity and Early Islam workshop in London in 1993, and published in an article.

== Reception ==
Donner's book The Early Islamic Conquests (1981) has been described as "magisterial" and "a major contribution to the understanding of early Islamic history" (International Journal of Middle East Studies). It is used as a set text for several university courses.

Donner's Muhammad and the Believers has been described as "learned and brilliantly original" in a New York Times review.

Orientalist Patricia Crone was critical of the book: she wrote on Tablet that the only direct evidence for Donner's central thesis of an ecumenical early Islam comes from several Quranic verses, while the rest is based on conjecture. According to Crone, The New York Times review of Donner's book indicates that his account of a "nice, tolerant, and open" Islam appeals to American liberals, and it may perform a useful role in educating the broader public, but as a scholarly work "it leaves something to be desired". Other academic reviews have characterized the book as "provocative and largely convincing" and as "a plausible and compelling, if necessarily somewhat speculative, alternate account of the emergence of Islam".

== Awards ==
Donner received a 1994 Quantrell Award for Excellence in Undergraduate Teaching. From 2007 to 2008, Donner held a Guggenheim Fellowship. Donner was appointed a life member of the Scientific Committee of the Tunisian Academy of Sciences, Letters, and Arts in 2012.

== Bibliography ==
- The Early Islamic Conquests (Princeton University Press; 1981) ISBN 0-691-05327-8
- History of the Prophets and Kings (Vol. 10): The Conquest of Arabia (State University of New York Press; 1993) ISBN 0-7914-1072-2 (translation)
- Narratives of Islamic Origins (Darwin Press; 1998) ISBN 0-87850-127-4
- Muhammad and the Believers: At the Origins of Islam (Harvard University Press; 2010) ISBN 978-0-674-05097-6
- Antoine Borrut; Fred Donner; Touraj Daryaee; Muriel Debié; Sidney H. Griffith; Wadād Qāḍī; Milka Levy-Rubin; Suzanne Pinckney Stetkevych; Donald S. Whitcomb; Luke B. Yarbrough. Christians and Others in the Umayyad State (Institute for the Study of Ancient Cultures, West Asia & North Africa, 2016) ISBN 978-1614910312
- Fred M. Donner, ed. (15 May 2017). The Articulation of Early Islamic State Structures. Routledge. ISBN 978-1-351-89449-4.
