= Michael Cook (historian) =

British historian (born 1940)

Michael Cook FBA
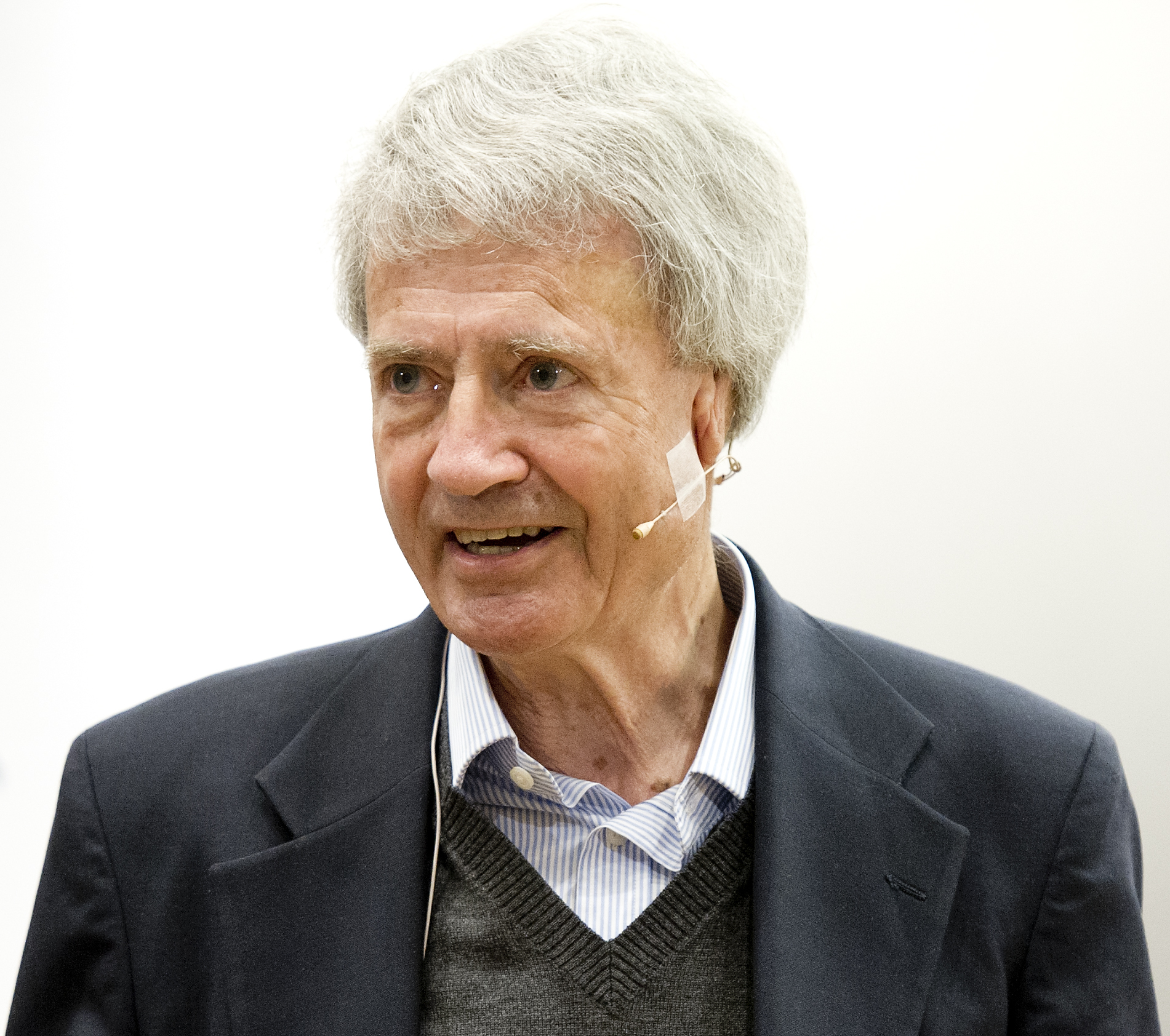
- Professor Cook during the Holberg Symposium, 2014
- Born: Michael Allan Cook; 1940 (age 85–86)

Academic background
- Education: King's College, Cambridge; SOAS University of London

Academic work
- Institutions: School of Oriental and African Studies, University of London; Princeton University
- Notable works: Hagarism (1977); Commanding Right and Forbidding Wrong in Islamic Thought (2000)
- Website: nes.princeton.edu/people/michael-cook

Michael Allan Cook FBA (born 1940) is a British historian and scholar of Islamic history. Cook is the general editor of The New Cambridge History of Islam.

== Biography ==
Michael Cook developed an early interest in Turkey and Ottoman history and studied history and oriental studies at King's College, Cambridge (1959–63) and did postgraduate studies at the School of Oriental and African Studies (SOAS) of the University of London (1963–66). He was lecturer in Economic History with reference to the Middle East at SOAS (1966–84) and reader in the History of the Near and Middle East (1984–86). In 1986, he was appointed Cleveland E. Dodge Professor of Near Eastern Studies at Princeton University. Since 2007, he has been Class of 1943 University Professor of Near Eastern Studies. He was a Guggenheim Fellow in Spring 1990.

== Research ==
In Hagarism: The Making of the Islamic World (1977), Cook and his associate Patricia Crone provided a new analysis of early Islamic history by studying the only surviving contemporary accounts of the rise of Islam. They fundamentally questioned the historicity of the Islamic traditions about the beginnings of Islam. Thus they tried to produce the picture of Islam's beginnings only from non-Arabic sources. By studying the only surviving contemporary accounts of the rise of Islam, which were written in Armenian, Greek, Aramaic, and Syriac by witnesses, they reconstructed a significantly different story of Islam's beginnings, compared with the story known from the Islamic traditions. Cook and Crone claimed to be able to explain exactly how Islam came into being by the fusion of various near eastern civilizations under Arabic leadership. Later, Michael Cook refrained from this attempt of a detailed reconstruction of Islam's beginnings, and concentrated on Islamic ethics and law. Patricia Crone later suggested that the book was "a graduate essay" and "a hypothesis," not "a conclusive finding."

In his work Commanding Right and Forbidding Wrong in Islamic Thought (Cambridge, 2000), Michael Cook, in the chapter on the doctrine of al-Amr bi'l-Maʿrūf wa'l-Nahy ʿan il-Munkar among the Ibāḍīs, makes a comparison between western and eastern Ibāḍism and with the doctrines of the other Islamic sects and schools. The eastern and western Ibāḍīs represent two distinct historical communities with largely separate literary heritages, at least until, roughly, the beginning of the twentieth century. There are occasional links between them: one shared literary borrowing (Māwardī, Ghazālī), the unusual doctrine that the verbal obligation does not lapse when the offender will not listen, the equally unusual interest in women as performers of the duty. Differences are likely to reflect the very different political histories of the two wings of the sect. In Oman, the resilience of the Imamate down the centuries finds obvious and direct expression in the frequency with which the Omani sources link forbidding wrong with this institution. In the West, where the vacuum left by the disappearance of the Imamate was filled in part by clerical organisation and authority, the scholars seem to have become less cautious about the role of the individual performer. Comparing the Ibāḍī doctrine of forbidding wrong with the doctrines of other Islamic sects and schools, the significant point is that, left aside the close association of forbidding wrong with righteous rebellion and state-formation which the Ibāḍīs share with the Zaydīs, Ibāḍī views do not in any systematic way diverge from those of the Islamic mainstream.

Cook is also known for synthetic works for a general audience, including The Koran: A Very Short Introduction (Oxford, 2000) and A Brief History of the Human Race (Norton, 2003). Cook served as general editor of The New Cambridge History of Islam, which covers fourteen centuries of Muslim history. This six-volume project was selected as winner of the 2011 Waldo G. Leland Prize for the "most outstanding reference tool in the field of history" published between 1 May 2006, and 30 April 2011.

== Criticism ==
Robert Bertram Serjeant described Hagarism as "bitterly anti-Islamic" and "anti-Arabian" in 1978. Cook's 2014 work, Ancient Religions, Modern Politics, has been criticized by Duke Religion scholar, Bruce Lawrence, as an "anti-Islam manifesto."

Cook addresses his approach to navigating the politics of scholarship on Islam in a video for the Nicholas D. Chabraja Center for Historical Studies. In his words, he claims that "I personally see my academic role not as being anybody's advocate for or against. I hold onto a kind of ideal of objectivity, which I am sure I don't fully realize...I didn't like the philo-Islamic pull and I don't like the anti-Islamic pull. They are kind of a distraction from scholarship."

== Recognition ==
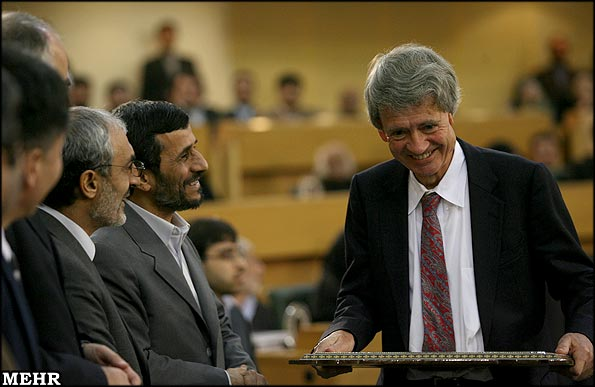
Cook receiving the Farabi International Award in 2008, Iranian president Mahmoud Ahmadinejad presiding

- In 2001 he was chosen to be a member of the American Philosophical Society.
- In 2001 he received the Albert Hourani Book Award
- In 2002 he received the prestigious $1.5 million Distinguished Achievement Award from the Mellon Foundation for significant contribution to humanities research.
- In 2004 he was chosen to be a member of the American Academy of Arts and Sciences.
- In 2006 he won Howard T. Behrman Award for Distinguished Achievement in the Humanities at Princeton.
- In 2008 he won Farabi Award in the Humanities and Islamic Studies.
- In 2013 he and Patricia Crone were awarded an honorary doctorate at Leiden University.
- In 2014 he won the Holberg Prize
- In 2019 he won the Balzan Prize

== Works ==
- Hagarism: The Making of the Islamic World, 1977, with Patricia Crone.
- Early Muslim Dogma: A Source-Critical Study, 1981.
- Muhammad (Past Masters), 1983.
- The Koran: A Very Short Introduction, 2000.
- Commanding Right and Forbidding Wrong in Islamic Thought, 2001 (Winner of the Albert Hourani Book Award).
- Forbidding Wrong in Islam: An Introduction (Themes in Islamic History), 2003.
- A Brief History of the Human Race, New York 2003.
- Studies in the Origins of Early Islamic Culture and Tradition, 2004.
- (ed.): The New Cambridge History of Islam, Cambridge: Cambridge University Press 2010. (six vols, 4,929pp)
- Ancient Religions, Modern Politics: The Islamic Case in Comparative Perspective, 2014
- A History of the Muslim World: From Its Origins to the Dawn of Modernity, 2024
