= Historiography of early Islam =

The historiography of early Islam is the collection of religious and secular literature on the early history of Islam during the 7th century, from Muhammad's first revelations in 610 until the disintegration of the Rashidun Caliphate in 661, and arguably throughout the 8th century and the duration of the Umayyad Caliphate, terminating in the incipient Islamic Golden Age around the beginning of the 9th century.

While classical Islamic scholarship developed methodologies such as the science of biography and the "chain of imputation" to evaluate the reliability -usually varying according to religious sects- of these manaqib narratives, prominent figures like Ibn Khaldun introduced critical historiographical methods, emphasizing the importance of context and the systematic evaluation of historical data. On the other hand modern Western scholarship seeks to support traditional narratives with objective data and external sources.(see: Historical criticism, Hermeneutics)

== Primary sources ==
=== 7th-century Islamic sources ===
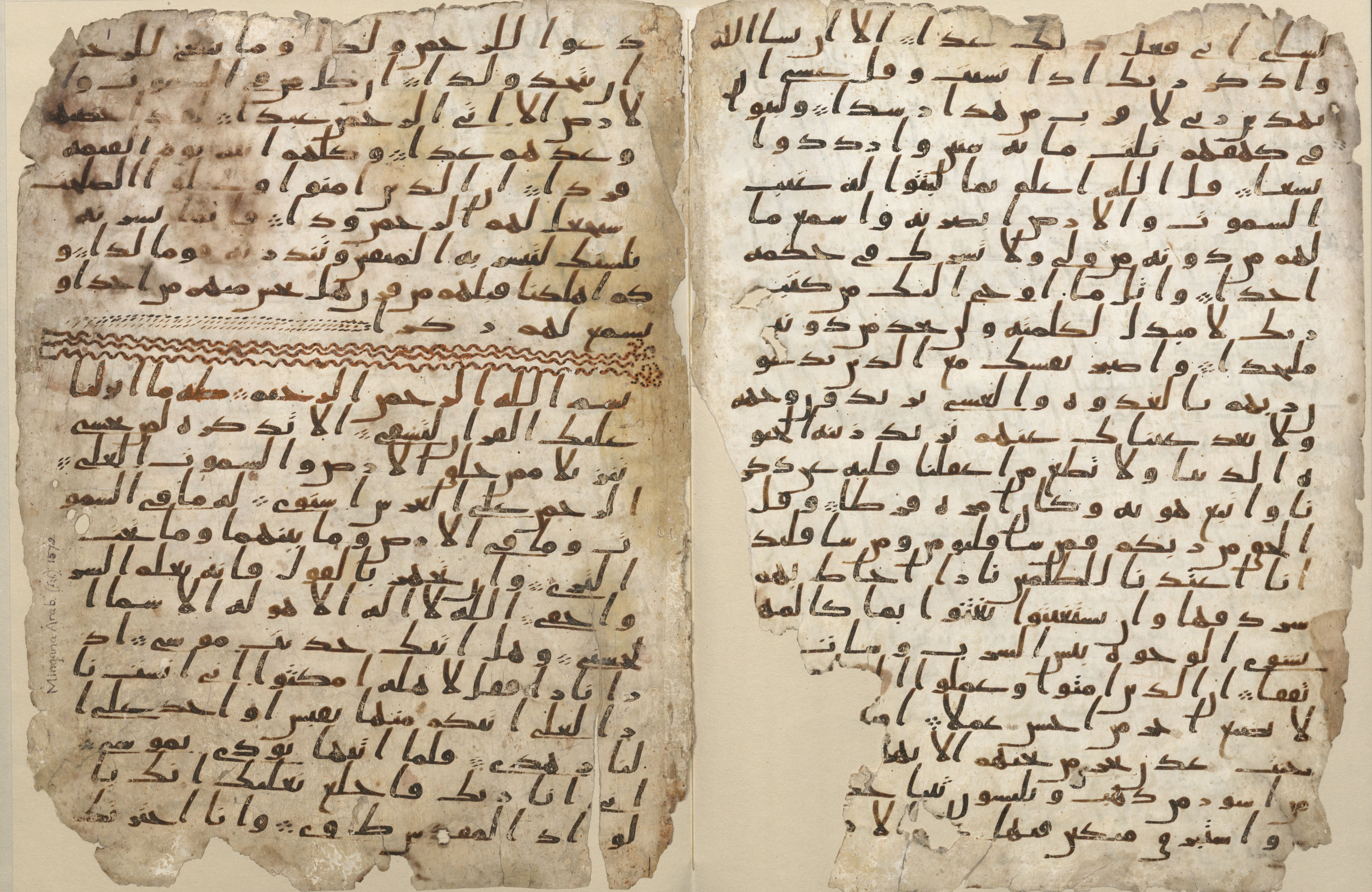
The Birmingham Quran manuscript (c. 568–645 CE)

- Birmingham Quran manuscript. Between c. 568 and 645 CE
- Tübingen fragment. Radiocarbon dated between c. 649 and 675 CE (though written in the post-8th century Kufic script)
- Sanaa manuscript. Between c. 578 and 669 CE
- Qur'anic Mosaic on the Dome of the Rock. 692 CE
- The Book of Sulaym ibn Qays. The work is an early Shia hadith collection, attributed to Sulaym ibn Qays (death 694–714), and it is often recognised as the earliest such collection. There is a manuscript of the work dating to the 10th century. Some Shia scholars are dubious about the authenticity of some features of the book, and Western scholars are almost unanimously sceptical concerning the work, with most placing its initial composition in the eighth or ninth century. The work is generally considered pseudepigraphic by modern scholars.

=== 7th-century non-Islamic sources ===
There are numerous early references to Islam in non-Islamic sources. Many have been collected in historiographer Robert G. Hoyland's compilation Seeing Islam As Others Saw It. One of the first books to analyze these works was Hagarism authored by Michael Cook and Patricia Crone. Hagarism contends that looking at the early non-Islamic sources provides a much different picture of early Islamic history than the later Islamic sources do. The date of composition of some of the early non-Islamic sources is controversial. Hagarism has been widely dismissed by academics as being too conjectural in its hypothesis and biased in its sources.

- 634 Doctrina Iacobi
- 636 Fragment on the Arab Conquests
- 639 Sophronius, Patriarch of Jerusalem
- 640 Thomas the Presbyter
- 643 PERF 558
- 644 Coptic Apocalypse of Pseudo-Shenute
- 648 Life of Gabriel of Qartmin
- 650 Fredegar
- 655 Pope Martin I
- 659 Isho'yahb III of Adiabene
- 660 Sebeos, Bishop of the Bagratunis
- 660 Khuzistan Chronicle
- 662 Maximus the Confessor
- 665 Benjamin I
- 670 Arculf, a pilgrim
- 676 Synod of Giwargis I
- 680 George of Resh'aina
- 680 The Secrets of Rabbi Simon ben Yohai
- 680 Bundahishn
- 681 Trophies of Damascus
- 687 Athanasius of Balad, Patriarch of Antioch
- 687 John bar Penkaye
- 690 Syriac Apocalypse of Pseudo-Methodius
- 692 Syriac Apocalypse of Pseudo-Ephraem
- 694 John of Nikiu

=== Epigraphy ===
According to archaeologists Yehuda D. Nevo and Judith Koren, there are thousands of pagan and monotheist epigraphs or rock inscriptions throughout the Arabian peninsula and in the Syro-Jordanian desert immediately north, many of them dating from the 7th and 8th century. According to historian Leor Halevi, Muslim tombstones from 30-40 AH / 650-660 CE named Allah (Arabic for God) and referred to the names of the months of the Hijri calendar, but showed few other indications of Islamization. From 70-110 AH/690-730 CE, Muslim tombstones began to reveal deeper signs of Islamization, invoking Muhammad and quoted from the Quran.

Some epigraphs found from the first century of Islam include:

- Analysis of a sandstone inscription found in 2008 determined that it read: "In the name of Allah/ I, Zuhayr, wrote (this) at the time 'Umar died/year four/And twenty." It is worthwhile pointing out that caliph Umar bin al-Khattāb died on the last night of the month of Dhūl-Hijjah of the year 23 AH, and was buried next day on the first day of Muharram of the new year 24 AH/644 CE. Thus the date mentioned in the inscription (above) conforms to the established and known date of the death of ʿUmar bin al-Khattāb.
- Jerusalem 32 – An Inscription unearthed at the south-west corner of the Ḥaram al-Sharīf in Jerusalem during excavations conducted by Professor Benjamin Mazar of the Hebrew University of Jerusalem in 1968 from 32 AH / 652 CE mentions, "In the name of Allah, the Beneficent, the Merciful ... the protection of Allah and the guarantee of His Messenger ... And witnessed it ʿAbd al-Raḥmān bin ʿAwf al-Zuhrī, and Abū ʿUbaydah bin al-Jarrāḥ and its writer—Muʿāwiya ... the year thirty two"
- An Inscription, at Taymāʾ, Saudi Arabia, c. 36 AH / 656 CE reads, "I am Qays, the scribe of Abū Kutayr. Curse of Allah on [those] who murdered ʿUthmān ibn ʿAffān and [those who] have led to the killing without mercy." Greek Inscription In The Baths Of Hammat Gader, 42 AH / 662-63 CE mentions, "In the days of the servant of God Muʿāwiya (abdalla Maavia), the commander of the faithful (amēra almoumenēn) the hot baths of the people there were saved and rebuilt."

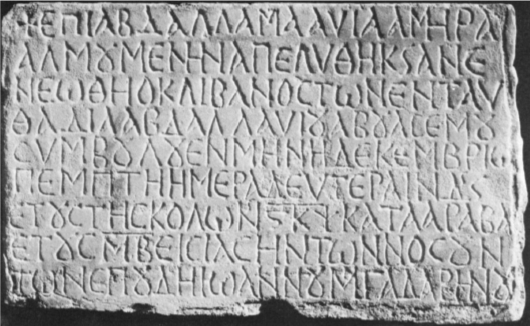
Greek inscription in the baths of Hammat Gader, 42 AH / 662–663 CE mentioning Caliph Muawiyah

- Tombstone of a woman named ʿAbāssa Bint Juraij, kept in Museum of Islamic Art Cairo, from 71 AH / 691 CE mentions,"In the name of God, the Merciful, the Compassionate. The greatest misfortune for the people of Islām (ahl al-Islām) is the death of Muḥammad the Prophet, Peace be upon him."
- An Inscription at Ḥuma al-Numoor, near Ṭāʾif from 78 AH / 697–698 CE mentions, "This was written in the year the Masjid al-Ḥarām was built in the seventy eighth year."

=== Religious sciences of biography, hadith, and Isnad ===
Muslims believe that the historical traditions first began their development in the early 7th century with the reconstruction of Muhammad's life following his death. Because narratives regarding Muhammad and his companions came from various sources and a great many contradicted each other, it was necessary to verify which sources were more reliable. In order to evaluate these sources, various methodologies were developed, such as the "science of biography", "science of hadith" and "Isnad" (chain of transmission). These methodologies were later applied to other historical figures in the Muslim world.

Ilm ar-Rijal (Arabic) is the "science of biography" especially as practiced in Islam, where it was first applied to the sira, the life of the prophet of Islam, Muhammad, and then the lives of the four Rightly Guided Caliphs who expanded Islamic dominance rapidly. Since validating the sayings of Muhammad is a major study ("Isnad"), accurate biography has always been of great interest to Muslim biographers, who accordingly attempted to sort out facts from accusations, bias from evidence, etc. The earliest surviving Islamic biography is Ibn Ishaq's Sirat Rasul Allah, written in the 8th century, but known to us only from later quotes and recensions (9th–10th century).

The "science of hadith" is the process that Muslim scholars use to evaluate hadith. The classification of Hadith into Sahih (sound), Hasan (good) and Da'if (weak) was firmly established by Ali ibn al-Madini (778CE/161AH – 849CE/234AH). Later, al-Madini's student Muhammad al-Bukhari (810–870) authored a collection that he believed contained only Sahih hadith, which is now known as the Sahih Bukhari. Al-Bukhari's historical methods of testing hadiths and isnads is seen as the beginning of the method of citation and a precursor to the scientific method. I. A. Ahmad writes:

"The vagueness of ancient historians about their sources stands in stark contrast to the insistence that scholars such as Bukhari and Muslim manifested in knowing every member in a chain of transmission and examining their reliability. They published their findings, which were then subjected to additional scrutiny by future scholars for consistency with each other and the Qur'an."

Other famous Muslim historians who studied the science of biography or science of hadith included Urwah ibn Zubayr (died 712), Wahb ibn Munabbih (died 728), Ibn Ishaq (died 767), al-Waqidi (745–822), Ibn Hisham (died 834), al-Maqrizi (1364–1442), and Ibn Hajar Asqalani (1372–1449), among others.

=== Historiography, cultural history, and philosophy of history ===
The first detailed studies on the subject of historiography itself and the first critiques on historical methods appeared in the works of the Arab Muslim historian and historiographer Ibn Khaldun (1332–1406), who is regarded as the father of historiography, cultural history, and the philosophy of history, especially for his historiographical writings in the Muqaddimah (Latinized as Prolegomena) and Kitab al-Ibar (Book of Advice). His Muqaddimah also laid the groundwork for the observation of the role of state, communication, propaganda and systematic bias in history, and he discussed the rise and fall of civilizations.

Franz Rosenthal wrote in the History of Muslim Historiography:

"Muslim historiography has at all times been united by the closest ties with the general development of scholarship in Islam, and the position of historical knowledge in MusIim education has exercised a decisive influence upon the intellectual level of historicai writing....The Muslims achieved a definite advance beyond previous historical writing in the sociology

— sociological understanding of history and the systematisation of historiography. The development of modern historical writing seems to have gained considerably in speed and substance through the utilization of a Muslim Literature which enabled western historians, from the seventeenth century on, to see a large section of the world through foreign eyes. The Muslim historiography helped indirectly and modestly to shape present day historical thinking."

In the Muqaddimah, Ibn Khaldun warned of seven mistakes that he thought that historians regularly committed. In this criticism, he approached the past as strange and in need of interpretation. The originality of Ibn Khaldun was to claim that the cultural difference of another age must govern the evaluation of relevant historical material, to distinguish the principles according to which it might be possible to attempt the evaluation, and lastly, to feel the need for experience, in addition to rational principles, in order to assess a culture of the past. Ibn Khaldun often criticized "idle superstition and uncritical acceptance of historical data." As a result, he introduced a scientific method to the study of history, which was considered something "new to his age", and he often referred to it as his "new science", now associated with historiography. His historical method also laid the groundwork for the observation of the role of state, communication, propaganda and systematic bias in history, and he is thus considered to be the "father of historiography" or the "father of the philosophy of history".

=== World history ===
Muhammad ibn Jarir al-Tabari (838–923) is known for writing a detailed and comprehensive chronicle of Mediterranean and Middle Eastern history in his History of the Prophets and Kings in 915. Abu al-Hasan 'Alī al-Mas'ūdī (896–956), known as the "Herodotus of the Arabs", was the first to combine history and scientific geography in a large-scale work, Muruj adh-dhahab wa ma'adin al-jawahir (The Meadows of Gold and Mines of Gems), a book on world history.

Until the 10th century, history most often meant political and military history, but this was not so with Central Asian historian Biruni (973–1048). In his Kitab fi Tahqiq ma l'il-Hind (Researches on India), he did not record political and military history in any detail, but wrote more on India's cultural, scientific, social and religious history. Along with his Researches on India, Biruni discussed more on his idea of history in his chronological work The Chronology of the Ancient Nations.

=== Famous Muslim historians ===
- Urwah ibn Zubayr (died 712)
  - Hadith of Umar's speech of forbidding Mut'ah
- Ibn Shihab al-Zuhri (died 742)
  - Hadith of Umar's speech of forbidding Mut'ah
  - Hadith of prohibition of Mut'ah at Khaybar
- Musa ibn ʿUqba
  - Kitab al-Maghazi
- Ibn Ishaq (died 767)
  - Sirah Rasul Allah
- Imam Malik (died 796)
  - Al-Muwatta
- Al-Waqidi (745–822)
  - Book of History and Campaigns
- Ali ibn al-Madini (777–850)
  - The Book of Knowledge about the Companions
- Ibn Hisham (died 834)
  - Sirah Rasul Allah
- Dhul-Nun al-Misri (died 859)
- Muhammad al-Bukhari (810–870)
  - Sahih Bukhari
- Muslim b. al-Hajjaj (died 875)
  - Sahih Muslim
- Ibn Majah (died 886)
  - Sunan Ibn Majah
- Abu Da'ud (died 888)
  - Sunan Abi Da'ud
- Al-Tirmidhi (died 892)
  - Sunan al-Tirmidhi
- Abu al-Hasan 'Alī al-Mas'ūdī (896–956)
  - Muruj adh-dhahab wa ma'adin al-jawahir (The Meadows of Gold and Mines of Gems) (947)
- Ibn Wahshiyya (c. 904)
  - Nabataean Agriculture
  - Kitab Shawq al-Mustaham
- Al-Nasa'i (died 915)
  - Sunan al-Sughra
- Muhammad ibn Jarir al-Tabari (838–923)
  - History of the Prophets and Kings
  - Tafsir al-Tabari
- Al-Baladhuri (died 892)
  - Kitab Futuh al-Buldan
  - Genealogies of the Nobles
- Hakim al-Nishaburi (died 1014)
  - Al-Mustadrak alaa al-Sahihain
- Abū Rayhān al-Bīrūnī (973–1048)
  - Indica
  - History of Mahmud of Ghazni and his father
  - History of Khawarazm
- Abd al-Latif al-Baghdadi (13th century)
- Ibn Abi Zar (died 1310/1320)
  - Rawd al-Qirtas
- Al-Dhahabi (1274–1348)
  - Major History of Islam
  - Talkhis al-Mustadrak
  - Tadhkirat al-huffaz
  - Al-Kamal fi ma`rifat al-rijal
- Ibn Kathir (1300-1373)
  - Al-Bidāya wa-n-Nihāya
  - Al-Sira Al-Nabawiyya
- Ibn Khaldun (1332–1406)
  - Muqaddimah (1377)
  - Kitab al-Ibar
- Ibn Hajar al-Asqalani (1372–1449)
  - Fath al-Bari
  - Tahdhib al-Tahdhib
  - Finding the Truth in Judging the Companinons
  - Bulugh al-Maram

== Modern academic scholarship ==
The earliest academic scholarship on Islam in Western countries tended to involve Christian and Jewish translators and commentators. They translated the readily available Sunni texts from Arabic into European languages (including German, Italian, French, and English), then summarized and commented in a fashion that was often hostile to Islam. Notable Christian scholars included:

- William Muir (1819–1905)
- Reinhart Dozy (1820–1883) "Die Israeliten zu Mecca" (1864)
- David Samuel Margoliouth (1858–1940)
- William St. Clair Tisdall (1859–1928)
- Leone Caetani (1869–1935)
- Alphonse Mingana (1878–1937)

All these scholars worked in the late 19th and early 20th centuries.

Another pioneer of Islamic studies, Abraham Geiger (1810–1874), a prominent Jewish rabbi, approached Islam from that standpoint in his Was hat Mohammed aus dem Judenthume aufgenommen? (What did Muhammad borrow from Judaism?) (1833). Geiger's themes continued in Rabbi Abraham I. Katsh's "Judaism and the Koran" (1962)

=== Establishment of academic research ===
Other scholars, notably those in the German tradition, took a more neutral view. (The 19th-century scholar Julius Wellhausen (1844–1918) offers a prime example.) They also started, cautiously, to question the truth of the Arabic texts. They took a source-critical approach, trying to sort the Islamic texts into elements to be accepted as historically true, and elements to be discarded as polemic or as pious fiction. Such scholars included:

- Michael Jan de Goeje (1836–1909)
- Theodor Nöldeke (1836–1930)
- Ignaz Goldziher (1850–1921)
- Henri Lammens (1862–1937)
- Arthur Jeffery (1892–1959)
- H. A. R. Gibb (1895–1971)
- Joseph Schacht (1902–1969)
- Montgomery Watt (1909–2006)

=== The revisionist challenge ===
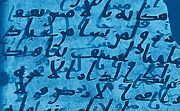
Manuscripts found in Sanaa. The "subtexts" revealed using UV light are very different from today's Qur'an. Gerd R. Puin believed this to mean an evolving text. A similar phrase is used by Lawrence Conrad for biography of Muhammad. Because, according to his studies, Islamic scientific view on the date of birth of Muhammad until the second century A.H. had exhibited a diversity of 85 years.

In the 1970s the Revisionist School of Islamic Studies, or what has been described as a "wave of sceptical scholars", challenged a great deal of the received wisdom in Islamic studies. They argued that the Islamic historical tradition had been greatly corrupted in transmission. They tried to correct or reconstruct the early history of Islam from other, presumably more reliable, sources—such as found coins, inscriptions, and non-Islamic sources of that era. They argue that contrary to Islamic historical tradition, "Islam was like other religions, the product of a religious evolution". The idea that there was an abrupt "discontinuity between the pre-Islamic and Islamic worlds"—i.e. between Persian and Byzantine civilization and Islamic religion, governance, culture—"strains the imagination". But if "we begin by assuming that there must have been some continuity, we need either go beyond the Islamic sources" which indicate abrupt change, or "reinterpret them".

The oldest of this group was John Wansbrough (1928–2002). Wansbrough's works were widely noted, but not necessarily widely read, owing to (according to Fred Donner), his "awkward prose style, diffuse organization, and tendency to rely on suggestive implication rather than tight argument". Nonetheless, his scepticism influenced a number of younger scholars, including:

- Martin Hinds (1941–1988)
- Patricia Crone (1945–2015)
- Michael Cook (1940–)

In 1977 Crone and Cook published Hagarism: The Making of the Islamic World, which argued that the traditional early history of Islam is a myth, generated after the Arab conquests of Egypt, Syria, and Persia to give a solid ideological foundation to the new Arab regimes in those lands. Hagarism suggests that the Qur'an was composed later than the traditional narrative tell us, and that the Arab conquests may have been the cause, rather than the consequence, of Islam. The main evidence adduced for this thesis consisted of contemporary non-Muslim sources recording many early Islamic events. If such events could not be supported by outside evidence, then (according to Crone and Cook) they should be dismissed as myth.

Crone defended the use of non-Muslim sources saying that "of course these sources are hostile [to the conquering Muslims] and from a classical Islamic view they have simply got everything wrong; but unless we are willing to entertain the notion of an all-pervading literary conspiracy between the non-Muslim peoples of the Middle East, the crucial point remains that they have got things wrong on very much the same points."

Crone and Cook's more recent work has involved intense scrutiny of early Islamic sources, but not their total rejection. (See, for instance, Crone's 1987 publications, Roman, Provincial, and Islamic Law and Meccan Trade and the Rise of Islam, both of which assume the standard outline of early Islamic history while questioning certain aspects of it; also Cook's 2001 Commanding Right and Forbidding Wrong in Islamic Thought, which also cites early Islamic sources as authoritative.)

Both Crone and Cook have later suggested that the central thesis of their book "Hagarism: The Making of the Islamic World" was mistaken because the evidence they had to support the thesis was not sufficient or internally consistent enough. Crone has suggested that the book was “a graduate essay" and "a hypothesis," not "a conclusive finding.”

In 1972 construction workers discovered a cache of ancient Qur'ans – commonly known as the Sanaa manuscript – in a mosque in Sanaa, Yemen. The German scholar Gerd R. Puin has been investigating these Qur'an fragments for years. His research team made 35,000 microfilm photographs of the manuscripts, which he dated to the early part of the 8th century. Puin has not published the entirety of his work, but has noted unconventional verse orderings, minor textual variations, and rare styles of orthography. He has also suggested that some of the parchments were palimpsests which had been reused. Puin believed that this implied an evolving text as opposed to a fixed one.

Karl-Heinz Ohlig has also researched Christian/Jewish roots of the Qur'an and its related texts. He sees the name Muhammad itself ("the blessed", as in Benedictus qui venit) as part of that tradition.

In their study of the traditional Islamic accounts of the early conquest of different cities—Damascus and Caesarea in Syria, Babilyn/al-Fusat and Alexandria in Egypt, Tustar in Khuzistan and Cordoba in Spain—scholars Albrecht Noth and Lawrence Conrad find a suspicious pattern whereby the cities "are all described as having fallen into the hands of the Muslims in precisely the same fashion". There is a

"traitor who ... points out a weak spot in the city's fortification to the Muslim besiegers; a celebration in the city which diverts the attention of the besieged; then a few assault troops who scale the walls ... a shout of Allahu akbar! ... from the assault troops as a sign that they have entered the town; the opening of one of the gates from inside, and the onslaught of the entire army."

They conclude these accounts can not be "the reporting of history" but are instead stereotyped story tales with little historical value.

Contemporary scholars have tended to use the histories rather than the hadith, and to analyze the histories in terms of the tribal and political affiliations of the narrators (if that can be established), thus making it easier to guess in which direction the material might have been slanted. Notable scholars include:

- Fred M. Donner
- Wilferd Madelung
- Gerald Hawting
- Jonathan Berkey
- Andrew Rippin

An alternative postrevisionist approach has made use of hadith of uncertain authenticity to tell a history of early Islam after the death of Muhammad. Here the key has been to analyze hadith as collective memories that shaped the culture and society of urban Muslims in the late seventh and eighth centuries CE.

== Scholars combining traditional and academic scholarship ==
A few scholars have attempted to bridge the divide between Islamic and Western-style secular scholarship.

- Joel Hayward
- Sherman Jackson
- Fazlur Rahman

They have completed both Islamic and Western academic training.

== See also ==
- Glossary of Islam
- Outline of Islam
- Index of Islam-related articles
- Succession to Muhammad
- Timeline of early Islamic history
- Timeline of 7th-century Muslim history
- Timeline of 8th-century Muslim history
- List of biographies of Muhammad
- Early Muslim conquests
- Classical Islam

== Bibliography ==
- Yılmaz, Halil İbrahim; İzgi, Mahmut Cihat; Erbay, Enes Ensar; Şenel, Samet (2024). "Studying early Islam in the third millennium: a bibliometric analysis". Humanities and Social Sciences Communications. 11 (1) 1521. doi:10.1057/s41599-024-04058-2. hdl:11552/7918.
- Charles, Robert H. (2007) [1916]. The Chronicle of John, Bishop of Nikiu: Translated from Zotenberg's Ethiopic Text. Merchantville, NJ: Evolution Publishing. ISBN 9781889758879.
- Donner, Fred (1998). Narratives of Islamic Origins: The Beginnings of Islamic Historical Writing. Darwin Press. ISBN 978-0878501274.
- Hoyland, Robert (1997). Seeing Islam as Others Saw It: A Survey and Evaluation of Christian, Jewish and Zoroastrian Writings on Early Islam. Darwin Press. ISBN 978-0878501250.
- Madelung, Wilferd (1997). The Succession to Muhammad: A Study of the Early Caliphate. Cambridge University Press. ISBN 0-521-64696-0.
- Vansina, Jan (1985). Oral Tradition as History. University of Wisconsin Press. ISBN 978-0299102142.
