= Seeing Islam as Others Saw It =

Book by Robert G. Hoyland

- Book cover
- Author: Robert G. Hoyland
- Language: English
- Series: Studies in Late Antiquity and Early Islam
- Subject: Islamic Empire—History—622–661—Historiography; Islamic Empire—History—661–750—Historiography; Middle East—Civilization—To 622—Historiography
- Publisher: Darwin Press
- Publication date: 1997
- Publication place: United States
- Media type: Hardcover
- Pages: 872
- ISBN: 0-87850-125-8
- OCLC: 36884186
- Dewey Decimal: 939.4 21
- LC Class: DS38.1 .H69 1997

Seeing Islam As Others Saw It: A Survey and Evaluation of Christian, Jewish and Zoroastrian Writings on Early Islam from the Studies in Late Antiquity and Early Islam series is a book by scholar of the Middle East Robert G. Hoyland.

The book contains an extensive collection of Greek, Syriac, Coptic, Armenian, Latin, Jewish, Persian, and Chinese primary sources written between 620 and 780 AD in the Middle East, which provides a survey of eyewitness accounts of historical events during the formative period of Islam.

The book presents the evidentiary text of over 120 seventh-century sources, one of which (Thomas the Presbyter) contains what Hoyland believes is the "first explicit reference to Muhammad in a non-Muslim source:"

In the year 945, indiction 7, on Friday 7 February (634) at the ninth hour, there was a battle between the Romans and the Arabs of Muhammad (tayyaye d-Mhmt) in Palestine twelve miles [19 km] east of Gaza. The Romans fled, leaving behind the patrician Bryrdn, whom the Arabs killed. Some 4000 poor villagers of Palestine were killed there, Christians, Jews and Samaritans. The Arabs ravaged the whole region.

According to Michael G. Morony, Hoyland emphasizes the parallels between Muslim and non-Muslim accounts of history emphasizing that non-Muslim texts often explain the same history as the Muslim ones even though they were recorded earlier. He concludes "Hoyland's treatment of the materials is judicious, honest, complex, and extremely useful."

== Sources ==
=== Greek sources ===
- A Christian Apologist of 634
- John Moschus
- Sophronius, Patriarch of Jerusalem
- Pope Martin I
- Maximus the Confessor
- Anti-Jewish Polemicists of the Seventh Century
- The Miracles of S. Demetrius and S. George
- Anastasius of Sinai
- Patriarch Germanus
- Cosmas of Jerusalem
- Stephen the Sabaite
- John the Eremopolite
- A Greek-Coptic Papyrus
- Berlin Papyrus 10677
- Timothy the Stylite

=== West Syrian, Coptic and Armenian sources ===
- Fragment on the Arab Conquests
- Thomas the Presbyter
- Homily on the Child Saints of Babylon
- Gabriel of Qartmin
- Sebeos, Bishop of the Bagratunis
- Benjamin I, Patriarch of Alexandria
- Maronite Chronicle
- George of Resh'aina
- Daniel, Bishop of Edessa
- Athanasius of Balad, Patriarch of Antioch
- Isaac, Patriarch of Alexandria
- John, Bishop of Nikiu
- Theodotus of Amida
- Jacob of Edessa
- Zacharias, Bishop of Sakha
- Simeon of the Olives
- A Coptic Papyrus
- Theophilus I of Alexandria
- Letter of Bishop Jonah

=== East Syrian sources ===
- Isho'yahb III of Adiabene
- Chronicle of Khuzestan
- Rabban Hormizd
- John bar Penkaye
- Hnanisho' the Exegete
- John of Daylam
- Isho'bokht, Metropolitan of Fars
- Abbots of the Monastery of Sabrisho'
- Isho'dnah of Basra
- Thomas of Marga

=== Latin sources ===
- Fredegar, a Frankish Chronicler
- Arculf
- Willibald
- Later testimonia
- Historia miscella
- Morienus the Greek

=== Chinese sources ===
- T'ung tien
- The Official T'ang History
- Ts'e-fu yuan-kuei

== Apocalypses and visions ==
=== Syriac texts ===
- Ps.-Ephraem
- Ps.-Methodius
- Edessene Pseudo-Methodius and John the Little
- Bahira
- Pseudo-Ezra
- Copto-Arabic texts
- Pseudo-Shenoute
- Apocalypse of Pseudo-Athanasius
- Apocalypse of Samuel of Qalamun and Pisentius of Qift
- Coptic Apocalypse of Daniel
- Book of the Rolls

=== Greek texts ===
- Pseudo-Methodius, Greek translation
- Greek Apocalypse of Daniel
- Vision of Enoch the Just
- Stephen of Alexandria
- Life of Andrew the Fool

=== Hebrew texts ===
- The Secrets of Rabbi Simon ben Yohai
- Pesiqta rabbati
- Pirkei de-Rabbi Eliezer
- Jewish Apocalypse on the Umayyads
- Signs of the Messiah
- On That Day
- Hazzan Daniel

=== Persian texts ===
- Bahman Yasht
- Jamasp Namag
- Bundahishn
- Denkard
- A Pahlavi Ballad on the End of Times
- The Prophecy of Rostam
- Persian Apocalypse of Daniel

=== Muslim Arabic texts ===
- Signs of the Hour
- `Abd Allah ibn al-Zubayr and the Mahdi
- Tiberius, Son of Justinian
- An Apocalyptic Chronicle

== Martyrologies ==
=== Greek texts ===
- Sixty Martyrs of Gaza
- George the Black
- A Christian Arab of Sinai
- Peter of Capitolias
- Sixty Pilgrims in Jerusalem
- Elias of Damascus
- Romanus the Neomartyr
- Copto-Arabic texts
- Menas the Monk
- Thomas, Bishop of Damascus

=== Armenian texts ===
- David of Dwin

=== Syriac texts ===
- Michael the Sabaite
- `Abd al-Masih al-Najrani al-Ghassani
- A Muslim at Diospolis

== Chronicles and histories ==
=== Syriac texts ===
- Theophilus of Edessa
- Chronicle of Zuqnin
- Ehnesh inscription
- Dionysius of Tellmahre
- Chronicle of 819
- Chronicle of 846
- Elias of Nisibis

=== Latin texts ===
- Byzantine-Arab Chronicle of 741
- Hispanic Chronicle of 754

=== Greek texts ===
- Theophanes the Confessor
- Patriarch Nicephorus
- A Short Chronology ad annum 818

=== Other ===
- Armenian texts
- Christian Arabic texts
- Agapius of Hierapolis
- Eutychius of Alexandria
- Chronicle of Siirt
- History of the Patriarchs of Alexandria
- Jewish texts
- Samaritan texts
- Derivative accounts

== Apologies and disputations ==
=== Syriac texts ===
- Patriarch John I and an Arab commander
- Monk of Beth Hale and an Arab notable
- Timothy I
- Bahira
- Greek texts
- John of Damascus
- correspondence of Leo III the Isaurian and Umar II

=== Christian Arabic texts ===
- Fi tathlith Allah al-wahid
- Papyrus Schott Reinhard no. 438
- Masa'il wa-ajwiba `aqliya wa-ilahiya

=== Jewish texts ===
- The Ten Wise Jews
- Targum Pseudo-Jonathan

=== Latin texts ===
- Istoria de Mahomet
- Tultusceptru de libro domni Metobii

=== Dubia ===
- John the Stylite
- Abjuration
- MS Mingana 184

== See also ==
- Islamic studies by author
