= Al-Layth ibn Sa'd =

8th-century Islamic jurist

Personal life
- Born: 713 CE Qalqashandah, Egypt
- Died: 791 CE Fustat, Egypt
- Era: Islamic Golden Age
- Region: Caliphate
- Main interest(s): Hadith, Fiqh
- Notable idea: Laythi madh'hab

Religious life
- Religion: Islam
- Jurisprudence: Independent (eponym of the Laythi school)

Muslim leader
- Influenced by: Ibn Shihab al-Zuhri
- Influenced: Al-Shafi'i, Yahya ibn Yahya al-Laythi

Al-Layth ibn Saʿd ibn ʿAbd al-Raḥmān al-Fahmī al-Qalqashandī (Arabic: الليث بن سعد بن عبد الرحمن الفهمي القلقشندي) was an Egyptian and the chief representative, imam, and eponym of the Laythi school of Islamic Jurisprudence. He was regarded as the main representative of an Egyptian tradition of law.

He was born in 713 CE in Qalqashanda, a village in Egypt and so his nisba is Al-Qalqashandī. Despite his Arabic nisba (Al-Fahmi), in his encyclopedic magnum opus entitled "Siyar a`lam al-nubala", the prominent scholar Al-Dhahabi mentioned that his family claimed a Persian origin from Isfahan, and this in turn became a common reference for later writers, maintaining that his Arabic nisba was the result of familiar loyalty to Khalid ibn Thabit ibn Dhain Al-Fahmi. Despite being among the most famous of jurists at the time, his students did not write down his teachings and spread it like the students of another famous jurist of the time, Malik ibn Anas.

He presided over the first trial of Elias of Heliopolis for apostasy in 779.

According to al-Shafi'i, founder of Shafiʽi school, al-Laythi were even greater jurist than Malik ibn Anas, founder of Maliki Madhhab school and al-Shafi'i own teacher.
