= Theodoret (disambiguation) =

Theodoret usually refers to the bishop of Cyrrhus (423–457).

Theodoret may also refer to:

- Theodoret (martyr), martyred at Antioch in 362
- Theodoret (patriarch of Antioch), fl. late 8th century
