= Homily on the Child Saints of Babylon =

The Homily on the Child Saints of Babylon is a Christian sermon given in Iraq "perhaps" in the 640s CE, though probably as late as mid eighth century.

- As for us, my loved ones, let us fast and pray without cease, and observe the commandments of the Lord so that the blessing of all our Fathers who have pleased Him may come down upon us. Let us not fast like the God-killing Jews, nor fast like the Saracens who are oppressors, who give themselves up to prostitution, massacre and lead into captivity the sons of men, saying: "We both fast and pray." Nor should we fast like those who deny the saving passion of our Lord who died for us, to free us from death and perdition. Rather let us fast like our Fathers the apostles who went out into all the world, suffering hunger and thirst, deprived of all. . . . Let us fast like Moses the arch-prophet, Elias and John, like the prophet Daniel and the three Saints in the furnace of fire. (Homily on the Child Saints of Babylon, 36

== Sources ==
- Seeing Islam As Others Saw It: A Survey and Evaluation of Christian, Jewish and Zoroastrian Writings on Early Islam (Studies in Late Antiquity and Early Islam) Robert G. Hoyland
