= Elias of Heliopolis =

8th-century Syrian Christian martyr

New Martyr
- Born: 759
- Died: 779
- Cause of death: Beheading
- Honored in: Eastern Orthodox Church; Syriac Orthodox Church
- Feast: 1 February or 4 February

The start of Elias' biography in the sole manuscript copy. His name in Greek, Ἡλία, can be read in the middle of the second line.

Elias of Heliopolis (Greek: Ἡλίας; 759–779), also called Elias of Damascus, was a Syrian carpenter and Christian martyr revered as a saint in the Eastern Orthodox Church and Syriac Orthodox church. He is known from a Greek hagiography.

== Dating ==
The Prosopographie der mittelbyzantinischen Zeit places Elias' birth in 758 or earlier, but his vital dates are usually given as 759–779 and occasionally as 775–795. His hagiography says that he died at twenty years of age in the year 6287. This is an anno mundi (year of the world) date, meant to indicate the number of years since Creation. If it follows the Byzantine era, then it corresponds to the year 779; in the Alexandrian era, it would be 795. Robert Hoyland argues for the former on the grounds that it corresponds with the reign of al-Mahdī (died 785), said in the hagiography to have been ruling at the time.

== Life ==
Elias was born into a Syrian Christian family of Baalbek (Heliopolis) in the ecclesiastical province of Second Phoenicia in the Abbasid Caliphate. There he was a trained as a carpenter. With his mother and two brothers, hoping to escape poverty, he went to Damascus. He was about ten years old. There he was employed by a Syrian Christian, who himself worked for an Arab Muslim. This Syrian was later persuaded to convert to Islam by his Arab employer. The Arab having arranged the marriage of his son, died shortly after. When the son's wife gave birth, he threw a party at which Elias was called upon to serve. The guests tried to persuade him to convert to Islam and thus become their social equal, but he put them off by claiming that a party was no place for such discussions.

Ultimately, Elias was persuaded to eat with them and join in the dancing. Some of the guests loosened or removed his belt, supposedly to allow him freer movement. The following morning, Elias rose while the others were still sleeping, tied on his belt and went to pray. A guest who saw him going accused him of having renounced his faith the night before, which Elias denied. This accusation was probably based on the significance of the belt, which was part of the standard dress of a dhimmī. To remove it publicly was a sign of renouncing one's faith. In the workshop, his Syrian employer warned him that he had had to intervene to prevent some guests from harming Elias and he told Elias that he would not pay him. Elias' brother urged him to leave Damascus until rumours died down and it became safe to return. The whole family moved back to Baalbek.

Eight years later, with the approval of his brothers, Elias returned to Damascus and opened a shop making camel saddles. He was twenty years old. His former employer, now a competitor, invited him to return to his workshop but Elias refused, whereupon the Syrian apostate urged his boss, the Arab, to report Elias' conversion and apostasy on the night of the party. Elias was brought before the judge al-Layth who gave him an opportunity to return to Islam. Refusing, he was tortured and put in chains. In prison, he was comforted by visions. He was finally brought before the governor, Muḥammad, nephew of the reigning caliph al-Mahdī, who tried to persuade him to return to Islam through punishments and the offer of material rewards. When he still refused, he was beheaded on 1 February and his corpse hung outside the city gates for fourteen days before being thrown into the river Baradā. Some relics (including limbs) were recovered by the Christians of Baalbek and others reported receiving visions of him after his death.

== Hagiography ==
The single manuscript copy of Elias' hagiography (BHG 578–579) is found in the Bibliothèque nationale de France (BnF), Coislin 303, at folios 236^{V}–249^{V}. It dates to the tenth or eleventh century and was probably created in a monastery in the Holy Land. The text itself, which is anonymous, appears to have been written not long after the events it describes, given its attention to detail. The author claims to have written two other hagiographies of martyrs to Islam, but he did not know Elias personally.

Besides his own biography, Elias is known from the Palestinian Georgian Calendar and the Martyrology of Rabban Ṣalība. According to the former, his feast day was 4 February. According to the latter, his feast was celebrated in Bā Qisyān (Beth Qūsyānā) near Ḥaḥ in the region of Ṭur ʿAbdin on 1 February. Christian Sahner, however, questions the identification of this martyr with Elias of Heliopolis because Rabban Ṣalība does not associated him with Damascus or Baalbek.

== Bibliography ==
- Binggeli, André (2018). "La réception de l'hagiographie palestinienne à Byzance après les conquêtes arabes". In Antonio Rigo; Michele Trizio; Eleftherios Despotakis (eds.). Byzantine Hagiography: Texts, Themes and Projects. Brepols. pp. 265–284.
- Detoraki, Marina (2014). "Greek Passions of the Martyrs in Byzantium". In Stephanos Efthymiadis (ed.). The Ashgate Research Companion to Byzantine Hagiography, Volume II: Genres and Contexts. Ashgate. pp. 61–101.
- Efthymiadis, Stephanos (2008). "The Martyrdom of Elias of Helioupolis (Elias of Damascus)". In David Thomas; Barbara Roggema (eds.). Christian–Muslim Relations: A Bibliographical History. Vol. 1 (600–900). Brill. pp. 916–918.
- Fiey, Jean Maurice (2004). Saints syriaques. Darwin Press.
- Foss, Clive (2007). "Byzantine Saints in Early Islamic Syria". Analecta Bollandiana. 125 (1): 93–119. doi:10.1484/J.ABOL.5.102076.
- Hoyland, Robert G. (1997). Seeing Islam As Others Saw It: A Survey and Evaluation of Christian, Jewish and Zoroastrian Writings on Early Islam. Darwin Press.
- Lilie, Ralph-Johannes; Ludwig, Claudia; Pratsch, Thomas; Zielke, Beate (1998–2013). "Elias (no. 1485)". Prosopographie der mittelbyzantinischen Zeit (in German). Berlin and Boston: De Gruyter.
- McGrath, Stamatina (2003). "Elias of Heliopolis: The Life of an Eighth-Century Syrian Saint". In John W. Nesbitt (ed.). Byzantine Authors: Literary Activities and Preoccupations. Brill. pp. 85–107.
- Peeters, Paul (1908). "Le martyrologe de Rabban Sliba". Analecta Bollandiana. 27: 129–200. doi:10.1484/J.ABOL.4.01857.
- Sahner, Christian (2002). "Old Martyrs, New Martyrs and the Coming of Islam: Writing Hagiography after the Conquests" (PDF). Bulletin of the School of Oriental and African Studies. 65: 89–112.
- Sizgorich, Thomas (2017). "The Dancing Martyr: Violence, Identity, and the Abbasid Postcolonial". History of Religions. 57 (1): 2–27. doi:10.1086/692315. S2CID 164234424.
