= Timothy of Kakhushta =

Syrian hermit

Timothy of Kakhushta or Timothy the Stylite (fl. c. 800) was a Syrian Melkite hermit and holy man known from an Arabic biography written not long after his death, The Life of the Holy and Virtuous Ascetic Timothy.

Timothy was born in the village of Kakhushta (Kakhshata), a place unattested outside of his Life. Most of his life was spent in the region between Antioch and Aleppo. His parents died while he was young and he was raised by his siblings. Beaten by his eldest brother at the age of seven, he fled to the village of Kafr Zuma. When he came of age, he went on a pilgrimage to Jerusalem and became a monk. Although a dyothelite Chalcedonian, he joined a monothelite Maronite monastery and learned the craft of woodworking. He eventually returned to Kafr Zuma, where he lived many years as an anchorite. One day, at the age of about forty, as he was travelling with some monks to Antioch, they were invited by the villagers of Kakhushta to celebrate the feast of Saint George there. Reunited with his family, Timothy opted to stay. His reputation as a holy man began to attract disciples so that by the time he died there was a monastic community around his hermitage. His biography implies that he practiced stylitism.

There is uncertainty surrounding the dating of Timothy's life. In the earliest recension of his Life, found in the Bibliothèque nationale de France, Ar. 259, a manuscript dating to the fourteenth century, he is said to have died at the age of 85 in the year 871. This, however, is incompatible with his being over 40 years old during the reign of the Abbasid caliph Harun al-Rashid (786–809). While Robert Hoyland opts for the death date and rejects the caliphal miracle as an embellishment, John Lamoreaux, who edited the text, trusts the references to Harun and the Patriarch Theodoret of Antioch and places Timothy's death in the early ninth century.

The Life of the Holy and Virtuous Ascetic Timothy (Arabic: سيرة القديس الفاضل الناسك تماثيوس, romanized: Sīrat al-qiddīs al-fāḍil al-nāsik Tīmāthayūs), called the Life of Timothy of Kakhushta for short, is an anonymous saint's biography originally written in Arabic but surviving in several languages and recensions. It was probably composed at Timothy's monastery in the ninth or tenth century. Timothy's body was transferred to Antioch in the eleventh century. At that time, the original life was embellished. This second Arabic recension was translated into Greek, which in turn was translated into Georgian. The Georgian version contains a few details not found in the Arabic. It says that Timothy went to Jerusalem to avoid marrying his foster-parents' daughter and that he remained in the Judaean Desert for 27 years. The Greek version is lost. A third Arabic recension is also known. There is a modern edition and English translation based on the first two Arabic recensions. There are a total of four complete or partial Arabic manuscript copies, including two from Our Lady of Saidnaya Monastery, one undated and the other made in 1396.

== Bibliography ==
- Foss, Clive (2007). "Byzantine Saints in Early Islamic Syria". Analecta Bollandiana. 125 (1): 93–119. doi:10.1484/J.ABOL.5.102076.
- Hoyland, Robert G. (1997). Seeing Islam As Others Saw It: A Survey and Evaluation of Christian, Jewish and Zoroastrian Writings on Early Islam. Darwin Press.
- Lamoreaux, John C.; Cairala, Cyril, eds. (2000). The Life of Timothy of Kakhushta: Two Arabic Texts. Patrologia Orientalis. Vol. 216 (48.4). Brepols.
- Lamoreaux, John C. (2008). "The Life of Timothy of Kakhushta". In David Thomas; Barbara Roggema (eds.). Christian–Muslim Relations: A Bibliographical History. Vol. 1 (600–900). Brill. pp. 919–922. doi:10.1163/1877-8054_cmri_COM_24300.
- Tannous, Jack B. (2018). The Making of the Medieval Middle East: Religion, Society, and Simple Believers. Princeton University Press.
- Wood, Philip (2011). "Christian Authority Under the Early Abbasids: The Life of Timothy of Kakushta". Proche-Orient Chrétien. 61 (3–4): 258–274.
- Wood, Philip (2021). The Imam of the Christians: The World of Dionysius of Tel-Mahre, c. 750–850. Princeton University Press.
