= Laythi school =

Legal school in Sunni Islam

The Laythi school (Arabic: المذهب الليثي) was an 8th-century religious law school of Fiqh within Sunni Islam whose Imam was Al-Layth ibn Sa'd. One of known characteristics of al-Layth jurisprudence was his rejection towards Maliki usage of Madina custom as an independent source of law.

== History ==
Al-Layth ibn Sa'd was born in Egypt of Persian parentage in the year 716. After an extensive study of all the then-known areas of Islamic learning, al-Layth became Egypt's major scholar. He was a contemporary of both Imam Abu Hanifa and Imam Malik. He debated with the latter on various points of Fiqh, including his rejection of Malik's inclusion of the Medina custom as an independent source of Fiqh.

== Disappearance ==
Al-Layth's school disappeared shortly after his death in 791 for three key reasons. The first is that he neither compiled, dictated, nor instructed his followers to record his legal opinions and their proofs, so little remains from his school beyond a few references in early books of comparative Fiqh. The second reason is that Al-Layth had few students, none of whom became outstanding jurists, so the school was not popularized. The final reason is that Imam Al-Shafi'i settled in Egypt soon after Al-Layth's death, and so the Shafi'i school quickly displaced the Laythi school.
