= Trophies of Damascus =

Trophies of Damascus, or alternatively Trophies Framed against Jews in Damascus, was a 7th-century anti-Jewish dialogue written around 681 A.D. in Damascus. Detailed inside are four discussions surrounding various theological issues, as well as a dialogue between a Jewish stylite and a Chalcedonian - the second dialogue is referred to as the "Bonwetsch Dialogue" by some scholars. After the dialogues, there is disarray among the Jews, with some saying, "By the Law I think we are wrong".

Trophies of Damascus has been discovered in fragments inside a palimpsest in Vienna; however, the full text is only preserved in the Bibliothèque Nationale de France Parisinus Coislianus 299 along with other anti-Jewish works such as the Doctrina Jacobi and an extended version of Dialogue of Timothy and Aquila Because Damascus was under Arab rule at this time, some scholars suggest that the Jews are actually a cipher for the Arabs.

== Structure and Content ==
=== Discussion One ===
The first dialogue is the most thought out and explored of all four. It explores the witness of the Old Testament in relation to the Divinity of Jesus.

=== Discussion Two ===
The second dialogue concerns the fall of the Jewish polity and the rise of Christianity, as well as the implications of the Cross in the Old Testament, especially in the case of the bronze serpent in the Book of Numbers.

=== Discussion Three ===
The third dialogue defends concerns the worship of images and idols, and the label of "Christian".

=== Discussion Four ===
The fourth dialogue discusses the date of Jesus' coming as specified in the Book of Daniel. Contained as well is a list of Persian, Egyptian, and Greek rulers to reinforce the chronology in the Book of Daniel.

=== Transition ===
In between the above dialogues and the Bonwetsch Dialogue is a heresiological overview from Arianism to Miaphysitism. Towards the end, the author claims that Nestorianism and the followers of Severus were the two greatest evils of the Church. Many of these mentioned heresies appear in the following Bonwetsch Dialogue.

=== Bonwetsch Dialogue ===
The Bonwetsch Dialogue (named after the editor, N. Bonwetsch) centers around a Jewish stylite and Chalcedonian who poses as a Miaphysite Aphthartodocetist. The strategy of deception is used throughout the polemic, and ends with the Jewish stylite resorting to irrational arguments rather than rational ones.

== Author ==
The author is described as a monk who desired the conversion of Jews. This is made clear during the "transition" of the book:

...let us then rush into the war against the heretic, after the Jewish war, as the occasion calls us from strength to strength.

He had supposedly traveled to Sinai and was said to be loyal to the Roman Empire. He described his time as when Christians were taken prisoner, fifty years after the beginning of an unspecified great war, and fifty so years after Mohammedans had first attacked Palestine. His theory of the redemption of Jesus is similar to that of Anselm, as revealed in the dialogues. As well, he defends the worship of Images, perhaps implying that the Iconoclastic controversy was happening during this time.
