= Fragment on the Arab Conquests =

636 historical document

Fragment on the Arab Conquests are fragmentary notes that were written around the year 636 AD on the front blank pages of a sixth-century Syriac Christian manuscript of the Gospel of Mark. The fragment depicts events from the early seventh century conflict between the Byzantines and "the Arabs of Muhammad", particularly of the battle of Yarmouk.

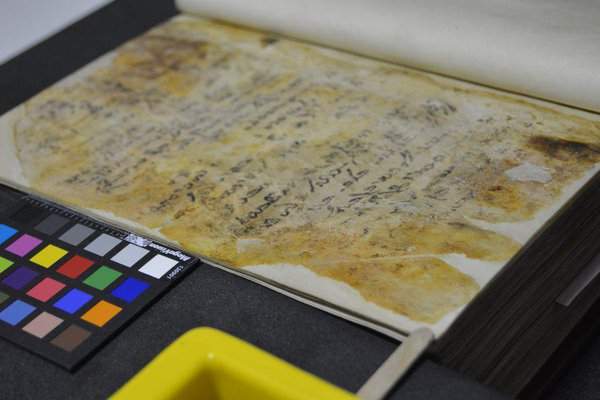
Fragment on Arab Conquest

== Text ==
Text in square brackets is conjectured, being unreadable in the original. This is clear in the original manuscripts.

In January [the people of] Ḥomṣ took the word for their lives and many villages were ravaged by the killing of [the Arabs of] Mūḥmd and many people were slain and [taken] prisoner from Galilee as far as Beth...

On the tw[enty-six]th of May the Saq[īlā]ra went [...] from the vicinity of Ḥomṣ and the Romans chased them [...]

On the tenth [of August] the Romans fled from the vicinity of Damascus [and there were killed] many [people], some ten thousand. And at the turn [of the ye]ar the Romans came. On the twentieth of August in the year n[ine hundred and forty-]seven there gathered in Gabitha [a multitude of] the Romans, and many people [of the R]omans were kil[led], [s]ome fifty thousand.

== Analysis ==
The fragments are believed to be contemporary to the events of the Arab conquest of the early 7th century. They also provide one of the earlier dates for the battle of Yarmuk as having taken place on 20 August 636, assuming Yarmouk is to be identified with the "battle of Gabitha" mentioned in the fragments.

Cook and Crone in Hagarism: The Making of the Islamic World take the fragments to indicate that Muhammad was still alive in 636 at the battle of Yarmouk, contradicting the Muslim accounts of his death.

== See also ==
- Thomas the Presbyter
- Doctrina Jacobi
