= Thomas the Presbyter =

7th-century Syriac Orthodox priest

Thomas the Presbyter (fl. 640) was a Syriac Orthodox priest from the vicinity of Reshaina in Upper Mesopotamia who wrote the Syriac Chronicle of 640, which is also known by many other names.

The Chronicle of 640 is an idiosyncratic universal history down to the year AD 640. It survives only in a single manuscript codex, now British Library, Add MS 14,643. This manuscript was copied in 724 and the copyist added a single folio of text to the end, containing a list of caliphs translated from Arabic. Although it has been taken as an integral part of the text, the copying scribe clearly marked off his addition by preceding it with the words "it is finished" to indicate the end of the work he was copying.

Robert Hoyland identifies seven parts to the original Chronicle of 640:

1. an incomplete geographical treatise
2. a genealogy from Adam to the sons of Jacob
3. a table of pagan rulers from Abraham to Constantine I with the main events of their reigns and, in Thomas's words, "a narrative to show how they were subjected to the Romans"
4. a chronological table from Abraham and Ninus to Constantine summarizing the Chronicon of Eusebius of Caesarea
5. a continuation of Eusebius down to the thirtieth year of the Emperor Heraclius, i.e., 640
6. an "explanation (sūkālā) of the years" with seemingly random theological and historical notes
7. a list of ecumenical councils with dates and rulers, including a condemnation of the Council of Chalcedon

The writings provide an eyewitness account to the Arab conquest in the mid-7th century (the 10th century according to the Seleucid year numbering):

In the year 945, indiction 7, on Friday 4 February at the ninth hour, there was a battle between the Romans and the Tayyaye of Muhmd in Palestine twelve miles east of Gaza. The Romans fled, leaving behind the patrician bryrdn, whom the Arabs killed. Some 4,000 poor villagers of Palestine were killed there, Christians, Jews and Samaritans. The Arabs ravaged the whole region.

In the year 947, indiction 9, the Arabs invaded the whole of Syria and went down to Persia and conquered it. The Arabs climbed the mountain of Mardin and killed many monks there in [the monasteries of] Qedar and Bnata. There died the blessed man Simon, doorkeeper of Qedar, brother of Thomas the priest.

== Bibliography ==
- Debié, Muriel; Taylor, David G. K. (2012). "Syriac and Syro-Arabic Historical Writing, c. 500–c. 1400". The Oxford History of Historical Writing. Vol. 2. Oxford University Press. pp. 155–179.
- Hoyland, Robert G. (1997). Seeing Islam As Others Saw It: A Survey and Evaluation of Christian, Jewish and Zoroastrian Writings on Early Islam. Darwin Press.
- Palmer, Andrew (1993). The Seventh Century in the West-Syrian Chronicles. Liverpool University Press.
- Van Ginkel, Jan (2010). "Composite Chronicle of 636/40". In Graeme Dunphy (ed.). Encyclopedia of the Medieval Chronicle. Vol. 1. Leiden: Brill. p. 485.
