= Theodoret (patriarch of Antioch) =

Melkite patriarch of Antioch

Theodoret was the Melkite (Greek) patriarch of Antioch in the late 8th century and possibly into the 9th, during the reign of the Abbasid caliph Harun al-Rashid. The exact dates of his patriarchate are the subject of disagreement. Date ranges of c. 787–c. 799, 795–812 and c. 794–811 have been offered.

Theodoret plays a central role in the Life of the hermit Timothy of Kakhushta, who admonishes him for his luxurious living. The Life is the only source to record that he was arrested by Harun. The saint's prayers reportedly saved him from execution and, when oil blessed by Timothy cured the caliph's son, the patriarch even received concessions for his flock. The 12th-century Chronicle of Michael the Great reports that Theodoret deposed Theodore Abu Qurra as bishop of Harran, but doubt has been cast on the accuracy of this report.
