= Madhhab =

Islamic legal schools of law

A madhhab (Arabic: مَذْهَب, romanized: madhhab, lit. 'way to act', IPA: [ˈmæðhæb], pl. مَذَاهِب, madhāhib, [mæˈðæːhɪb]) refers to any school of thought within Islamic jurisprudence. The major Sunni madhhab are Hanafi, Maliki, Shafi'i, and Hanbali. They emerged in the ninth and tenth centuries CE and by the twelfth century almost all Islamic jurists aligned themselves with a particular madhhab. These four schools recognize each other's validity and they have interacted in legal debate over the centuries. Rulings (Fatwa) of these schools are followed across the Muslim world without exclusive regional restrictions, but they each came to dominate in different parts of the world.

For example, the Maliki school is predominant in North and West Africa; the Hanafi school in South and Central Asia; the Shafi'i school in East Africa and Southeast Asia; and the Hanbali school in North and Central Arabia. The first centuries of Islam also witnessed a number of short-lived Sunni madhhabs. The Zahiri school, which is considered to be endangered, continues to exert influence over legal thought. The development of Shia legal schools occurred along the lines of theological differences and resulted in the formation of the Ja'fari madhhab amongst Twelver Shias, as well as the Isma'ili and Zaydi madhhabs amongst Isma'ilis and Zaydis respectively, whose differences from Sunni legal schools are roughly of the same order as the differences among Sunni schools. The Ibadi legal school, distinct from Sunni and Shia madhhabs, is predominant in Oman. Unlike Sunnis, Shias, and Ibadis, non-denominational Muslims are not affiliated with any madhhab.

The transformations of Islamic legal institutions in the modern era have had profound implications for the madhhab system. With the spread of codified state laws in the Muslim world, the influence of the madhhabs beyond personal ritual practice depends on the status accorded to them within the national legal system. State law codification commonly drew on rulings from multiple madhhabs, and legal professionals trained in modern law schools have largely replaced traditional ulama as interpreters of the resulting laws. In the 20th century, some jurists began to assert their intellectual independence from traditional madhhabs. With the spread of Salafi influence and reformist currents in the 20th century; a handful of Salafi scholars have asserted independence from being strictly bound by the traditional legal mechanisms of the four schools. Nevertheless, the majority of Sunni scholarship continues to uphold post-classical creedal belief in rigorously adhering (taqlid) to one of the four schools in all legal details.

The Amman Message, which was endorsed in 2005 by prominent Islamic scholars around the world, recognized four Sunni schools (Hanafi, Maliki, Shafi'i, Hanbali), two Shia schools (Ja'fari, Zaydi), the Ibadi school, and the Zahiri school. Schools of Islamic jurisprudence are located in Pakistan, Iran, Bangladesh, India, Indonesia, Nigeria, Egypt, Turkey, Afghanistan, Kazakhstan, Russia, China, the Philippines, Algeria, Libya, Saudi Arabia, and multiple other countries.

== History / Relationship with politics ==
Early Islamic law emerged from a combination of administrative and community-based practices in the conquered territories and shaped by the religious and ethical principles of Islam. While retaining certain aspects of pre-Islamic laws and customs —and modifying others— this legal system aimed to establish norms of Islamic conduct and resolving disputes arising within the community. This was a gradual process of development —taking place within the cultural and political context of the era and region— amidst retrospective constructs and traditions that reflected the understandings and solutions of the social fabric; it unfolded in circles of learning where students and aspiring scholars gathered to acquire knowledge from a local master and deliberate on religious matters—circles that would later come to be known as schools of law.

While the Sunni tradition (Hanafi, Maliki, Shafi'i, Hanbali) provided a broad jurisprudence in practical matters, its legal framework developed under the shadow of the Umayyad and Abbasid state apparatuses, prioritizing political stability, communal cohesion, and a public law rooted in Qurayshi lineage.

Conversely, Shi'a schools (Twelver, Zaidi, Ismaili) grounded both political and religious legitimacy in the theology of the Imamate, framing authority as an exclusive, divinely appointed right reserved for the infallible progeny of the Ahl al-Bayt. In radical opposition to both of these lineage- and charisma-centered aristocracies, the Ibadi school—derived from the moderate wing of the Kharijite movement—rejected tribal and genealogical elitism, advocating for a merit-based, elective, and accountable model of public governance that eventually became predominant in Oman.

Ultimately, each legal school developed its distinct scriptural canon, hadith collections, and hermeneutical methodologies primarily to substantiate and legitimize its underlying political philosophy and framework of authority.

=== "Ancient" schools ===
According to John Burton, "modern research shows" that fiqh was first "regionally organized" with "considerable disagreement and variety of view". In the second century of Islam, schools of fiqh were noted for the loyalty of their jurists to the legal practices of their local communities, whether Mecca, Kufa, Basra, Syria, etc. (Egypt's school in Fustat was a branch of Medina's school of law and followed such practices—up until the end of the 8th century—as basing verdict on one single witness, not two, and the oath of the claimant. Its principal jurist in the second half of the 8th century was al-Layth b. Sa'd.) (Note: It is usually assumed that no regional school developed in Egypt (unlike in Syria, Iraq and the Hijaz). Joseph Schach states that the legal milieu of Fustat (ancient Cairo) was a branch of the Medinan school of law. Regarding judicial practices, the qadis (judges) of Fustat resorted to the procedure called "al-yamin ma'a l-shahid", that is, the ability of the judge to base his verdict on one single witness and the oath of the claimant, instead of two witnesses as was usually required. Such a procedure was quite common under the early Umayyads, but by the early Abbasid period it had disappeared in Iraq and it was now regarded as the 'amal ("good practice") of Medina. Up until the end of the 8th century, the qadis of Fustat were still using this "Medinan" procedure and differentiated themselves from Iraqi practices. From a doctrinal point of view, however, the legal affiliation of Egypt could be more complex. The principal Egyptian jurist in the second half of the 8th century is al-Layth b. Sa'd. The only writing of his that has survived is a letter he wrote to Malik b. Anas, which has been preserved by Yahya b. Ma'in and al-Fasawi. In this letter, he proclaims his theoretical affiliation to the Medinan methodology and recognizes the value of the 'amal. Nevertheless, he distances himself from the Medinan School by opposing a series of Medinan legal views. He maintains that the common practice in other cities is also valuable, and thus implicitly defends the Egyptians' adherence to their own local tradition. Thus it is possible that, even though it did not develop into a formal school of law, a specific Egyptian legal milieu was distinct of the Medinan School in the 8th century.) Al-Shafiʽi wrote that, "every capital of the Muslims is a seat of learning whose people follow the opinion of one of their countrymen in most of his teachings".

The "real basis" of legal doctrine in these "ancient schools" was not a body of reports of Muhammad's sayings, doings, silent approval (the Hadith) or even those of his Companions, but the "living tradition" of the school as "expressed in the consensus of the scholars", according to Joseph Schacht.

=== Al-Shafi‘i and afterwards ===
It has been asserted that madhahib were consolidated in the 9th and 10th centuries as a means of excluding dogmatic theologians, government officials and non-Sunni sects from religious discourse. Historians have differed regarding the times at which the various schools emerged. One interpretation is that Sunni Islam was categorised into four groups: the Hanafites, Malikites, Shafi'ites, and Zahirites. Later, the Hanbalites and Jarirites developed two more schools; then various dynasties effected the eventual exclusion of the Jarirites; eventually, the Zahirites were also excluded when the Mamluk Sultanate established a total of four independent judicial positions, thus solidifying the Maliki, Hanafi, Shafi'i, and Hanbali schools. During the era of the Islamic Gunpowders, the Ottoman Empire reaffirmed the official status of these four schools as a reaction to Shi'ite Persia. Some are of the view that Sunni jurisprudence falls into two groups: Ahl al-Ra'i ("people of opinions", emphasizing scholarly judgment and reason) and Ahl al-Hadith ("people of traditions", emphasizing strict interpretation of scripture).

10th century Shi'ite scholar Ibn al-Nadim named eight groups: Maliki, Hanafi, Shafi'i, Zahiri, Imami Shi'ite, Ahl al-Hadith, Jariri, and Kharijite. Abu Thawr also had a school named after him. In the 12th century Jariri and Zahiri schools were absorbed by the Shafi'i and Hanbali schools respectively. Ibn Khaldun defined only three Sunni madhahib: Hanafi, Zahiri, and one encompassing the Shafi'i, Maliki, and Hanbali schools as existing initially, noting that by the 14th-century historian the Zahiri school had become extinct, only for it to be revived again in parts of the Muslim world by the mid-20th century.

Historically, the fiqh schools were often in political and academic conflict with one another, vying for favor with the ruling government in order to have their representatives appointed to legislative and especially judiciary positions.

=== Modern era ===
The transformations of Islamic legal institutions in the modern era have had profound implications for the madhhab system. Legal practice in most of the Muslim world has come to be controlled by government policy and state law, so that the influence of the madhhabs beyond personal ritual practice depends on the status accorded to them within the national legal system. State law codification commonly utilized the methods of takhayyur (selection of rulings without restriction to a particular madhhab) and talfiq (combining parts of different rulings on the same question). Legal professionals trained in modern law schools have largely replaced traditional ulama as interpreters of the resulting laws.

Global Islamic movements have at times drawn on different madhhabs and at other times placed greater focus on the scriptural sources rather than classical jurisprudence. The Hanbali school, with its particularly strict adherence to the Quran and Hadith, has inspired conservative currents of direct scriptural interpretation. In the 20th century many Islamic jurists began to assert their intellectual independence from traditional schools of jurisprudence. Examples of the latter approach include networks of Indonesian ulama and Islamic scholars residing in Muslim-minority countries, who have advanced liberal interpretations of Islamic law.

== Schools ==
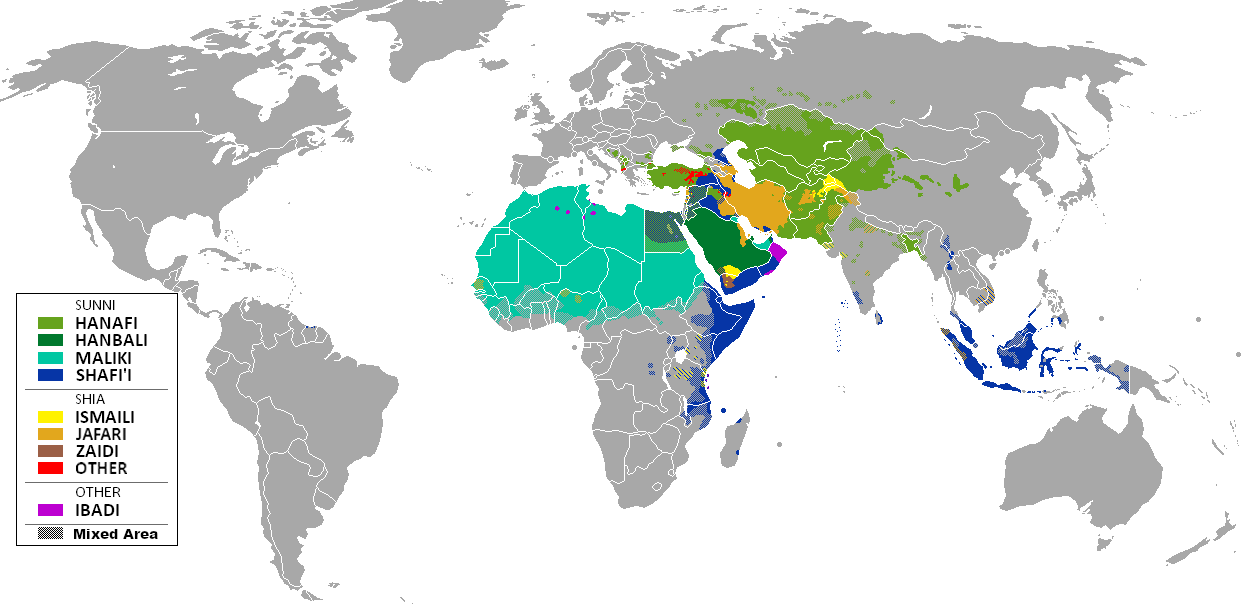
Some regions have a dominant or official madhhab; others recognize a variety.

Generally, Sunnis will follow one particular madhhab which varies from region to region, but also believe that ijtihad must be exercised by the contemporary scholars capable of doing so. Most rely on taqlid, or acceptance of religious rulings and epistemology from a higher religious authority in deferring meanings of analysis and derivation of legal practices instead of relying on subjective readings.

Experts and scholars of fiqh follow the principles of Islamic jurisprudence (usul) of their own madhhab, but they also study the usul, evidences, and opinions of other madhahib.

=== Sunni ===
The four main schools of jurisprudence of Sunni Islam are the Hanafi, Shafi'i, Maliki, and Hanbali schools. There is also the Zahiri school, but it has less followers. Historically, there were other schools of jurisprudence but they became extinct which include the Jariri, Awza'i, Laythi, and Thawri schools. The reason for the survival and dominance of the main schools was because of a number of factors including state support for specific scholars, dominance in debates and student numbers. Sunni schools take their name from the classical jurist who founded them.

==== Hanafi ====
The order of priority for deducing law by the Hanafi school is:

1. Quran
2. Sunnah
3. Ijma of the Sahabah
4. Individual opinions of the Sahabah
5. Qiyas
6. Istihsan
7. Urf

==== Maliki ====
The order of priority for deducing law by the Maliki school is:

1. Quran
2. Sunnah (unless it contradicts the 'Amal, then it is considered abrogated)
3. ʻAmal, the practice of the (majority of the) people of Medina
4. Ijma of the Sahabah
5. Individual opinion of the Sahabah
6. Qiyas
7. Istislah
8. Urf

==== Shafi'i ====
The order of priority for deducing law by the Shafi'i school is:

1. Quran
2. Sunnah
3. Ijma of the Sahabah
4. Individual opinions of the Sahabah
5. Qiyas

==== Hanbali ====
The order of priority for deducing law by the Hanbali school is:

1. Quran
2. Sunnah
3. Ijma of the Sahabah, but not the ijma after that period
4. Individual opinions of the Sahabah
5. Da'if Yasir Ahadith
6. Qiyas (last resort if none of the above are available)

==== Zahiri ====
The order of priority for deducing law by the Zahiri school is:

1. Quran
2. Sunnah
3. Ijmah of the Sahabah
4. Religious Inference (some scholars)
5. Sometimes even Qiyas Al jali (anti-hazm wing).

=== Shia ===
The Twelver school of jurisprudence is known as the Ja'fari school. The other two schools are the Zaydi and Ismaili schools.

==== Ja'fari ====
The Ja'fari school was named after the sixth Imam, Ja'far al-Sadiq. The order of priority for deducing law by the Ja'fari school is:

1. Quran
2. Sunnah
3. Ijtihad of the Imam

== See also ==
=== General links ===
- Glossary of Islam
- Outline of Islam
- Schools of Islamic theology
- Islamic schools and branches
- The four Sunni Imams
- Verse of Obedience

=== Terms ===
- Fiqh
- Sharia (Islamic law)
- Ikhtilaf
- Ijtihad
- Taqlid
- Ulu'l-amr
- Istihsan
- Qiyas
