= George of Resh'aina =

George of Resh'aina (Syriac: ܓܝܘܪܓܝ ܕܪܝܫ ܥܝܢܐ) was a 7th-century Syriac historian. He was opposed to Maximus the Confessor, the defender of orthodoxy against monotheletism and wrote an unfriendly biography of him. This book also provides a glimpse into the events of his time.

After Maximus went up to Rome, Arabs seized control of the islands of the sea and took over Cyprus and Arwad, ravaging them and taking captives. They gained control over Africa and subdued almost all the islands of the sea; for, following the wicked Maximus, the wrath of God punished every place which had accepted his error. When Maximus saw that Rome had accepted the foul mire of his blasphemies, he also went down to Constantinople at the time when Mu’awiya made peace with the emperor Constans, having started a war with Abu Turab, the emir of Hira, at Siffin and defeated him.
