= Doctrina Jacobi =

7th-century Christian Greek-language polemic against Judaism

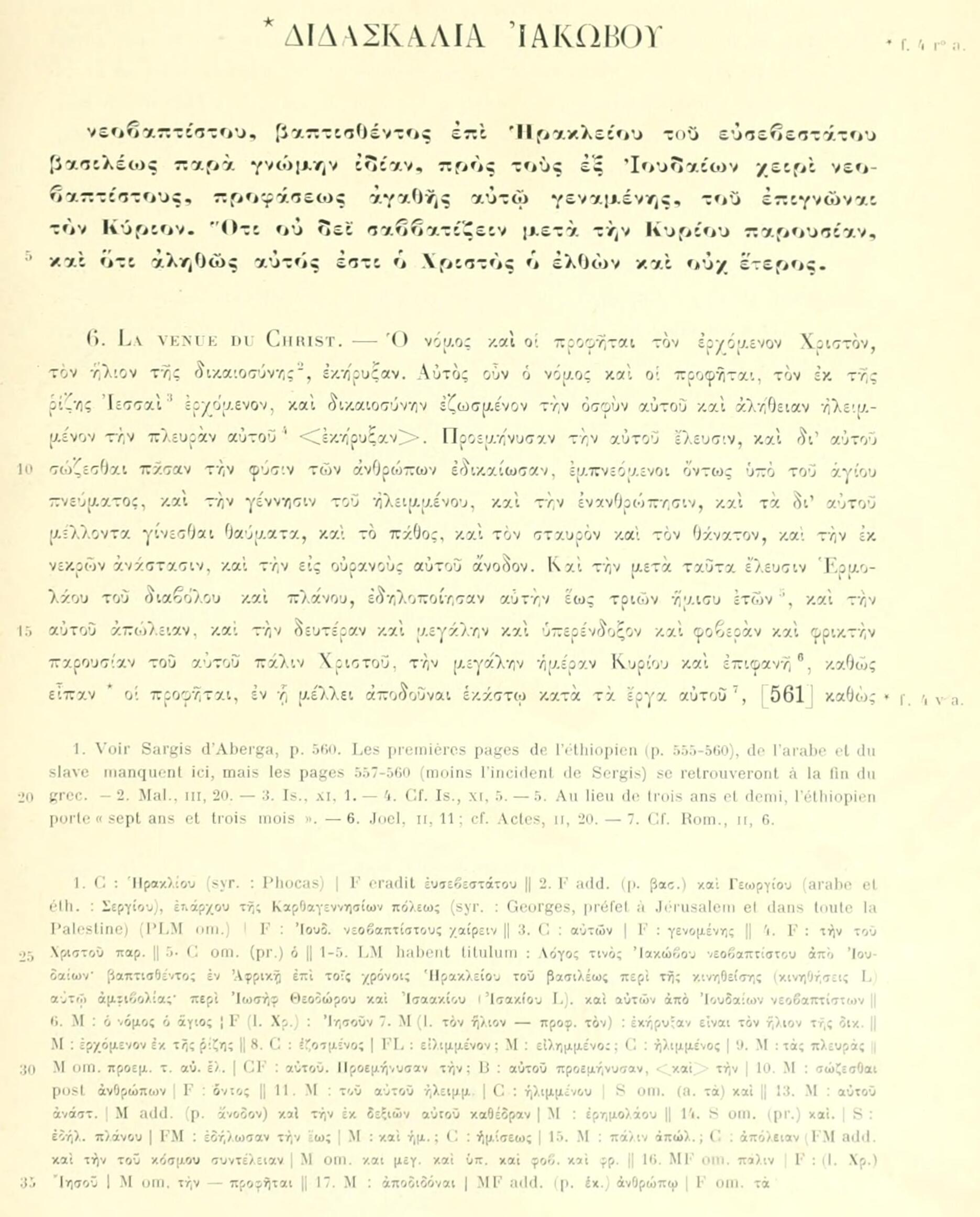
1907 Greek edition of Doctrina Jacobi, edited and annotated by François Nau

The Doctrina Jacobi (Note: Ancient Greek: Διδασκαλία Ἰακώβου, romanized: Didaskalia Iakobou; Latin: Doctrina Jacobi; Ge'ez: Sargis d'Aberga) is a Greek Christian polemical tract set in Carthage and written in Syria Palaestina. The composition of the document is generally dated to 634 or shortly afterwards. (Note: While some scholars, such as Sean W. Anthony and Déroche and Dagron have argued for datings several decades later, a majority agree with the c. 634 dating.)

It supposedly records a weeks-long discussion ending on July 13, 634, among Jews who have been forcibly baptized by order of the emperor. One of them, Jacob, has come to believe sincerely in Christianity; he instructs the rest about why they should also sincerely embrace their new faith. Halfway through, a Jewish merchant named Justus arrives and challenges Jacob to a debate. In the end, all of the participants are persuaded to embrace Christianity, and Jacob and Justus return east. In addition to several partial Greek manuscripts, the text survives in Latin, Arabic, Ethiopic and Slavonic translations.

== Content ==
The text provides one of the earliest external accounts of Islam, presenting a significantly different Islamic historiography than found in traditional Islamic texts. It also shows Jacob comparing the Byzantine Empire to the fourth beast of the prophecy of Daniel from Judeo-Christian eschatology. Although not unfamiliar imagery, it is part of a series of Byzantine literature, from the early stages of the Islamic religion, of trying to reconcile Islam with the apocalyptic vision. Further examples of this are contained in the pseudo-Athanasian's Quaestiones ad Antiochum ducem, and the Quaestiones et responsiones attributed to Anastasius of Sinai.

It records a prophet in Arabia who was waging war. According to Crone, who has presented a highly disputed account of the period, the document contradicts the notion in Islamic tradition that the prophet Muhammad was dead at the time of the conquest of Palestine but agrees with some traditions of other peoples of the time.

When the candidatus [i.e., Sergios, commander of the Byzantine army in Palestine] was killed by the Saracens, I was at Caesarea and I set off by boat to Sykamina. People were saying "the candidatus has been killed," and we Jews were overjoyed. And they were saying that the prophet had appeared, coming with the Saracens, and that he was proclaiming the advent of the anointed one, the Christ who was to come. I, having arrived at Sykamina, stopped by a certain old man well-versed in scriptures, and I said to him: "What can you tell me about the prophet who has appeared with the Saracens?" He replied, groaning deeply: "He is false, for the prophets do not come armed with a sword. Truly they are works of anarchy being committed today and I fear that the first Christ to come, whom the Christians worship, was the one sent by God and we instead are preparing to receive the Antichrist. Indeed, Isaiah said that the Jews would retain a perverted and hardened heart until all the earth should be devastated. But you go, master Abraham, and find out about the prophet who has appeared." So I, Abraham, inquired and heard from those who had met him that there was no truth to be found in the so-called prophet, only the shedding of men's blood. He says also that he has the keys of paradise, which is incredible.

=== Academic commentaries on the work ===
- "What is significant here is the possibility that Jews and Arabs (Saracens) seem to be allied together during the time of the conquest of Palestine and even for a short time after"
- "To be sure, the picture given in the Doctrina Iacobi seems garbled, and many of its details disagree with the traditional account (for example, in seeming to describe the prophet as leading the armies of the Saracens himself). ... Yet one could hardly expect a Byzantine source from this early and turbulent period to get all the details right. Even later, most Byzantine sources displayed gross misunderstanding of matters Islamic, just as Muslim sources generally did of matters Byzantine." – Colin Wells.
