= Robert G. Hoyland =

British medieval historian (born 1966)

Robert G. Hoyland (born 1966) is a historian, specializing in the medieval history of the Middle East. He was a student of historian Patricia Crone and was a Leverhulme Fellow at Pembroke College, Oxford. He is currently Professor of Late Antique and Early Islamic Middle Eastern History at New York University's Institute for the Study of the Ancient World, having previously been Professor of Islamic history at the University of Oxford's Faculty of Oriental Studies and a professor of history at the University of St. Andrews and UCLA.

== Research ==
Hoyland's best-known academic work Seeing Islam as Others Saw It is a contribution to early Islamic historiography, being a survey of non-Muslim eyewitness accounts of that period. Hoyland also authored In God's Path: The Arab Conquests and the Creation of an Islamic Empire (2014) in which he questions the traditional Islamic view of the Early Muslim conquests. According to Hoyland, Islam still had to evolve, so he prefers to call the conquests Arab rather than Islamic conquests.

== Publications ==
=== Books ===
- Seeing Islam as Others Saw it. A survey and analysis of the Christian, Jewish and Zoroastrian writings on Islam (Darwin; Princeton, 1997).
- Arabia and the Arabs: From the Bronze Age to the Coming of Islam (Routledge; London, 2001).
- Muslims and Others in early Islamic society (Ashgate; Aldershot, 2004).
- ed. with Dr. Philip Kennedy, Islamic Reflections and Arabic Musings (Oxbow; Oxford, 2004).
- with Brian Gilmour: Swords and Swordmakers in Medieval Islam (Oxbow; Oxford, 2004).
- with Simon Swain et al., Seeing the face, seeing the soul. The art of physiognomy in the Classical and Islamic Worlds (Oxford University Press, 2007).
- In God's Path: The Arab Conquests and the Creation of an Islamic Empire (Oxford University Press; Oxford, 2014).

=== Selected chapters and articles ===
- ‘The content and context of early Arabic inscriptions', Jerusalem Studies in Arabic and Islam 21 (1997).
- 'The earliest Christian writings on Muhammad: an appraisal' in H. Motzki ed., The Biography of Muhammad (Leiden, 2000).
- 'Epigraphy', 10,000-word entry in Encyclopaedia of the Qur'an (Leiden, 2002).
- ‘Language and Identity: the twin histories of Arabic and Aramaic', Scripta Israelica Classica 23 (2003).
- "History, Fiction and Authorship in the first centuries of Islam"; Writing and Representation in Medieval Islam; Julia Bray (ed); Routledge; 16-46 (2006)
- "New Documentary Texts and the Early Islamic State"; Bulletin of the School of Oriental and African Studies; 69(3):395-416 (2006)
- "Early Islam as a late antique religion"; The Oxford Handbook of Late Antiquity; Chapter 32 (2015)
