= Criticism of the Quran =

Criticism of Islam's holy book

Criticism of the Quran, the religious text held to be sacred by Islam, often concerns the text's factual accuracy, moral tenability, and supposed inerrancy claimed by ulemas. Muslims regard the Quran as the perfect verbatim word of God revealed to Muhammad.

In critical and historical study, scholars, such as John Wansbrough, Joseph Schacht, Patricia Crone, and Michael Cook, seek to investigate and verify the Quran's origin, text, composition, and history, examining questions, puzzles, difficult text, etc. as they would non-sacred ancient texts. Common criticisms concern the corruption of the oral and textual transmission at the origins, imperfect preservation, reliance on various pre-existing sources, internal inconsistency, lack of clarity, and questionable ethical teachings. The Quran's oral formation and written transmission, before and after Muhammad, have been questioned on the grounds of manuscript variants, the existence of numerous early contradictory narratives of how the Quran was composed, and early sources themselves discussing actual variants among even the followers of Muhammad. Early sources by non-Muslims indicate that there was no Quran at the time of Muhammad since early Christian and Jewish sources on Islam show no awareness of a Muslim scripture during the prophet's lifetime.

Sunni and Shia sects of Islam have competing and contradictory narratives of the origins of the Quran. Scholars argue that the earliest Muslims had a confusing understanding of Muhammad's message and that the emergence of multiple conflicting traditions exhibits many attempts to make sense of the chaos of composition, including examples of dependence on Christian and Jewish texts. No critical text of the Quran, based on manuscript analysis, has ever been made, and this is considered problematic since all other ancient and even sacred literature has been studied for accuracy. Textual critics state that based on the diversity found in the manuscript evidence, the editing after Muhammad's death, early purges of variants, early standardization attempts (e.g., 653–705 AD and 936 AD), along with other factors, lead to the view that there "never was one original text of the Quran."

== Historical authenticity ==
=== Traditional view ===
According to Islamic tradition, which criticism may question or contradict, the Quran followed a passage from heaven down to the angel Gabriel (Jibreel) who revealed it in the seventh century CE over 23 years to a Hejazi Arab trader and shepherd, Muhammad, who became one of the prophets of Islam. (Note: Muhammad relayed God's revelation to the early Muslims, and many of his contemporary nonbelievers/opponents maintained he (Muhammad) was the true origin of the Quran. Numerous verses of the Quran (Q.6:50, 7:203, 10:15, 10:37, 10:109, 13:38 and 33:2) vehemently deny that the Quran was Muhammad's own work, or that he was doing anything other than following what was revealed to him by God.) Muhammad shared these revelations—which brought uncompromising monotheism to humanity—with his companions, who wrote them down and/or memorized them. From these memories and scraps, a standard edition was carefully compiled and edited under the supervision of Caliph Uthman not long after Muhammad's death. Copies of this codex (or mus'haf) were sent to the major centers of what was by this time a rapidly expanding empire, and all other incomplete or "imperfect" variants of the Quranic revelation were ordered by Uthman to be destroyed. In the next few centuries, the religion and empire of Islam solidified, and an enormous body of religious literature and laws was developed, including commentaries/exegeses (tafsir) to explain the Quran.

Thus, according to Islamic teaching, it was ensured that the wording of the Quranic text available today corresponds exactly to the literal, infallible, "perfect", "timeless", "absolute", unadulterated word of God revealed to Muhammad. That revelation in turn is identical to an eternal "mother of the book," (Note: umm al-kitab,43:4 and 13:39), also "well-guarded tablet" (lawh mahfuz verse 85:22) and "concealed book" (kitab maknun 56:78)) the archetype of the Quran. In the Muslim religious and theological view, this was not created/written by God, but an attribute of him, co-eternal and kept with him, in heaven. (Note: As God's speech, the Quran was not created or written by God but is an "uncreated" attribute of God)

=== Muslim views of criticism ===
For Muslims, the contents of the Quran have been "a source of doctrine, law, poetic and spiritual inspiration, solace, zeal, knowledge, and mystical experience." According to Professor Emeritus of Islamic thought at the University of Paris, Algerian Mohammed Arkoun – "Millions and millions refer to the Koran daily to explain their actions and to justify their aspirations." In recent years, many consider it the source of scientific knowledge. Revered by pious Muslims as "the holy of holies", whose vary sound moves some to "tears and ecstasy", it is the physical symbol of the faith.

The traditional Muslim understanding of the Quran is not that it is simply divinely inspired, but the literal word of God. It is also the last and complete message from God, from his final messenger (Muhammad), superseding the Hebrew Bible; Christian Old Testament and New Testament; and purified the "accretions of Judaism and Christianity".

Traditional Islamic scholars have developed Quranic studies or "Quranic sciences" ('ulum al Quran) over the centuries, following the Quranic encouragement, "Will they not contemplate the Quran?".4:82 There are two types of exegesis used to explain and interpret the Quran:

- tafsir — a literal interpretation.
- ta'wil — an allegorical interpretations.

Other areas of study include:

- kalimat dakhila — the investigation of the foreign origin of some Quranic terms.
- naskh — studying contradictory verses to determine which should be abrogated in favor of the other. (Note: Naskh applies also to contradictory hadith, and to Quranic verses and hadith that contradict each other)
- occasions of revelation connecting Quranic verses with episodes of Muhammad's career based on hadith and biographies of him known as sira.
- Chronology of revelations.
- Division of quranic chapters (surahs) into Meccan surah.
  - Those believed to have been revealed in Mecca before the hijra.
  - Medinan surah revealed afterward in the city of Medina.

According to Seyyed Hossein Nasr, these traditional religious sciences:

" ...provide all the answers to questions posed by modern Western orientalists about the structure and text of the Koran, except, of course, those questions that issue from the rejection of the Divine Origin of the Koran and its reduction to a work by the prophet. Once the revealed nature of the Koran is rejected, then problems arise. But these are problems for orientalists that arise not from scholarship but from a certain theological and philosophical position, usually hidden under the guise of rationality and objectivity. For Muslims, there has never been the need to address these problems ..."

In contrast, many of the original non-Muslim scholars of the Quran worked "in the context of an openly declared hostility" between Christianity and Islam, to debunk Islam or proselytize against it. The nineteenth-century orientalist and colonial administrator William Muir wrote that the Quran was one of "the most stubborn enemies of Civilisation, Liberty, and the Truth which the world has yet known." In the twentieth century, scholars of the early Soviet Union working in the context of dialectical materialism and fighting the "opium of the people" argued:

- Muhammad and the first Caliphs were "mythical figures."
- The motive force of early Islam was the mercantile bourgeoisie of Mecca and Medina and slave-owning Arab society.

Partly as a reaction, some Muslims have fiercely opposed the "Orientalist enterprise of Qur'anic studies." In 1987, Muslim critic S. Parvez Manzoor denounced it as conceived in "the polemical marshes of medieval Christianity".

"At the greatest hour of his worldly triumph, the Western man, coordinating the powers of the State, Church and Academia, launched his most determined assault on the citadel of Muslim faith. All the aberrant streaks of his arrogant personality—its reckless rationalism, its world-domineering fantasy and its sectarian fanaticism—joined in an unholy conspiracy to dislodge the Muslim Scripture from its firmly entrenched position as the epitome of historic authenticity and moral unassailability."

Muslim scholars in the 21st century have cautioned against lending "legitimacy to non-Muslim scholars' understanding about Islam" by interacting with them. They point out that even a scholarly work on Islam such as the Brill Encyclopedia of Islam "... is filled with insults and disparaging remarks about the Quran."

Textual criticism of the Quran, especially the structure and style of the surahs, has been opposed on the grounds that it calls into question the Quran's divine origin. Seyyed Hossein Nasr has denounced the "rationalist and agnostic methods of higher criticism" as similar to dissecting and subjecting Jesus to "modern medical techniques to determine whether he was born miraculously or was the son of Joseph."

In his influential Orientalism, Edward Said declared Western study of the Middle East — including the religion of Islam — inextricably tied to Western Imperialism, making the study inherently political and servile to power.

These complaints have been compared to those of other religious conservatives (Christian) against textual historical criticism of their own sacred text (the Bible).

- Biblical scholar John Burgon (1813–1888)wrote: "The Bible is none other than the voice of Him that sitteth upon the Throne! Every Book of it, every Chapter of it, every Verse of it, every word of it, every syllable of it ... every letter of it, is the direct utterance of the Most High!"
- Non-Muslim scholar Patricia Crone acknowledges the call for humility toward the sacred of other cultures — "who are you to tamper with their legacy?" — but defends the challenging of orthodox views of Islamic history, saying, "we Islamicists are not trying to destroy anyone's faith."

Not all Muslims oppose criticism. Roslan Abdul-Rahim writes, "... critical study of the Quran will not hurt the Muslims ... it will only help them because no amount of criticism can change that fact that the Quran is truly a divine piece of work as the Muslim theology stipulates and as the Muslims have so strongly defended".

However, some scholars have suffered for attempting to apply literary or philological techniques to the Quran:

- Egyptian "Dean of Arabic Literature" Taha Husain, who lost his post at Cairo University in 1931. Husain published a book (Fi'ish-Shi-r al-Jahili) questioning the historical veracity of the Quran. He was "charged with blasphemy, forced to withdraw his book, and lost his university post"
- Egyptian professor Mohammad Ahmad Khalafallah, whose dissertation was rejected.
- Non-Muslim German professor Günter Lüling (dismissed),
- Egyptian professor Nasr Abu Zaid, who was forced to seek exile in Europe after being declared an apostate and threatened with death for violating a "right of God".
- Jewish professor and Arab scholar Suliman Bashear argued that Islam developed as a religion gradually rather than emerging fully formed from the mouth of the Prophet. He was injured after being thrown from a second-story window by his students at the University of Nablus in the West Bank.

==== Non-Muslim views ====
Not all non-Muslim scholars of Islam are interested in critical examination and analysis. Patricia Crone and Ibn al-Rawandi argue that Western scholarship lost its critical attitude towards the sources of Islam's origins around the time of the First World War. Andrew Rippin has expressed surprise that:

"for students acquainted with approaches such as source criticism, oral-formulaic composition, literary analysis, and structuralism, all quite commonly employed in the study of Judaism and Christianity, such naive historical study seems to suggest that Islam is being approached with less than academic candor."

Some scholars like Karl Binswanger have complained about "dogmatic Islamophilia of most Arabists". French philosopher Jacques Ellul points out that in one Western country (France as of 1983) "it is no longer acceptable to criticize Islam or the Arab countries." French historian Maxime Rodinson states that among some historians, like Middle Ages historian Norman Daniel, their understanding of Islam "has given way to apologetics pure and simple."

In the 1970s, what has been described as a "wave of skeptical scholars" challenged much of the wisdom in Islamic studies. Their argument was that the Islamic historical tradition had suffered considerable corruption in its transmission. Also, there was a lack of supporting evidence consistent with the traditional narrative, including archaeological evidence. Finally, non-Muslim literary sources showed inconsistencies. Efforts were made to revise or reconstruct the initial narrative of Islam using alternative, likely more reliable, sources such as coins, inscriptions, and non-Islamic records.

=== Creating a uniform Quran ===
"The Prophet died, and the Qur'an had not been assembled into a single place."

— Ibn Hajar al-Asqalani

Scholars disagree on the timing of the first collection of verses for the compilation of a written Quran. Some have suggested it began under Caliph Abu Bakr.

Others, like Zayd ibn Thabit reported, "... the first of those to collect the Quran into a mushaf (codex) was Salim, the freed slave of Abu Hudhaifah." Also contributing to the discussion, Ali reportedly said "May the mercy of Allah be upon Abu Bakr, the foremost of men to be rewarded with the collection of the manuscripts, for he was the first to collect (the text) between (two) covers."

Caliph Uthman (644–656) oversaw the final efforts to standardize the Quran into an official, unified text using a single dialect. The project started 12 years after Muhammad's death and concluded 24 years after its initiation. Upon the project's completion, all other existing personal, individual copies, and dialects of the Quran were ordered to be destroyed:

"When they had copied the sheets, Uthman sent a copy to each of the main centres of the empire with the command that all other Quran materials, whether in single sheet form, or in whole volumes, were to be burned."

— John Burton and Ibn Hajar al-Asqalani

It's traditionally thought that the first writings benefited from being reviewed by individuals who had memorized them. These early writers acquired the knowledge during the revelation and subsequently recited it continuously. Since the official compilation was completed two decades after Muhammad's death, the Uthman text has been scrupulously preserved. Doctor Maurice Bucaille felt that this posed no issues for the Quran's validity.

=== Qira'at and Ahruf ===
Evolution of early Arabic script (9th–11th century), with the Basmala as an example, from kufic Quran manuscripts: ① Early 9th century, script with no dots or diacritic marks ② and ③ 9th–10th century under the Abbasid dynasty, Abu al-Aswad's system established red dots with each arrangement or position indicating a different short vowel; later, a second black-dot system was used to differentiate between letters like fā' and qāf ④ In the 11th century, in al-Farāhidi's system (the system used today), dots were changed into shapes resembling the letters to transcribe the corresponding long vowels.

Although Caliph Uthman worked to standardize the Quran, many Muslims maintain that —

"it exists exactly as it had been revealed to the Prophet; not a word - nay, not a dot of it - has been changed"

— Abul A'la Maududi

Despite these efforts, the Quran has ten recognized recitations known as Qira'at. In the early centuries of Islam, the ten Qira'at were canonized by Islamic scholars. Before this time, the text could be interpreted in multiple ways. Even with written text, most vowels were frequently left out, and many consonants were not differentiated. Thus, while in theory Qira'at include differences in consonantal diacritics (i'jām), vowel marks (ḥarakāt), but not the consonantal skeleton (rasm), (which should be uniform in all Qira'at), there are differences in (rasm) resulting in materially different readings (see below).

Presently, Qira'at has its own text in modern Arabic script. You can find most types that are not commonly used inside an English PDF. As a result, although the differences between the Qira'at are slight, only one of the ten is commonly used. Even after centuries of Islamic scholarship, the variants of the Qira'at have continued "to astound and puzzle" Islamic scholars and make up "the most difficult topics" in Quranic studies according to Abu Ammaar Yasir Qadhi. (Note: "every single student of knowledge knows who studies ulm of Quran that the most difficult topics are ahruf and qira'at and the concept of ahruf and the reality of ahruf and the relationship of ...... mushaf and the ahruf and the preservation of ahruf, is it one? is it three? Is it seven? and the relationship of the qira'at to the ahruf ...")

Qira'at should not be confused with Tajwid, which deals with Quranic pronunciation, intonation, and caesuras. Both coexisted because, before the various attempts to standardize the Quran, Muhammad's teachings were an oral tradition.

In addition to the Qira'at, the Ahruf also exist. The Quran is the source for both these recitations, and they originate directly from the oral traditions of Muhammad. Yet, it bears mentioning that in the 7th century CE, caliph Uthman's effort to unify the Quran led to the removal of all Ahruf except one.

Today, the Mushaf Quran is in general use across nearly 95% of the Muslim world. It is based on the 1924 Egyptian edition Qira'at reading of Hafs on the authority of Asim, i.e., Ḥafṣ being the Rāwī, or transmitter, and Asim being the Qāriʾ or reader. The differences between the readings go beyond pronunciation into consonants and meaning.

Examples of differences between two Qira'at:

Ḥafṣ ʿan ʿĀṣim and Warš ʿan Nāfiʿ for eight verses

Ḥafṣ (translation)	Warš (translation)	verse
يَعْمَلُونَ (you do)	تَعْمَلُونَ (they do)	Al-Baqara 2:85
مَا نُنَزِّلُ (We do not send down...)	مَا تَنَزَّلُ (they do not come down...)	Al-Ḥijr 15:8
لِأَهَبَ (that I may bestow)	لِيَهَبَ (that He may bestow)	Maryam 19:19 (Note: While the difference cannot always be rendered with screen fonts, in order to comply with the Uthmanic rasm, the readings of Warsh an Nafi and of Abu 'Amr were written using a superscript ya over the alif, or by a red line between the lam-alif and ha to indicate that hamza should not be pronounced, or by writing a ya in coloured ink. See the discussions in Reynolds' book, New Perspectives on the Qur'an: The Qur'an in its Historical Context 2 and page 15 of Dutton's manuscript, Red Dots, Green Dots, Yellow Dots and Blue: Some Reflections on the Vocalisation of Early Qur'anic Manuscripts (Part II))
قَالَ (he said)	قُل (Say!)	Al-Anbiyā' 21:4
كَبِيرًا (mighty)	كَثِيرًا (multitudinous)	Al-Aḥzāb 33:68
فَبِمَا (then it is what)	بِمَا (it is what)	Al-Shura 42:30
يُدْخِلْهُ (He makes him enter)	نُدْخِلْهُ (We make him enter)	Al-Fatḥ 48:17
عِبَٰدُ (who are the slaves of the Beneficent)	عِندَ (who are with the Beneficent)	al-Zukhruf 43:19

While changes in voice or pronouns in these verses may seem confusing, they are very common in the Quran and is found even in the same verse. (It is known as iltifāt.)

- Q.2:85 The "you" in Hafs refers to the actions of more than one person, and the "they" in Warsh also refers to the actions of more than one person.
- Q.15:8 "We" refers to God in Hafs, and the "They" in Warsh refers to what is not being sent down by God (The Angels).
- Q.19:19 (li-ʾahaba v. li-yahaba) is a well-known difference, both for the theological interest in the alternative pronouns said to have been uttered by the angel, and for requiring unusual orthography.
- Q.48:17, the "He" in Hafs is referring to God, and the "We" in Warsh is also referring to God; this is due to the fact that God refers to Himself in both the singular form and plural form by using the royal "We".
- Q.43:19 shows an example of a consonantal dotting difference that gives a different root word, in this case ʿibādu v. ʿinda.

The second set of examples below compares the other canonical readings with those of Hafs and Asim. These are not nearly as widely read today, though all are available in print and studied for recitation.

There is a Hadith related by al-Tabari minimizing confusion over Qira'at or Ahruf. Tabari begins his commentary on the Quran by noting that the exact method of interpreting its verses was not predetermined, even during Muhammad's time.

"Two men disputing a verse in the text asked Ubay ibn Ka'b to mediate, but he disagreed with them and proposed a third reading. To resolve the question, the three went to Muhammad. He asked the first man to read the verse and announced it was correct. He made the same response when the second alternative reading was delivered. He then asked Ubay to provide his own recital, and, on hearing the third version, Muhammad also pronounced it - "Correct!" Noting Ubay's perplexity and inner thoughts, Muhammad then told him, "Pray to God for protection from the accursed Satan."

=== Extant copies prior to Uthman version ===
==== Sanaa manuscript ====
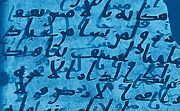
Manuscripts found in Sanaa. The "subtexts" revealed by UV light are different from today's Quran. Gerd R. Puin believed this to mean an evolving text. A similar phrase is used by Lawrence Conrad for biography of Muhammad. According to his studies, the Islamic scientific view of Muhammad's date of birth from the second century A.H. showed a range of 85 years.

In 1972, a cache of 12,000 ancient Quranic parchment fragments was discovered in a mosque in Sanaa, Yemen – commonly known as the Sanaa manuscripts. A 2026 University of Hamburg release counts 929 Quran manuscripts from the 7th to 11th centuries among them.

The manuscript is a palimpsest and comprises two layers of text, both written in the Hijazi script. The upper text largely conforms to the standard 'Uthmanic' Quran in text and in the standard order of chapters (suwar, singular sūrah), whereas the lower text (the original text that was erased and written over by the upper text, but can still be read with the help of ultraviolet light and computer processing) contains many variations from the standard Uthmanic text, and the sequence of its chapters corresponds to no known Quranic order.

For example, in Surah 2, verse 87, the lower text has wa-qaffaynā 'alā āthārihi whereas the standard text has wa-qaffaynā min ba'dihi. The Sanaa manuscript has exactly the same verses and the same order of verses as the standard Quran. The order of the suras in the Sanaa codex differs from the order in the standard Quran. Such variants are similar to the ones reported for the Quran codices of Companions such as Ibn Masud and Ubay ibn Ka'b. However, variants occur much more frequently in the Sanaa codex, which contains "by a rough estimate perhaps twenty-five times as many [as Ibn Mas'ud's reported variants]".

On the basis of studies of the trove of Quranic manuscripts discovered in Sanaa, Gerd R. Puin concluded that the Quran as we have it is a "cocktail of texts," some perhaps predating Muhammad's day, and that the text evolved. However, other scholars, such as Asma Hilali presumed that the Sanaa palimpsest seems to be written down by a learning scribe as a form of "exercise" in the context of a "school exercise", which explains a potential reason of variations in this text from the standard Quran Mushafs available today. Another way to explain these variations is that Sanaa manuscript may have been part of a surviving copy of Quranic Mus'haf which escaped the 3rd caliph Uthman's attempt to destroy all the dialects (Ahruf) of Quran except the Quraishi one (in order to unite the Muslims of that time).

==== Birmingham/Paris manuscript ====
The early Arabic script transcribed 28 consonants, of which only 6 can be readily distinguished; the remaining 22 share formal similarities, so the specific consonant intended can only be determined by context. It was only with the introduction of Arabic diacritics some centuries later that an authorized vocalization of the text and its reading were established and became canonical.

In 2015, the University of Birmingham disclosed that Radiocarbon dating showed the Birmingham Quran manuscripts to be among the oldest known texts of its kind. Those tests by the Oxford Radiocarbon Accelerator Unit indicated, with a probability of more than 94 percent, that the parchment dated from 568 CE to 645 CE. Muhammad is thought to have lived between 570 CE and 632 CE. Thus, it is presumed the text was written around the time of Muhammad's life or immediately after.

Those findings led Joseph E. B. Lumbard, Professor of Classical Islam, to comment:

"These recent empirical findings are of fundamental importance. They establish that, with regard to the broad outlines of the history of the compilation and codification of the Quranic text, the classical Islamic sources are far more reliable than had hitherto been assumed. Such findings thus render the vast majority of Western revisionist theories regarding the historical origins of the Quran untenable."

— Joseph E. B. Lumbard

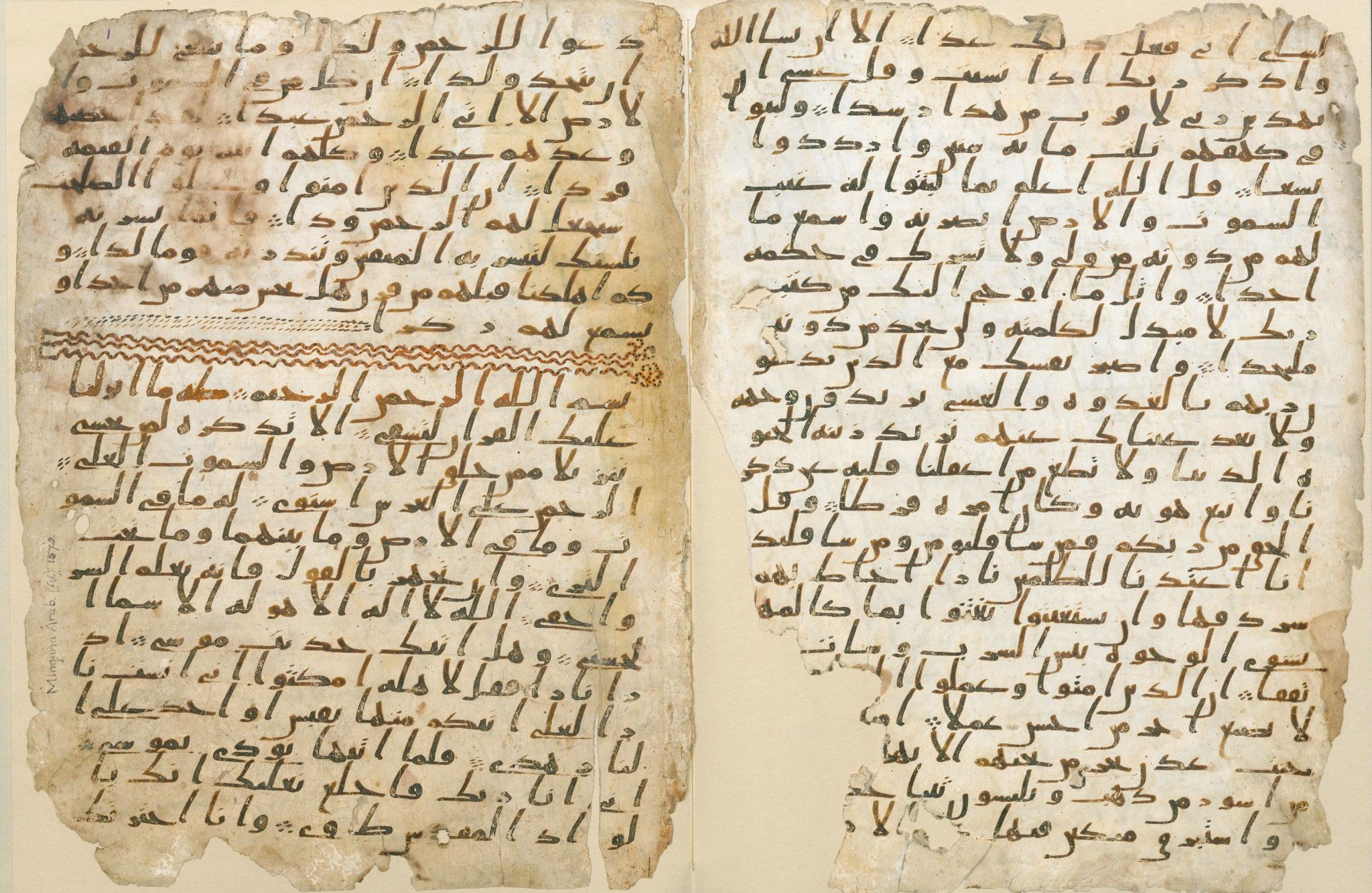
A Qur'anic manuscript dating back to the seventh century CE in the Birmingham University Manuscripts and Documents Collection.

In December 2015, François Déroche of the Collège de France said the two Birmingham leaves were those of the Paris Quran BnF Arabe 328(c), as had been proposed by Alba Fedeli. Deroche expressed reservations about the reliability of the radiocarbon dates proposed for the Birmingham leaves, noting instances elsewhere in which radiocarbon dating had proved inaccurate in testing Qurans with an explicit endowment date, and also that none of the counterpart Paris leaves had yet been carbon-dated. Jamal bin Huwaireb, managing director of the Mohammed bin Rashid Al Maktoum Foundation, has proposed that, were the radiocarbon dates to be confirmed, the Birmingham/Paris Qur'an might be identified with the text known to have been assembled by the first Caliph, Abu Bakr, between 632 and 634 CE.

Doctor Saud al-Sarhan, Director of Center for Research and Islamic Studies in Riyadh, questions whether the parchment might have been reused as a palimpsest. He pointed out that the manuscripts included chapter separators and dotted verse endings — characteristics of Arabic scripts that are thought to have appeared in the Quran at a much later stage.

Al-Sarhan's criticisms were supported by several Saudi-based experts in Quranic history, who said that the Birmingham Quran could not have been written during Muhammad's lifetime. They claim that, while Muhammad was alive, Quranic texts were written without chapter divisions, verse markers, or coloured inks, and did not follow any standard sequence of surahs. They said that those features were introduced into Quranic practice in the time of the Caliph Uthman, and so the Birmingham leaves could have been written later, but not earlier.

Professor Süleyman Berk of the faculty of Islamic studies at Yalova University said there is a strong similarity between the script of the Birmingham leaves and those of a number of Hijazi Qurans in the Turkish and Islamic Arts Museum, which were brought to Istanbul from the Great Mosque of Damascus following a fire in 1893. Berk said that these manuscripts had been intensively researched in association with an exhibition on the history of the Quran, The Quran in its 1,400th Year held in Istanbul in 2010, and that the findings were published by François Déroche as Qur'ans of the Umayyads in 2013. In that study, the Paris Quran, BnF Arabe 328(c), is compared with Qurans in Istanbul, and concluded as having been written: "around the end of the seventh century and the beginning of the eighth century."

=== Further research and findings ===
"For, our attempt to date the relevant traditional material confirms on the whole the conclusions which Schacht arrived at from another field, specifically the tendency of isnads to grow backward."

— Suliman Bashear

Research into historical events and eyewitness accounts shows traditionalists later promoted the centrist idea of Mecca and prophetic lineage from Ismail for nationalistic reasons. This effort gave Islam's emerging religious identity a Hijazi emphasis.

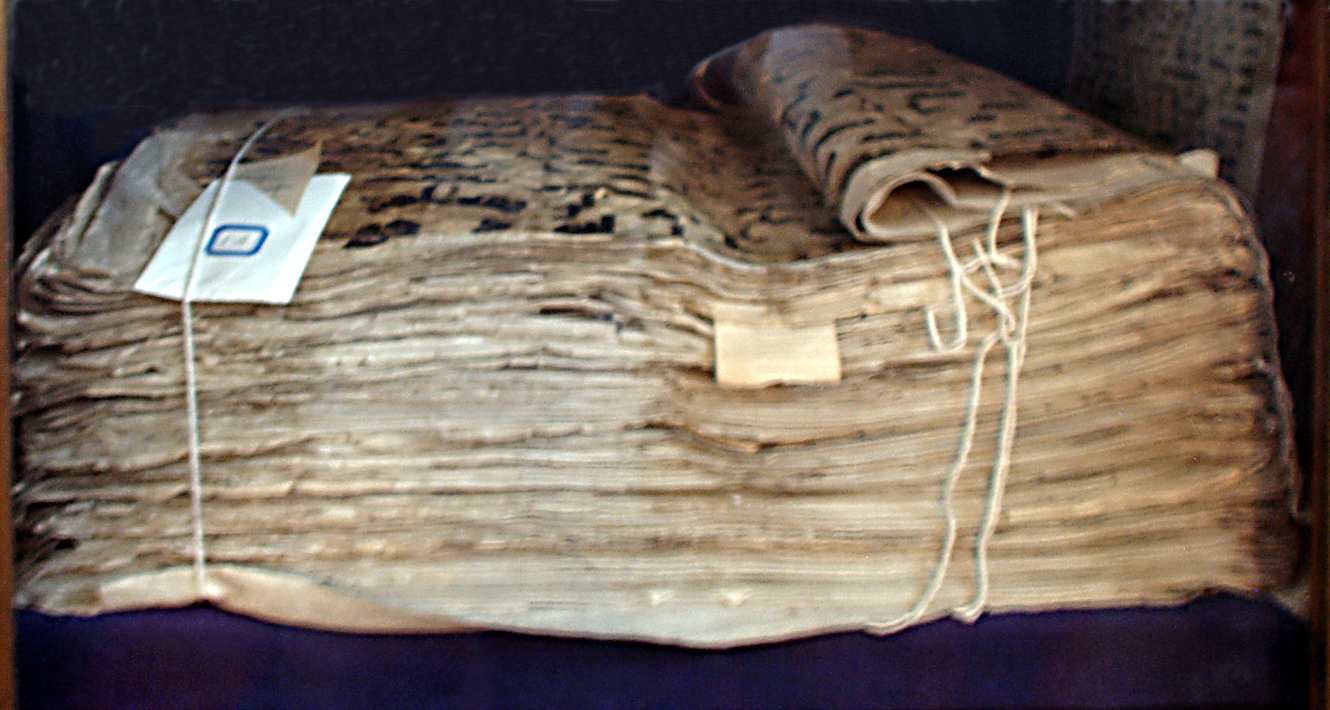
Quran from the 9th century. It was alleged to be a 7th-century original from Uthman era.

Published before the new discoveries of early Quranic material, Hagarism: The Making of the Islamic World (1977) by historians Patricia Crone and Michael Cook questioned the conventional explanation of how the Quran was compiled. They observed that "there is no hard evidence for the existence of the Koran in any form before the last decade of the seventh century." The argument by Cook, Crone, and Gerd R. Puin is that all primary sources are separated from the events they document by 150 to 300 years, indicating a significant chronological gap.

It is generally acknowledged that the work of Crone and Cook represented a fresh approach to the reconstruction of early Islamic history, but the theory has been almost universally rejected.

- John van Ess states: "a refutation is perhaps unnecessary since the authors make no effort to prove it in detail ... Where they are only giving a new interpretation of well-known facts, this is not decisive. But where the accepted facts are consciously put upside down, their approach is disastrous."
- Robert Bertram Serjeant writes: "... is not only bitterly anti-Islamic in tone, but anti-Arabian. Its superficial fancies are so ridiculous that at first one wonders if it is just a 'leg pull', pure 'spoof'."
- Francis Edward Peters observes: "Few have failed to be convinced that what is in our copy of the Quran is, in fact, what Muhammad taught, and is expressed in his own words."

In 2006, legal scholar Liaquat Ali Khan claimed that Crone and Cook later explicitly disavowed their earlier book. Patricia Crone, in a 2006 article, provided an update on the evolution of her conceptions since the printing of the thesis in 1976. In the article, she acknowledges that Muhammad existed as a historical figure and that the Quran represents "utterances" of his that he believed were revelations. However, she states that the Quran may not be the complete record of the revelations. She also accepts that oral histories and Muslim historical accounts cannot be totally discounted, but remains skeptical about the traditional account of the Hijrah and the standard view that Muhammad and his tribe were based in Mecca. She describes the difficulty in handling the hadith because of their "amorphous nature" and their purpose as documentary evidence for deriving religious law rather than as historical narratives.

According to Abd al-Masih ibn Ishaq al-Kindi, an Arab Christian scholar and writer (distinct from the famous philosopher al-Kindi), the narratives found in the Quran were "all jumbled together and intermingled ... evidence that many different hands have been at work therein, and caused discrepancies, adding or cutting out whatever they liked or disliked".

In line with Bell and Watt's research, the Quran's varied writing style and occasional rhymes could indicate revisions made during its compilation. They asserted that:

- "abrupt changes in the length of verses; sudden changes of the dramatic situation, with changes of pronoun from singular to plural, from second to third person, and so on."
- "if any great changes by way of addition, suppression or alteration had been made, controversy would almost certainly have arisen; but of that there is little trace."
- "Modern study of the Quran has not in fact raised any serious question of its authenticity. The style varies, but is almost unmistakable."

== Questions about history and origins ==
"If men and Jinn banded together to produce the like of this Qur'an they would never produce its like, not though they backed one another.17:8"

— Tanzil

=== Questions about the text ===
The Quran states its revelations are: — miraculous signs ... inimitable (I'jaz) in their eloquence and perfection and proof of the authenticity of Muhammad's prophethood.

The following verses show the Quran's revelations:

- 2:2
- 17:88-89
- 29:47
- 28:49

In several passages, the Quran's verses are said to offer clarity.

- 11:1
- 6:114
- 16:89
- 41:3

Additionally, they note that some verses are perceived as somewhat ambiguous, but are "pure and clear" Arabic language Quran 16:101–103 ^{(Pickthall)} Another way to rationalize somewhat obscure verses is "none knows its hidden meanings save Allah".^{[Quran 3:7]} Most Muslims believe some quranic verses have been abrogated (naskh) by others, but that these verses and others have been revealed in response to questions from followers or opponents.

American folklorist Alan Dundes points out that the Quran itself denies that there can be errors within it, "If it were from other than Allah, they would surely have found in it many contradictions."^{[Quran 4:82]}

However, not all early Muslims agreed with this consensus.

- Muslim-turned-skeptic Ibn al-Rawandi (827 –920 CE) dismissed the Quran as "not the speech of someone with wisdom, containing contradictions, errors and absurdities,"
- According to critic Abu Hatim Ahmad ibn Hamdan al-Razi), 10th-century physician and polymath Muhammad ibn Zakariya al-Razi (c. 864 – c. 935 CE) responded to the claim the Quran is a miracle by writing,
  You claim that the evidentiary miracle is present and available, namely, the Koran. You say: "Whoever denies it, let him produce a similar one." Indeed, we shall produce a thousand similar, from the works of rhetoricians, eloquent speakers and valiant poets, which are more appropriately phrased and state the issues more succinctly. They convey the meaning better, and their rhymed prose is in better meter. ... By God, what you say astonishes us! You are talking about a work that recounts ancient myths, and which at the same time is full of contradictions and does not contain any useful information or explanation. Then you say: "Produce something like it"?!

Early Western scholars also often attacked the Quran's literary merit.

- According to Edward Said, Orientalist Thomas Carlyle considered Muhammad a man of real vision and self-conviction, but called the Quran — "toilsome reading and a wearisome confused jumble, crude, incondite" with "endless iterations, long-windedness, entanglement" and "insupportable stupidity".
- Salomon Reinach wrote in his book, "From the literary point of view, the Koran has little merit. Declamation, repetition, puerility, a lack of logic and coherence strike the unprepared reader at every turn. It is humiliating to the human intellect to think that this mediocre literature has been the subject of innumerable commentaries, and that millions of men are still wasting time absorbing it."

More specifically, "peculiarities" in the text have been alleged.

- Iranian rationalist and scholar Ali Dashti points out that before its perfection became an issue of Islamic doctrine, early Muslim scholar Ibrahim al-Nazzam(c. 775 – c. 836 CE) "openly acknowledged that the arrangement and syntax" of the Quran was less than 'miraculous.' Dashti also states that "more than one hundred aberrations from the normal rules and structure of Arabic have been noted in the Quran."
  "... sentences which are incomplete and not fully intelligible without the aid or commentaries; foreign words, unfamiliar Arabic words, and words used with other than the normal meaning; adjectives and verbs inflected without observance of the concords of gender and number; illogically and ungrammatically applied pronouns which sometimes have no referent; and predicates which in rhymed passages are often remote from the subjects."
- Scholar Gerd R. Puin puts the number of unclear verses much higher:

"The Koran claims for itself that it is 'mubeen,' or 'clear,' but if you look at it, you will notice that every fifth sentence or so simply doesn't make sense. Many Muslims—and Orientalists—will tell you otherwise, of course, but the fact is that a fifth of the Koranic text is just incomprehensible. This is what has caused the traditional anxiety regarding translation. If the Koran is not comprehensible—if it can't even be understood in Arabic—then it's not translatable. People fear that. And since the Koran claims repeatedly to be clear but obviously is not—as even speakers of Arabic will tell you—there is a contradiction. Something else must be going on."

- Scholar of the Semitic languages Theodor Nöldeke(1836–1930) collected a large quantity of morphological and syntactic grammatical forms in the Quran that "do not enter into the general linguistic system of Arabic."

=== Obscure words and phrases ===
According to journalist and scholar Toby Lester, the Quran "sometimes makes dramatic shifts in style, voice, and subject matter from verse to verse, and it assumes a familiarity with language, stories, and events that seem to have been lost even to the earliest of Muslim exegetes."

The Quran is known to contain a number of words whose meanings are unclear, for which Muslim commentators (and Western scholars) have created "a welter of competing guesses." The following table displays some examples of ambiguous terms.

◆ Examples of Quranic equivocal terms ◆
Term	Verse	Exact Quote	Meaning	Source
ābb	^{[Quran 80:31 (Translated by Yusuf Ali)]}	And fruits and fodder,-	possible meaning "pasture	
an yadin	^{[Quran 9:29]}	Fight those who believe not in Allah nor the Last Day, nor hold that forbidden which hath been forbidden by Allah and His Messenger, nor acknowledge the religion of Truth, (even if they are) of the People of the Book, until they pay the Jizya with willing submission, and feel themselves subdued.	usually translated as "out of hand" as a means of payment, but what this means has not been agreed upon	
ar-raqim	^{[Quran 18:9]}	Or dost thou reflect that the Companions of the Cave and of the Inscription were wonders among Our Sign?	guesses by exegetes include "books", "inscription", "tablet", "rock", "numbers", or "building", or a proper name for "a village, or a valley, a mountain, or even a dog"	
Ghislīn	^{[Quran 69:36]}	Nor hath he any food except the corruption from the washing of wounds	unknown. guess: "what exudes from the bodies of the inmates" of Hell.	
Iram	^{[Quran 89:7]}	Of the (city of) Iram, with lofty pillars	unknown. foreign word, possibly a name of city or country	
Jibt	^{[Quran 4:51]}	Hast thou not turned Thy vision to those who were given a portion of the Book? they believe in sorcery and Evil, and say to the Unbelievers that they are better guided in the (right) way Than the believers!	no explanation has been found; guesses include idol, priest, sorcerer, sorcery, satan, or whatnot.	
kalāla	^{[Quran 4:11-12]}	11 - Allah (thus) directs you as regards your Children's (Inheritance): to the male, a portion equal to that of two females: if only daughters, two or more, their share is two-thirds of the inheritance; if only one, her share is a half. For parents, a sixth share of the inheritance to each, if the deceased left children; if no children, and the parents are the (only) heirs, the mother has a third; if the deceased Left brothers (or sisters) the mother has a sixth. (The distribution in all cases ('s) after the payment of legacies and debts. Ye know not whether your parents or your children are nearest to you in benefit. These are settled portions ordained by Allah; and Allah is All-knowing, Al-wise. 12 - In what your wives leave, your share is a half, if they leave no child; but if they leave a child, ye get a fourth; after payment of legacies and debts. In what ye leave, their share is a fourth, if ye leave no child; but if ye leave a child, they get an eighth; after payment of legacies and debts. If the man or woman whose inheritance is in question has left neither ascendants nor descendants, but has left a brother or a sister, each one of the two gets a sixth; but if more than two, they share in a third; after payment of legacies and debts; so that no loss is caused (to any one). Thus is it ordained by Allah; and Allah is All-knowing, Most Forbearing.		
qaḍb	^{[Quran 80:28 (Translated by Yusuf Ali)]}	And Grapes and nutritious plants	possible meaning "green herbs" of some kind	
Qurbān	^{[Quran 46:28]}	Why then was no help forthcoming to them from those whom they worshipped as gods, besides Allah, as a means of access (to Allah)? Nay, they left them in the lurch: but that was their falsehood and their invention.	evidently means "sacrifice", but maybe "favorites of a prince" or then again "a means of access to God"	
ṣābiʿīn	^{[Quran 2:62]}	Those who believe (in the Qur'an), and those who follow the Jewish (scriptures), and the Christians and the Sabians,- any who believe in Allah and the Last Day, and work righteousness, shall have their reward with their Lord; on them shall be no fear, nor shall they grieve.		
samad	^{[Quran 112:2]}	Allah, the Eternal, Absolute		
sijjīl	^{[Quran 105:4]}	Striking them with stones of baked clay		

Historian Michael Cook argues that even more obscure words exist than are currently acknowledged by citing these examples:

- ilaf ^{[Quran 106:1–2]} — The current definition in 2026, according to the "quran.com" website, is the word Ilaf (إيلاف), "often transliterated as Eilaf or Ilaaf, is an Arabic term that translates to 'familiarity,' 'habituation,' 'accord,' or 'bringing together in harmony and security'." (Note: Ilaf is famously mentioned in the Quran in Surah Al-Quraysh (Chapter 106). The opening verse, "Li-ilafi Quraysh," refers to the covenants of security, harmony, and familiarization that allowed the Quraysh tribe of Mecca to safely conduct their winter and summer trade caravans. It serves as a reminder to be grateful for Allah's provision of safety and sustenance.)

Cook understood the term to mean "For the accustomed security of the Quraysh - their accustomed security in the caravan of winter and summer." Thus, ilaf was meant to refer to local tribal protection arrangements ("accustomed security"). He also said there was uncertainty about how to read the vowels in ilaf or how the term was defined. As such, Cook questioned whether it was a cursory reference to Mecca's basic commerce, or whether the hadith about the two caravans (many of which were known to be fabricated) was made up to explain Quranic passages whose meaning was otherwise unclear.

- Rihla — Riḥla (Arabic: رحلة) refers to both a journey and the written account of that journey, or travelogue. However, Cook points out — according to hadith, the foundation of Mecca's trade was two annual commercial caravans by the Quraysh tribe from Mecca to Yemen and back in the winter and another to Syria in the summer. But the Arabic word rihla simply means journey, not commercial travel or caravan.

Some explanations include that "God is making the point that he knows something we don't ^{[Quran 101:1–11]}" or that in some cases the words are used simply to rhyme a verse.

==== Arabic words ====
Several verses state the Quran is revealed in Arabic — pure and clear.

The critic Ibn Warraq made the following observation in his 1995 book, Why I Am Not a Muslim:

- The scholar al-Suyuti (1445 –1505 CE) enumerated 107 foreign words in the Quran.
- Professor Arthur Jeffery found about 275 words of Aramaic, Hebrew, Syriac, Ethiopic, Persian, and Greek origin.

According to Islamic scholar Andrew Rippin, both Orientalists and medieval Arabs recognized the presence of foreign words within the Quran. 12th-century Arab grammarian Abu Mansur Mauhub Al-Jawālīqī (1074 –1144 CE), spoke of "foreign words found in the speech of the ancient Arabs and employed in the Quran' without any cautious restrictions."

Defending against these charges, Ansar Al 'Adl of the Call to Monotheism website states that pure Arabic actually refers to the clarity and eloquence of the Arabic language in the Quran, and that the foreign words — "... had actually been naturalized and become regular Arabic words before they came to be used in the Qur'an".

==== Mystery letters ====
Another mystery is why about one-quarter of the Quran's surahs begin with a group of letters that do not form words. The Wikipedia article Muqattaʿat introduces the topic as follows:

The mysterious letters (muqaṭṭaʿāt, Arabic: حُرُوف مُقَطَّعَات ḥurūf muqaṭṭaʿāt, "disjoined letters" or "disconnected letters") are combinations of between one and five Arabic letters that appear at the beginning of 29 out of the 114 chapters (surahs) of the Quran just after the Bismillāh Islamic phrase. The letters are also known as fawātiḥ (فَوَاتِح) or "openers" as they form the opening verse of their respective surahs.

A table offering examples of some mysterious words is located Muqattaʿat § Inventory.

According to the Muslim translator and expositor Muhammad Asad:

"The significance of these letter-symbols has perplexed the commentators from the earliest times. There is no evidence of the Prophet's having ever referred to them in any of his recorded utterances, nor any of his Companions having ever asked him for an explanation. Yet, it established beyond any possibility of doubt that all the Companions - obviously following the example of the Prophet - regarded the muqatta'at as integral parts of the suras to which they are prefixed, and used to recite them accordingly: a fact which disposes effectively of the suggestion advanced by some Western orientalists that these letters may be no more than the initials of the scribes who wrote down the individual revelations at the Prophet's dictation, or of the Companions who recorded them at the time of the final codification of the Quran during the reign of the first three Caliphs."

"Some of the Companions as well as some of their immediate successors and later Qur'anic commentators were convinced that these letters are abbreviations of certain words or even phrases relating to God and His attributes, and tried to 'reconstruct' them with much ingenuity; but since the possible combinations are practically unlimited, all such interpretations are highly arbitrary and, therefore, devoid of any real usefulness ..."

Polymath Asad also quotes Abu Bakr (c. 573 – 634 CE) as saying: "In every divine writ (kitab) there is [an element of] mystery - and the mystery of the Qur'an is [indicated] in the openings of [some of] the suras".

==== Unsolved quranic problem ====
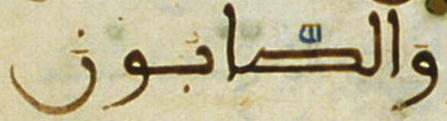
Maghrebi manuscript c. 1250–1350 "... and the Sabians"^{[Quran 5:69]}

The Quran mentions the "Jews, Christians, and Ṣābiʼūn" three times. (Note: as الصابئون al-Ṣābiʾūn, in later sources. الصابئة al-Ṣābiʾa)

1. 2:62 — Those who believe (in the Qur'an), and those who follow the Jewish (scriptures), and the Christians and the Sabians ...
2. 5:69 — Those who believe (in the Qur'an), those who follow the Jewish (scriptures), and the Sabians and the Christians ...
3. 22:17 — Surely those who believe and those who are Jews and the Sabeans (Note: The Sabeans should not be confused with the Sabaeans, the inhabitants of Sabaʾ, the biblical Sheba, a famous ancient nation in south Arabia) and the Christians and the Magians&...

Christians and Jews were identified by Muslims and non-Muslims in the 7th and 8th centuries, whereas the Ṣābiʼūn (usually Romanized as Sabians) were not.

The Sabians, who were people Ahl al-Kitāb (people of the book) but unknown, allegedly utilized a legal loophole within Islamic law to avoid forced conversion to Islam or death. (Note: According to Abu Yusuf Absha al-Qadi, Caliph al-Ma'mun of Baghdad in 830 CE stood with his army at the gates of Harran and questioned the Harranians about which protected religion they belonged to. As they were neither Muslim, Christian, Jewish, nor Magian, the caliph told them they were non-believers.He said they would have to become Muslims, or adherents of one of the other religions recognized by the Qur'an, by the time he returned from his campaign against the Byzantines or he would kill them. The Harranians consulted with a lawyer, who suggested they find their answer in the ^{[Quran 2:59]}, which states that Sabians were tolerated. It was unknown what the sacred text intended by "Sabian," and so they took the name.)

Their original identity, which seems to have been forgotten at an early date, has been called an "unsolved Quranic problem."

==== Narrative voice: Mohammed or God as speakers ====
Given that the Quran is believed to be God's divine message to humankind, some critics question why numerous verses feature humans addressing God, rather than God speaking directly to people. As scholars Richard Bell and W. Montgomery Watt note, powerful individuals sometimes refer to themselves in the third person. Yet, it is strange that the Prophet seems to be spoken to and informed about God as a third party. Also, that "God is made to swear by Himself." It is worth mentioning that in Arabic, there is no capitalization to indicate divinity.

Folklorist Alan Dundes notes how one phrase, e.g., "... acquit thou/you/them/him of us/your/their/his evil deeds", is repeated with a variety of voices: divine, human, singular, and plural. He cites other verses including:

- "We will acquit you of your evil deeds" 4:31
- "I will acquit you of your evil deeds" 5:12
- "He will acquit them of their evil deeds" 47:2
- "Allah will acquit him of his evil deeds" 64:9
- "Our Lord, forgive Thou our sins and acquit us of our evil deeds" 3:193

Other examples of this equivocation include:

- 33:371 starts by:
  - referring to God in the third person,
  - then is followed by a sentence with God speaking in first person ("we gave her in marriage ..."
  - before returning to third person ("and God's commandment must be performed").

In another verse, the perspective of God changes from:

- third person — "He" and "His" in "Exalted is He who took His Servant by night from al-Masjid al-Haram to al-Masjid al- Aqsa"
- to first person — "We" and "Our" in "We have blessed, to show him of Our signs"
- back again to third — "He" in "Indeed, He is the Hearing"

An entry in the Jewish Encyclopedia, notes: "For example, critics note that a sentence in which something is said concerning Allah is sometimes followed immediately by another in which Allah is the speaker, e.g. 16:8127:6131:943:10"

God as a third person

Sometimes the problem is resolved in translations of the Quran by the translators adding "Say!" in front of the verse.

- (Marmaduke Pickthall and N. J. Dawood for ^{[Quran 27:.1]}
- Abdullah Yusuf Ali for ^{[Quran 6:114]}.

In all, there are 350 verses in the Quran where God is addressed in the third person and are preceded by the imperative "say/recite!" (qul) — but it does not occur in Al-Fatiha and many other similar verses.

Reasons these oddities exist

Also, many peculiarities in the positions of words are due to the necessities of rhyme (lxix. 31, lxxiv. 3).

- 6:114 — starts out with Muhammad talking in first person (I) and switches to third (you).
- 6:114 — "Shall I seek other than Allah for judge, when He it is Who hath revealed unto you [this] Scripture, fully explained? Those unto whom We gave the Scripture [aforetime] know that it is revealed from thy Lord in truth. So be not thou [O Muhammad] of the waverers."

Some scholars, including Muhammad A. S. Abdel Haleem, have argued that "such grammatical shifts are a traditional aspect of Arabic rhetorical style". Ali Dashti notes that in many verses "the speaker cannot have been God." The opening surah Al-Fatiha, which contains such lines as: "Praise to God, the Lord of the Worlds, ... You [alone] we worship and from You [alone] we seek help ..." is "addressed to God, in the form of a prayer."

The following verses do not make sense coming from an all-powerful God:

- 27:91, proclaims, |"I have been commanded to serve the Lord of this city ..."
- 19:64, "We come not down save by commandment of thy Lord"

Were all surahs divinely inspired

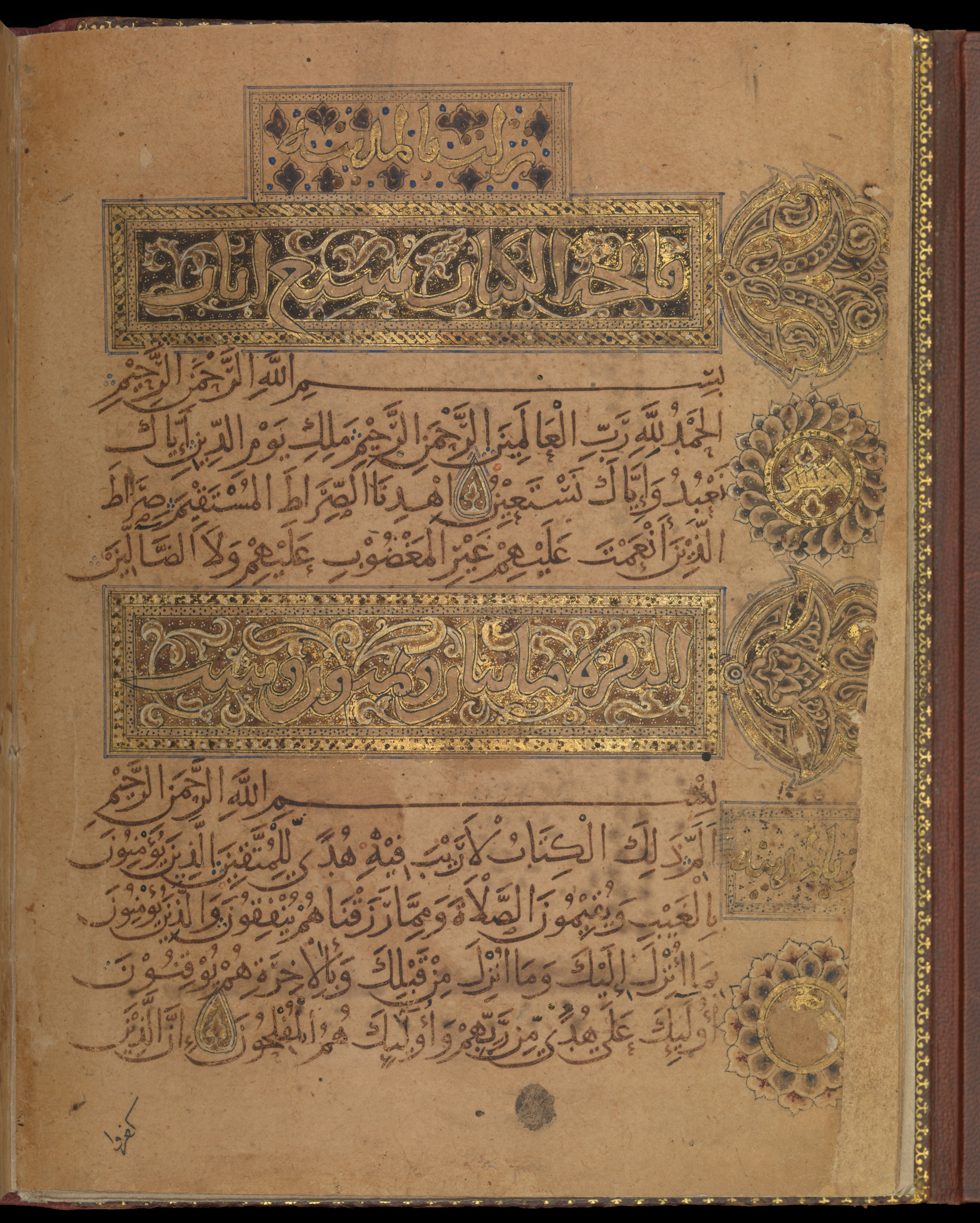
Headings for Al-Fatiḥa, and for Chapter 2, Al-Baqara. From the Quran of Ibn al-Bawwab. Baghdad, 1000/1001. Chester Beatty Library

Some early Muslims did indeed question if every Surah in the Quran was divinely inspired. Regarded as a trustworthy transmitter of Hadith, Ibn Masud (c. 594 – c. 653 CE) was a companion of Muhammad and recorded his divine revelations. He did not believe that the introductory chapter to the Quran, Surah Al-Fatiha, and two other chapters 113 and 114 were a genuine part of the Quran. All contained the phrase — "I take refuge in the Lord". Other companions of Muhammad also disagreed over which surahs were divinely inspired.

A verse of the Quran itself (15:87) seems to distinguish between Fatihah and the Quran:

- 15:87 — "And We have bestowed upon thee the Seven Oft-repeated (verses) [referring to the seven verses of Surah Fatihah] and the Grand Qur'an."

Al-Suyuti (1445 –1505 CE), the noted medieval philologist and commentator of the Quran, thought five verses had questionable attribution to God and were likely spoken by either Muhammad or Gabriel.

Another perspective

Criticism has been leveled at instances of swearing oaths by God, such as those in Surahs 75:1–2 and 90:1. Richard Bell suggested this was likely a traditional formula, and Montgomery Watt drew a parallel between these verses and Hebrews 6:13. It's widely accepted that the first-person plural pronoun in Surah 19:64 denotes angels, speaking of their earthly mission from God. According to Bell and Watt, the attribution to angels can help interpret verses where the speaker's identity is uncertain.

===== Spelling, syntax and grammar =====
Two articles critical of the Quran were released in 2020.

Hashem article

On January 10, 2020, the Saudi journalist Ahmad Hashem released a provocative article named "Amending the Quran" on various Saudi Opinions (Araa Al-Saudiah) platforms. According to Hashem, most Muslims hold that the text codified by the third caliph Uthman bin 'Affan r. 644 CE – 656 CE is — "sacred and must not be amended", i.e., in mainstream Islamic theology, the text of the Qur'an is considered divine, perfect, and unalterable.

His article ignited considerable discussion by claiming that:

- The Uthmanic script was compiled by a human committee after Muhammad's lifetime and is not sacred.
- The Quran has 2,500 mistakes related to spelling, grammar, and syntax attributed to early scribes.

He cited these examples of errors:

- 68:6, [the word] بِأَيِّيكُمُ ["which of you"] appears, instead of بأيكم. In other words, an extra ي was added.
- 25:4, [the word] جَآءُو ["they committed"] appears, instead of جَاءُوا or جاؤوا. In other words, the Aleph § Arabic ʾalif in the plural masculine suffix وا is missing.
- 28:9, the word امرأت ["wife"] appears, instead of امرأة.

Hence, the author argues that while the recitation of the Quran is divine, the Quranic script established by caliph Uthman is "a human invention" and called for amending historical scribal errors (a significant departure from traditional Islamic theology) while reexamining ancient texts to fit modern perceptions. He also called for updating the text to adhere to modern Arabic spelling standards. Critics and online commentators accused the outlets and writer of insolence, contempt, and attempting to compromise the integrity of Islam's holy book. Even suggesting that the quran or core Islamic texts should be "rewritten" or fundamentally altered by human analysts is widely considered blasphemous.

Gulizada article

Another piece critical of the Quran was released the same year. On July 20, 2020, Jarjis Gulizada released an article titled "A Call for Rewriting the Quran." The journalist used the adaptability of mosque social-distancing guidelines during COVID-19 to advocate for religious practices and texts to evolve with the times. He specifically requested that leaders in Saudi Arabia produce a Quran with modernized spelling, aiming to improve readability for non-Arab Muslim readers. His suggestion to change Islamic texts—in particular the Qur'an, which Muslims hold as God's unchanging, literal word—was met with fierce resistance from the Muslim community. The article was widely criticized, and Elaph removed it from its news portal.

===== Out-of-place or transposed phrases and passages =====
An example of a misplaced verse fragment is found in Quran 24:61 ^{(Translated by Yusuf Ali)}. The verse beginning starts with — "It is no fault in the blind nor in one born lame, nor in one afflicted with illness ..." The verse continues "nor in yourselves, that ye should eat in your own houses, or those of your fathers, or your mothers, or your brothers, or your sisters." In this context, the choice of words, blind, lame, and ill, appears to be out of place. (Note: Entire verse of 24:61 ^{(Translated by Yusuf Ali)} — It is no fault in the blind nor in one born lame, nor in one afflicted with illness, nor in yourselves, that ye should eat in your own houses, or those of your fathers, or your mothers, or your brothers, or your sisters, or your father's brothers or your father's sisters, or your mohter's brothers, or your mother's sisters, or in houses of which the keys are in your possession, or in the house of a sincere friend of yours: there is no blame on you, whether ye eat in company or separately. But if ye enter houses, salute each other - a greeting of blessing and purity as from Allah. Thus does Allah make clear the signs to you: that ye may understand.)

The same rephrased wording is found in section Quran 48:11–17 ^{(Translated by Yusuf Ali)}. An excerpt from that passage reads, — "No blame is there on the blind, nor is there blame on the lame, nor on one ill (if he joins not the war) .... in this context, the blind, lame, and ill now signify those who are absolved of blame if they avoid military Jihad campaigns.

Theodor Nöldeke (1836–1930) observes, "many sentences begin with a 'when' or 'on the day when' which seems to hover in the air, so that commentators are driven to supply a 'think of this' or some such ellipsis."

Michael Cook notes a "rough edge," with verse Quran 33:7 ^{(Translated by Pickthall)} which starts out with a "long and quite complicated subordinate clause" e.g. "And when you said to him ...", but we never learn what the clause is subordinate to.

==== Response to Quranic ambiguity ====
"The most frequent theological answer to inquiries regarding Quranic ambiguities is that the ambiguous verses Mutashabihat must be understood and interpreted in light of the clear, decisive verses Mobeen."

— British Fatwa Counci

This response is rooted in Surah 3 (Al Imran). Verse (Āyah) 7 of the Surah divides most Quranic text into two categories: "He it is Who has revealed the Book to you; some of its verses are decisive, they are the basis of the Book, and others are allegorical..."Quran 3:7 ^{(Translated by Shakir)}

Some Muslim scholars explain this ambiguity as the practice of Iltifāt (إلتفات). Iltifāt, or grammatical shift, refers to instances in the Quran where a sudden change in grammatical person (first, second, or third) occurs in pronouns that refer to the same individual or object. Unexpected shifts in the addressed person, verb tense, grammatical case, and noun usage, rather than use of pronouns, are also viewed by some scholars as iltifāt. In the Quran, iltifāt is used more extensively and in more diverse ways than in earlier Arabic poetry, and it's crucial to its unique style. The Quran generally features these elements intentionally for rhetorical impact or to vary pronoun usage. However, in context, the word can have two completely different meanings, depending on whether you use its classical or modern conversational definition.

Western scholar Neal Robinson provides a more detailed reasons as to why these are not "imperfections", but instead should be "prized": "changing the voice from they to we provides a shock effect, third person ('Him') makes God seem distant and transcendent, first person plural ('we') emphasizes His majesty and power, first person singular ('I') introduces a note of intimacy or immediacy, and so on.""

However, according to critics like Islamic Scholar Hassan Radwan, calling the Quran a miracle of God is a myth based on subjective facts that cannot be verified. On "Is the Qur'an a Miracle?" (see video). In his study, Radwan surveys common assertions proffering the Qur'an as a miracle of God. He categorizes these arguments into two main areas:

- Literary Eloquence: Radwan challenges the idea that the *Qur'an*'s beauty is inimitable. He argues that the claim of Muhammad's illiteracy is irrelevant in an oral culture and suggests that literary uniqueness does not equate to divinity. He identifies several lines he considers broken up or poorly constructed and notes that classical scholars similarly questioned the text's miraculous quality.
- Scientific Miracles: Radwan evaluates popular claims regarding modern scientific knowledge in the *Qur'an*, such as embryology, iron's celestial origin, and cosmic phenomena. He argues that such works are reinterpretations of ancient myths or of shared wisdom of the period and says that there are few real details in the Qur'an that would make it different from a human text composed in the 7th century.

Historical scholars also made these observations:

- Al-Ja'd ibn Dirham (uncertain – c. 742 CE), tutor to the Umayyad Caliph Marwan I, said "The Qur'an's eloquence is not a miracle, and people can do the like of it and better."
- Abu Musa, the Mu'tazilite scholar, said, "People are able to produce the like of the Qurʾān as regards eloquence, and composition and rhetorical beauty" as recorded by Persian scholar al-Shahrastani (1086 –1153 CE) in "The Book of Sects and Creeds."
- Ibn al-Rawandi (827 –920 CE), an early skeptic of Islam, said, "Indeed, the Qurʾān is not the speech of a wise god. In it are contradictions and mistakes and passages that are in the realms of the absurd."
- Abu Bakr al-Razi (c. 865 – c. 935 CE), a Persian polymath during the Islamic Golden Age, wrote, "By God, we are amazed that you say the Quran is a miracle when it is full of contradictions. It is a narration of ancient myths, it has no benefit, and it is not proof of anything."

A final perspective on the Quran's often ambiguous narrative voice was offered by Al-Zarkashi (1344 –1392 CE), "...moving from one style to another serves to make speech flow more smoothly", but also that by mixing up pronouns the Quran prevents the boredom that a more logical, straightforward narrative induces. It keeps the reader on their toes by helping "...the listener to focus, renew[ing] his interest, providing freshness and variety".

=== Pre-existing sources ===
==== Similarities with Jewish and Christian narratives ====
Non-Muslim historians researching the Quran's origins often focus on Christian and Jewish sources. The Quran mentions over fifty people and many events also found in the Christian Bible, highlighting shared stories across these sacred texts. (Note: The Quran contains reference to such biblical personages as Adam & Eve, Cain & Abel, Noah, Abraham, Joseph, Lot, Moses, Saul, David and Goliath, Jonah, Jesus, Mary.) Shared examples include:

- Moses is referenced in 36 surahs, 502 verses for a total of 135 citations.
- Abraham is mentioned in 245 verses.
- Noah appears in 131 verses.

==== Shared legends, parables and folklore ====
Folklore legends and parables also appear in the Quran with motifs similar to Jewish traditions including:

- Cain and Abel ^{[Quran 5:27–31 (Translated by Yusuf Ali)]} — Cain and Abel are not mentioned by their explicit names, but are referred to as the "two sons of Adam" and are assigned the names Qabil (Cain) and Habil (Abel) - see Cain and Abel in Islam
- Abraham ^{[Quran 21:57–60]} — (58)So he broke them to pieces, (all) but the biggest of them, that they might turn (and address themselves) to it. (60)They said, "We heard a youth talk of them: He is called Abraham." - see Abraham in Islam
- Solomon ^{[Quran 27:18–19]} — Solomon (Note: "Sulaiman is an English transliteration of the Arabic name سليمان 'peaceful' and corresponds to the Hebrew Jewish name (שְׁלֹמֹה) Shlomoh and the English Solomon (/ˈsɒləmən/). Solomon was the scriptural figure who was king of what was then the United Kingdom of Israel (c. 970–931 BCE) and is revered as a major prophet by Muslims." See Sulaiman) is marching with his army of jinn, humans, and birds. Approaching a valley, Solomon overhears a warning from a single ant - "...when they came to a (lowly) valley of ants, one of the ants said: "O ye ants, get into your habitations, lest Solomon and his hosts crush you (under foot) without knowing it." The passage indicates that Solomon overheard and comprehended the alert issued by the ant. According to Islamic tradition, God granted Solomon the miracle of understanding the languages of animals and insects - see Solomon in Islam § Solomon and the ant.
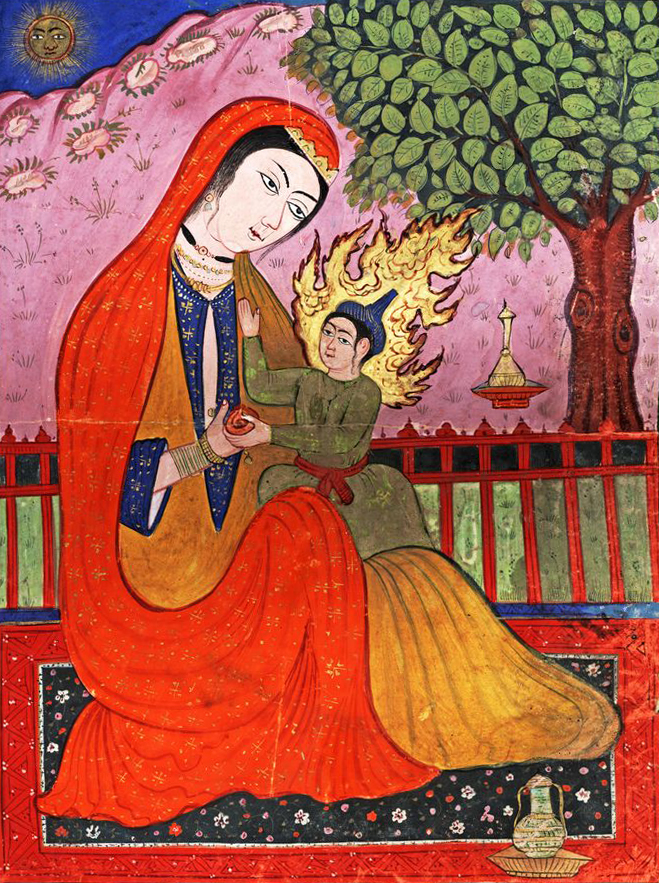
  Persian miniature of Mary and Jesus
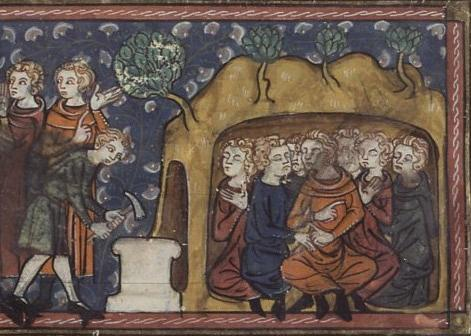
  Decius walling in the Seven sleepers
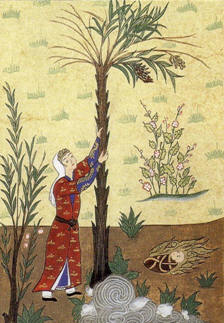
  Mary shaking the palm tree for dates
  Similar legends and parables appear in the Quran, exhibiting motifs akin to those found in Christian traditions, including the following:
- Seven Sleepers known in Christianity as the Seven Sleepers of Ephesus, and in Islam as companions of the cave al-Kahf (اصحاب الکهف, aṣḥāb al-kahf) Both parables describe a group of righteous youths who fled a tyrannical, pagan society to protect their faith. For more detail see – Seven Sleepers § Christian story and Seven Sleepers § Islamic story^{[Quran 18:9–26 (Translated by Yusuf Ali)]}
- Mary is cherished in Christianity as the wife of Joseph and the mother of Jesus. Because she gave birth to Jesus, she is revered as the Mother of God. In Islam, Mary (known in Arabic as Maryam bint Imran) is revered as the greatest and most virtuous woman to have ever lived. Her name appears 34 times in the Quran, more than in the New Testament. The 19th chapter of the Quran, Surah Maryam, is named entirely after her. The Quran explicitly states: Behold! the angels said: "O Mary! Allah hath chosen thee and purified thee and chosen thee above the women of all nations.^{[Quran 3:42 (Translated by Yusuf Ali)]} For more detail see – Mary, mother of Jesus § In Islam and Mary, mother of Jesus § Islamic.
- The Quran and the Gospel of Pseudo-Matthew both narrate the palm tree story about an event from Mary and Jesus' lives. The similarity between the two versions has been acknowledged by scholars. Each text sets the story in different contexts.
  - Pseudo-Matthew associates it with Jesus' early years, i.e., when Mary is weary and hungry, baby Jesus commands the palm tree's high branches filled with dates to " bend thy branches, and refresh my mother with thy fruit."
  - The Quran links it to Mary's labor, i.e., "And shake towards thyself the trunk of the palm-tree: It will let fall fresh ripe dates upon thee", as a lesson on blending human effort with divine reliance.^{[Quran 19:25 (Translated by Yusuf Ali)]}

For more detailed accounts see — Gospel of Pseudo-Matthew § Relation to the Quran and Mary in Islam § Islamic tradition

However, the Quran and the Bible do differ on several major narratives and theological issues. To name a few:

- The Quran does not embrace the Christian concept of original sin.
- The Quran denies that Jesus is the Son of God — "The Jews call 'Uzair a son of Allah, and the Christians call Christ the son of Allah. That is a saying from their mouth; (in this) they but imitate what the unbelievers of old used to say. Allah's curse be on them: how they are deluded away from the Truth!"^{[Quran 9:30 (Translated by Yusuf Ali)]}
- The Quran states that Jesus was not crucified, nor did he die or was he resurrected — 157"That they said (in boast), "We killed Christ Jesus the son of Mary, the Messenger of Allah";- but they killed him not, nor crucified him, but so it was made to appear to them, and those who differ therein are full of doubts, with no (certain) knowledge, but only conjecture to follow, for of a surety they killed him not" - 158"Nay, Allah raised him up unto Himself; and Allah is Exalted in Power, Wise"^{[Quran 4:157–158 (Translated by Yusuf Ali)]}

==== Disputing pre-existing sources ====
Non-Muslim historians—including secular, Jewish, and Christian scholars—have, in accordance with Occam's razor, sought simpler and non-divine explanations for this connection. Here are a few examples:

- Islamic tradition records numerous instances of Muhammad's interactions with Jewish and Christian figures throughout his life, such as his meeting with the Christian monk Bahira and his interactions with the Jewish tribes in Medina.
- In Islamic language, one can deal only with shahada, i.e., what can be perceived, described, and studied, while ignoring the unseen al-Ghaib, i.e., made known only by divine revelation.

Those wishing to further explore the relationship between the Quran and the Judeo-Christian scriptural tradition may read the works of the following scholars:

- Fred Donner
- Abraham Geiger,
- Tor Andræ
- Richard Bell
- Matt Slick

===== Jewish influence =====
"Syncretism is the combining or merging of various distinct beliefs or schools of thought, particularly religious ones. For instance, features and components of one religion are incorporated and absorbed into another."

— Syncretism

Scholars have attempted to demonstrate that the Quran was influenced by Jewish traditions.

Cain and Abel

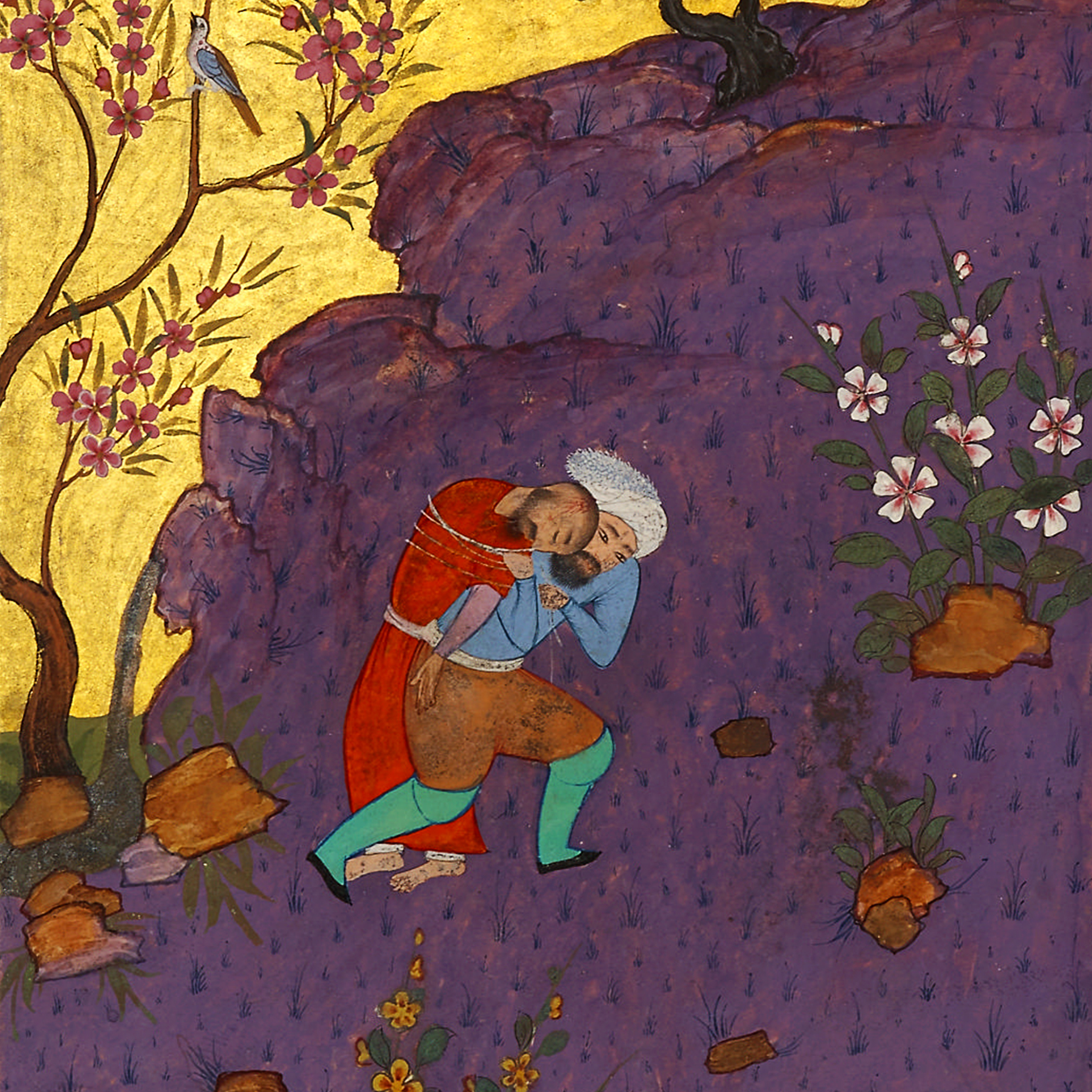
Islamic illustration of Cain carrying his murdered brother, Abel

Several Quranic narratives draw on Jewish Midrash Tanhuma legends, such as the account of Cain learning to bury Abel's body even though the account does not appear in the Christian Bible or canonical Christian scripture. The Midrash Tanhuma offers a rabbinic interpretation of the brief biblical story of Cain and Abel from Genesis 4. The Bible states: "Cain rose against Abel his brother and killed him," but does not explain how. When God asks Cain, "Where is Abel your brother?", Cain famously answers, "Am I my brother's keeper?"

Abel's body lay cast aside because Cain did not know how to dispose of his remains. God sends two birds; one kills the other and buries it, teaching Cain the importance of burial. Upon observing this, Cain grasped the idea of burying the dead and dug a grave for Abel. This particular legend from Tanhuma is frequently cited by scholars as a primary source for the Quranic narrative involving a raven. ^{[Quran 5:31 (Translated by Yusuf Ali)]} states:"Then Allah sent a raven, who scratched the ground, to show him how to hide the shame of his brother. "Woe is me!" said he; "Was I not even able to be as this raven, and to hide the shame of my brother?" then he became full of regrets."

Early attempts to establish the connection

- Christian writer Sozomen (400 –450 CE), suggested that certain Saracen tribes rediscovered their ancestral lineage as descendants of Ishmael, the firstborn son of the biblical patriarch Abraham and his Egyptian wife's handmaiden, after coming into contact with Jewish communities and adopting Jewish laws and customs. While there is no conclusive evidence linking these Arabs to Muhammad, the circumstances suggest that the Quranic content likely predates Muhammad.
- German rabbi and scholar Abraham Geiger (1810–1874) suggested that Jewish influence helped shape the Quran. In his award-winning essay, "What did Muhammad take from Judaism?" Geiger sought to demonstrate that significant sections of the Koran were derived from, or based on, Rabbinic literature
- American scholar C. C. Torrey (1863–1956) emphasized this idea even more strongly — "in the Koran itself there is no clear evidence that Mohammed had ever received instruction from a Christian teacher, while many facts testify emphatically to the contrary ... he gained his Christian material either from Jews in Mekka...".

Other scholarly research

- American theologian Norman Geisler, in "Answering Islam: The Crescent in Light of the Cross", co-authored with Abdul Saleeb, discusses the Qur'an in Chapter 9 ("An Evaluation of the Qur'an"). He argues that the Qur'an's reliance on Jewish folklore, Christian apocrypha, and heretical traditions indicates human authorship rather than divine revelation. Geisler supports this by citing specific textual references and contends that inaccuracies and legendary elements in the Qur'an imply that it is a human creation of the 7th century.
- American historian Michael Cook believes Muhammad "owed more to Judaism than to Christianity," and mentions a "fusion of Jewish-based monotheism with Arab identity" in Palestine prior to Islam.
- Ibn Warraq compares the similarities of Muhammad of Islam and Moses of the Jews. Both bearers of revelation (Pentateuch v. Quran), both receiving revelation on a mountain (Mount Sinai v. Mt. Hira), and both leading their people to escape persecution (Exodus vs. Hijra).
- Historian Bernard Lewis describes this as "something like what in Christian history was called a Judaizing heresy."
- According to Professor Moshe Sharon, specialist in Arabic epigraphy, the legends about Muhammad having ten Jewish teachers developed in the 10th century: "In most versions of the legends, ten Jewish wise men or dignitaries appear, who joined Muhammad and converted to Islam for different reasons. In reading all the Jewish texts one senses the danger of extinction of the Jewish people; and it was this ominous threat that induced these Sages to convert..."
- According to the Jewish Encyclopedia, "The dependence of Mohammed upon his Jewish teachers or upon what he heard of the Jewish Haggadah and Jewish practices is now generally conceded."

Answering the research

Early Islamic jurists and theologians acknowledged certain Jewish influences; however, they contended that recognizing these influences is often seen as a degradation or weakening of the original message.

===== Christian =====
"direct and polemical interaction suggests an active religious environment where outcompeting Christians was a concern."

— Gabriel Said Reynolds

External videos
- How Christianity and the Qur'an Speak to Each Other
- Gabriel Said Reynolds disussing his new book "Christianity and the Qur'an: The Rise of Islam in Christian Arabia.

Dr. Gabriel Said Reynolds, Professor of Islamic Studies, characterizes the doctrines of Christianity and the Qur'an as existing within a highly competitive arena, where common religious themes are employed but reinterpreted to support a strict monotheistic perspective. Contemporary historians recognize the Qur'an as deeply involved in the vigorous jesus-centric debates that dominated the Middle East during Late Antiquity.

Historical scholars have studied the Quran's links to Christianity, identifying themes and symbols from Christian thought used or referenced in the Quran.

- Scottish historian H.A.R. Gibb (1895–1971) states that many of the details in the description of Judgment Day, Heaven, and Hell, as well as vocabulary, "are closely paralleled in the writings of the Syriac Christian fathers and monks."
- Swedish bishop and scholar Tor Andræ (1885–1947), saw Christian "Nestorians of Yemen, monophysites of Ethiopia and especially ... Syrian pietism influencing Islam".
- American historian Richard Carrier regards the reliance on pre-Islamic Christian sources as evidence that Islam derived from a heretical sect of Christianity.
- Scholar Oddbjørn Leirvik states, "The Qur'an and Hadith have been clearly influenced by the non-canonical ('heretical') Christianity that prevailed in the Arab peninsula and further in Abyssinia" prior to Islam."
- British author Tom Holland observes that the Quran links certain doctrines with Christianity.
  - Jesus did not die on the cross — referenced in the Gospel of Basilides.
  - Jesus was a mortal man, not divine, — a belief held by the Ebionites.
  - The mother of Jesus is considered divine — a view held by certain minority Christian sects, and by groups that did not hold any significant prominence by the 7th century, the same period during which the Quran was revealed.

===== Response to simuliarities =====
Dr. Mustafa Khattab writes, "the Quran being plagiarized from the Bible is not likely, as the first Arabic translation of the Bible occurred centuries after the death of Muhammad. He also writes that the narratives are similar in that they both stem from divine revelation."

=== Influence of heretical Christian sects ===
==== Death of Jesus ====
"The standard Islamic position, based on a reading of Surah 4:157, is that Jesus was not crucified, nor was he killed. Instead, another person—often identified as Judas Iscariot or Simon of Cyrene—was made to look like Jesus and was crucified in his place, while Jesus was raised alive into heaven."

— Gabriel Said Reynolds

The standard Islamic narrative concerning the end of Jesus's earthly life is anchored in Surah An-Nisa^{[Quran 4:157 (Translated by Yusuf Ali)]}.

"That they said (in boast), 'We killed Christ Jesus the son of Mary, the Messenger of Allah' - but they killed him not, nor crucified him, but so it was made to appear to them, and those who differ therein are full of doubts, with no (certain) knowledge, but only conjecture to follow, for of a surety they killed him not"

Scholars in Islamic studies, theology, and history emphasize that the text explicitly states that Jesus was neither killed nor crucified by his enemies; rather, it only seemed that way. The view that Jesus only appeared to be crucified and did not genuinely die predates Islam and appears in various apocryphal gospels.

- In his manuscript Against Heresies, Greek bishop Irenaeus (c. 155 – c. 191 CE) describes Gnostic beliefs that closely resemble the Islamic view. Section 4 of the book reads:

"Wherefore, he did not himself suffer death, but Simon, a certain man of Cyrene, being compelled, bore the cross in his stead; so that this latter being transfigured by him, that he might be thought to be Jesus, was crucified, through ignorance and error, while Jesus himself received the form of Simon, and, standing by, laughed at them. For since he was an incorporeal power, and the Nous (mind) of the unborn father, he transfigured himself as he pleased, and thus ascended to him who had sent him ..."

— Against Heresies, Book I, Chapter 24, Section 4

- The author of the Gospel of Mark likely knew Alexander and Rufus, who are cast as children of an eyewitness who supported their father Simon of Cyrene's testimony that he was compelled to help carry the cross on which Jesus Christ was crucified.
- A 4th century Gnostic manuscript found in the Nag Hammadi library — the Second Treatise of the Great Seth has a similar view of Jesus' death: "I was not afflicted at all, yet I did not die in solid reality but in what appears, in order that I not be put to shame by them." Another section of the manuscript reads: "Another, their father, was the one who drank the gall and the vinegar; it was not I. Another was the one who lifted up the cross on his shoulder, who was Simon. Another was the one on whom they put the crown of thorns. But I was rejoicing in the height over all the riches of the archons and the offspring of their error and their conceit, and I was laughing at their ignorance"
- The Gnostic Apocalypse of Peter is the third tractate (Treatise) in Codex VII of the Nag Hammadi library. The codex reveals the same views of Jesus' death: "I saw him (Jesus) seemingly being seized by them. And I said, 'What do I see, O Lord? That it is you yourself whom they take, and that you are grasping me? Or who is this one, glad and laughing on the tree? And is it another one whose feet and hands they are striking?' The Savior said to me, 'He whom you saw on the tree, glad and laughing, this is the living Jesus. But this one into whose hands and feet they drive the nails, is his fleshly part, the substitute being put to shame, the one who came into being in his likeness."
- Islamic scholar Dr. Joel Kraemer, in his 1992 book - Israel Oriental Studies XII, states, "The general Islamic view supporting the denial of crucifixion may have been influenced by Manichaeism (Docetism), which holds that someone else was crucified instead of Jesus, while concluding that Jesus will return during the end times." (Note: That Manicheism went further on to the Arabian peninsula, up to the Hejaz and Mecca, where it could have possibly contributed to the formation of the doctrine of Islam, cannot be proven. A detailed description of Manichean traces in the Arabian-speaking regions is given by Tardieu (1994).)

However, the general consensus is that Manichaeism was not prevalent in Mecca during the 6th and 7th centuries when Islam developed.

From a Christian perspective, there is scholarly consensus affirming the historicity of the Crucifixion of Jesus. Dr. Paul Rhodes Eddy, a Professor of Biblical and Theological Studies, states: "if there is any fact of Jesus' life that has been established by a broad consensus, it is the fact of Jesus' crucifixion."

==== Mother Mary and related Islamic perspectives ====
"Let Mary be held in honor. Let the Father, Son, and Holy Ghost be adored, but let no one adore Mary."

— St. Epiphanius of Salamis c. 374–377 CE

Introduction to the Collyridians

The Collyridians were an early Christian heretical group whose members were women and had existed in pre-Islamic Arabia. Their name derives from the Greek word "collyris" (κολλυρίς), meaning "baked bread cakes," which were offerings to their ancient earth goddess. Early Church Father Epiphanius, who lived (c. 310 – c. 403 CE), claimed that they now offered these cakes to Mary, whom they worshipped as a goddess. As a critic of this heresy, Epiphanius insisted that worship should be directed to the Trinity, not Mary. The quotation illustrates a central difference between how Christianity conceives of Mary and the Islamic point of view.

The Collyridians were outside of dominant Christianity; in fact, some even doubted their very existence.

Mary, mother of god

Christians recognized Mary in the Christian faith as a first-century Jewish woman from Nazareth and the mother of Jesus in Christianity. She conceived Jesus by the Holy Spirit while a virgin, according to the Gospels of Matthew, Mark, and Luke. By all four Gospels, she is both Joseph's wife and Jesus' mother. Mary has been revered as the most revered saint from the very beginning of Christianity, known as the Virgin or Queen among various titles.

Islam holds Mary in high esteem. The Quran mentions her 70 times and calls her the greatest woman who has ever lived. She is the only woman named in the Quran. Her story is recounted in three Meccan surahs (19, 21, 23) and four Medinan surahs (3, 4, 5, 66). The nineteenth Surah, Maryam, bears her name.

The Quran tells how God spoke to Mary through the archangel Gabriel. God said to Mary that she was still a virgin and that under the influence of a divine angel she had miraculously conceived a child. God decided to name her child Jesus — who would be Christ, the Promised Messiah of Islam. Mary is believed to have been chosen by God, above all "the women of the world."

So, in short, Mary is revered as the centerpiece of Christianity and Islam, as a holy figure in both. Christians think she miraculously conceived Jesus through the Holy Spirit, but remained a virgin, and she is considered the holiest saint. In Islam, she is revered as the greatest woman of all time, is the only woman named in the Quran, and similarly experienced her virgin birth proclaimed by the archangel Gabriel.

Different perspectives on the Trinity

Christian doctrine explains the nature of God, defining one God as existing in three divine persons—namely, God the Father, God the Son (Jesus Christ), and God the Holy Spirit, i.e., three distinct persons.

Islamic belief universally denies the Christian Trinity. From ancient times onward, Muslims have rejected Christian doctrines of the Trinity. Islam sees any "plurality" within God as a denial of Tawhid or monotheism. Tawhid itself, the fundamental and central term in Islam, is the basic pillar of a Muslim's entire existence. Shirk, the act of ascribing partners to God, is considered to be a form of unbelief in Islam and the gravest sin of blasphemy. So if believers state that "Allah is the Messiah, son of Mary" or "Allah is one in a Trinity", they are committing blasphemy.

The Quran reinforces this claim, noting 3 verses from the sura Al-Ma'ida

- Quran 5:72-73, Those who say, “Allah is the Messiah, son of Mary,” have certainly fallen into disbelief ...Those who say, “Allah is one in a Trinity,” have certainly fallen into disbelief ...(Denial of the divinity of Jesus and Mary)
- Quran 5:75, The Messiah, son of Mary, was no more than a messenger ...(Jesus as a human prophet, not divine)
- Quran 5:116, And ˹on Judgment Day˺ Allah will say, “O Jesus, son of Mary! Did you ever ask the people to worship you and your mother as gods besides Allah?” He will answer, “Glory be to You! How could I ever say what I had no right to say? If I had said such a thing, you would have certainly known it ...". (Dialogue about deifying Mary, which Islam rejects)

Some scholars have suggested that sura Al-Ma'ida implies Muhammad considered Mary to be part of the Trinity. That idea has never been incorporated into mainstream Christian doctrine and is not clear and unequivocal among any ancient Christian communities.

Finally, The Quran: An Encyclopedia states that "the Quran's objection to Christian practice centers on Christianity's shirk—its worship of Jesus, Mary, and the saints 'in derogation of Allah.' It holds that there is no basis for belief in the Trinity, as Jesus himself would never have endorsed such a doctrine."

=== Scholarly and theological debate on abrogation ===
"Nothing of our revelation (even a single verse) do we abrogate or cause be forgotten, but we bring (in place) one better or the like thereof. Knowest thou not that Allah is Able to do all things?"

— ^{[Quran 2:106 (Translated by Pickthall)]}

Abrogation in Islamic theology is the principle by which a subsequent divine revelation is said to amend, replace, or void the prior legal ruling. Naskh (نسخ) is a foundational doctrine in Islamic law (sharia). In tafsir, or Islamic legal interpretation, naskh recognizes that a rule may not always be suitable for every situation. In the standard naskh, one ruling is abrogated to insert an exception to the general rule, and the text upon which the ruling is based is not repealed.

The concept of abrogation, Naskh (نسخ) in the Quran, is a significant point of criticism, interpreted as evidence of internal contradiction and a lack of divine perfection. Islamic scholars say it helped law adapt to a rapidly growing Muslim community during the lifetime of the Prophet Muhammad. It also applies only to legal rulings, commands, and prohibitions, never to fundamental beliefs, theology, or historical narratives.

Examples of naskh

- ^{[Quran 8:65 (Translated by Yusuf Ali)]} tells Muslim warriors, — "O Prophet! rouse the Believers to the fight. If there are twenty amongst you, patient and persevering, they will vanquish two hundred: if a hundred, they will vanquish a thousand ..."

This verse is thought to be abrogated by the verse that follows ^{[Quran 8:66 (Translated by Yusuf Ali)]}, which lowers the number of enemies each Muslim warrior is expected to overcome in battle. — "... He knoweth that there is a weak spot in you: But (even so), if there are a hundred of you, patient and persevering, they will vanquish two hundred, and if a thousand, they will vanquish two thousand ..."

- In Islam, stoning (Arabic: رجم) is the Hudud, or punishment where an organized group throws stones at an individual until that person dies. Under some versions of Islamic law (Sharia), it is the prescribed punishment in cases of Zina committed by a married person, which requires either a confession from either the adulterer or adulteress, or producing four witnesses of sexual penetration. Yet, the verse used for justification was nowhere to be found in the Quran.

However, the Quran, ^{[Quran 24:2 (Translated by Yusuf Ali)]}, clearly states the punishment for zina is, — "The woman and the man guilty of adultery or fornication, flog each of them with a hundred stripes..."

Some Islamists believe that there was a verse about stoning, but it was omitted or removed from the Quran and is now classified as part of a broader category of Ayat Nasikha (آيات ناسخة), which refers to abrogated verses in the Quran. The punishment has been rarely applied in the history of Islam owing to the very strict evidentiary requirements stipulated by Islamic law. The back- and- forth-agruments are beyond the scope of this article — see Stoning in Islam § Scriptural basis, Stoning in Islam § In jurisprudence and Zina § Islamic scriptures.

Critics' challenges to abrogation

The question of why a perfect and unchangeable divine revelation would need to be abrogated, however, has led some scholars to question the practice.

- Philip Schaff has suggested that among the criticisms made of the concept of abrogation is that it was developed to remove contradictions found in the Quran, which "abounds in repetitions and contradictions, which are not removed by the convenient theory of abrogation" that it "poses a difficult theological problem" because it seems to suggest God was changing his mind.
- Prominent Islamic studies scholars David S. Powers and John Burton observed — "Abrogation poses a difficult theological problem' because it seems to suggest God was changing His mind, or has realized something He was unaware of when revealing the original verse, which is logically absurd for an eternally all-knowing deity.
- Ali Dashti postulated that it is suspiciously similar to the human process of "revising ... past decisions or plans" after "learning from experience and recognizing mistakes."

One scholar's response to critics

Islamic scholars such as Muhammad Husayn Tabatabaei (1903–1981) argue that abrogation in Quranic verses does not indicate contradiction but rather signifies supplementation and addition. A Quranic verse illustrating a temporary command, as it includes, is ^{[Quran 2:109 (Translated by Yusuf Ali)]} — "Quite a number of the People of the Book wish they could Turn you (people) back to infidelity after ye have believed, from selfish envy, after the Truth hath become Manifest unto them: But forgive and overlook, Till Allah accomplish His purpose; for Allah Hath power over all things. Tabatabaei's statement that forgiveness is temporary and there will then be another verse (another command) on this issue concludes the issue.^{[Quran 4:15 (Translated by Yusuf Ali)]}

=== Satanic verses ===
"This story is completely false and fabricated. It is impossible for the Prophet—upon whom be peace—to have uttered words of disbelief, whether intentionally, out of forgetfulness, or due to Satanic whisperings. To accept such a story is to undermine the absolute trustworthiness of the entire divine revelation."

— Fakhr al-Din al-Razi(c. 1149 – 1209 CE)

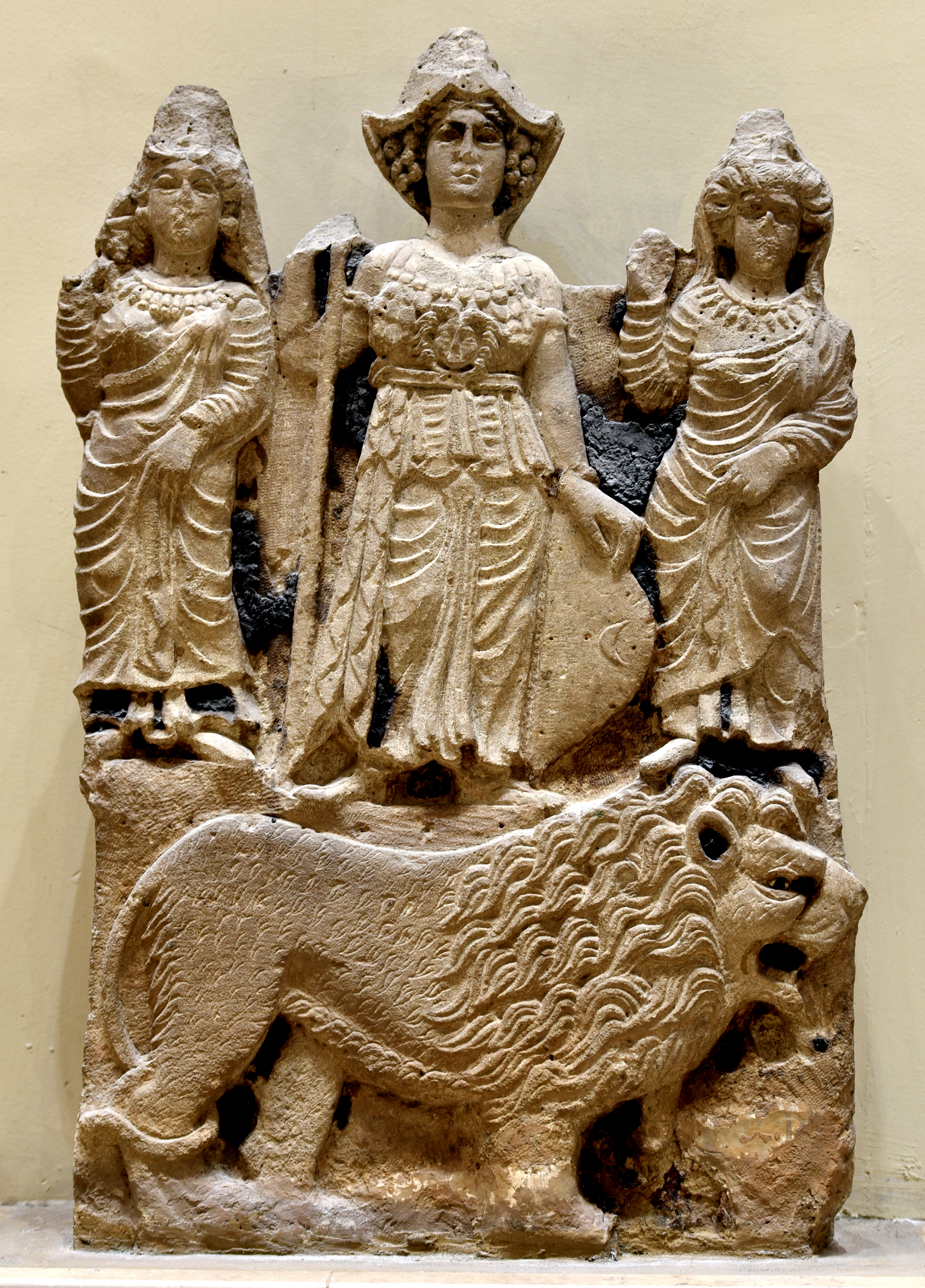
The Arabian goddess al-Lat, flanked by goddesses Manāt and al-'Uzzá

Early Muslims debated the story of the "Satanic Verses." This refers to a controversial early-Islamic event regarding revealed verses. Muhammad allegedly felt divinely inspired to add a phrase after reading two Quranic verses. He later discovered that Satan whispered the extra words into his ear. These other words eventually came to be referred to as the "Satanic Verses."

Orthodox Islam: The Qur'an is the definitive word of Allah. Revealed to Muhammad over a span of twenty-three years by the Angel Gabriel, Muslims say the Quran in its original Arabic form is unchanged, unblemished. As a result, they contend, its verses (ayahs) and chapters (suras) are transmitted through proper oral traditions from trustworthy accounts. The Quran's infallibility means the "Satanic Verses" conflict with its divine nature. And not only does this pose a threat to the idea of one God, but it also leads to the undermining of the belief in Allah.

Background

The Islamic founder Muhammad (c. 570 – c. 632 CE) was a military and political leader. In 629 CE, Muhammad, and his companions started a military campaign called the Conquest of Mecca (Arabic: فتح مكة). Its objective was to end the Muslim–Quraysh War. The fall of Mecca to Muhammad marked the end of the conflict. At the time, Mecca was a hotbed of paganism.

Most Meccans converted to Islam, not through force, but after seeing their old gods defeated and Muhammad's power grow.

The incident

The story begins with Muhammad reciting the surah An-Najm (Arabic: النجم, an-najm; meaning: The Star), the 53rd chapter of the Quran, as revealed to him by the angel Gabriel. (Note: An-Najm centers on validating the divine origin of Prophet Muhammad's message. Part of its message is to condemn polytheism and stop the worship of pagan goddesses.) Muhammad, while preaching Islam reads verses ^{[Quran 53:19 (Translated by Yusuf Ali)]} "Have ye seen Lat. and 'Uzza," "And another, the third (goddess), Manat?" ^{[Quran 53:20 (Translated by Yusuf Ali)]}.

According to early prophetic biographies of Muhammad by al-Waqidi (747 –823 CE), Ibn Sa'd (c. 784 – 845 CE) and the tafsir of al-Tabari (839 –923 CE), Satan allegedly deceived Muhammad into uttering the following lines (which do not appear in the Quran), —

"Have you thought of Al-lāt and al-'Uzzā and Manāt, the third, the other;

So it seems, Muhammad had been manipulated by Satan into acknowledging and praising the three chief pagan Meccan goddesses. These praises for the pagan deities are known as the "Satanic Verses."

Backlash

Religious authorities recorded the story for the first two centuries of the Islamic era. The story generated considerable debate within the Muslim community. If this episode were accepted, it would fundamentally question the Quran's divine origin and its infallibility. The actual episode was hotly disputed and was rejected by many for being apocryphal. 8th-century Muslim historian Ibn Ishaq claims these "Satanic Verses" were recanted shortly afterward by Muhammad at the behest of Gabriel.

The debate

Discussion on the "Satanic Verses" incident (Gharaniq) fall into two groups:

- Classical and modern Islamic theologians who reject the story –

Most classical Muslim scholars dispute the story's historical accuracy and reject the "Satanic Verses" altogether. They believe the event is a complete fabrication. They believe the Prophet transmitted God's message without error. They affirm that the Quran has been divinely preserved and believe Satan could not have meddled with its revelation. Classical theologians, hadith critics, and legal scholars have dismantled it using the sciences of narration chains isnad and the doctrine of prophetic infallibility ismah.

The prominent classical Muslim scholars who explicitly declared the Satanic Verses to be false include:

- Ibn Khuzaymah (838 –924 CE) – An early, authoritative hadith master authored a treatise opposing the narrative. He declared, "This story is a fabrication of the heretics Zandaqa."
- Ibn Hazm (Arabic: ابن حز (994 –1064 CE) the Andalusi Muslim polymath, dismissed the story out of hand. He categorized the story as a dangerous myth that was weaponized by early theological opponents of Islam to sow doubt, saying, "The hadith which includes the phrase, 'Indeed, they are the lofty Gharaniq, and their intercession is hoped for,' is an absolute lie. It is neither valid in terms of transmission nor worthy of being engaged with, as fabricating lies is within anyone's capacity."
- Fakhr al-Din al-Razi (c. 1149 – 1209 CE) a 12th-century Sunni Muslim theologian during the Islamic Golden Age, wrote, — "This story is completely false and fabricated. It is impossible for the Prophet—upon whom be peace—to have uttered words of disbelief, whether intentionally, out of forgetfulness, or due to Satanic whisperings. To accept such a story is to undermine the absolute trustworthiness of the entire divine revelation."
- Western historians debate its historical plausibility –

Some critics point to the incident of the Satanic Verses as a sign that the Quran may have human origins, possibly linked to Muhammad.

- Maxime Rodinson writes that the story of the Satanic Verses is unlikely to be false because it was "one incident, in fact, which may be reasonably accepted as true because the makers of Muslim tradition would not have invented a story with such damaging implications for the revelation as a whole".
- William Montgomery Watt accepts the incident truthfulness with this caveat: "Thus it was not for any worldly motive that Muhammad eventually turned down the offer of the Meccans, but for a genuinely religious reason; not for example, because he could not trust these men nor because any personal ambition would remain unsatisfied, but because acknowledgment of the goddesses would lead to the failure of the cause, of the mission he had been given by God."
- William Montgomery Watt and Alfred Guillaume argued for its authenticity on the grounds of the implausibility of Muslims fabricating a story so unflattering to their prophet. Watt says that "the story is so strange that it must be true in essentials."
- John Burton-Page (1921–2005), rejected the tradition. Burton's view is that these accounts helped maintain the status quo, toning down the Quran's radicalism. Rulers created laws contradicting the Quran using these narratives. Their justification was that some Quranic verses aren't binding. Burton agrees with Italian scholar, Leone Caetani (1869–1935), who wrote that the story of the "satanic verses" should be rejected not only on the basis of isnad, but because "had these hadiths even a degree of historical basis, Muhammad's reported conduct on this occasion would have given the lie to the whole of his previous prophetic activity."

Satanic Verses - the book

Salman Rushdie's book "The Satanic Verses" explores the good-versus-evil dichotomy using magical realism. The story follows two Indian Muslim men after a London plane bombing. One man transforms into the Archangel Gabriel, and the other becomes Satan. A subplot involves the devil tricking a prophet into believing pagan goddesses are divine. The novel's satire and magical realism offended many Muslims, sparking protests and a death fatwa against the author.

Final

Muhammad eventually took back his words. He cited ^{[Quran 53:21–23]} which belittled the goddesses. Islamic tradition holds that Gabriel chastised Muhammad for adulterating the revelation, at which point ^{[Quran 22:52 (Translated by Yusuf Ali)]} is revealed to comfort him, "Never did We send a messenger or a prophet before thee, but, when he framed a desire, Satan threw some (vanity) into his desire: but Allah will cancel anything (vain) that Satan throws in, and Allah will confirm (and establish) His Signs: for Allah is full of Knowledge and Wisdom:"

The Satanic Verses influenced modern Islamic thought and cultural debates, offering lessons on Islamic authority, authenticity, and interpretation.

=== Quran's audience and Muhammad's wives ===
"If you are in doubt about the Divine authorship of what We have been sending down on Our servant ( Muhammad), then produce just a surah like it and call for help from all your supporters, all those (to whom you apply for help apart from God), if you are truthful in your doubt and claim."

— ^{[Quran 2:23]}

Scholars note that various Quranic passages are directed at different groups, with the Quran emphasizing these specific audiences.

- All Humanity "Ya ayyuhan-nas" (يا أيها الناس), i.e., verses open with "O mankind."
- People of Intellect "Ulul Albab" (أُولُو الْأَلْبَابِ), i.e., "those who reflect" or "people of understanding"
- Believers Al-Muʼminun ( المؤمنون), i.e., beginning with "O you who have believed"
- The Prophet Muhammad (: مُحَمَّد), i.e., God speaking directly to Muhammad (mentioned by name only 4 times)
- Other groups include: The "People of the Book" Ahl al-Kitab, Polytheists of Mecca, and Hypocrites Al-Munafiqun.

Adherents believe God's guidance extends beyond the Quran. Believers found Muhammad's words as binding as the Quran. Prophetic guidance often clarified or expanded on Quranic verses. Despite audience differences, scholars maintain the Quran's divine origin.

Muhammad's wives

The question of whether the Quran's passages about Muhammad's wives provide evidence for or against divine authorship is a subject of much scholarly debate.

The historian Al-Tabari calculated that Muhammad married a total of fifteen women, though only ever eleven at one time

The Prophet Muhammad's wives are not mentioned by name even once in the Quran. They are collectively referred to by titles or plural forms like "your wives" (azwājika) or "women of the Prophet" (nisā' al-Nabiy) in about 10 to 12 passages.

- ^{[Quran 33:28 (Translated by Shakir)]}"O Prophet! say to your wives: If you desire this world's life and its adornment ... "
- ^{[Quran 33:50 (Translated by Shakir)]}"O Prophet! surely We have made lawful to you your wives whom you have given their dowries ..."
- ^{[Quran 58:1 (Translated by Shakir)]}"Allah indeed knows the plea of her who pleads with you about her husband ..."
- ^{[Quran 66:3 (Translated by Shakir)]}"And when the prophet secretly communicated a piece of information to one of his wives ..."

Why are Muhammad's wives mentioned in the Quran? It is argued that God gives Muhammad's wives "specific divine guidance, occasioned by their proximity to the Prophet (Muhammad)" where "Numerous divine reprimands addressed to Muhammad's wives in the Quran establish their special responsibility to overcome their human frailties and ensure their individual worthiness."

Interpreting these verses, and thus their impact on the Quran's divine message, is subjective. Critics see them as 7th-century Arabian historical evidence of human authorship, while followers see this as divine teaching, using the Prophet's life for guidance. Another argument is that the Quran must be interpreted on multiple levels, i.e., the text contains layers of meaning beyond the literal, obvious words on the page. Believers of the Quran's divine guidance say it describes humanity's physical and spiritual aspects and offers principles to solve all socio-economic, juridical, political, and administrative problems.

See – Quran § Interpretation

== Jurisprudence ==
"O ye who believe! When ye deal with each other, in transactions involving future obligations in a fixed period of time, reduce them to writing Let a scribe write down faithfully as between the parties: let not the scribe refuse to write: as Allah Has taught him ..."

— ^{[Quran 2:282 (Translated by Yusuf Ali)]}

This verse is a primary source of Islamic jurisprudence, i.e., Fiqh. Also, the passage is known as the "Verse of Loan" (Ayat ad-Dayn) and is the basis for Islamic commercial and financial law. Some disagreement exists regarding the Quran's role in understanding jurisprudence.

British-German professor of Arabic and Islam Joseph Schacht, in his work The Origins of Muhammadan Jurisprudence (1950), regarding the subject of law derived from the Quran, wrote:

"Muhammadan Islamic law did not derive directly from the Quran but developed ... out of popular and administrative practice under the Umaiyads, and this practice often diverged from the intentions and even the explicit wording of the Quran ... Norms derived from the Quran were introduced into Muhammadan law almost invariably at a secondary stage."

Schacht further states that every legal tradition from Muhammad must be taken as an inauthentic and fictitious expression of a legal doctrine formulated at a later date: — "... We shall not meet any legal tradition from the Prophet which can positively be considered authentic.

What is evident regarding the compilation of the Quran is the disagreement between the companions of Muhammad (earliest supporters of Muhammad), as evidenced by their several disagreements regarding interpretation and particular versions of the Quran and their interpretative Hadith and Sunna, namely the mutawatir mushaf having come into present form after Muhammad's death. John Burton's work The Collection of the Quran further explores how certain Quranic texts were altered to adjust interpretation, in regard to controversy between fiqh (human understanding of Sharia) and madhahib ( refers to any school of thought within Islamic jurisprudence).

== Scientific and historical accuracy ==
"The Holy Quran enjoins us to reflect on the verities of Allah's created laws of nature; however, that our generation has been privileged to glimpse a part of His design is a bounty and a grace for which I render thanks with a humble heart."

— Abdus Salam

Islam sees science and religion as complementary paths to one truth. Islamic theology views studying the natural world as a religious duty and worship, not separate from sacred knowledge. Early scholars argued for the possibility of multiple scientific explanations of the natural phenomena, and refused to subordinate the Quran to a changing science.

Persian polymath al-Biruni (973 – c. 1050 CE), regarded the Quran as a separate and autonomous realm of its own and held that the Quran – "does not interfere in the business of science nor does it infringe on the realm of science."

=== Dhu'l-Qarnayn ===
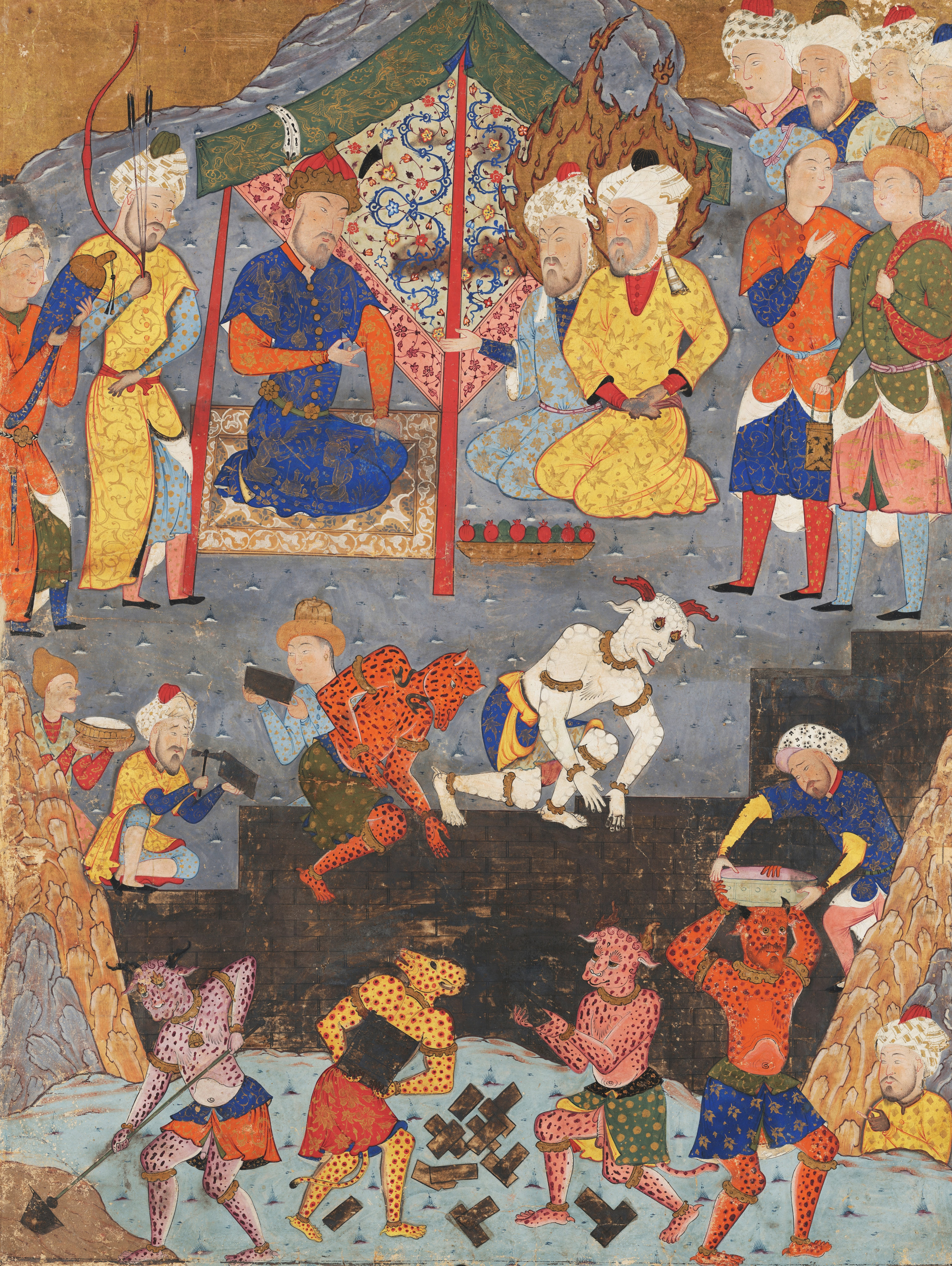
Dhu al-Qarnayn building a wall with the help of the jinns to keep away Gog and Magog.

The story of Dhul-Qarnayn appears in 19 verses of the Qur'an, specifically verses ^{[Quran 18:83–101 (Translated by Yusuf Ali)]}. According to the Quran, the prophet-king Dhu'l-Qarnayn traveled to the East and then on to the West. Then he constructed a wall to prevent incursions by Gog and Magog.

Most historians agree that the story of Dhu al-Qarnayn comes from legends of Alexander the Great in the Middle East, where it was called the Syriac Alexander Legend.

Muslim commentators have used theological arguments to reject the Alexander identification: Dhu al-Qarnayn lived for upwards of 700 years as an indication of God's favor, though this was not included in the Quran, and Dhu al-Qarnayn adhered to one God while Alexander was polytheistic. Cyrus the Great being Dhul-Qarnayn is also supported by other thinkers who bring up these points.

The legend is further developed through centuries, finally appearing in the Quran via a Syrian account. Dating problems and missing elements cast doubt on the possible relationship between the Quran and the Syriac Legend. Yet some also have responded to these arguments.

The difference between the literalistic and allegorical versions of Dhu'l-Qarnayn is mainly one of whether he was a real historical ruler who constructed an iron wall — or a symbolic type meant to communicate truths on the cosmic, psychological or spiritual planes. The following is a condensed table comparing real and allegorical accounts of the story. There are myriad interpretations of each story element in allegorical form. Some of the more popular options are listed in the table.

Story Element	Literalist Interpretation Tafsir	Allegorical Interpretation Ta'wil
Dhu'l-Qarnayn	A real ancient king	The perfected human soul or ideal leader.
The Two Horns	A physical crown, helmet, or two land masses	Mastery over inner/outer worlds or dual eras.
The Traveller	Military campaigns to physical geographic borders	The soul's journey through darkness to enlightenment
Gog & Magog	Real, hidden tribes trapped behind a barrier	Internal chaos, ego passions, and spiritual corruption
The Wall	A physical structure made of iron and molten copper^{[Quran 18:95–96]}	Spiritual discipline, intellect, and divine protection

=== Josephus ===
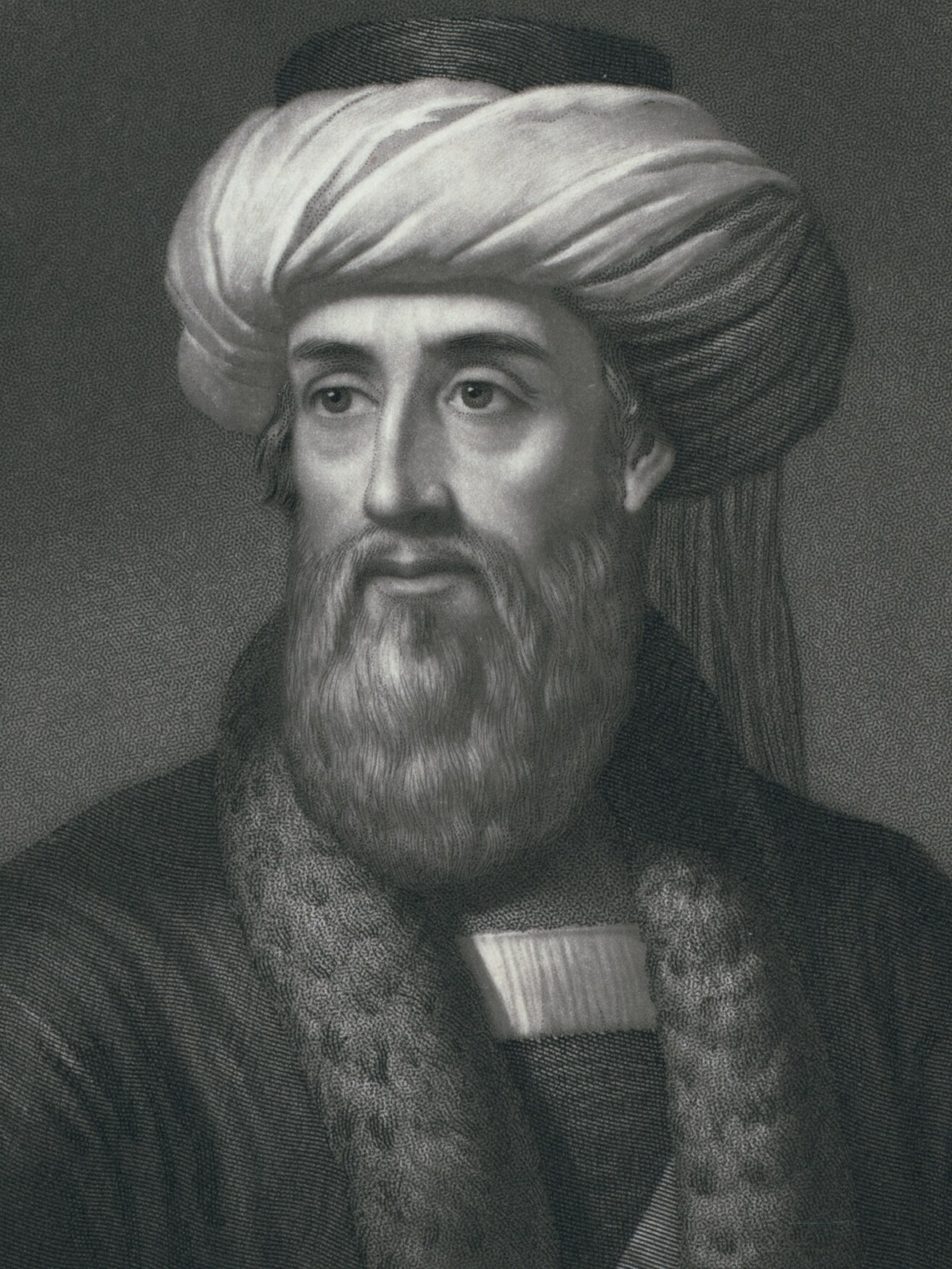
Josephus

Josephus, a Jewish historian in the 1st century, gives the first extant reference to gates constructed by Alexander, designed to be a barrier against the Scythians.

According to this historian, the people whom the Greeks called Scythians were known (among the Jews) as Magogites, descendants of the group called Magog in the Hebrew Bible. Josephus makes these references in two of his works.

- The Jewish War states that the iron gates Alexander erected were controlled by the king of Hyrcania (on the south edge of the Caspian), and allowing passage of the gates to the Alans (whom Josephus considered a Scythic tribe) resulted in the sack of Media.
- Antiquities of the Jews contains two relevant passages, one giving the ancestry of Scythians as descendants of Magog son of Japheth, and another that refers to the Caspian Gates being breached by Scythians allied to Tiberius during the Armenian War.

=== Cosmology ===
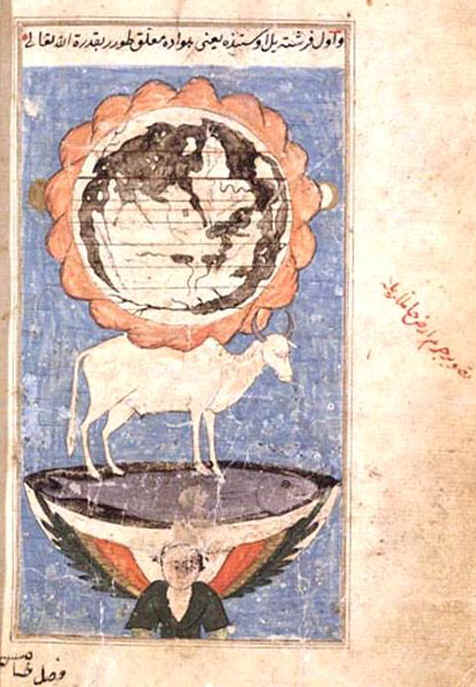
This map depicts "a traditional Islamic projection of the world as a flat disk surrounded by the sundering seas which are restrained by the encircling mountains of Qaf".

"And [he] shaped the earth as a carpet then he ordained it, [the area] under the firmament [are] just like those he uplifted"

— Dīwān, Umayya ibn Abī al‐Ṣalt, p. 179 cited in Click here for the poem in Arabic.

Before the introduction of Greek cosmology into the Islamic world, Muslims viewed the Earth as flat. The Quran assumes a flat Earth because it describes the Earth's vastness and flatness^{[Quran 51:48 (Translated by Yusuf Ali)]} comparable to pieces of flat furniture like a carpet, bed, or couch. By the 10th century, Islamic scholars learned of astronomical advances and reinterpreted scriptures to state that the Earth was spherical.

Muslim traditionalists who rejected Greek and Ptolemaic cosmological advances continued to hold this view, while various theologians held opposing views.

The main article discusses how critics challenge interpretations of Quranic Earth verses that rely on local flatness, non-literal meanings, or lack of context.

See Flat Earth § Middle East: Islamic scholars

=== Criticism ===
"From a linguistic standpoint, it is quite possible for a word, phrase or statement to have more than one layer of meaning, such that one layer would make sense to one audience in one age and another layer of meaning would, without negating the first, be meaningful to another audience in a subsequent age."

— Muntasir Mir

For Muslims, the Quran serves as a guide for theology, morality, and the relationship between humankind and God. This belief is compatible with the doctrine of Quranic inerrancy — which asserts that the Quran is the infallible and inerrant word of God, revealed to Muhammad by archangel Gabriel in the 7th century CE.

However, many scholars argue that when the Quran mentions items of the natural world — like astronomy or the way humans develop before birth — these passages are there to provoke reflections rather than convey scientific knowledge. They argue the Quran isn't a science textbook, but a poetic 7th-century Arabian work on observations of nature, lacking modern scientific features like citations or experiments. For example, matching vague verses to modern discoveries relies on retroactive interpretation (post hoc fitting), and some literal descriptions align with 7th-century Greco-Roman or Near Eastern folk science rather than modern scientific consensus. Lastly, it is noted a perfect communicator would not have included misleading statements in the Quran.

The following scholars offered their views on the Scientific miracles and the attempt to link the Qur'an to modern scientific theories.

- Ziauddin Sardar states that it requires "considerable mental gymnastics and distortions to find scientific facts or theories in these verses."
- Zafar Ishaq Ansari argues from the perspective of Islam that while the Quran is the source of guidance in right faith Iman and righteous action (alladhina amanu wa amilu l-salihat), the notion of it containing "all knowledge, including scientific" knowledge is not a mainstream view among Muslim scholarship.
- Hamza Tzortzis, an Islamic intellectual and researcher, argued in his essay – "Does the Qur'an Contain Scientific Miracles? A new approach." — "The Qur'an is a book of ayat (signs), not a science textbook. Trying to force a scientific reading upon the text commits the fallacy of scientism and ignores the linguistic and historical context of the Arabic language."
- Nidhal Guessoum, an Algerian astrophysicist, points out in his book Islam's Quantum Question: Reconciling Muslim Tradition and Modern Science, critiques the popularized claims of "scientific miracles." He argues that science is constantly shifting based on fresh evidence. Religious writings offer timeless wisdom on spiritual and ethical matters. Tying the Quran to mutable scientific theories, he warns, harms the text's credibility.

The back-and-forth arguments of the nature of the Quran far exceed the scope of this article section. This section singled out a mere fraction of the disagreements. Other articles detailing these issues are listed below.

== Ethics ==
Akhlaq, أخلاق., is the Arabic term for ethics. Key Islamic ethics include Divine Oneness, God-consciousness, Justice, Mercy, and Trustworthiness. These values originate from the Quran, the Hadith (the Prophet Muhammad's life), and the teachings of key Islamic scholars and leaders.

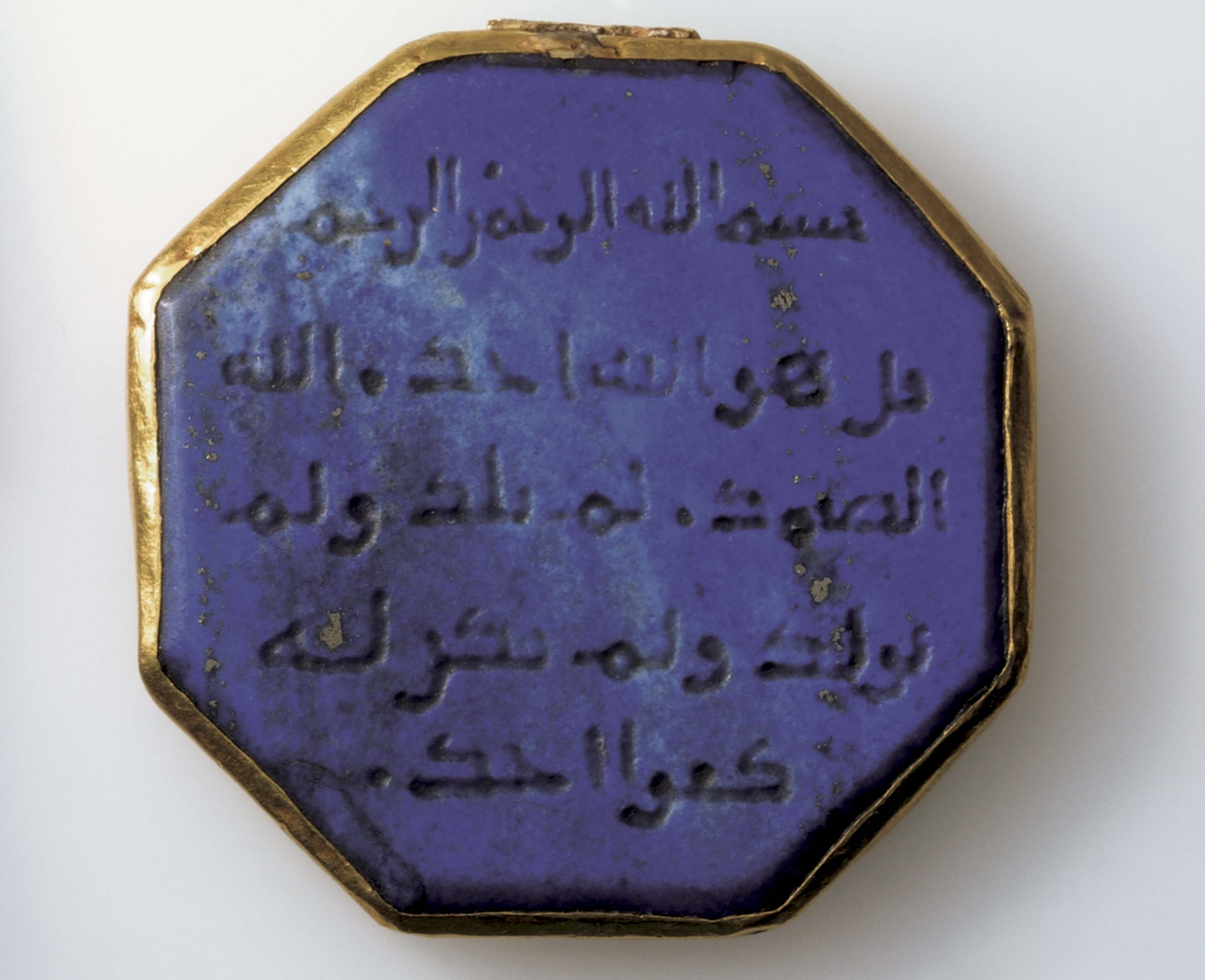
surah al-Ikhlas (v1 – 4), which gives the bearer protection against evils and dangers.

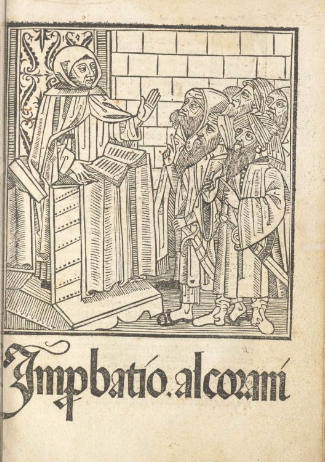
polemical work critiquing the Quran and Islam - Christian friar preaching to Muslims

=== Islamic ethics criticism ===
Certain critics perceive the Quran's ethical framework as a step backward from the moral progress manifested in Judaism and Christianity, even though the Quran states it builds upon earlier faiths. The subsequent two cases serve as examples.

- The Catholic Encyclopedia states that:

"The ethics of Islam are far inferior to those of Judaism and even more inferior to those of the New Testament" and "that in the ethics of Islam there is a great deal to admire and to approve, is beyond dispute; but of originality or superiority, there is none."

- William Montgomery Watt, however, finds Muhammad's changes an improvement for his time and place:

"In his day and generation Muhammad was a social reformer, indeed a reformer even in the sphere of morals. He created a new system of social security and a new family structure, both of which were a vast improvement on what went before. By taking what was best in the morality of the nomad and adapting it for settled communities, he established a religious and social framework for the life of many races of men."

=== Islam and violence ===
"Lo! those who disbelieve (Kafir), among the People of the Scripture and the idolaters, will abide in fire of hell. They are the worst of created beings."^{[Quran 98:6]}

Today, the Quran contains oral recitations made by Muhammad over 23 years in different times, places, contexts, and situations. Because context, interpretation, and translation are all important for the understanding of violence in our world, it's impossible to say how many verses in the Quran are violent, what one person thinks is violent language, another person might take as historical or advice on self-defense. Even studying the verses frequently cited for warfare should be done in context and in relation to the historical events that have led to them. These warfare passages are typically classified into defense, strict warnings, and the controversial "Sword Verse."

To put it simply, the verses frequently used to prove the Quran’s inherent violence are usually removed from their original context.

When the commonly cited "violent verses" are examined in their proper context, an altogether different picture emerges. People who attempt to justify a particular viewpoint often quote the verses presented below out of their original context.

- ... And kill them wherever you overtake them and expel them from where they have expelled you, and fitnah [persecution] is worse than killing ...Surah Al-Baqara ^{[Quran 2:190-193]}
  "Fight in the cause of Allah those who fight you, but do not transgress limits". It contains the phrase "kill them wherever you overtake them" but pairs it with the restriction "if they cease, let there be no hostility except against oppressors".
- ... seize them and kill them wherever you find them ...Surah An-Nisa ^{[Quran 4:89]}
  This verse sounds ominous on its own. However, the verse targets 7th-century groups fighting Muhammad's community. The following verse clarifies the context:
  " ... except those who join a group between whom and you there is a treaty or those who approach you with hearts restraining them from fighting you as well as fighting their people ..."Surah An-Nisa ^{[Quran 4:90]}
- ... I will cast terror into the hearts of those who disbelieved ...Surah Al-Anfal ^{[Quran 8:12]}
  This is one of many verses in Surah 8 that the Prophet recited concerning the Battle of Badr Arabic: غَزْوَةُ بَدْرٍ, a conflict where Muhammad's forces, numbering around three hundred, faced a significantly larger Meccan army of thousands. This phrase represents God's instruction to the angels deployed into the heart of the conflict, where the 313 members of Muhammad's Community engaged a significantly larger adversary.
- ... so when you meet those who disbelieve, strike [their] necks until, when you have inflicted slaughter on them ...Surah Muhammad ^{[Quran 47:4]}
  Another verse recited during the Battle of Badr Arabic: غَزْوَةُ بَدْرٍ, by the army of Muhammad's community. The condition "Until the war (Al Harb Arabic: الحرب) lays down its burdens" qualifies this order, providing a clear context for anyone reading the verse in full.
- ... And when the sacred months have passed, then kill the polytheists wherever you find them and capture them and besiege them and sit in wait for them at every place of ambush ...Surah At-Tawbah ^{[Quran 9:5]}
  The sword verse concerns tribes engaged in conflict with Muhammad's followers. The subsequent verse, 9:6, however, offers a clearer understanding of the verse that came before it.
  ... And if any one of the polytheists seeks your protection, then grant him protection so that he may hear the words of Allah. Then deliver him to his place of safety.Surah At-Tawbah ^{[Quran 9:6]}

Alexis de Tocqueville (1805–1859), a French political thinker and historian, observed:
"I studied the Quran a great deal. I came away from that study with the conviction that by and large there have been few religions in the world as deadly to men as that of Muhammad. As far as I can see, it is the principal cause of the decadence so visible today in the Muslim world and, though less absurd than the polytheism of old, its social and political tendencies are in my opinion more to be feared, and I therefore regard it as a form of decadence rather than a form of progress in relation to paganism."

=== The sword verse ===
The Quran, chapter 9 (At-Tawba), verses 2–6:

The Sword Verse (Arabic: آية السيف) is the fifth verse of the ninth surah (at-Tawbah) of the Quran Of the 6,236 Quranic verses, the verse commonly referred to as the "Sword Verse" (Surah At-Tawbah, 9:5) is among the most contentious passages and the most discussed verse within the Quran. Critics and violent extremists often employed this verse as a cloak for their acts of violence and to support their narrative of Islam's inherent aggression. They believe individuals or groups looking for a pretext to commit a violent act refuse to contextualize the verse with subsequent passages. These parties might refuse to examine the verse's historical setting. The sword verse reads as follows:

"Then, when the sacred months have passed, slay the idolaters wherever ye find them, and take them (captive), and besiege them, and prepare for them each ambush. But if they repent and establish worship and pay the zakat, then leave their way free. Lo! Allah is Forgiving, Merciful."

— ^{[Quran 9:5–5 (Translated by Pickthall)]}

When scholars state that the verse is used out of context, they suggest that verses five and six need to be read together. Verse 6 reads:

"And if anyone of the idolaters seeketh thy protection (O Muhammad), then protect him so that he may hear the Word of Allah, and afterward convey him to his place of safety. That is because they are a folk who know not."

— ^{[Quran 9:6–6 (Translated by Pickthall)]}

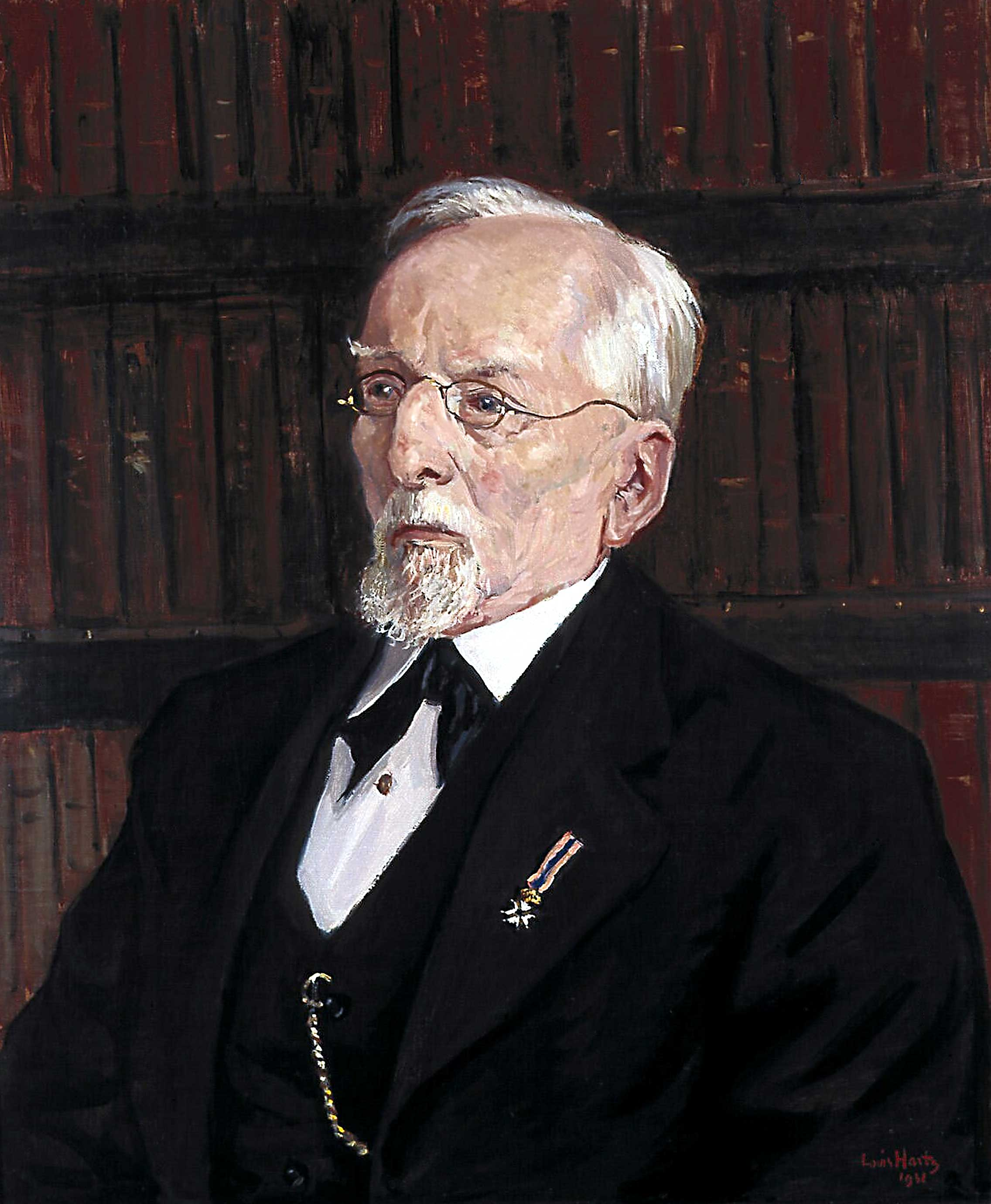
Portrait of M. Th. Houtsma (1931)

Professor and orientalist Martijn Theodoor Houtsma (1851–1943), best known as the editor of Volume 4 of the First Encyclopedia of Islam, (1913–1936) observed that – the Sword verse targeted the unbelieving Meccans who aimed to "refute and revile the Prophet." Muslims were initially advised to adopt a cautious approach regarding the kafir. Later, Muslims were ordered to separate from non-believers, defend themselves from attacks, and even take the offensive. Most passages in the Quran referring to unbelievers discuss their fate on Judgment Day and their eternal destination in hell.

Houtsma also stated –
"Tolerance may in no circumstances be extended to the apostate, the renegade Muslim, whose punishment is death. Some authorities allow the remission of this punishment if the apostate recants. Others insist on the death penalty even then. God may pardon him the world to come; the law must punish him in this world."

=== Criticism of inherent Islamic violence ===
According to Dr Juan Cole, discussing his book "Muhammad, Prophet of Peace and Clash of Empires" –
"The Qur’anic verses commanding self-defense have been cherry-picked by anti-Muslim writers and by small cells of extremists to depict the Prophet and the community as militant. This is far from accurate—the Qur’an says, however, “Fight in the path of God those who enter into combat against you, but do not commit aggression. God does not love aggressors.” Throughout the Quran, I always hear Muslims say that every time the Quran got violent it was "Out of context" or "In self defense." My question is: Is there a genuine verse in the Quran that involved Islamic violence that was not in the form of "self-defense"?

=== War and peace ===
The Quran's teachings on matters of war and peace are widely debated. On the one hand, some critics, such as Sam Harris, interpret certain verses of the Quran as sanctioning military action against unbelievers as a whole both during the lifetime of Muhammad and after. Harris argues that Muslim extremism is simply a consequence of taking the Quran literally, and is skeptical about significant reform toward a "moderate Islam" in the future. (Note: Harris makes a similar argument about hadith, saying "[a]ccording to a literalist reading of the hadith (the literature that recounts the sayings and the actions of the Prophet) if a Muslim decides that he no longer wants to be a Muslim, he should be put to death. If anyone ventures the opinion that the Koran is a mediocre book of religious fiction or that Muhammad was a schizophrenic, he should also be killed. It should go without saying that a desire to kill people for imaginary crimes like apostasy and blasphemy is not an expression of religious moderation." "Who Are the Moderate Muslims?," The Huffington Post, 16 February 2006 (accessed 16 November 2013))

Conversely, other scholars contend that these Quranic verses are explained out of context and Muslims of the Ahmadiyya movement argue that, when read in context, the verses clearly prohibit aggression and permit fighting only in self-defense.

Dr. Gottlieb Wilhelm Leitner (founder of the Oriental Institute, UK) published in Asiatic Quarterly Review, 1886 – "Jihad, even when explained as a righteous effort of waging war in self-defense against the grossest outrage on one's religion, is strictly limited ..."

Khaleel Mohammed, professor of religious studies at San Diego State University, states, regarding his discussion with the critic Robert B. Spencer:

"when I am told ... that Jihad only means war, or that I have to accept interpretations of the Quran that non-Muslims (with no good intentions or knowledge of Islam) seek to force upon me, I see a certain agendum developing: one that is based on hate, and I refuse to be part of such an intellectual crime."

The author Syed Kamran Mirza has argued that a concept of 'Jihad', defined as 'struggle', was introduced by the Quran. He wrote that while Muhammad was in Mecca, he "did not have many supporters and was very weak compared to the Pagans", and "it was at this time he added some 'soft', peaceful verses", whereas "almost all the hateful, coercive and intimidating verses later in the Quran were made with respect to Jihad" when Muhammad was in Medina.

Other authors have argued:

- Micheline R. Ishay has argued that "the Quran justifies wars for self-defense to protect Islamic communities against internal or external aggression by non-Islamic populations, and wars waged against those who 'violate their oaths' by breaking a treaty".
- Mufti M. Mukarram Ahmed has also argued that the Quran encourages people to fight in self-defense. He has also argued that the Quran has been used to direct Muslims to make all possible preparations to defend themselves against enemies.
- Shin Chiba and Thomas J. Schoenbaum argue that Islam "does not allow Muslims to fight against those who disagree with them regardless of belief system", but instead "urges its followers to treat such people kindly".
- Yohanan Friedmann has argued that the Quran does not promote fighting for the purposes of religious coercion, although the war as described is "religious" in the sense that the enemies of the Muslims are described as "enemies of God".
- Rodrigue Tremblay has argued that the Quran commands that non-Muslims under a Muslim regime should "feel themselves subdued" in "a political state of subservience." He also argues that the Quran may assert freedom within religion.
- Nisrine Abiad has argued that the Quran incorporates the offence (and due punishment) of "rebellion" into the offence of "highway or armed robbery."
- George W. Braswell has argued that the Quran asserts an idea of Jihad to deal with "a sphere of disobedience, ignorance and war."
- Michael David Bonner has argued that the "deal between God and those who fight is portrayed as a commercial transaction, either as a loan with interest, or else as a profitable sale of the life of this world in return for the life of the next", where "how much one gains depends on what happens during the transaction", either "paradise if slain in battle, or victory if one survives".

Critics have argued that the Quran "glorified Jihad in many of the Medinese suras" and "criticized those who fail(ed) to participate in it".

- Ali Ünal has claimed that the Quran praises the companions of Muhammad for being stern and implacable against the said unbelievers, where in that "period of ignorance and savagery, triumphing over these people was possible by being strong and unyielding."
- Solomon Nigosian concludes that the "Quranic statement is clear" on the issue of fighting in defense of Islam as "a duty that is to be carried out at all costs", where "God grants security to those Muslims who fight in order to halt or repel aggression".
- Shaikh M. Ghazanfar argues that the Quran has been used to teach its followers that "the path to human salvation does not require withdrawal from the world but rather encourages moderation in worldly affairs", including fighting.
- Shabbir Akhtar has argued that the Quran asserts that if a people "fear Muhammad more than they fear God, 'they are a people lacking in sense'" rather than a fear being imposed upon them by God directly.

Various calls to arms were identified in the Quran by Mohammed Reza Taheri-azar, all of which were cited as "most relevant to my actions on March 3, 2006," after he committed a terrorist attack that injured 9 people.

=== Violence against women ===
Verse 4:34 of the Quran, as translated by Ali Quli Qara'i, reads:

Men are the managers of women, because of the advantage Allah has granted some of them over others, and by virtue of their spending out of their wealth. So righteous women are obedient, care-taking in the absence [of their husbands] of what Allah has enjoined [them] to guard. As for those [wives] whose misconduct you fear, [first] advise them, and [if ineffective] keep away from them in the bed, and [as the last resort] strike them. Then if they obey you, do not seek any course [of action] against them. Indeed, Allah is all-exalted, all-great.

Many translations do not necessarily imply a chronological sequence, for example, Marmaduke Pickthall's, Muhammad Muhsin Khan's, or Arthur John Arberry's. Arberry's translation reads "admonish; banish them to their couches, and beat them."

The Dutch film Submission, which rose to fame outside the Netherlands after the assassination of its director Theo van Gogh by Muslim extremist Mohammed Bouyeri, critiqued this and similar verses of the Quran by displaying them painted on the bodies of abused Muslim women. Ayaan Hirsi Ali, the film's writer, said "it is written in the Koran a woman may be slapped if she is disobedient. This is one of the evils I wish to point out in the film".

Scholars of Islam have a variety of responses to these criticisms. (See An-Nisa, 34 for a fuller exegesis on the meaning of the text.) Some Muslim scholars say that the "striking" allowed is limited to no more than a light touch with a siwak, or toothbrush. Some Muslims argue that striking is only appropriate if a woman has done "an unrighteous, wicked and rebellious act" beyond mere disobedience. In many modern interpretations of the Quran, the actions prescribed in 4:34 are to be taken in sequence, and striking is only to be used as a last resort. (Note: Abdullah Yusuf Ali in his Quranic commentary states that: "In case of family jars, four steps are mentioned, to be taken in that order. (1) Perhaps verbal advice or admonition may be sufficient; (2) if not, sex relations may be suspended; (3) if this is not sufficient, some slight physical correction may be administered; but Imam Shafi'i considers this inadvisable, though permissible, and all authorities are unanimous in deprecating any sort of cruelty, even of the nagging kind, as mentioned in the next clause; (4) if all this fails, a family council is recommended in 4:35 below." Abdullah Yusuf Ali, The Holy Quran: Text, Translation and Commentary (commentary on 4:34), Amana Corporation, Brentwood, MD, 1989. ISBN 0-915957-03-5) (Note: Yusuf al-Qaradawi, head of the European Council for Fatwa and Research, says that "If the husband senses that feelings of disobedience and rebelliousness are rising against him in his wife, he should try his best to rectify her attitude by kind words, gentle persuasion, and reasoning with her. If this is not helpful, he should sleep apart from her, trying to awaken her agreeable feminine nature so that serenity may be restored, and she may respond to him in a harmonious fashion. If this approach fails, it is permissible for him to beat her lightly with his hands, avoiding her face and other sensitive parts.)

Many Islamic scholars and commentators have emphasized that striking, where permitted, is not to be harsh. Yusuf al-Qaradawi, head of the European Council for Fatwa and Research, says that "It is permissible for him to beat her lightly with his hands, avoiding her face and other sensitive parts. In no case should he resort to using a stick or any other instrument that might cause pain and injury." Ibn Kathir Ad-Damishqee records in his Tafsir Al-Quran Al-Azim that Ibn `Abbas and several others said, – "the Ayah refers to a beating that is not violent. Al-Hasan Al-Basri said that it means a beating that is not severe" or even that it should be "more or less symbolic." One such authority is the earliest hafiz, Ibn Abbas. According to Abdullah Yusuf Ali and Ibn Kathir, the consensus of Islamic scholars is that the above verse describes a light striking, with the passage was quoted from commentary on 4:34.

Some jurists argue that even when striking is acceptable under the Quran, it is still discountenanced. (Note: Sayyid Abul Ala Maududi comments that "Whenever the Prophet (peace be on him) permitted a man to administer corporal punishment to his wife, he did so with reluctance, and continued to express his distaste for it. And even in cases where it is necessary, the Prophet (peace be on him) directed men not to hit across the face, nor to beat severely, nor to use anything that might leave marks on the body." "Towards Understanding the Quran" Translation by Zafar I. Ansari from "Tafheem Al-Quran" (specifically, commentary on 4:34) by Syed Abul-A'ala Mawdudi, Islamic Foundation, Leicester, England.)

Shabbir Akhtar has argued that the Quran introduced prohibitions against "the pre-Islamic practice of female infanticide" (16:58, 17:31, 81:8), which is intended to provide a basis for women's rights. Additionally, Dr. Mustafa Khattab in his book The Clear Quran writes on if women are abused:

The Quran makes it clear that men and women are equal before God and the Law (16:97 and 33:35). Abuses against some Muslim women (e.g. honour killing and forced marriages) are cultural practices in some Muslim countries that contradict Islamic teachings.

=== Houris ===
Max I. Dimont interprets that the houris described in the Quran are specifically dedicated to "male pleasure". Alternatively, Annemarie Schimmel says that the Quranic description of the houris should be viewed in a context of love; "every pious man who lives according to God's order will enter Paradise where rivers of milk and honey flow in cool, fragrant gardens and virgin beloveds await home..."

In the Syro-Aramaic Reading of the Quran by Christoph Luxenberg, the words translating to "Houris" or "Virgins of Paradise" are instead interpreted as "Fruits (grapes)" and "high climbing (wine) bowers... made into first fruits." Luxenberg offers alternate interpretations of these Quranic verses, including the idea that the Houris should be seen as having a specifically spiritual nature rather than a human nature; "these are all very sensual ideas; but there are also others of a different kind... what can be the object of cohabitation in Paradise as there can be no question of its purpose in the world, the preservation of the race. The solution of this difficulty is found by saying that, although heavenly food, women .., have the name in common with their earthly equivalents, it is only by way of metaphorical indication and comparison without actual identity... authors have spiritualized the Houris."

== Christians and Jews in the Quran ==
The Quran mentions more than 50 people previously mentioned in the Bible, a text that it predates by several centuries.

Jane Gerber claims that the Quran ascribes negative traits to Jews, such as cowardice, greed, and chicanery. She also alleges that the Quran associates Jews with interconfessional strife and rivalry (Quran 2:113), the Jewish belief that they alone are beloved of God (Quran 5:18), and that only they will achieve salvation (Quran 2:111). According to the Encyclopedia Judaica, the Quran contains many attacks on Jews and Christians for their refusal to recognize Muhammad as a prophet. In the Muslim view, the crucifixion of Jesus was an illusion, and thus the Jewish plots against him ended in failure. In numerous verses the Quran accuses Jews of altering the Scripture. Karen Armstrong claims that there are "far more numerous passages in the Quran" which speak positively of the Jews and their great prophets, than those which were against the "rebellious Jewish tribes of Medina" (during Muhammad's time). Sayyid Abul Ala believes the punishments were not meant for all Jews, and that they were only meant for the Jewish inhabitants who were sinning at the time. According to historian John Tolan, the Quran contains a verse that criticizes the Christian worship of Jesus Christ as God, as well as other practices and doctrines of both Judaism and Christianity. Despite this, the Quran has high praise for these religions, regarding them as the other two members of the Abrahamic triad.

The Christian doctrine of the Trinity states that God is a single being who exists, simultaneously and eternally, as a communion of three distinct persons, the Father, the Son, and the Holy Spirit. In Islam, such plurality in God is considered a denial of monotheism and thus a sin of shirk, which is considered to be a major 'al-Kaba'ir' sin.

In the Quran, polytheism is considered the eternal sin of shirk, meaning that Jews and Christians, which the Quran calls polytheists (see below), will not be pardoned by God if they do not repent of shirk.

The Quran states that Jews are exalting Ezra as a son of God and for taking their rabbis as "their lords in derogation of God", (Quran 9:30) and should believe in Islam lest a punishment befalls them that turns them into "apes and pigs". (Quran 5:60)(Quran 7:166)

== Hindu criticism ==
Hindu Swami Dayanand Saraswati gave a brief analysis of the Quran in the 14th chapter of his 19th-century book Satyarth Prakash. He calls the concept of Islam highly offensive, and doubts that there is any connection between Islam and God:

Had the God of the Quran been the Lord of all creatures, and been Merciful and kind to all, he would never have commanded the Muhammedans to slaughter men of other faiths, and animals, etc. If he [God] is Merciful, won't he show mercy even to the sinners? If the answer be given in the affirmative, it [the Quran] cannot be true, because further on it is said in the Quran "Put infidels to the sword," in other words, he that does not believe in the Quran, and Muhammad is an infidel [he should, therefore, be put to death]. Since the Quran sanctions such cruelty to non-Muslims and innocent creatures such as cows it can never be the Word of God.

On the other hand, Mahatma Gandhi, the moral leader of the 20th-century Indian independence movement, found the significance of non-violence in the Quran, but the history of Muslims to be aggressive, which is criticized by Muslims themselves based on Quranic consultative concept of Shura, while he claimed that Hindus have passed that stage of societal evolution:

Though, in my opinion, non-violence has a predominant place in the Quran, the thirteen hundred years of imperialistic expansion have made the Muslims fighters as a body. They are therefore aggressive. Bullying is the natural excrescence of an aggressive spirit. The Hindu has an ages-old civilization. He is essentially non-violent. His civilization has already undergone what the two recent ones are still passing through. If Hinduism was ever imperialistic in the modern sense of the term, it has outlived its imperialism and has either deliberately or as a matter of course given it up. Predominance of the non-violent spirit has restricted the use of arms to a small minority which must always be subordinate to a civil power, highly spiritual, learned, and selfless.

== See also ==
- Apostasy in Islam
- Bibliography of books critical of Islam
- Bibliolatry
- Censorship in Islamic societies
- Criticism of Hadith
- Criticism of Islam
- Criticism of Muhammad
- Homosexuality and Islam
- Islam and antisemitism
- Islam and domestic violence
- Islamic terrorism
- Islamic views on slavery
- Islamofascism
- Quran desecration
- Attempted imitations of the Quran
- The Syro-Aramaic Reading of the Koran
- Violence in the Quran
- War against Islam
- Women in Islam

== Sources ==
=== Bibliography ===
- Abiad, Nisrine (2008). Sharia, Muslim States and International Human Rights Treaty Obligations: A Comparative Study. British Institute for International & Comparative Law (BIICL). p. 24. ISBN 978-1-905221-41-7.
- Adh-Dhahabi, Shams al-Din (2018). Al-Kabair: The Major Sins (Arabic-English) (in English and Arabic). Translated by Siddiqui, Mohammad Moinuddin. Idara Impex. ISBN 978-9386345257.
- Aga Khan III, Sir Sultan Muhammad Shah (1954). "Chapter 2: Islam, The Religion of My Ancestors". The Memoirs of Aga Khan: World Enough and Time. London: Cassell and Company Ltd.
- Ahmad, Mukarram (2005). Encyclopaedia of Islam – 25 Vols. New Delhi: Anmol Publications Pvt. Ltd. ISBN 81-261-2339-7.
- Ahmed, Shahab (2001). "Satanic Verses". In McAuliffe, Jane Dammen (ed.). Encyclopaedia of the Qurʾān: EQ. Leiden: Brill. pp. 533–535. ISBN 978-90-04-14743-0.
- Akhtar, Shabbir (31 October 2007). The Quran and the Secular Mind: A Philosophy of Islam. Routledge. ISBN 978-1-134-07256-9.
- al-Bayḍāwī, ʿAbdallāh ibn ʿUmar (1847). Fleischer, H. O. (ed.). Anwār al-tanzīl wa-asrār al-taʾwīl (in Arabic). Vol. 2. Leipzig. p. 6. "volumes published betwee 1846-1848"
- al-Jawaliqi, Abu Mansur Mauhub (1942). Shakir, Ahmad Muhammad (ed.). Al-mu'arrab min al-kalam al-a'jami 'ala huruf al-mu'jam (in Arabic). Cairo: Matba'at Dar al-Kutub. p. 3.
- Al-Rafe'ie, Mustafa Sadiq (1995). I'jāz al-Qur'ān wa-al-Balāghah al-Nabawiyyah [The Miraculous Nature of the Qurʾān and the Prophetic Rhetoric] (in Arabic). Cairo: Dar al-Fikr al-'Arabi.
- al-Razi, Abu Hatim (2012). The Proofs of Prophecy: A Parallel Arabic-English Text. Islamic Translation Series. Translated by Khalidi, Tarif. Brigham Young University Press. ISBN 978-0-8425-2787-3.
- al-Shahrastani, Muhammad ibn Abd al-Karim (2013) [First published 1984]. Muslim Sects and Divisions: The Section on Muslim Sects in Kitāb al-Milal wa 'l-Nihal. Translated by Kazi, A. K.; Flynn, J. G. Routledge. ISBN 978-0-7103-0175-8.
- al-Suyuti, Jalal al-Din (1925). "38". Al-Itqan fi Ulum al-Quran. Vol. 1. Cairo: Al-Matba'ah al-Amiriyah. pp. 135–141.
- Al-Suyuti, 'Abd al-Rahman Jalal al-Din (1963). Asbab al-Nuzul. Vol. 1. Cairo: Dar al-Tahrir. p. 28.
- al-Zarkashi, Badr al-Din (1957) [c. 1390]. Ibrahim, Muhammad Abu al-Fadl (ed.). Al-Burhan fi 'Ulum al-Qur'an [The Proof in the Sciences of the Qur'an] (in Arabic). Vol. 4. Cairo: Dar Ihya al-Kutub al-Arabiyyah.
- Ali, Abdullah Yusuf (1989). The Holy Qurʼān: Text, translation, and commentary (4th ed.). Brentwood, MD: Amana Corp. ISBN 9780915957033.
- Ali, Unal (2008). The Quran with Annotated Interpretation in Modern English. Rutherford, N.J: The Light, Inc. ISBN 978-1-59784-144-3.
- Anchassi, Omar; Gleave, Robert (21 November 2024). Islamic Law in Context: A Primary Source Reader. Cambridge University Press. ISBN 978-1-009-01368-0.
- Andrae, Tor (1923). Der Ursprung des Islams und das Christentum. Skrifter utgivna av Kyrkohistoriska föreningen (in German). Vol. 1:23. Uppsala: Almqvist & Wiksell.
- Badawī, 'Abd al-Raḥmān (1993). Min Tārīkh al-Ilḥād fī al-Islām (من تاريخ الإلحاد في الإسلام) (in Arabic) (2nd ed.). Cairo: Sīnā lil-Nashr. p. 216.
- Black, E. Ann; Esmaeili, Hossein; Hosen, Nadirsyah (2014). Modern Perspectives on Islamic Law. Edward Elgar Publishing. pp. 222–223. ISBN 978-0857934475.
- Bashear, Suliman (1997). Arabs and Others in Early Islam. Studies in Late Antiquity and Early Islam. Vol. 8. Princeton, New Jersey: Darwin Press. ISBN 978-0-87850-126-7.
- Bell, Richard (1926). The Origin of Islam in its Christian Environment: The Gunning Lectures, Edinburgh University, 1925. London: Macmillan and Co., Limited.
- Bell, Richard; Watt, William Montgomery (1970). Bell's Introduction to the Qurʼān. Edinburgh University Press. ISBN 978-0-7486-0597-2.
- Bell, Richard; Watt, R. (1977). Bell's Introduction to the Qurʼān. Edinburgh: University Press.
- Bietenholz, Peter G. (1994). Historia and Fabula: Myths and Legends in Historical Thought from Antiquity to the Modern Age. BRILL. ISBN 978-90-04-10063-3.
- Block, Corrie (8 October 2013). The Qur'an in Christian-Muslim Dialogue: Historical and Modern Interpretations. Routledge. ISBN 9781135014056.
- Bonner, Michael David (2006). Jihad in Islamic history: doctrines and practice. Princeton, N.J: Princeton University Press. ISBN 0-691-12574-0.
- Böwering, Gerhard (2008). "Recent Research on the Construction of the Quran". In Reynolds, Gabriel Said (ed.). The Quran in its Historical Context. Routledge.
- Braswell, George W. (2000). What you need to know about Islam & Muslims. Nashville, TN: Broadman & Holman Publishers. ISBN 0-8054-1829-6.
- Bucaille, Maurice (1976). The Bible, the Qur'an and Science: The Holy Scriptures Examined in the Light of Modern Knowledge. Thinker's Library. ISBN 978-967-69-0284-9.
- Burton, John (1977). The Collection of the Qur'an. Cambridge University Press. pp. 141–142. ISBN 978-0-521-29112-5.
- Burton, John (1979). The Collection of the Quran. United Kingdom: Cambridge University Press. ISBN 0521214394.
- Burton, John (1990). The Sources of Islamic Law: Islamic Theories of Abrogation. Edinburgh: Edinburgh University Press. pp. xi, 235. ISBN 978-0-7486-0108-0. OCLC 20948867. "citing Ahmad b. `Ali b. Muhammad al `Asqalani, ibn Hajar, "Fath al Bari", 13 vols, Cairo, 1939/1348, vol. 9, p. 18"
- Busse, Heribert (1979). Die Islamische Welt zwischen Mittelalter und Neuzeit: Festschrift für Hans Robert Roemer zum 65. Beirut and Wiesbaden. ISBN 9783515018456.
- Campo, Juan E. (2009). "Ethics and morality". Encyclopedia of Islam. Infobase. pp. 214–216. ISBN 9781438126968.
- Carlyle, Thomas (1841). On Heroes, Hero-Worship and the Heroic in History. pp. 64–67.
- Churton, Tobias (9 September 2009). The Invisible History of the Rosicrucians. Inner Traditions / Bear & Co. ISBN 9781594779312.
- Cole, Juan (9 October 2018). Muhammad: Prophet of Peace Amid the Clash of Empires. PublicAffairs. ISBN 978-1-56858-782-0.
- Collins, Adela (2007). Mark. Fortress Press. ISBN 978-0800660789.
- Cook, Michael (1983). Muhammad (in Tagalog). Oxford; New York: Oxford University Press. ISBN 0-19-287605-8.
- Cook, Michael (24 February 2000). The Koran: A Very Short Introduction. OUP Oxford. ISBN 978-0-19-285344-8.
- Crone, Patricia (1987). Meccan Trade and the Rise of Islam. Princeton University Press. ISBN 978-0-691-05480-3.
- Dashti, Ali (1985). Twenty Three Years: A Study of the Prophetic Career of Mohammad. Allen & Unwin. ISBN 978-0-04-297048-6.
- Decharneux, Julien (6 June 2023). Creation and Contemplation: The Cosmology of the Qur'ān and Its Late Antique Background. Walter de Gruyter GmbH & Co KG. ISBN 978-3-11-079408-3.
- Déroche, François (2013). Qur'ans of the Umayyads: a first overview. Brill Publishers. pp. 67–69.
- Donner, Fred McGraw (1998). Narratives of Islamic Origins: The Beginnings of Islamic Historical Writing. Darwin Press. ISBN 978-0-87850-127-4.
- Donner, Fred M. (2008). "The Qur'an in Recent Scholarship". In Reynolds, Gabriel Said (ed.). The Qur'an in its Historical Context. London: Routledge. pp. 29–50. ISBN 978-0415428354.
- Dundes, Alan (28 May 2003). Fables of the Ancients?: Folklore in the Qur'an. Lanham, MD: Rowman & Littlefield. p. 104. ISBN 978-0-7425-2672-3.
- Eddy, Paul Rhodes; Boyd, Gregory A. (2007). The Jesus Legend: A Case for the Historical Reliability of the Synoptic Jesus Tradition. Baker Academic. ISBN 978-0-8010-3114-4.
- Encyclopaedia Britannica: A Dictionary of Arts, Sciences, and General Literature. Vol. 16 (9th ed.). 1884.
- Epiphanius, of Salamis (2013). The Panarion of Epiphanius of Salamis, Books II and III. De Fide. Translated by Williams, Frank (Second ed.). Leiden: Brill. pp. 637–638. ISBN 978-90-04-22841-2.
- Esposito, J L (1991). Islam: the straight path. United Kingdom: Oxford University Press. pp. 19–20. ISBN 9780195062250.
- Friedmann, Yohanan (2003). Tolerance and coercion in Islam: interfaith relations in the Muslim tradition. Cambridge, UK: Cambridge University Press. pp. 94–95. ISBN 0-521-82703-5.
- Gauvain, Richard (2013). Salafi Ritual Purity: In the Presence of God. Abingdon, England: Routledge. ISBN 978-0710313560.
- Geiger, Abraham (1833). Was hat Mohammed aus dem Judenthume aufgenommen? Eine von der Königl. Preussischen Rheinuniversität gekrönte Preisschrift (in German). Bonn: F. Baaden. "(Reprint: Berlin: Parerga, 2205"
- Geisler, Norman L.; Saleeb, Abdul (2002). Answering Islam: The Crescent in Light of the Cross. Baker Books. ISBN 978-0-8010-6430-2.
- Ghazanfar, Shaikh M. (2003). Medieval Islamic economic thought: filling the "great gap" in European economics. London: RoutledgeCurzon. ISBN 0-415-29778-8.
- Gibb, H.A.R. (1953) [1949]. Mohammedanism : An Historical Survey (2nd ed.). Oxford University Press.
- Gillot, Claude (2008). "Reconsidering the Authorship of the Quran. Is the Quran party the fruit of a progressive and collective work?". In Reynolds, Gabriel Said (ed.). The Quran in its Historical Context. Routledge. pp. 88–108.
- Glassé, Cyril; Smith, Huston (1 January 2003). The New Encyclopedia of Islam. Rowman Altamira. ISBN 9780759101906.
- Gilchrist, John (1989). Jam' Al-Qur'an: The Codification of the Qur'an Text: A Comprehensive Study of the Original Collection of the Qur'an Text and the Early Surviving Qur'an Manuscripts. Benoni, South Africa: MERCSA.
- Goldziher, Ignáz (1981). Introduction to Islamic Theology and Law. Translated by Hamori, Andras; Hamori, Ruth. Princeton University Press. pp. 28–30. ISBN 978-0691100999.
- Guessoum, Nidhal (30 October 2010). Islam's Quantum Question: Reconciling Muslim Tradition and Modern Science. Bloomsbury Publishing. ISBN 978-0-85771-867-9.
- Guillaume, Alfred (1954). Islam. Pelican Books. Harmondsworth: Penguin Books. OCLC 9107976.
- Haleem, Muhammad Abdel (2001). Understanding the Qur'an: Themes and Style. London: I.B. Tauris. pp. 184–210.
- Hannam, James (2023). The Globe: How the Earth Became Round. Reaktion Books. pp. 178–193. ISBN 978-1-78914-758-2.
- Harris, Sam (2005). The End of Faith: Religion, Terror, and the Future of Reason. W. W. Norton; Reprint edition. ISBN 0-393-32765-5.
- Hashmi, Sohail H.; Miller, David (11 May 2021). Boundaries and Justice: Diverse Ethical Perspectives. Princeton University Press. ISBN 978-0-691-23093-1.
- Holland, Tom (2012). In the Shadow of the Sword. UK: Doubleday. ISBN 978-0-385-53135-1.
- Hollenberg, David; Rauch, Christoph; Schmidtke, Sabine (20 May 2015). The Yemeni Manuscript Tradition. BRILL. ISBN 978-90-04-28976-5.
- Houtsma, M. Th (1993). E. J. Brill's First Encyclopedia of Islam, 1913–1936, Volume 4. Touchstone. p. 619. ISBN 9789004097902.
- Ibn Hajar, al-Asqalani (1939). Fath al-Bari. Vol. 9. Cairo: al-Matba'ah al-Bahiyyah. p. 18.
- Ishaq, Ibn (2002). The Life of Muhammad. Translated by Guillaume, Alfred. p. 166. ISBN 0-19-636033-1.
- Ishay, Micheline (2 June 2008). The history of human rights. Berkeley: University of California. p. 45. ISBN 978-0-520-25641-5.
- Jany, János (2012). Judging in the Islamic, Jewish and Zoroastrian Legal Traditions: A Comparison of Theory and Practice. Ashgate. ISBN 978-1-4094-3716-1.
- Jeffery, Arthur (2007). The Foreign Vocabulary of the Qur'an. Read Books. ISBN 978-1-4067-0618-5.
- Kathir, Ibn (2000). Tafsir of Ibn Kathir. London: Al-Firdous Ltd. pp. 50–53.
- Khattab, Mustafa (2016). The Clear Quran: A Thematic English Translation (2nd ed.). Lombard, IL, USA: Book of Signs Foundation. ISBN 978-0-9773009-6-9.
- Kraemer, Joel L. (1992). Israel Oriental Studies XII. BRILL. ISBN 978-90-04-09584-7.
- Lambton, Ann K.S. (1956). Islam and Russia. p. 46.
- Leaman, Oliver (2 May 2006). The Qur'an: An Encyclopedia. Routledge. ISBN 978-1-134-33974-7.
- Leirvik, Oddbjørn (27 May 2010). Images of Jesus Christ in Islam (2nd ed.). New York: Bloomsbury Academic; 2nd edition. pp. 33–66. ISBN 978-1441181602.
- Lewis, Bernard (1984). "Notes to Chapter 1". The Jews of Islam. Greenwood Publishing Group. p. 194. ISBN 1-400810-23X.>
- Lippman, Thomas W. (1982). Understanding Islam : An Introduction to the Moslem World. New American Library.
- Ltd, Hymns Ancient & Modern (1996). ThirdWay. Hymns Ancient & Modern Ltd.
- Luxenberg, Christoph (2007). The Syro-Aramaic Reading of the Koran: A Contribution to the Decoding of the Language of the Koran. Berlin: Verlag Hans Schiler. ISBN 978-3-89930-088-8.
- Maqsood, Ruqaiyyah Waris (15 September 1994). Teach Yourself Islam. Teach Yourself World Faiths. Teach Yourself. ISBN 978-0-340-60901-9.
- Maudoodi, Syed Abul A`la (1970). Towards Understanding Islam. International Islamic Federation of Stusent Organizations.
- Mirza, Syed Kamran (2006). Kim Ezra Shienbaum; Jamal Hasan (eds.). An Exegesis on 'Jihad in Islam'. Vol. Beyond Jihad: Critical Voices from Inside Islam. Academica Press, LLC. ISBN 1-933146-19-2.
- Mu, Shamsu ed-Deen; Adh-Dhahabi, Shamsu El-Deen (1999). Major Sins : Al - Kaba' ir (in Arabic). Islamic Incorporated . for publishing &Distribution. ISBN 978-977-265-246-4.
- Nasser, Shady (9 November 2012). The Transmission of the Variant Readings of the Qur??n: The Problem of Taw?tur and the Emergence of Shaw?dhdh. BRILL. ISBN 978-90-04-24081-0.
- Nasser, Shady Hekmat (2013). The transmission of the variant readings of the Qurʼān: the problem of "tawātur" and the emergence of "shawādhdh". Leiden Boston: Brill. ISBN 978-90-04-24081-0.
- Nasr, Seyyed Hossein (2008) [1987]. "1. Quran as the Foundation of Islamic Spirituality (notes)". Islamic Spirituality: Foundations. Routledge. ISBN 9781134539024.
- Neuwirth, Angelika; Sells, Michael (14 April 2016). Qur'ānic Studies Today. Routledge. ISBN 978-1-317-29565-5.
- Nasr, Seyyed Hossein (2002). The Heart of Islam: Enduring Values for Humanity. San Francisco: HarperSanFrancisco. ISBN 978-0-06-073064-2.
- Netton, Ian Richard (1996). Text and Trauma: An East-West Primer. Curzon Press. ISBN 978-0-7007-0326-5.
- Nigosian, S. A. (2004). Islam: its history, teaching, and practices. Bloomington: Indiana University Press. ISBN 0-253-21627-3.
- Nöldeke, Theodor (1910). "Zur Sprache des Korāns". Neue Beiträge zur semitischen Sprachwissenschaft [Remarques critiques sur le style et la syntaxe du Coran] (in German). Translated by Bousquet, G.-H. Strassburg: Trübner. pp. 1–30.
- Ohlig, Karl-Heinz; Puin, Gerd-R (2010). The Hidden Origins of Islam: New Research into Its Early History. Amherst, New York: Prometheus Books. ISBN 978-1-59102-634-1.
- Peters, Rudolph Albert (2008). Jihad in classical and modern Islam: a reader. Princeton: Markus Wiener Publishers. ISBN 978-1-55876-359-3.
- Philips, Abu Ameenah Bilal (1990). Tafseer Soorah Al-Hujuraat. Riyadh: Tawheed Publications.
- Pickthall, M.M. (1981). The Glorious Qur'an. Chicago IL: Iqra' Book Center. p. vii.
- Rehman, Shaikh Fazlur; Shaikh, Fazlur Rehman (2001). Chronology of Prophetic Events. Ta-Ha. ISBN 978-1-84200-034-2.
- Reinach, Salomon (1909). Orpheus: A History of Religions.
- Reynolds, Gabriel Said (2008). "Introduction, Quranic studies and its controversies". The Quran in its Historical Context. Routledge.
- Reynolds, Gabriel (29 March 2012). New Perspectives on the Qur'an: The Qur'an in its Historical Context 2. Routledge. ISBN 978-1-136-70078-1.
- Reynolds, Gabriel Said (2017). The Qur'an and the Bible: Text and Commentary. Yale University Press. ISBN 978-0-300-18132-6.
- Reynolds, Gabriel Said (2 September 2025). Christianity and the Qur'an: The Rise of Islam in Christian Arabia. Yale University Press. ISBN 978-0-300-28606-9.
- Rippin, Andrew (1991). Muslims: Their Religious Beliefs and Practices. Vol. 1. London: Routledge. ISBN 978-0415045193.
- Rippin, Andrew (2008). "Syriac in the Quran". In Reynolds, Gabriel Said (ed.). The Quran in its Historical Context. London & New York: Routledge. p. 252. ISBN 978-0-415-42899-6.
- Robinson, Neal (1996). ""The Dynamics Of The Qur'ānic Discourse"". Sudden Changes In Person & Number: Neal Robinson On Iltifāt. SCM Press Ltd.
- Rodinson, Maxime (1974). "The Western Image and Western Studies of Islam". In Joseph Schach; C.E. Bosworth (eds.). The Legacy of Islam. Oxford University Press.
- Rodinson, Maxime (2002). Muhammad. London: Tauris Parke. ISBN 1-86064-827-4.
- Said, Edward (1978). Orientalism. Vintage.
- Šārôn, Moše (1986). Studies in Islamic History and Civilization: In Honour of Professor David Ayalon. BRILL. ISBN 978-965-264-014-7.
- Maududi, Sayyid Abul Ala (1967). The Meaning of the Quran.
- Schacht, Joseph (1950). The Origins of Muhammadan Jurisprudence. Clarendon Press.
- Schoenbaum, Thomas J.; Chiba, Shin (2008). Peace Movements and Pacifism After September 11. Edward Elgar Publishing. ISBN 978-1-84720-667-1.
- Shoemaker, Stephen J. (2021). A Prophet has Appeared: The Rise of Islam through Christian and Jewish Eyes: A Sourcebook. University of California Press. ISBN 9780520299603.
- Shoemaker, Stephen J. (2022). Creating the Qur'an: A Historical-Critical Study. University of California Press. ISBN 9780520389038.
- Sirry, Mun'im A. (2014). Scriptural Polemics: The Qur'an and Other Religions. Oxford University Press. ISBN 978-0-19-935936-3.
- Small, Keith E. (2011). Textual Criticism and Qur'an Manuscripts. Lexington Books. ISBN 9780739177532.
- Sozomen; Constantinople, Saint Photius I. (Patriarch of (1855). The Ecclesiastical History of Sozomen: Comprising a History of the Church from A.D. 324 to A.D. 440. Henry G. Bohn.
- Stowasser, Barbara Freyer (1994). Women in the Qur'an, Traditions, and Interpretation. OUP USA. ISBN 978-0-19-511148-4.
- Stroumsa, Sarah (1999). Freethinkers of medieval Islam: Ibn al-Rawāndī, Abū Bakr al-Rāzī and their Impact on Islamic Thought. Brill. p. 103. ISBN 9004113746.
- Syreeni, Kari (2016). Social Memory and Social Identity in the Study of Early Judaism and Early Christianity. Vandenhoeck & Ruprecht Gmbh & Co. ISBN 978-3525593752.
- Tardieu, Michel (2008). Manichaeism. University of Illinois Press. ISBN 978-0-252-03278-3.
- Tesei, Tommaso (19 October 2023). The Syriac Legend of Alexander's Gate. Oxford University Press. pp. 171–172. doi:10.1093/oso/9780197646878.001.0001. ISBN 978-0-19-764687-8. Archived from the original on 23 May 2024.
- Tolan, John (2013). "Part 1". Europe and the Islamic World: A History. Translated by Todd, Jane Marie. Princeton, NJ: Princeton University Press. ISBN 978-0-691-14705-5.
- Torrey, Charles Cutler (1933). The Jewish Foundation of Islam. The Hilda Stich Stroock Lectures. New York: Jewish Institute of Religion Press. pp. vii, 164. OCLC 1244859525.
- Tremblay, Rodrigue (2009). The Code for Global Ethics: Toward a Humanist Civilization. Trafford Publishing. ISBN 978-1-4269-1358-7.
- Trombley, Stephen (1999). The New Fontana Dictionary of Modern Thought. HarperCollins Publishers. ISBN 978-0-00-155871-7.
- Van Bladel, Kevin (2008). "The Alexander Legend in the Qur'an 18:83-102". In Reynolds, Gabriel Said (ed.). The Qurʼān in Its Historical Context. Routledge. Archived from the original on 13 February 2022.
- Van Bladel, Kevin (2009). "Hermes and the Ṣābians of Ḥarrān". The Arabic Hermes: From Pagan Sage to Prophet of Science. Oxford: Oxford University Press. pp. 64–118. doi:10.1093/acprof:oso/9780195376135.003.0003. ISBN 978-0-19-537613-5.
- Van Donzel, Emeri J.; Schmidt, Andrea Barbara (2010). Gog and Magog in Early Eastern Christian and Islamic Sources. Brill. ISBN 978-9004174160.
- Waines, David (1995). Introduction to Islam. Cambridge: Cambridge University Press. pp. 273–274. ISBN 0-521-42929-3.
- Wansbrough, John E. (1978). The Sectarian Milieu: Content and Composition of Islamic Salvation History. Oxford University Press. ISBN 978-0-19-713596-9.
- Warraq, Ibn (1995). Why I Am Not a Muslim (PDF). Prometheus Books.
- Warraq, Ibn (2000). "1. Studies on Muhammad and the Rise of Islam". In Ibn Warraq (ed.). The Quest for the Historical Muhammad. Prometheus. pp. 15–88.
- Warraq, Ibn (2002). Ibn Warraq (ed.). What the Koran Really Says: Language, Text & Commentary. Translated by Ibn Warraq. New York: Prometheus. ISBN 157392945X.
- Warraq, Ibn (31 August 2008). Which Koran?: Variants, Manuscripts, Linguistics. Globe Pequot Publishing. ISBN 978-1-59102-429-3.
- Watt, W. Montgomery (1953). "The Growth of Opposition". Muhammad at Mecca. Oxford University Press. p. 105.
- Watt, W. Montgomery (1961). "The Alleged Moral Failures". Muhammad: Prophet and Statesman. Oxford University Press. p. 332.
- Watt, W. Montgomery (1974). Muhammad: prophet and statesman. London, New York: Oxford University Press. ISBN 978-0-19-881078-0.
- Yeʼor, Bat (1985). "Preface by Jacque Ellul". The Dhimmi:Jews and Christians Under Islam. New Jersey: Associated University Presse. p. 27. ISBN 0-8386-3262-9.
- Yeʼor, Bat (2002). Islam and Dhimmitude: Where Civilizations Collide. Fairleigh Dickinson Univ Press. ISBN 978-0-8386-3942-9.
- Zunz, Olivier; Kahan, Alan S. (11 October 2002). The Tocqueville Reader: A Life in Letters and Politics. Wiley. ISBN 978-0-631-21546-2.

=== Journals ===
- Abdul-Rahim, Roslan (December 2017). "Demythologizing the Qur'an Rethinking Revelation Through Naskh al-Qur'an" (PDF). Global Journal Al-Thaqafah. 7 (2): 51–78. doi:10.7187/GJAT122017-2. ISSN 2232-0474.
- Ahmed, Shahab (1998). "Ibn Taymiyyah and the Satanic Verses". Studia Islamica. 87 (87). Maisonneuve & Larose. doi:10.2307/1595926. JSTOR 1595926.
- Buck, Christopher (July–October 1984). "The identity of the Ṣābiʼūn". Muslim World. LXXIV (3–4): 172+. doi:10.1111/j.1478-1913.1984.tb03453.x. ISSN 0027-4909.
- Bursi, Adam (2018). "Connecting the Dots: Diacritics Scribal Culture, and the Quran". Journal of the International Qur'anic Studies Association. 3: 111. doi:10.5913/jiqsa.3.2018.a005. hdl:1874/389663. JSTOR 10.5913/jiqsa.3.2018.a005. S2CID 216776083.
- Conrad, Lawrence (June 1987). "Abraha and Muhammad: Some Observations Apropos of Chronology and Literary topoi in the Early Arabic Historical Tradition". Bulletin of the School of Oriental and African Studies. 50 (2): 239. doi:10.1017/S0041977X00049016. S2CID 162350288.
- Dutton, Yasin (2000). "Red Dots, Green Dots, Yellow Dots and Blue: Some Reflections on the Vocalisation of Early Qur'anic Manuscripts (Part II)". Journal of Qur'anic Studies. 2 (1): 1–24. doi:10.3366/jqs.2000.2.1.1. JSTOR 25727969.
- Guessoum, Nidhal (June 2008). "The Qur'an, Science, and the (related) contempory Muslin Discourse". Zygon. 43 (2). doi:10.1111/j.1467-9744.2008.00925.x. ISSN 0591-2385.
- Haleem, Muhammad Abdel (1992). "Grammatical Shift for Rhetorical Purposes: Iltifāt and Related Features in the Qur'an". Bulletin of the School of Oriental and African Studies. 55 (3). Cambridge University Press: 407–432. doi:10.1017/S0041977X0000475X. JSTOR 620645.
- Jomier, Jacques (1954). "Quelques positions actuelles de l'exégèse coranique en Égypte révélées par une polémique récente (1947‒1951)". MIDÉO: Mélanges de l'Institut Dominicain d'Études Orientales du Caire (in French). 1. Cairo: Dar al-Maaref: 39‒72.
- Khan, Liaquat Ali (2008). "Jurodynamics of Islamic Law". Rutgers Law Review. 61 (2): 240–242.
- Lester, Toby (1 January 1999). "What Is the Koran?". The Atlantic.
- Lüling, Günter (1996). "Preconditions for the Scholarly Criticism of the Koran and Islam with Some Autobiographical Remarks". The Journal of Higher Criticism. 3 (1): 95–99.
- Manzoor, S. Parvez (1987). "Method Against Truth: Orientalism and Qur'anic Studies". Muslim World Book Review. 7 (4): 33–49.
- Melchert, Christopher (2008). "The Relation of the Ten Readings to One Another". Journal of Qur'anic Studies. 10 (2): 73–87. doi:10.3366/E1465359109000424. JSTOR 25728289.
- Nevo, Yehuda D. (1994). "Towards a Prehistory of Islam". Jerusalem Studies in Arabic and Islam. 17.
- Peters, F. E. (August 1991). "The Quest of the Historical Muhammad". International Journal of Middle East Studies. 23 (3). Cambridge University Press: 291–315. JSTOR 164601.
- Powers, David S. (September 1982). "On the Abrogation of the Bequest Verses". Arabica. 29 (3): 246–295. doi:10.1163/157005882X00301. JSTOR 4056186.
- Sadeghi, Behnam; Goudarzi, Mohsen (2012). "Ṣan'ā' 1 and the Origins of the Qur'ān". Der Islam. 87 (1–2). Berlin: De Gruyter: 1–129. doi:10.1515/islam-2011-0025. S2CID 164120434.
- Sardar, Ziaddin (21 August 2008). "Weird science". New Statesman.
- Serjeant, R. B. (1978). "Review of Quranic Studies: Sources and Methods of Scriptural Interpretation; Hagarism: The Making of the Islamic World". Journal of the Royal Asiatic Society of Great Britain and Ireland. 110 (1): 76–78. doi:10.1017/S0035869X00134264. ISSN 0035-869X. JSTOR 25210922.
- Tabatabaʾi, Mohammad Ali; Dad, Mehr; Mirsadri, Saida (2016). "The Qurʾānic Cosmology, as an Identity in Itself". Arabica. 63 (3/4). Brill: 201–234. ISSN 0570-5398. JSTOR 24811784.
- Tabataba'i, Mohammad Ali; Mirsadri, Saida (2016). "Qurʾānic Cosmography: A Survey of the Qurʾānic Conception of the Cosmos". Journal of Quranic Studies. 18 (1).
- Tardieu, Michel (1982). "Les manichéens en Égypte". Bulletin de la Société Française d'Égyptologie (94). ISSN 0037-9379.
- van Ess, Josef (8 September 1978). "The Making Of Islam". The Times Literary Supplement: 998.
- Wheeler, Brannon M. (1998). "Moses or Alexander? Early Islamic Exegesis of Qurʾān 18:60–65". Journal of Near Eastern Studies. 57 (3): 191–215.
