= The Syro-Aramaic Reading of the Koran =

2000 book by Christoph Luxenberg

- Author: Christoph Luxenberg (ps.)
- Original title: Die Syro-Aramäische Lesart des Koran: Ein Beitrag zur Entschlüsselung der Koransprache
- Language: German
- Subject: Quranic studies
- Genre: Non-fiction
- Publisher: Hans Schiler Publishers
- Publication date: 2000
- Publication place: Berlin
- English publication date: 1 May 2007
- Media type: Print (Hardcover)
- Pages: 352
- ISBN: 3-89930-088-2
- OCLC: 124038162
- Dewey Decimal: 297.1/22 22
- LC Class: PJ6696 .L8913 2007

The Syro-Aramaic Reading of the Koran: A Contribution to the Decoding of the Language of the Koran is a monograph of philology in Quranic studies published in 2000 under the pseudonym Christoph Luxenberg. The subject of the book is a new approach to identifying and solving textual and exegetical problems in the Quran, by deciphering its language.^{:8,15} It is considered unique in the history of Quran commentary,^{:178} bold in its claims and controversial for challenging the traditional history of the Quran.^{:8} There is some academic acceptance only of limited aspects of the book.

Two main theses can be distinguished.^{:71} The first is that the language of the Quran is not a clear variant of Arabic but a hybrid language of Arabic and Syriac, as well as other Aramaic dialects.^{:11} This not only touches on the special status of Arabic in Islam but would have major implications for the way the Quran is interpreted, because the earliest Quran manuscripts were written in rasm, a defective script, to which later interpreters added diacritics to clarify its meaning. Luxenberg argues they apparently lacked a reliable oral tradition for the Quran and mistakenly assumed its language conformed to the rules and lexicon of Classical Arabic, thus, imposing the wrong interpretation on the rasm. This has resulted in over 25% of the Quran being misunderstood, Luxenberg estimates, and would explain various ambiguities in traditional Islamic exegesis and what Western scholars consider the many "obscure" passages. (Note: Luxenberg 2007: "In spite of all these efforts one would not be far from the truth if one were to estimate the proportion of the Koran that is still considered unexplained today at about a quarter of the text. But the actual proportion is probably much higher insofar as it will be shown that a considerable number of passages that were thought to be certain have in reality been misunderstood, to say nothing of the imprecise rendering of numerous Koranic expressions" (p.108).) (Note: Gerd R. Puin: "The Koran claims for itself that it is 'mubeen,' or 'clear,' but if you look at it, you will notice that every fifth sentence or so simply doesn't make sense. Many Muslims—and Orientalists—will tell you otherwise, of course, but the fact is that a fifth of the Koranic text is just incomprehensible." Quoted in Lester 1999 Hopkins 2003: "It is common knowledge that the Qur'an is fraught with difficulties: philologists and theologians have been grappling with the textual problems of Muslim scripture ever since the Qur'an was committed to writing" (p. 377). Crone 2006: "the Qur'an is often highly obscure. Sometimes it uses expressions that were unknown even to the earliest exegetes, or words that do not seem to fit entirely, though they can be made to fit more or less; sometimes it seems to give us fragments detached from a long-lost context; and the style is highly allusive.") Luxenberg claims that these can now be clarified when they are back-translated and interpreted as Syriacisms. While there is scholarly consensus Arabic was influenced by Syriac, since the latter used to be the lingua franca of the Ancient Near East, Luxenberg's thesis goes beyond the mainstream scholarly consensus in Quranic studies. Luxenberg even posits that much of Classical Arabic is also "of Aramaic derivation" which has been overlooked due to the historical-linguistic assumption that Arabic is closer to a proto-Semitic language than Aramaic is.^{:12} (Note: "Semiticists long believed classical Arabic, in large part due to its robust system of inflections and broad sound system, to be an ancient language, probably the closest language to Ur-Semitic. Indeed, it was this belief, in part, that led to the rise of Arabic Studies in Europe, for it was thought that Arabic preserved ancient Semitic characteristics that could explain certain riddles in Biblical Hebrew and Aramaic. Accordingly, most scholars in the nineteenth century, informed by the model of Latin and Romance languages, held that modern Arabic colloquials were neither ancient nor independent (as French, Spanish and so on are not independent of Latin), but something like mischievous children of pure classical Arabic. The Qur'an, on the other hand, was generally thought to preserve this classical language."^{:12})

The second main thesis is that the word "quran" is derived from a Syriac word that originally meant lectionary (Note: Luxenberg 2007: "As an ecclesiastical terminus technicus (technical term), the Koran thus corresponds originally to the lectionarium (lectionary) still used in Western Christianity today as a liturgical book containing excerpts from scripture to be read aloud during the service" (p. 71).) and that the Quran describes itself along those lines, that is, not as self-referential but as referencing a canon of scripture (Note: Luxenberg 2007: "With these two terms the Koran defines the origin of its content. It therefore consists, on the one hand, of 'faithful' (or well-known) excerpts from the 'Proto-Scripture,' i.e. the 'canonical Scriptures,' and, on the other hand, of parts taken, say, from apocryphal or other scriptures 'comparable' to the Proto-Scripture. The content of the Koran we have before us also confirms this brief "table of contents.' With comparable verses, the Koran is at the same time making it clear that for it the standard to which it persistently refers is the 'Proto-Scripture,' i.e. the Scriptures considered to be canonical" (p. 108).) which it, furthermore, makes accessible in Arabic, (Note: Luxenberg 2007: "Thus, when the Koran emphasizes in ten passages that it has been composed in the Arabic language, it does so to stress the particularity that differentiates it from the Proto-Scripture of the Old and the New Testaments, which had been composed in a foreign language" (p. 109) and "because the Scriptures are written in a foreign language, a translation into Arabic is necessary" (p. 123).) sees itself as being part of, (Note: Luxenberg 2007: "The reference to the Scriptures, however, is not only apparent from the individual allusions; rather, in more than one passage the Koran refers explicitly to the Scriptures, of which it conceives itself to be a part" (p. 104).) and affirms as the standard of comparison for being also considered revealed. (Note: Luxenberg 2007: "The Koran takes as its starting point the axiom that the Scripture preceding it (the Old and New Testament) has been revealed. Understanding itself as a component of this Scripture, to be consistent it derives from this the claim that it itself has been revealed. In this regard, it emphasizes in no small number of passages, again and again, that it 'confirms'... the Scripture" (p. 249).) This runs counter to the traditional Islamic view of the Bible as so corrupt (tahrif) that it was substituted by the Quran. Whereas commentators customarily referenced pre-Islamic Arabic poetry to clarify Quranic passages, scripture should thus be referenced instead. Furthermore, Luxenberg identifies Syriac Christianity - which uses Syriac as its liturgical language and in which liturgy many pre-Islamic Christian Arabs participated (Note: Quilty: "Luxenberg's premise is that the Aramaic language—the lingua franca of the Prophet Mohammed, the language of culture and Christian liturgy—had a profound influence on the Koran.")^{:254} - as the main source of scriptural and cultural reference for the Quran. Finally, the earliest Quran suras of the first Meccan period, which are considered to have mysterious and puzzling language and represent about 7% of the content of the Quran, (Note: Sinai 2017: "although the first Meccan period comprises nearly half of all surahs (forty-eight out of 114), these are so short that they make up only about 7 per cent of the entire corpus in terms of word count.") are seen by Luxenberg as having a pre-Quranic or pre-Islamic origin as Christian Syriac liturgical texts. (Note: Luxenberg 2007: "[Sura 108] is without a doubt pre-Koranic. As such it is a part of that matrix out of which the Koran was originally constituted as a Christian liturgical book (Qerya-na), and which as a whole has been designated in Western Koran studies as the "first Meccan period." (p. 301) and "[Sura 96] is, in any case, part of that nucleus of the Koran, the Christian Syrian origins of which cannot be ignored. . . . Arguing in favor of its being very probably pre-Koranic, i.e., much more pre-Islamic, is its language, hitherto perceived as mysterious and puzzling. For it is precisely this language with its unadulterated expressions that reveals to us its venerable origins." (p. 323).)

Luxenberg also suggests that, as the dominant written and literary language, Syriac influenced the development of written Arabic and, in particular, the Quran as the first written Arabic literature.^{:9-11} Most prominently, Luxenberg posits that the Quran was - at least in part - initially written in Garshuni, that is, in the Arabic language using Syriac letters before being transcribed into Arabic letters.^{:49}^{:549} This would account for certain transcription errors, more evidence for which Luxenberg put forth in the 2007 article "Relics of Syro-Aramaic Letters in Early Qurʾānic Codices of the ḥiǧāzī and kūfī Style". Garshuni is a technique otherwise first attested only in the 12th century^{:303} and, if true, would alter the story of redaction in the Quran's early history. Furthermore, as this transcription has resulted even in the misreading of genuine Arabic expressions,^{:27} Luxenberg concludes again that the original transmission of the Quran must have been in written form or, at the least, that severe gaps occurred in its early oral transmission.^{:40-1} With a reliable oral transmission being central to the traditional Islamic narrative, The Syro-Aramaic Reading of the Koran fits into the revisionist school of Islamic studies.^{:8} Luxenberg uses these insights (i.e. a hybrid-language, referencing scripture, Syriac Christian influence, transcription errors and written transmission) to emend and/or reinterpret dozens of Quran verses, two suras and some thematic content, and considers his success in doing so as warranting a completely new reading of the Quran.

The book received considerable attention from the popular press in North America and Europe at its release, perhaps in large part due to its argument that the Quranic term Houri refers not to 'virgins' in Islamic paradise, but to 'grapes'.^{:16} Its publication "sparked heated debates among specialists of Islamic and Semitic studies, and received numerous reviews ranging from overly-laudative to blatantly hostile". The influence of the book - especially the efforts to refute it - was so great that it marked "a watershed moment" in Western Quran studies and provoked intense study of the Syriac language, text of the Quran, Arabic script, pre-Islamic inscriptions in Arabia, early Islamic history and the Quran's relationship with Christianity.

Intended as the first installment in a series,^{:377}^{:165} a dozen articles and dozens of videos were subsequently published under the same pseudonym.^{:23}^{:380-1} A future publication promised to treat the morphology, lexicon and syntax of the "Aramaic basic structure" of the Quran's language^{:12} has not materialised as of mid-2026.

== Comparison with prior works of others ==
The book's premise is "no more revolutionary" than earlier work by Günter Lüling, John Wansbrough, Patricia Crone or Michael Cook. Furthermore, there is much overlap between Luxenberg's ideas and earlier work of other scholars, such as Lüling. However, whereas Luxenberg considers about 7% of the Quran (the first Meccan sura's) as having a pre-Quranic Christian Syriac origin, Lüling argued that "about one-third of the Qurʾān is based on ancient Christian Arabic hymns" which were reworked by the Quran's editors after the prophet's death,^{:363} and which encompass the vast majority of the older, shorter rhythmic Suras as well as hymnic fragments within the longer Medinan Suras. Lülling has been criticised by Neuwirth and Sinai for not discovering the 33% figure in the Quran text itself but - while ignoring the internal liturgical logic of the Arabic saj' - changing diacritics through circular philology until a strophic hymn appeared. Furthermore:

Luxenberg holds a minority position when suggesting that a cursive Syriac script rather than Nabataean script served as the basis for Arabic script. Depicted is the Classical Syriac Estrangelā alphabet.

"Whereas Lüling argues that the genesis of the Qur'an occurred much earlier than is usually thought, with a heretofore unknown "Ur-Qur'an," Wansbrough and Nevo argue that this genesis occurred much later, with the collection of prophetical logia under the Abbasids. [...] Luxenberg, like Lüling, turns to the text of the Qur'an and finds indications of earlier Christian writings. Unlike Lüling's, however, Luxenberg's reading of the text is not done in the shadow of a grand religious vision. His reading is also more controlled. If Lüling aims for a reformation of Islam, Luxenberg aims for an Entschlüsselung, a "decipherment," of the Qur'anic language. [...] If Luxenberg's method is at all affected by a religious vision, it is simply the conviction that Syriac Christianity was important to the development of the Qur'an. This is hardly unprecedented, as Alphonse Mingana, Arthur Jeffery and Tor Andræ were all of the same opinion."^{:15}

This link between the Quran and Syriac Christianity was previously also studied by Wilhelm Rudolph, Richard Bell, Karl Ahrens, Joseph Henninger and Erwin Gräf.^{:12} Especially Alphonse Mingana devoted attention to identifying Aramaic/Syriac loanwords and argued for Syriac influence on the style of the Quran and Josef Horovitz studied how "most proper names of Biblical figures in the Quran follow the Syriac form". Christoph Luxenberg's work is distinguished by the theory that the Quran was written in an Aramaic-Arabic hybrid language.^{:12-13} Furthermore, that there was no reliable oral transmission accompanying an initial written transmission, that the text was misinterpreted and distorted when later Arabs read the defective script as pure Arabic and, finally, that "Syriac lexicography holds the key to deciphering the Quran".^{:52-53} However, broadly speaking:

"It is important to remember that by no means are Christoph Luxenberg or even Alphonse Mingana the first people to contemplate the presence of Syriac in the Qur’an. Starting in the early centuries of Islam, Muslim exegetes frequently discussed various words which they considered to be of Syriac origin. Early Muslim writers were apparently aware of a language either still spoken in their midst or evident in texts called suryani or nabati – and they appear to have appealed to that knowledge to solve exegetical problems in the Qur’an. The basic thrust is the same as the one for Luxenberg and Mingana: if the text is problematic, then perhaps Syriac can solve the issue. Medieval Muslims took a similar basic approach."^{:249}

There are also parallels between Luxenberg's approach and that of (CRC member) Bruno Bonnet-Eymard who, in collaboration with Hebrew specialist Kurt Hruby, also worked on a Quran translation that modified diacritical marks and considered possible translations until arriving at one satisfactory from a Biblical perspective. It was considered as lacking expertise in Arabic and Islamology by Gilliot but neveretheless as a valuable and relevant contribution by Grodzk, Aldeeb and Lafontaine who, in comparison, considered Luxenberg "more serious ... though sometimes falling in the same trap as Bruno". (Note: Lafontaine: "Je vous recommande davantage le travail de Christoph Luxenberg, plus sérieux, même s’il tombe lui aussi parfois dans le même écueil que le frère Bruno.")

== Outline of the book ==
Chapters 1-6 as well as chapters 8 and 9 provide a brief and very general introduction, including a description of the ‘working method’ in chapter 3. Chapter 7 discusses the importance of the imāla and of orthography which is used in chapter 10 to analyse key Quranic words. Chapters 12 through 14 use the method described in chapter 3 to suggest emendations to "a series of (mostly) unconnected" individual Quran verses. Chapters 15 through 17 treat broader themes such as the virgins of Paradise and a re-reading of Suras 108 and 96.^{:45} The final chapter 18 sketches a historical-cultural framework to explain a Christian lectionary origin for the Quran.^{:69} Theory, methodology and application are treated as much as possible separately below.

== Theory & thesis ==
=== The prevalence of Syriac and Christianity ===
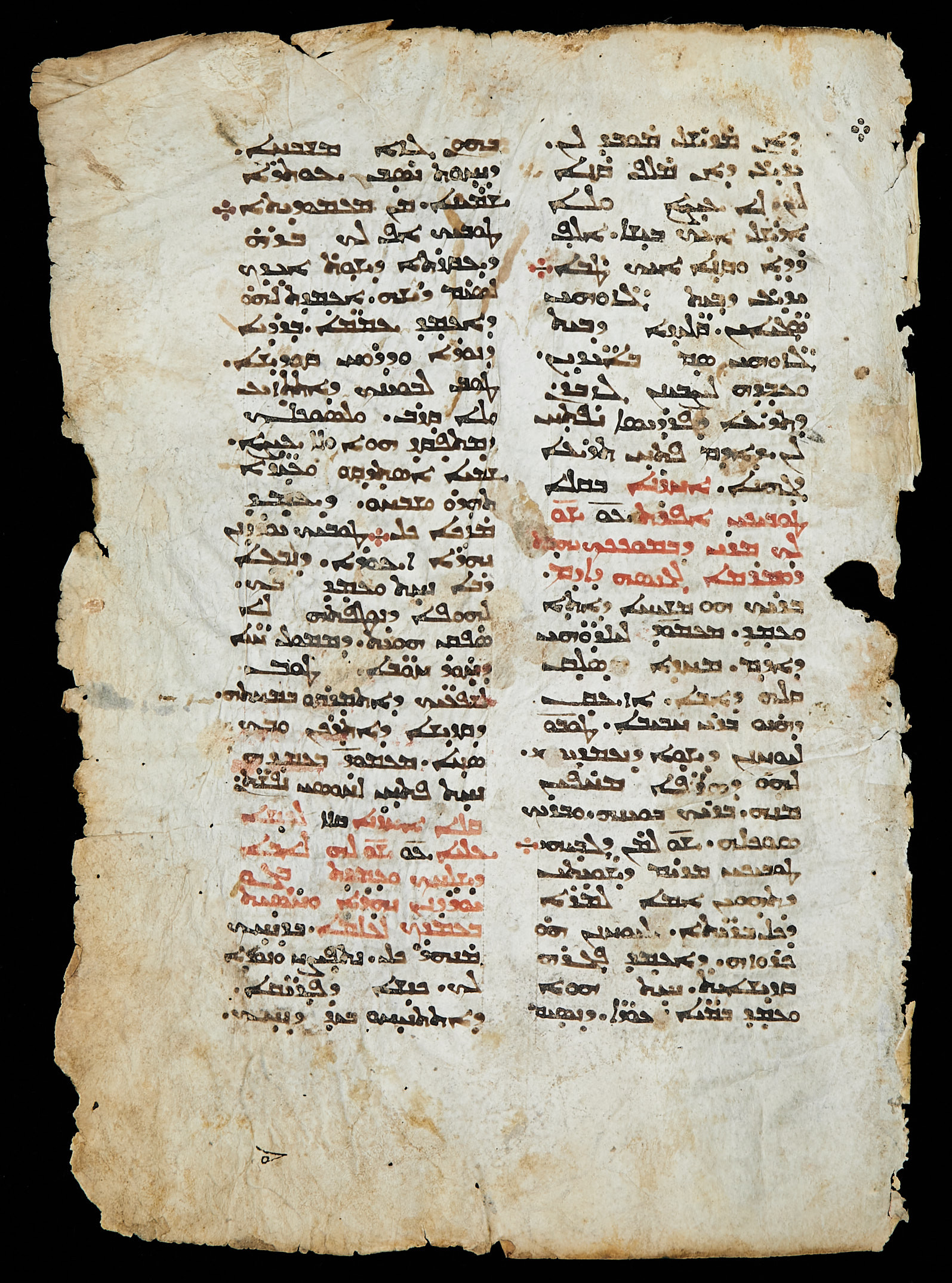
A Syriac Christian liturgical manuscript (11th century) in the Classical Syriac Estrangela script.

In the foreword, the importance of Syriac as a written language for the Arabs and the Quran is described. Arabic was not used as a written language at the time of the Islamic prophet Muhammad whereas Syriac (which, Luxenberg terms "Syro-Aramaic"^{:9} together with other Aramaic dialects^{:11}) was the language of choice for written communication in the entire Near East from the 2nd to the 7th centuries CE. Syriac originated as the Aramaic dialect used in the ancient city Edessa which subsequently became the vehicle through which Christianity and culture spread throughout Asia up to Malabar in India and eastern China. Syriac was used for culture and communication by Arameans, Arabs and somewhat by Persians and rich literature was produced in this language (such as by Aphrahat and Ephraem) from the 4th century until it was replaced by Arabic in the 7th and 8th centuries. One important addition here is that the Syriac literature and culture in which it was embedded was almost exclusively Christian. Furthermore, many Arabs were Christianised and participated in the Syriac Christian liturgy.

Ultimately, Luxenberg conceives of testing the following hypothesis: if Syriac was the written language of the Arabs and informed the cultural matrix of the Near East, to what extent has it influenced those who developed written Arabic? Luxenberg also refers here to an early hadith in which Muhammed instructs his secretary Zayd ibn Thabit to learn Syriac (and Hebrew).^{:165-6}

=== The Quran's importance in the development of written Arabic ===
In Chapter 1, the traditional Islamic narrative about the early transmission of the Quran is presented as follows. There was an oral authorship of the Quran by Muhammad in the Arabic language between ca. 612 and 632, which was first completely brought together in a written form in the Uthmanic codex in the mid-7th century. As the first book in the Arabic language, the Quran is important to the formation of written Arabic. For Arabic literature to develop after the Quran's appearance, centuries were required, Luxenberg states:^{:166}^{:13}

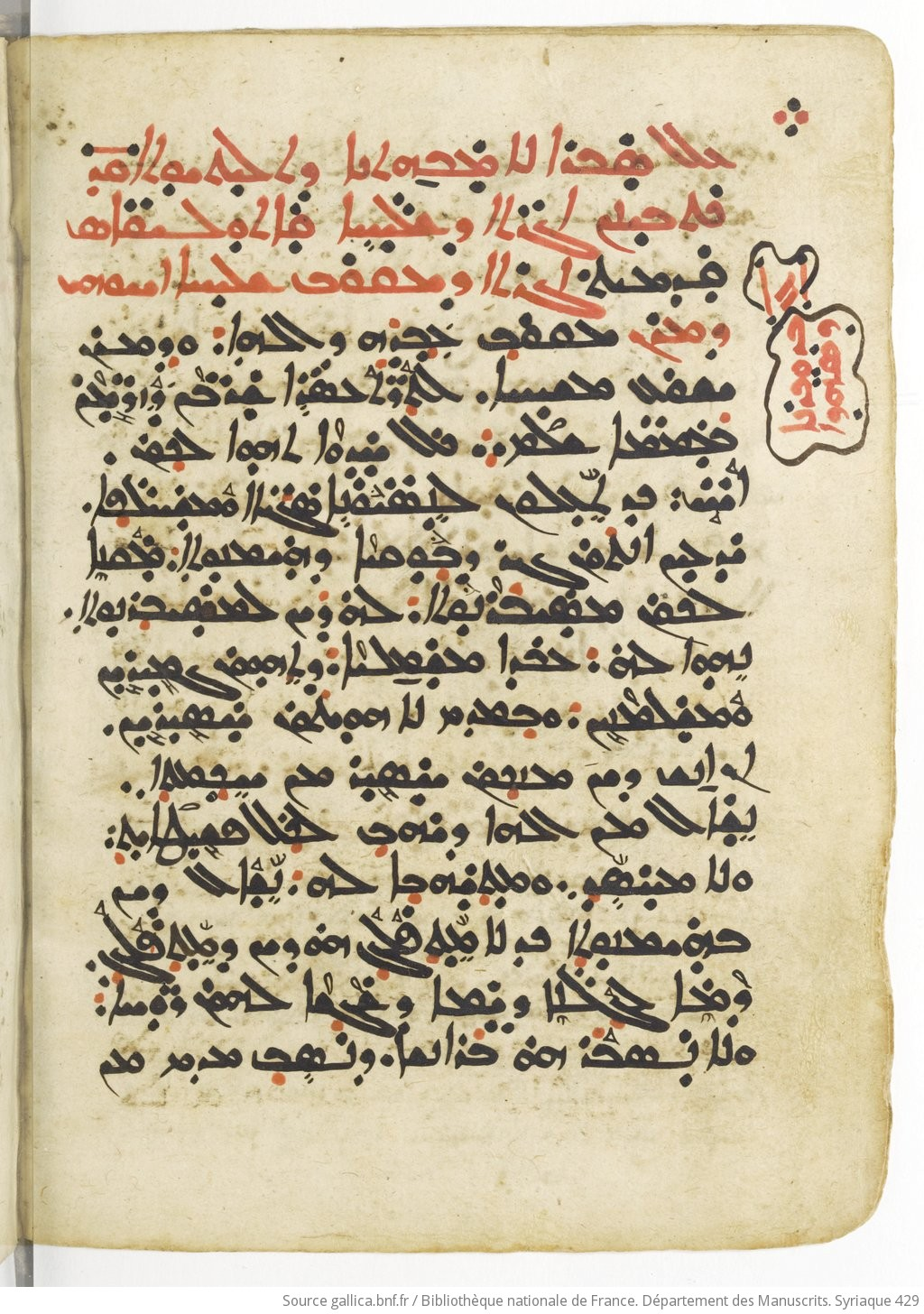
A New Testament manuscript (16th century) in the Western Syriac Serto script. The cursive Serto became formalised in the 8th century. Luxenberg implies that a precursor to Serto (presumably in between Serto and Classical Estrangela) served as the basis for Arabic script.

the first examples of Arabic literature in the full sense of the phrase are found only two centuries later, at the time of the 'Biography of the Prophet' . . .as written by Ibn Hisham, who died in 828. We may thus establish that post-Koranic Arabic literature developed by degrees, in the period following the work of al-Khalil bin Ahmad, who died in 786, the founder of Arabic lexicography (kitab al-'ayn), and of Sibawayh, who died in 796, to whom the grammar of Classical Arabic is due.

Luxenberg then briefly describes important findings from Western Quranic studies. Theodor Nöldeke (co-)wrote the standard work Geschichte des Qorāns and disagreed with Karl Vollers as to the dialect of Quranic Arabic being either Classical Arabic or Old Hejazi Arabic. (Note: Recent scholarship has ruled in favor of Hejazi origins: "This work ... demonstrates that the text was composed in the Hijazi vernacular dialect, and that in the centuries that followed different reciters started to classicize the text to a new linguistic ideal, the ideal of the ʿarabiyyah".) Siegmund Fraenkel, Alphonse Mingana and Arthur Jeffery increasingly singled out Aramaic dialects as being influential to the Quran's language. Abraham Geiger and Heinrich Speyer identified Biblical and Christian and Jewish apocryphic and literary influences. Jakob Barth and Günter Lüling elucidated passages by changing diacritical dots. Ignác Goldziher discussed controversial readings and uncertainties in Quran exegesis. Finally, Josef Horovitz analysed selected Quranic terms and names. However, the significance of the insights of especially Syriac influence have not been investigated with a scientific approach.^{:166-7}^{:13-19}

=== A new approach ===
In Chapter 2, Luxenberg states that his theories developed independently of the works of Arabian as well as Western scholarship, relying instead on Arabic and Syriac lexical tools as well as comparative Semitic linguistics.^{:167} Luxenberg claims that following scholarly tradition would have undermined the development of this method.^{:20} The initial process used instead is described by Luxenberg in an interview:

At first I conducted a ´synchronous´ reading. In other words, I kept in mind both Arabic and Aramaic. Thanks to this procedure, I was able to discover the extent of the previously unsuspected influence of Aramaic upon the language of the Koran: in point of fact, much of what now passes under the name of ´Classical Arabic´ is of Aramaic derivation.

=== Development of Arabic script ===
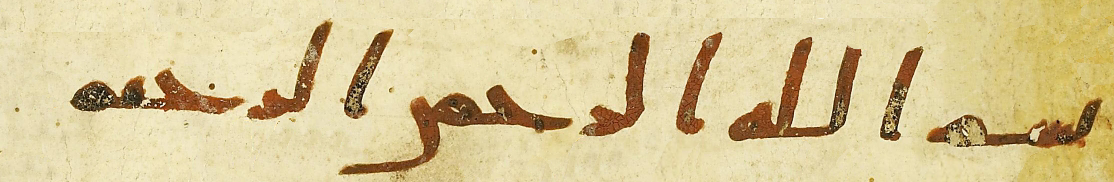
The basmala as rasm in the Birmingham manuscript, one of the oldest surviving copies of the Quran.

Rasm (black), consonant diacritics (red) and short vowels diacritics (blue) - the latter is used in the Quran but not in most written Arabic.

In Chapter 4, the development of Arabic script is discussed and why this development is relevant to understand the language of the Quran.^{:169} Except for some early Arabic inscriptions, the Quran is considered the first book ever written in Arabic script. Luxenberg suggests that a cursive Syriac script served as the model for the Arabic script.^{:30} Furthermore, the limited versatility of the Quranic Arabic script seems to indicate that the text originally served as a mnemonic device or shorthand for recitors.^{:169} This limited and early form of the Arabic script is called rasm, a defective script as it lacks Arabic diacritics to indicate vowels and distinguish most consonants. (Note: "Modern historians assert that the earliest manuscripts of the Qur'an were written in an Arabic scriptio defectiva, devoid of orthographic aids such as consonantal diacritics and vowel markers. In fact, the earliest extant manuscripts—those in the Hijazi script, dated to the first/seventh century—do exhibit consonantal diacritics, though only sporadically and insufficiently to create a completely unambiguous text".) Luxenberg argues that mistakes could have been made when commentators added diacritics to the rasm.^{:169}

=== Early transmission of the Quran ===
In Chapter 5, two contradicting oral traditions about the transmission of the Quran are presented. First, an uninterrupted chain of "readers" (qurra) starting with Muhammad's contemporaries such as Ibn Abbas and later Anas ibn Malik. Second, Quranic "leaves" kept by Muhammad's widow Hafsa that were used to standardise Uthman's codex. Furthermore, Islamic tradition is unclear when the diacritics were fixed, while Régis Blachère estimates this process took over 300 years. A major difficulty in tracing the early development of the Quran is that Uthman destroyed all manuscripts with differing reading variants and differing consonantal texts other than his own edition.^{:169}

=== Reading traditions ===
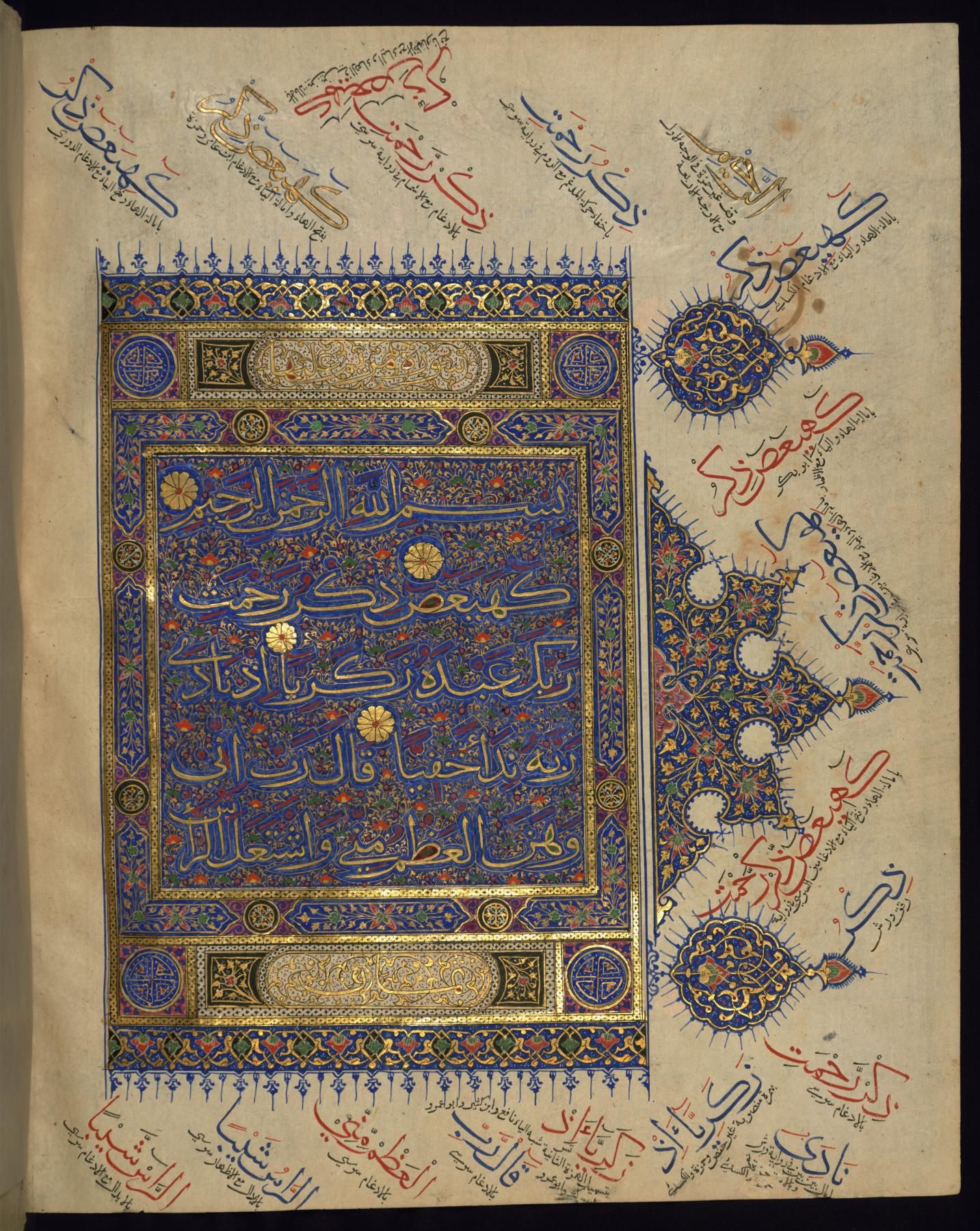
A 15th-century Quranic manuscript featuring marginal notes that provide different readings according to different Qira'ats and explanations of various phrases and words.

In Chapter 6, Islamic traditions are presented in which Muhammad "sanctioned any reading of the text that did not blatantly change a curse into a blessing or vice-versa". This tradition must reflect recollections of the ambiguity of the Arabic rasm.^{:169}

In Chapter 7, Luxenberg relates how Tabari in his monumental Quran commentary takes for granted the diacritical placement around the text as it had become fixed by the 10th century. But, Luxenberg asks, "when and according to what criteria or according to what tradition these points were introduced, and to what extent the originators disposed of the necessary philological and [Biblical] theological competence, for such questions the historical critique of Tabari, though he was considered a scholar in his day, do not seem to have been adequate."^{:37}

Luxenberg argues there is much uncertainty even surrounding the number of vowels in early Arabic, such as Pre-Islamic Arabic poetry, quoting Theodor Nöldeke: "We don't even have the right to assume that in Proto-Semitic there were always only three dynamically distinct vowels or vocal spheres."^{:39} Luxenberg accordingly proposes a philological interpretation for the existence of the Quranic reading traditions. Thus, the tradition of seven reading (sab'at aḥruf) mentioned by Tabari are related by Luxenberg to the seven vowel signs used in the East Syriac writing system Estrangeli (using dots). Whereas the tradition of five readings (hamsat aḥruf) is related to the five vowel signs used in the West Syriac writing system Serto (using small Greek letters).^{:169} Thus, it is important to ask the question "whether it was not arbitrary that the post-Koranic Classical Arabic system of vowels was fixed at the three basic vowels a, u, i (for short and long)."^{:39}

=== Western Quran studies ===
In Chapter 8 it is related how even the best modern Quran translations in Western academia - referenced throughout the book are Rudi Paret, Richard Bell and Régis Blachère - reach limits in meeting the problems of Quran interpretation earlier outlined by August Fischer:

- Many words and phrases are obscure and ambiguous.
- Many allusions made in the Quran are hard to interpret.
- Suras are not ordered systemically.
- There is no critical edition of the Quran (with fixed diacritics).^{:66-7}

Furthermore, Arab commentaries sometimes provide up to a dozen contradictory interpretations of obscure passages.^{:170} Room for improvement is especially possible through philological investigations.^{:67}

=== Mystery of the Quran's language ===
In Chapter 9, Among specialists, no doubt exists that the language of the Quran is Arabic, something the Quran itself also attests. As no standardised written Arabic existed, this language is assumed to have been the Qurayshi dialect of Mecca. Surprisingly enough, Tabari relates that Muhammad was "unable to explain this language to his contemporaries". As nobody afterwards succeeded in penetrating the "final mystery" of the Quran's language, Islamic tradition has it that the Quran's language is "of heavenly origin and thus finally unfathomable for mortals". Philology might provide an answer.^{:68-9}^{:170-1}

== Syro-Aramaic methodology ==
Chapter 3 introduces a working method (systematically applied in chapters 12 through 14) to identify and emend individual verses from the Quran. These verses are part of what Luxenberg estimates at about 25% of the content of the Quran that is deemed obscure (meaning difficult to interpret) by Western Quran studies. (Note: Gerd R. Puin: "The Koran claims for itself that it is 'mubeen,' or 'clear,' but if you look at it, you will notice that every fifth sentence or so simply doesn't make sense. Many Muslims—and Orientalists—will tell you otherwise, of course, but the fact is that a fifth of the Koranic text is just incomprehensible." Quoted in Lester 1999.)^{:377}^{:5} In other parts of the book verses are analysed that are deemed not obscure but misinterpreted.^{:377}^{:22}

Luxenberg has been criticised for only using modern Syriac lexicons i.e. Payne Smith's Thesaurus Syriacus (1879–1901), J.E. Manna’s Vocabulaire Chaldéen-Arabe (1900) and Brockelmann's Lexicon Syriacum (1928).^{:16}

1. Check whether a plausible, overlooked explanation can be found in Al-Tabari's Tafsīr (completed c. 883 CE). If not, then:
2. Check if there is a plausible explanation in the Ibn Manzur's Lisān al-ʿArab (completed c. 1290 CE), the most extensive Arabic dictionary (this dictionary postdates the Al-Tabari commentary by about 400 years, so might plausibly contain advances in lexical insight). If not, then:
3. Check if the Arabic expression has a homonymous (etymologically related) root in Syriac or Aramaic lexica with a different meaning that fits the context. If not, then:
4. Experiment with placements of the diacritics different from the default 1924 Cairo edition of the Quran but maintaining the consonantal rasm, to render Arabic words that make better sense. If not, then:
5. Change the diacritics to look for Syriac roots and expressions. If not, then:
6. Translate the Arabic phrase into Syriac and check the Syrian literature for a phrase that might have been translated literally into Arabic (morphological calques). If not, then:
7. Check to see if there is a corresponding phrase in the old Syrian literature (East Syrian lexical tradition), which may be an analog of an Arabic phrase now lost. If not, then:
8. Check to see if it is a correct Arabic expression in the Arabic language but phonetically produced in the Syriac script (Garshuni) before being transcribed into the Arabic script. ^{:51}

"Plausibility", "judging" and "making sense" of single word involves looking at occurrences of the same word in more obvious Quranic passages, and looking at Aramaic apocryphal and liturgical texts, which were carried over almost verbatim into the Quran.

== Philological & linguistic findings ==
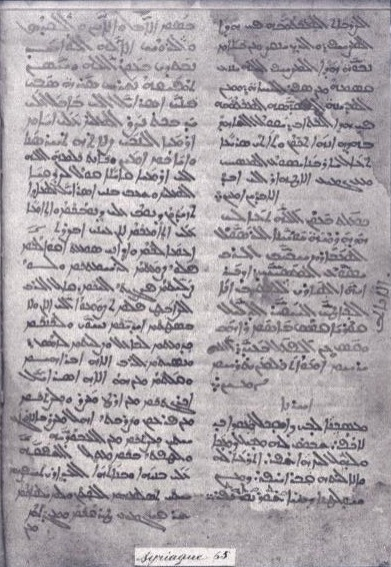
An example of Garshuni: a 16th-century Arabic-language manuscript written in the Western Syriac Serto script. Luxenberg suggests the Quran was initially written in a similar fashion.^{:84}

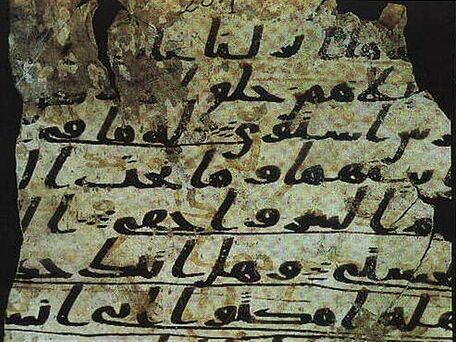
A fragment from the Sanaa manuscript, one of the oldest surviving Quran manuscripts. The absence of diacritics leaves room for ambiguity.

=== Garshuni transcription errors ===
Luxenberg posits that the Quran was originally written in Garshuni on the basis of certain mistakes made when this was transcribed into the Arabic script.^{:49}

In Chapter 10, Luxenberg argues that confusing the Arabic د (d) with ر (r) has not been well explained as they are clearly distinguishable in the early Arabic Hijazi and Kufic scripts. More likely is a mix-up between these letters if they are mistranscribed from the more easily confused Syriac letters ܕ (d) and ܪ (r) (only distinguished with a dot). Similarly, this also explains how final d, when mistranscribed as final r, could sometimes be mistaken for final "m".^{:83-84} In Chapter 13, examples are provided of mistranscribed letters even in the earliest Quran manuscripts. A common mistake is confusing the Syriac letters ܕ and ܪ as well as the Arabic و letter.^{:239-241}^{:63}

=== Ambiguity in Arabic rasm ===
In Chapter 4, Luxenberg argues that as only six consonants were rendered unambiguous in the Quranic Arabic, various mistakes could have been made when commentators later added diacritics amongst others on the basis of Classical Arabic vocabulary and grammar, obscuring original Syro-Aramaic readings. Categories include: identical rasm (e.g. ب b / ت t / ث th), optical similarity (e.g. confusing د d / ذ ḍ with ر r / ز z), as well as phonetic similarity (س s h / ح ḥ) and mistaking the guttoral for the hamza (ع / ء). Reversing these mispointings recovers the underlying Syriac forms.^{:29-44}

=== An orthographic procedure ===
Theodor Nöldeke suggested that the word "quran" has a Syriac origin in qeryānā ("reading aloud", "reading matter") and presumably assimilated "to the type fuʿlān" into the modern form qurʾān. Luxenberg reasons that understanding how this transformation took place orthographically provides the key to understanding the Quran's language. For this, Luxenberg builds mostly on the work of Werner Diem who noted that in the defective Quranic rasm, which lacked vowels, the letter y was occasionally used as mater lectionis for both long vowels ī and ā. (Note: Exclusive for secondary ā in a final position for tertiae yā roots before suffixes.) Luxenberg proposes that interpreters of the Quran sometimes made mistakes and, for example, interpreted an ī instead of ā. Furthermore, as the undotted tooth (ـٮـ) in the Quranic rasm could represent five consonants (b, t, th, n, y), later differentiated with dotting (ـبــتـثــنــيـ), any letter derived from an undotted tooth might potentially represent ā.^{:37}^{:48-50}^{:70-71} (Note: This applies to initial and media positions. In final position the Y has a different shape (ى) that can be distinguished from the undotted tooth.)

Luxenberg' theory of the orthographic transformation from the Syriac qeryā-nā to the Arabic qurʾān. Step 2 represents Luxenberg's proposed orthographical procedure for Syriacisms (Ch 10)

Luxenberg illustrates these mechanisms and potential confusion in seven examples, one of which is restoring the Arabic pronunciation for Abraham (Ibrāhīm) to the way it is pronounced in all other Semitic languages (Abrāhām).^{:37} For this Luxenberg uses the defective spelling ابرهم (Abrhm) occurring 15 times in the Quran which faithfully corresponds to the Hebrew (אברהם) and Syriac (ܐܒܪܗܡ), whereas an editor must have added the small peak to the 54 times occurring ابر هيم to emphasise the final vowel (Abrahám).^{:93}^{:122} Furthermore, the orthograpic procedure is crucially used by Luxenberg as one of several steps in a theory to explain how the Syriac qeryānā transformed into the modern qurʾān (see graph).^{:48-50}^{:70-74}

These "anomalous spellings, in which ā is represented orthographically by any tooth . . . should not (as in Nöldeke) be treated as examples of 'imāla, but as an orthographic method of reproducing ā in the early stages of Qur’ānic writing, which was forgotten by the later stages when oral tradition had been left behind".^{:50} This theory "presupposes a period in which the Qur’ānic text was preserved only in a written form, the pronunciation largely forgotten, and then a later period of Islamising exegesis."^{:50}

=== A phonological procedure for Syriacisms ===
In Chapter 7, various proposals of phonological Syriacisms are presented. Some imply that the Quran was (at a time) transmitted only in written form.^{:46}

Luxenberg argues that, because of the process of imala, words in Classical Arabic that end phonetically with the sound ē (orthographically written as final ﻯ , ﺍ or ﻩ with/without dots) may reflect the sound ē of the Syriac emphatic masculine plural.^{:46} Luxenberg uses this e.g. to explain the irregular use of "singular accusative nouns after the numbers 12-99", which should instead be understood as Syriac emphatic plurals.^{:48}

Luxenberg also argues that frequent use of ﺕ rather than ﺓ (in the construct state of feminine nouns) is another orthographic Syriacism. Thus, Luxenberg speculates that in the Syriac "Garden of Eden" (ܓܢܬ ܥܕܢ , feminine singular noun) the feminine ending ܬ (t) was represented in Arabic with the letter ﺕ (tāʾ), rather than standard Arabic ending ﺓ (tāʾ marbūṭa). Later Arabic readers misinterpreted this as a plural, rendering it "Gardens of Eden".^{:47}

Luxenberg also explains "anomalous feminines" (nouns) where the Syriac (ܐ) was originally used as mater lectionis (a consonant used to indicate a vowel, before vowels had their own letters) for Syriac emphatic (i.e. definite) forms, was subsequently transcribed into the Arabic ﻩ , but was then misunderstood, received a point ( ﺓ ) and was turned into the ta' marbuta. Luxenberg uses this e.g. to explain the Quranic forms of the names for Jesus and Moses.^{:47}

=== Waw of Apodosis ===
Part of Chapter 12 deals with the theory that in certain instances, the Arabic "wa-" (ﻭ) should not be pronounced (or translated) but is a direct borrowing (calque) denoting the Syriac "w-" (ܘ) which served to denote the start of an apodosis.^{:55} Luxenberg comments: "lt appears, if only sporadically, to have slipped into Syro-Aramaic as a Hebraism via the translation of the Bible. In most cases, however, it is left out in the Psitta. The same applies for the Koran.":^{155}

=== Grammar ===
In Chapter 13, Luxenberg introduced the idea of Syriac grammar having influenced the basic grammatical structure of the language of the Quran, based on unusual word order (Sura 19:23), apparent masculine endings in Arabic referring to feminine subjects (also Sura 19:23) and various borrowing patterns of endings and Eastern Syriac dialect vowel-shifts.^{:61-4}

== Emendations and reinterpretations ==
=== Quran as lectionary ===
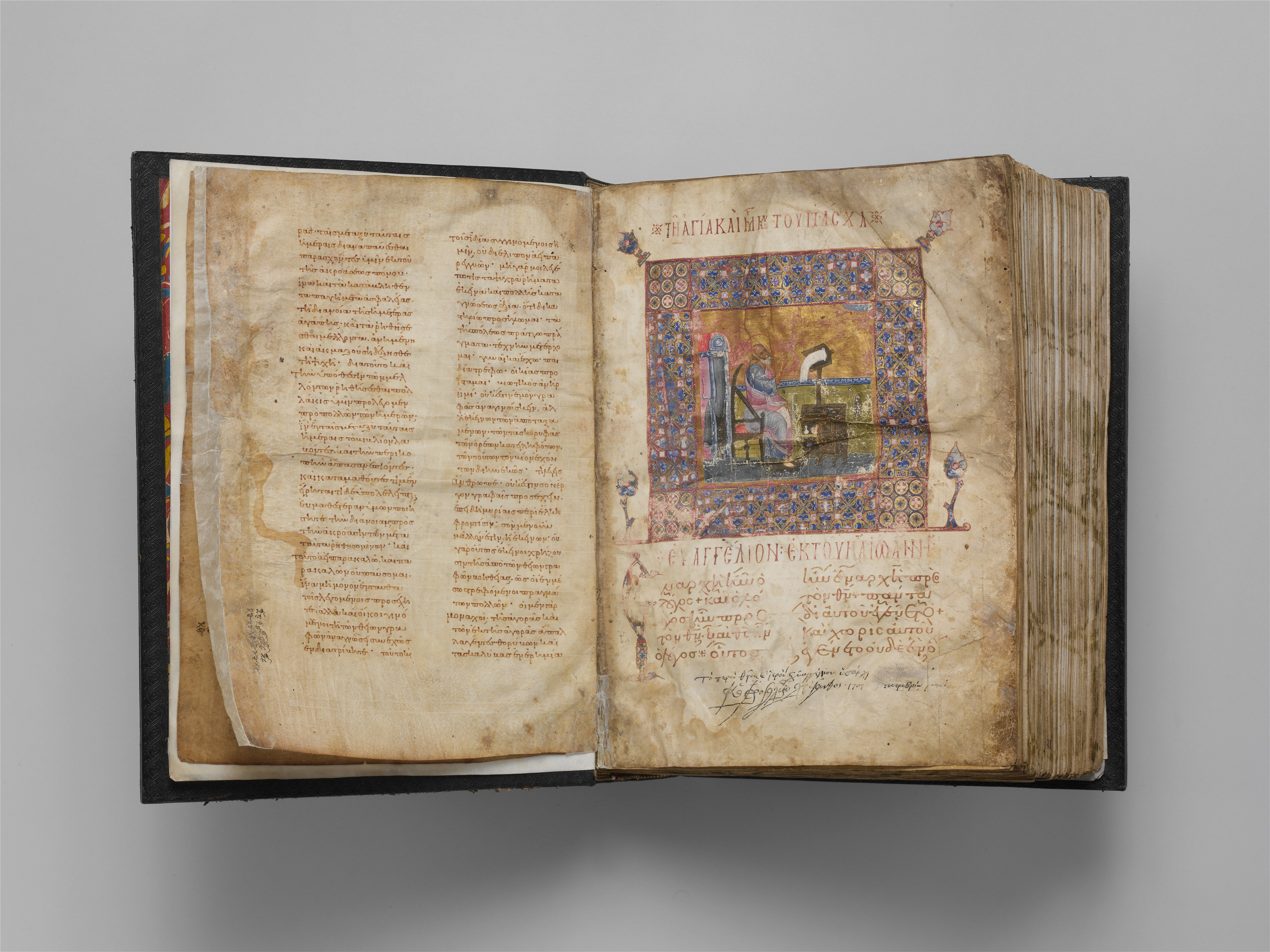
A Byzantine lectionary showing the opening pages for the Gospel of John (ca. 1100).

Building on a proposal by Theodor Nöldeke that the word "quran" is derived from a Syriac root meaning "reading aloud" or "reading matter" and Erwin Gräf's conjecture that this means lectionary,^{:70-71} Luxenberg reinterprets passages that make clear the Quran also considers itself, along the lines of a lectionary, as referring to scripture and as making this scripture accessible in Arabic. For example, Sura 41:3, traditionally understood as:

"A Book whose signs have been made distinct as an Arabic Quran...".

becomes according to the Syro-Aramaic reading:

"A Scripture that we have translated as an Arabic lectionary..."^{:120}

Likewise, Sura 12:1-2, which is traditionally translated as:

"These are the signs of the Book that is clear. Verily We have sent it down as an Arabic Qur'an; mayhap ye will understand.".

becomes:

"These are the letters of the [translated] Scripture. We have sent them down as an Arabic lectionary so that you may understand."^{:105-6}

=== Individual verses ===
==== A spring from below Mary ====
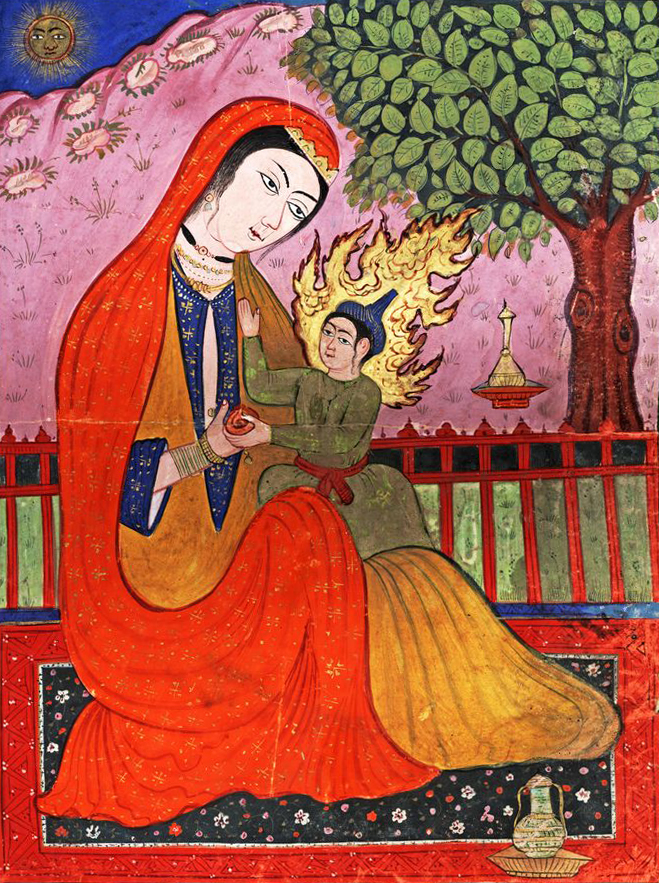
Islamic depiction of Maryam holding baby Īsā. From India, 1550-1600.

Luxenberg uses the Syro-Aramaic methodology (Ch 3) and various other emendations to reinterpret Sura 19:24.^{:51-4} Luxenberg suggests verse 24 should be read as a continuation of verses 16 and 22, which relate that Mary is cast out by her family on the suspicion of an illegitimate conception and verse 23 where Mary longs for her own death. Traditionally this verse is translated as:^{:140-2}

"Then he (probably 'the child') called to her from beneath her: 'Grieve not; thy Lord hath placed beneath thee a streamlet'."

Luxenberg considers this obscure and reinterprets the verse as:

"Then he called to her immediately after her delivery: 'Do not be sad, your Lord has made your delivery legitimate'."^{:140-2}

==== Resurrection ====
The theory of apodosis (Ch 12) is applied to Sura 2:259, regarding a man who does not believe in resurrection. He is made by God to die and revived after one hundred years. The verse is traditionally translated as:

"[L]ook at thy food and drink; it has not become stale; and look at thy ass - in order that We may make thee a sign to the people - and look at the bones how we shall make them stand up and clothe them with flesh."

is emended by Luxenberg to read:

"Yet behold your condition and your state: it has not changed. Behold your perfection! And therewith we make you an example for the people, [and] behold how we restore your bones and cover them anew with flesh!"^{:191-7}

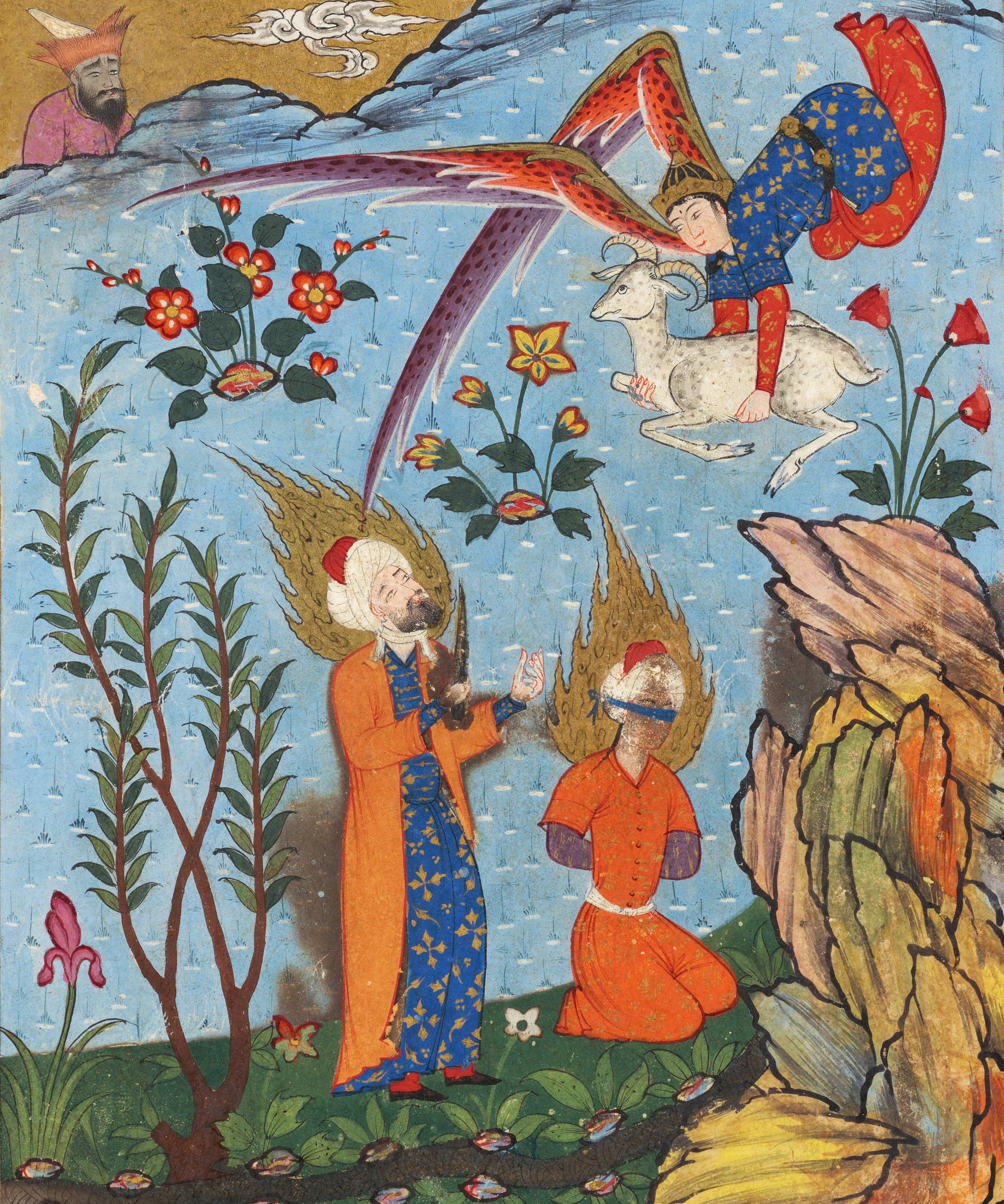
Ibrahim's sacrifice of his son Emsaeil is stopped by Jibril delivering a sheep instead.

==== Ibrahim's sacrifice ====
Another example of applying the theory of apodosis (Ch 12) is Sura 37:103, considered to be about Ibrahim's sacrifice of his son, reads when translated into English from Arabic, "And when they had both submitted and he put him down upon his forehead". But using Syriac instead of Arabic for almost the same Arabic rasm reads "...he tied him to the firewood".^{:167}^{:16-7}

==== Veil for women ====
A final example applying the theory of apodosis (Ch 12), in the analysing Sura 24:31, the part traditionally rendered as "they (women) should draw their veils over their bosoms", actually reads "they should beat their khumurs against their bags", which is incomprehensible. Luxenberg instead reads as "they should fasten their belts around their waists", an idiom, with the belt as a symbol for chastity without ordering any organ to be covered with cloth. According to him, the meanings of the words in the relevant part of the verse are as follows: خِمار khimār; cummerbund, جيب jayb; sinus, sac, وَلْيَضْرِبْنَ; "let them hit."

=== Thematic content ===
==== Virgins of paradise ====
Source:^{:787-790}

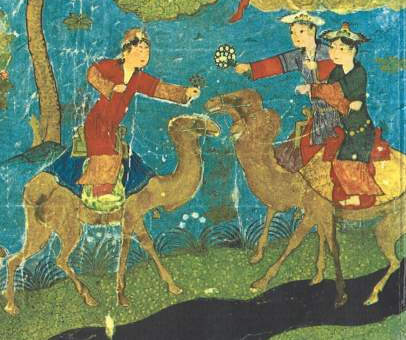
Houris in paradise, riding camels. From a 15th-century Persian manuscript.

In Chapter 15, the theme 'virgins of paradise' is discussed. The word houris, meaning "maidens with intensely black eyes set against the whiteness of their irises", who will serve the faithful in Paradise (Quran 44:54, 52:20, 55:72, 56:22) means (according to Luxenberg) "white grapes" or "raisins". He says that many Christian descriptions of Paradise describe it as abounding in pure white grapes. Thus, "the virgins who are supposedly awaiting good Islamic martyrs as their reward in paradise are in reality "white raisins" of crystal clarity rather than fair maidens... In both ancient Aramaic and in at least one respected dictionary of early Arabic, ḥūr means "white raisin". According to Luxenberg, the context makes clear that it is food and drink being offered.

==== The Boys of Paradise ====
In Chapter 16, the related "boys of paradise" refers rather to "wine".

=== Christian liturgical readings ===
In Chapter 17, two suras are read in light of the idea that they might represent Christian liturgical material.

==== Sura 108 ====
Sura 108 is significantly changed by the re-reading of only two words. The result is that verses 1 and 2 are made into a pair of parallel synonymous expressions. The outcome is interpreted to mean that this sura is a "Syrian liturgical pronouncement in the manner of 1 Peter 5.8-9"^{:66-7}

==== Sura 96 ====
The discussion of Sura 96 is much more detailed, rereading almost every verse, but with two being the most significant.^{:67-68}

	Sura 96: Conventional translation	Sura 96: Luxenberg's translation^{:320-3}
	In the name of Allah, the Beneficent, the Merciful.	In the name of Allah, the Beneficent, the Merciful.
1	Read: In the name of thy Lord who createth,	Call the name of your lord who has created,
2	Createth man from a clot.	(who) has created man from sticky (clay);
3	Read: And thy Lord is the Most Bounteous,	Call (indeed) your most admirable Lord,
4	Who teacheth by the pen,	who has taught by the reed pen (i.e. the scripture),
5	Teacheth man that which he knew not.	has taught man what he did not know at all.
6	Nay, but verily man is rebellious	Verily, man forgets,
7	That he thinketh himself independent!	when he sees that he has become rich,
8	Lo! unto thy Lord is the return.	that (this) is to be returned to your Lord.
9	Hast thou seen him who dissuadeth	If you see one who (wants) to stop
10	A slave when he prayeth?	a worshipper (of God) (from praying) when he is praying,
11	Hast thou seen if he (relieth) on the guidance (of Allah)	do you think (perhaps) that he is on the right path,
12	Or enjoineth piety?	or is even thinking pious thoughts?
13	Hast thou seen if he denieth (Allah’s guidance) and is forward?	If you (on the contrary) think that he is denying (God) and turning away (from Him)
14	Is he then unaware that Allah seeth?	(then) does he not know that God sees everything?
15	Nay, but if he cease not We will seize him by the forelock—	If he does not stop (doing that), (one day) we shall punish the adversary (severely),
16	The lying, sinful forelock—	the denying, wicked adversary!
17	Then let him call upon his henchmen!	May he call (then) on his whoever idol -
18	We will call the guards of hell.	(in doing so) he will call on transitory (gods)!
19	Nay! Obey not thou him. But prostrate thyself, and draw near (unto Allah).	You ought not to heed him at all, perform (instead) (your) divine service and take part in the liturgy of Eucharist.

== Conclusion ==
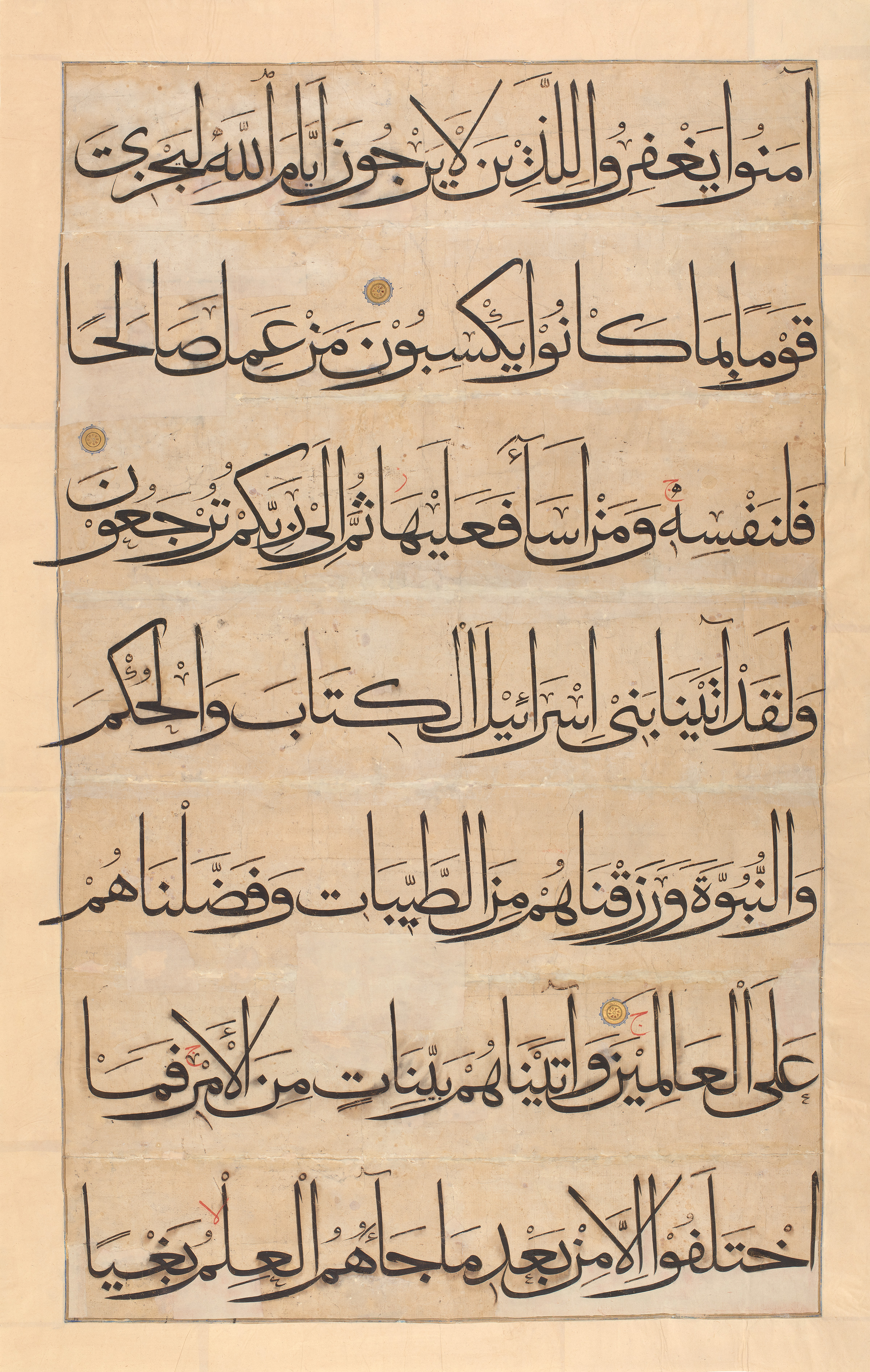
Quran verses vocalized in a reading tradition considered normative Classical Arabic: a highly regularized, rule-bound form codified by 8th–9th century grammarians e.g. Sibawayh.

On the basis of the many new readings that the application of the methodology has provided, five conclusions are drawn in the concluding Chapter 18.

First, if the Quran's language is that of the Meccan Quraysh tribe, this must be an Aramaic-Arabic hybrid language. Mecca was perhaps an Aramaic settlement just as the name "mecca" has a Syriac etymological root (ܡܟ /mk or makk) resulting in an adjective meaning "(the) lower (one)" as in "valley". Thus, whereas Meccans might have understood this language, other Arabs at a later time could not.^{:327-30}^{:69}

Second, Arabic exegetes mistakenly referenced the written Classical Arabic standardised only in the 8th century by Sibawayh. Furthermore, they referenced Old Arabic poetry instead of Scripture to explain Quranic passages. Thus, the later Arab exegetes and philologists (as well as modern Western Quran translators) had no easy task deciphering the defective Quranic rasm and made many misreadings.^{:330-31}

Third, Classical Arabic characteristically preserves the three case endings of a hypothetical proto-Semitic language as well as the hamza via the oral tradition of Old Arabic poetry. Arab philologists used this not only to add the hamza, alif (as mater lectionis) and vowel signs to the Quran, but also to fix the diacritics of the consonantal script. We must now for the first time dare to alter these.^{:331-2}

Fourth, a reliable oral transmission of the Quran must be deemed a legend. It was either interrupted early on or had considerable gaps: "this necessitates the assumption from the beginning of a text transmitted in writing".^{:330,332}

Fifth, the success of the presented analyses warrants doing a fundamental new reading of the Quran. Also, as Syriac lexicography was found crucial even to determine the Arabic vocabulary, a new Quran glossary is called for.^{:332-3}

== Popular reception ==
The book received considerable attention from the popular press in North America and Europe at its release.^{:16} It was featured in The New York Times, The Guardian, Le Monde, Die Zeit, Reuters, Newsweek, LebanonWire and Inquirer. Interviews with Luxenberg appeared in the Süddeutsche Zeitung, Die Welt and L'Actualité, amongst others. A 2008 Channel 4 (UK) documentary by Antony Thomas dedicated 10 minutes to the book and interviewed Luxenberg in an unrecognisable manner.

In the reviews, the book was hailed as "the most fascinating book ever written on the language of the Koran, and if proven to be correct in its main thesis, probably the most important book ever written on the Koran" but criticised as being "almost unreadable ... for the layman. One needs knowledge of eight languages (German, English, French, Latin, Greek, Hebrew, Arabic and Syriac) and of five different alphabets (Latin, Greek, Hebrew, Arabic, and the Syriac Estrangelo) to comprehend the book".

The widespread coverage was perhaps in large part due to its argument that the Quranic term Houri refers not to 'virgins' in Islamic paradise, but to 'grapes'.^{:16} The possibility that the suicide bombers and/or jihadists (collectively shahids) would be expecting beautiful women, and instead receive a bunch of grapes was met with mockery in the Western media with "one article in a German magazine published with the rhyming title Weintrauben statt Jungfrauen (Grapes instead of Virgins). By focusing on this argument, moreover, some journalists have found a medium by which to dramatize Islamic teachings of jihad and the sexual rewards of paradise, themes long the focus of anti-Islamic polemic. One journalist asks whether 'martyrs arriving in paradise may regard a bunch of grapes as a letdown'."^{:16}

Pakistan and Bangladesh banned a 2003 issue of Newsweek's international edition discussing Luxenberg's thesis on grounds that it was offensive to Islam. Kroes comments on this:

"The first reactions on Islamic sites on the internet were exclusively based on the article in Newsweek. So only the virgins or grapes figured in them. Mostly these reactions were rather polemic and generally lacked any solid reasoning. The widespread notion among Muslims that 'the west' or 'the orientalists' were just out to slander Islam and ideas about 'anti-Islamic propaganda' played a more important role than the simple facts. Only Shibli Zaman, a writer on an Islamic apologetic website, has some knowledge of Arabic, Hebrew and Syriac. He emphatically proves that the literal meaning of the word is 'white' and means 'eye' and that they don't mean 'grapes'. He doesn't realise however that Luxenberg doesn't deny these literal meanings at all. Zaman clearly didn't read the book."

== Scholarly discussion ==
=== General ===
A summary and discussion of reviews is provided in an appendix by King (2009) and in an article by Warraq (2014).

==== Overview ====
Opinions on Luxenberg's book diverge widely. A selection of reviews by 2011 were categorised as ranging from positive to critical and even scathing.^{:53} Positive reviews include Reynolds (2001), Gilliot (2003) and Phenix & Horn (2003). Scathing reviews include De Blois (2003), Hopkins (2003), Neuwirth (2003), and Saleh (2011). Highly critical, though open to some of the suggestions are Corriente (2003), Stewart (2007), and King (2009). Some additional reviews^{:28fn}^{fn11} (uncategorised) are: Maas (2003), Karimi-Nia (2004), Kroes (2004), Van Reeth (2006), Al-Jamal (2007) and Wild (2010). In all, some 50 academic articles and books had appeared discussing Luxenberg's work by 2014.^{:382-5}

Even competent philologists vehemently disagreed, with De Blois having "weighty criticisms", yet, others considering it "a scholarly book with some proposals of great consequence for our understanding of the Qur’an"^{:15} referring to: Phenix & Horn (2003), Brague (2003), Jansen (2003), Gilliot (2003) and Baasten (2004). (Note: Baasten 2004: "All in all, Luxenberg’s Syro-aramäische Lesart des Koran contains a wealth of original ideas and interesting observations, which might indeed have major implications for our understanding of the emergence of Islam".) Of a similar opinion are Dye & Larcher (2003) who consider it "most interesting", (Note: Dye and Larcher 2003: "From a linguistic point of view the undertaking of Luxenberg is one of the most interesting" (p. 131-2); "some of his theses do appear convincing" (p. 130).) Van Reeth (2006) who considers it "innovative”, (Note: Van Reeth 2006: "La plupart des critiques de Luxenberg se sont ainsi limités à corriger des erreurs (à vrai dire inévitables dans une recherche innovatrice de cette envergure)" (p. 512).) and Dye & Amir-Moezzi (2019) who consider it as having "suggestive insights".^{:27} (Note: Dye and Amir-Moezzi consider Luxenberg's theses, while judged as "too extreme" by many philologists and Quranic scholars, as containing suggestive insights.)

A 2005 conference about Luxenberg's book organised "fully in the spirit of traditional Islamic exegesis" left attendees "generally unconvinced".^{:165}^{:xi,1,9} However, some scholars sharing Luxenberg's skepticism regarding the Quran's origins have "gravitated towards Luxenberg’s approach"^{:29} namely: Sawma (2006), Kropp (2008), Van Reeth (2008) and similarly^{:17} also Younes (2008, 2009, 2011, 2017, 2019). Yet, others remain wholly unconvinced with Zellentin (2019) writing: "next to nothing in Luxenberg's reading has been confirmed in mainstream scholarship."^{:6} However, Dye (2017) cautions against a categorical dismissal, stating: "The way this book has been received in the academic world seems to me unsatisfactory. Luxenberg’s work has sometimes been enthusiastically praised, but also fiercely dismissed, quite often on dogmatic grounds."

==== Impact ====
Phenix and Horn (2003) write that, although similar works can be found in text-critical scholarship on the Bible:

"Not in the history of commentary on the Qur’an has a work like this been produced [thus] scholars of the first rank will now be forced to question the assumption that, from a philological perspective, the Islamic tradition is mostly reliable".^{:164} "Despite the sober revolution this book will no doubt create, one should not be naïve to think that all Islamicists in the West will immediately take up and respond to the scholarly challenges posed by any work of this kind. However, just as Christianity faced the challenges of nineteenth and twentieth century biblical and liturgical scholarship, so too will serious scholars of Islam, both East and West, benefit from the discipline Luxenberg has launched".^{:178}

Stewart (2007) counters this stating: "no stretch of the imagination allows one to see in Luxenberg’s work the introduction of a startling new critical paradigm into Qur’anic studies".^{:226}

Marx writes that Luxenberg's hypothesis had a positive impact on scientific discussions and perhaps accelerated the development of the long-term Corpus Coranicum project conceived of in 2006 by Angelika Neuwirth, Nicolai Sinai and Michael Marx himself.

Crone (2006) referred to Luxenberg's work as "open to so many scholarly objections [...] notably amateurism" which "cannot be said to have done the field much good".

Warraq (2014), after giving an extensive overview of reviews, concludes that "Luxenberg’s work has truly opened up a new era in Koranic Studies. He has provided the philology. His colleagues and co-researchers must now provide the historical context, and furnish the Judaeo-Christian and other Near Eastern and Babylonian sources."^{:370}

Dayeh (2019) writes that Luxenberg exemplifies a new subfield of investigation fixated on Muhammad as an author-writer, reducing Quranic studies "to a study of etymologies, loan words, and orthographical variants". This is problematic because it "neither corresponds to the way in which the Prophet is depicted in the Qur’an nor to the generic characteristics of the text. It is also problematic because it conflates prophecy, authorship, and writing".^{:31}

Zellentin (2019) writes of Luxenberg's book that:

"the interest which the broader public has taken in it continues to have a detrimental effects on the public - and especially the Muslim - reception of serious works of scholarship on the Qur'an. Luxenberg's work, nevertheless, forced scholars to re-evaluate the difficult question of the Qur'an's early transmission history and its multifaceted relationship with the Syriac tradition, which in turn led them to corroborate earlier findings that this tradition is indeed of special importance when seeking to determine the Qur'an's sociocultural and historical context".^{:6,17}

Stewart (2024), discussing the development of Western Quranic studies, writes:

"The publication of Christoph Luxenberg’s work on the 'decipherment' of the Quran in 2000 may be recognized as a watershed moment in [breaking through] the general lull in Western Quranic studies in the latter half of the twentieth century and the concomitant lack of attention to the relationship between the Quran and Biblical tradition. [...] The urge to refute the work provoked a wave of intense study of the Qur’anic text, the early history of Arabic script, inscriptions in Arabia and surrounding regions, early Islamic history, and the Qur’an’s relationship with Christian tradition. Interest in the Syriac language grew by leaps and bounds."

==== Implications for Islam ====
Dye and Larcher (2003) write that Luxenberg's undertaking "will provoke in some Islamic circles the same emotion as did the hypothesis of Vollers formerly, because it amounts to seeing in the Qur’ān a kind of palimpsest."

Davitashvili (2026) writes: "the book also negatively affected the way some Muslims understood the relationship between the Qurʾan and pre-Islamic Syriac literature. Comparative studies of these relationships were perceived by some academics of the Muslim world as 'an Orientalist challenge to be confronted'. For some Muslims, comparative analyses of the Qurʾan and Syriac literature ran the risk of denying the Qurʾan as God’s word, and denying its originality." Thus for Al-Jamal (2007),^{:63} "an identification of Qurʾanic words of Syriac origin such as the name "Qurʾan" itself (in Syriac: qeryānā) is intended to establish a connection between the Qurʾan and the 'language of Evangelium' and to cast doubts on the authenticity of key terms. For Al-Jamal, it means that God did not reveal the Qurʾan to Muhammad but that Muhammad took its language and content from Syriac Christian sources", Davitashvili notes. Likewise El-Badawi (2014) cautions that his analysis tracing Quranic concepts to Aramaic gospels is not intended to offend Muslims or pander to non-believers.^{:xiii}

==== Hostility and amateurism ====
De Blois (2003) calls Luxenberg a "dilettante" (an amateur) and posits that Luxenberg has an articulate knowledge of dialectal Arabic, passable (though flawed) command of classical Arabic, "knows enough Syriac so as to be able to consult a dictionary" and that it is impossible that Luxenburg is a professional scholar. He criticizes the New York Times' attempt to compare Luxenberg with Salman Rushdie, Naguib Mahfouz and Suliman Bashear, because De Blois claims to have information that Luxenberg is not German but rather a Lebanese Christian. There is thus no reason "to avoid the death threats of rabid Muslim extremists" and Luxenberg has no right "to conceal his (or her) identity". De Blois also writes that Luxenberg's makes mistakes in Arabic that are typical for the Arabs of the Middle East."

Corriente (2003) in contrast says that Luxenberg "appears to be an undoubtedly seasoned scholar, well at home in Syriac language and literature, also endowed with a remarkable command of Classical Arabic and versed in the Qur’anic sciences."^{:306}

Reynolds (2007) writes that Luxenberg's work "provoked an unusually polemical reaction from some. François de Blois concludes that Luxenberg’s new reading of the Qur’an, 'is a reading that is potentially attractive only in its novelty, or shall I say its perversity, not in that it sheds any light on the meaning of the book or on the history of Islam.' . . . Part of this hostility against Luxenberg may be due to the amount of attention that his work has received in the popular press".^{:16}

Stewart (2007): "Indignation is the word that most readily describes the majority of reactions to Luxenberg’s study on the part of scholars in Arabic and Islamic studies in countless statements on electronic discussion lists and elsewhere. Luxenberg’s audacity has rankled for three reasons primarily: he makes a radical proposal about the early history of Islam, he is not a professional scholar of Islam, and he emends the text of the Qur’an . . . It bears keeping in mind, however, that amateurs can produce important results, and that the work should be judged on its own merits rather than being dismissed summarily. After all, Michael Ventris was an amateur, yet his brilliant decipherment of Linear B indeed represented a revolution in the study of ancient Greek, and Schliemann, for all his eccentricities, did make fantastic discoveries at Troy and Mycenaea".^{:227-8}

Warraq (2014) writes that the initial academic reactions, in particular by De Blois, to the contribution by Luxenberg reminded of the previously disgraceful treatment by academics of Günter Lüling and John Wansbrough, whose contributions were in some ways precursors to the work of Luxenberg. However, Ibn Warraq notes that Claude Gilliot and Jan van Reeth, two distinguished researchers in Koranic Studies, "very courageously called attention to the scandalous review that François de Blois wrote of Luxenberg’s book".^{:356} Thus, Gilliot wrote in a footnote: "Apart from the fact that this article often distorts the thoughts of Luxenberg, it also contains allegations about the ethnic and religious background of the author (i.e., Luxenberg) which are hardly bearable".^{:92} Van Reeth stated that Luxenberg's publication challenged the stagnation in Quranic Studies that, with minor criticisms, repeated the legendary accounts of the revelation of Islam and this challenge "undoubtedly explains certain reactions. . . At the end, [De Blois'] criticism becomes wicked and personal; moreover, some of his remarks show an apparent lack of foundation".^{:511-12} (Note: The Gilliot and Van Reeth quotations as translated into English are by Ibn Warraq (2014).)

Stewart (2017) gives a broader perspective:

"many Islamicists denounced the work as shoddy scholarship that failed to cite the relevant studies in the field and did not adhere to the standard modes of Arabic and Islamic studies. For a number of these scholars, it rankled that an amateur wrote such a book as this, and they sought to defend their turf from the outsider. Most such defences focused on the method and approach of Luxenberg rather than on his concrete propositions about the text of the Qurʾan . . . Moreover, one must admit as well that most of the scholars who write on the Qurʾan are not at base specialists on the Qurʾan (or Syriac and Aramaic), but actually were trained in other subfields of Arabic and Islamic studies and so are also amateurs with respect to qur’anic scholarship. It is true that some of them are better Arabists than Luxenberg, but the difference between them might be one of degree rather than one of category".

=== Syro-Aramaic methodology ===
De Blois (2003) says that Luxenberg has "no real understanding of the methodology of comparative Semitic linguistics". Likewise, Neuwirth (2003) says that Luxenberg "limits himself to a very mechanistic, positivist linguistic method without caring for theoretical considerations developed in modern linguistics." However, Phenix and Horn (2003) write: "Luxenberg is aware that many features of a standard philological presentation are missing. These he promises in the final study."^{:165} Gilliot (2003) considers the philological method used by Luxenberg coherent and persuasive: "the method is undeniably rigorous" (Note: Gilliot: "La rigueur de la méthode est indéniable") and it converges with Gilliot's own work on the development of the Quranic text.^{:73} Yet, Dye (2019) writes that Luxenberg's method often "lacks rigor" whilst nevertheless creating "convincing results, or [...] stimulating avenues of inquiry".^{:768}

Hopkins (2003) argues the philological method to be wholly arbitrary.^{:73} Saleh (2011) describes Luxenberg's method as "so idiosyncratic, so inconsistent, that it is simply impossible to keep his line of argument straight." and criticises Luxenberg for not understanding that "The etymology of a word is a poor indication of what it means in a new context". (Note: Saleh additionally states that "The etymology of a word is a poor indication of what it means in a new context." He refers to Paul V. Mankowski's Akkadian Loanwords in Biblical Hebrew (Winona Lakes: Eisenbrauns, 2000), 1–13 and quotes M O'Conor's article "The Arabic Loanwords in Nabatean Aramaic" JNES 45 (1986), 215: "[T]he fundamental difficulty of all intra-Semitic language study: there is a common stratum of vocabulary and grammatical structure which makes it impossible to assign many words and formants to a particular language." Op cit, p. 55.) Likewise, El-Badawi (2014) writes that Luxenberg "does not systematically explain the arbitrariness of selecting Syriac words of his predilection to fit his new qur’ānic reading". Reynolds (2007) is also critical of the methodology, saying Luxenberg "turns from orthography to phonology and back again", his use of Syriac is "largely based on modern dictionaries" and that he "consults very few sources"—only one exegete (Abu Jafar al-Tabari)—and seldom integrates the work of earlier critical studies into his work^{:16}

De Blois (2003) believes that Luxenberg's theory is not novel but seems to be adapted from earlier works by James A. Bellamy and Günter Lüling. The fact that Luxenberg does not cite them in his bibliography "poses questions about [his] scholarly integrity." Likewise Neuwirth (2003) points out that Luxenberg doesn't consider the previous work in Quran studies. Hopkins (2003) criticises Luxenberg for frequently quoting "a few . . . favourite books (and very good books they are too), but seldom goes beyond them" such as with Goldziher and A. Levin's work on the imala. King (2009) adds that Goldziher and Lülling were discussed in a later edition of the book but "not incorporated into the text as a whole".^{:72-3} Kroes (2004) says that "his investigations should be done again, taking into account all the scholarly work that Luxenberg doesn't seem to know". Langermann (2008) writes Luxenberg "would have done well to avail himself of some works on comparative Semitics, such as the (by now) classical comparative grammars of William Wright and De Lacy O’Leary or the much more recent work of Edward Lipinski".^{:123}

Van Reeth (2006) considers Luxenberg's research innovative and fruitful, but hindered by a lack of confrontation with the Quran's literary context. Similarly, Witzum (2011) writes: "To conclude, one of the many flaws of the work of Luxenberg lies in his neglecting to examine actual Syriac texts, even when these deal with the same subject-matter as the Quran, and might lend support to some of his theories".^{:57} Likewise, El-Badawi (2014) writes that Luxenberg does not "identify any specific genre or corpus of Syriac literature to compare with the Qur’ān", thus, "while Luxenberg’s book provides rich—though often unsubstantiated—insights, and a handful of solutions to previously problematic passages, his work produces more problems in their place and is so methodologically problematic as it maintains an exclusive focus on philology, with little regard for the Qur’ān 'as a literary text...that has to be de-coded and evaluated historically'."

Dye (2017): "Clearly, Luxenberg’s method is often faulty, especially because of its disregard of any historical and literary context and, too frequently, its arbitrary use of linguistic evidence. However, Luxenberg offers many suggestions and emendations which should be examined case by case. Some of them are hasty, speculative, or unconvincing, but there are also very interesting and valuable insights (several examples given here owe him much). So the question should rather be: what can be extracted from the mass (and mess) of Luxenberg’s analyses."

=== Philological & linguistic findings ===
==== Garshuni ====
Luxenberg (2007, 2014) in a later article has himself tried to put forward empirical evidence from early Quran manuscripts for the theory that the Quran was first written in Syriac script.

King (2009) considers Luxenberg's theory of a Garshuni intermediary "more doubtful" than the idea of a written transmission, because "the Garshuni technique is unlikely to have existed at so early a date".^{:71}

==== Arabic script ====
Hemati, Shaker & Pirouz (2016) conclude that Luxenberg's 'understanding of the historical development of the Arabic alphabet and its Nabataean origins is historically inaccurate' and that 'while the early Hijazi and Kufic scripts lacked full diacritics, they were not as ambiguous as Luxenberg claims, and were perfectly sufficient for a society with a strong oral tradition (Tawatur)'.

Parsa & Nabaei (2023): "this essay has reached to the conclusion that Luxenberg's views are merely propaganda claims against Islam and the Holy Quran and there are several archaeological evidences, including several inscriptions in Arabic language, criticizing Luxenberg's view".

==== Phonological procedure for Syriacisms ====
King (2009) writes that the example maṯala^{n} as representing mathlē - used by Luxenberg to argue for the ’imāla phonological procedure for Syriacisms - is criticised by "Corriente and de Blois on the basis that the resulting Arabic is not grammatically correct (the verb should now be singular), and by Stewart on the basis that the unemended text is unproblematic, for which he adduces parallels" and, King adds, "this latter argument also seems to apply to the example suğğad^{an}."^{:46} Langermann (2008) considers this positively: "On the strong side, Luxenberg suggests that the final alif, which has, with great difficulty, been interpreted as an accusative in words such as mathalan (11:24) or al-hawaya (6:146), can be better explained on the basis of corresponding Aramaic forms".^{:123}

King (2009) considers Luxenberg's application of this method to interpret the frequently in the Quran occurring phrase Ibrahīm the Ḥanīf more successful. This is traditionally translated (in a broader context) as "Abraham the Ḥanif, and he was not one of the idolaters", but should according to Luxenberg be understood instead as Syriac meaning "Abraham was a heathen but he was not one of the idolaters". This renders it an "unexceptional and understandable piece of Christian or Jewish exegesis" and is an "important argument [that] has received cautious support [by Stewart^{:238-240}] as solving a series of grammatical conundra".^{:48} Carter (2006) is also positive, considering that Luxenberg offers "an attractive explanation for the appearance of words like Ḥanīf, 'primitive monotheist,' with a terminal alif implying the dependent case where that is not syntactically plausible; such words, he suggests, were originally borrowed with their Syriac definite article still attached, so ibrahīm Ḥanīf reproduces Syriac abrāhām hanpā, 'Abraham, the Ḥanīf'."^{:126}

==== Orthographic procedure for Syriacisms ====
Kroes (2004) writes that Luxenberg's argument that the small tooth more often represents long a (and that misreading this might explain the Arabic form of Ibrahim instead of Abraham) was corroborated in some early Sanaa codices and published in 1999, but this appears unknown to Luxenberg.

Likewise, Stewart (2007) concludes that:

"the suggestion that medial y may represent –ā- more frequently than hitherto realized is one of Luxenberg's tangible contributions. However, he connects this result rather unnecessarily and even illogically with Syriac. . . . [T]here is no necessary connection between the etymological derivation of Qur’ān [from Syriac qeryānā] and the fact that -y- in Qur’ānic script may sometimes represent -ā-. The problem with arguing Syriac influence on Qur’ānic orthography here is that the -y- in the Syriac does not actually represent -ā-, but simply the consonant -y-, and this contradicts the point Luxenberg is trying to make".^{:240}

King (2009)^{:50} says there is some corroboration of Luxenberg's orthographical theory by Donner (2007). Donner (2007) writes that some confirmation for Luxenberg's orthographic procedure can be found in early manuscripts: "Both the San‘ā’ Qur’āns and some other very early Qur’ān leaves also show at least occasional variant orthographies that suggest the use of a tooth as mater lectionis for ā. In all cases, however, this orthography is not consistent – that is, there is no surviving text which uses a tooth consistently to represent long ā."^{:38}

Stewart (2017) writes that some of Luxenberg's "remarks concerning the script of the Qurʾan are also worth consideration, such as the claim that a yāʾ in the script could represent the vowel -ā-, which is clearly true but seems to have little to do with Syriac".^{:23}

==== Theory of the apodosis ====
King (2009) concludes that Luxenberg's theory of the apodosis as carried over from Hebrew into Syriac and thence into Arabic is not proven by the evidence and thus requires "a great leap of the imagination."^{:55} One such emendation by Luxenberg concerning Ibrahim's sacrifice Sura 37:103-4 requires "so many leaps of the lexical imagination that one is left wondering whether one is not just being treated to an overall reading which is too convenient for the author’s meta-narrative of Christian origins to be taken seriously on philological grounds."^{:55-7} However, Reynolds (2007) considers Luxenberg's reading of Sura 37:104 "intellectually compelling".^{:16}

Dye (2017) rejects King's dismissal as "unduly dogmatic".^{:361} Dye writes: "In short: there are several Qur'anic verses where [there] is used a 'wa apodosis', a syntactical construction which is exceptionally rare in Classical Arabic, but present in various stages of Arabic, before and after the Qur'an".^{:362-3} Thus, "When Luxenberg writes that wa apodosis constructions 'should be understood (...) syntactically on the basis of a sentence construction that is also attested in part in the Syro-Aramaic translation of the Bible under the influence of Biblical Hebrew', he is right, in a way – this is without a doubt how some Qur’ānic verses should be understood and translated. However, it is far-fetched to look for close or direct influences from Biblical Hebrew, or from the few Hebraisms of the Pǝšiṭtā".

Moqbel (2025) considers Luxenberg's theory of the wa apodosis "not altogether implausible" while discussing Sura 18:47,^{:19} for example, and concludes: "I do not find King’s arguments sufficiently unsettling and, accordingly, I endorse the core of Luxenberg’s findings on the matter (and Dye’s careful arguments for them); namely, that the AW exists in the Qur'ān. I am also convinced that its existence is capable of being justified in terms of the Qur'ān itself and in accordance with its Semitic background. . . . I am content that the AW is, by and large, attested in the Qur'ān."^{:4} Moqbel adds: "I am not suggesting, however, that the Qur'ān was directly influenced by Biblical Hebrew or Syriac-Aramaic. All I want to say is that the Qur'ān, in its employment of the AW [wa apodosis], exhibits a telling alignment with texts that are prior to it."^{:11}

==== Syriac syntactical structures ====
Stewart (2007):

"Luxenberg’s claim that Qur’anic language was influenced by Syriac grammatical constructions is not all that far-fetched, though most reviewers have denied the possibility altogether. Since it is known that certain passages of the Qur’an are related to texts in Syriac/Aramaic and Hebrew, it is quite likely that some features of the text reflect the syntax and other linguistic features of those underlying texts, as is commonly observed in translations of sacred texts, such as the Septuagint, the Latin Vulgate, the Greek of the New Testament, or the King James Bible. Thus, Mingana suggested that not only key words and religious terms in the Qur’an are derived from Syriac, but also that the syntax of certain passages exhibits underlying Syriac influence. Luxenberg may be correct, for example, in attributing to the influence of an underlying language the construction found in the phrases wa-qatta‘nahum ithnatay ‘ashrata asbatan umaman (7:160) and thalath mi’at sinina wa-zdadu tis‘an (18:25), both of which violate classical Arabic grammar (and even dialectal usage) in that they use a plural noun after a number greater than ten. Thus, it is possible to accept some of Luxenberg’s general points as plausible. Little is new or revolutionary, however, as the author would claim. The problem with many of Luxenberg’s supposed Syriacisms is that many are well within the normal range of attested grammatical possibilities within Arabic itself".

Hemati (2024) concludes, regarding the phrase wa Qaṭṭa'nāhum Ithnatay 'Ashrata Asbāṭan in Sura 7:160, that "evidence of Syriac grammar and New Testament passages from the Syriac Gospel (Pashittā) do not support Luxenberg's claim."^{:167,172}

=== Emendations and reinterpretations ===
==== Overview ====
Overview of reception of Luxenberg's emendations per sura/verse^{:7-8}
2 2:23 2:25 2:26 -- 2:69 2:71 2:98 2:125 -- 2:126 2:162 2:164 2:248 2:249 2:255 + 2:259 3:2 + 3:7 3:15 3:40 3:119 3:128 3:144 4:57 4:82 5 - 5:93 6:138 6:145 6:146 -- 6:162 7:40 7:54	7:56 7:143 7:160 + -- 7:180 8:2 8:4 9:1 10:4 10:38 11:13 11:24 -- 11:70 11:82 11:86 + 11:116,117 12:1-2 12:15 12:16 12:32 12:36 12:84 12:88 o 13:31 13:39 14:4 14:5 14:32 14:37 14:41 15:52 15:74 16:12	16:14 16:79 + 16:103 17:64 + 17:66 18:9 18:25 + -- 18:47 18:49 18:61 18:79 + 18:94 19:5 19:8 19:23 19:24 -- 19:25 19:26 19:65 19:90 19:97 19:98 20:33,34 20:36 20:105 20:111 + 20:114 20:132 21:21 21:34 21:87 21:96	22:2 22:26 -- 22:36 23:60 24:31 25:3 25:40 26:63 26:84 26:90,91 - 26:195 30:2 30:3 30:4 30:5 30:30 31:10 33:53 + 33:63 34:5 35:9 35:12 36:56 37:48,49 37:11 37:78,79 + 37:103,104 38:52 38:82 39:29 -- 41:3 41:40	41:44 41:47 + 42:7 42:22 42:51 43:12 43:70 43:71 44:35 44:54 44:58 47:15 48:29 50:31 50:40 51:47 52:20 52:24 52:37 54:7,17,22 54:32,40 54:43 55:56 55:68 55:70,72,74 56:2 56:6 56:17,18,19 56:22,23 56:34-37 66:4 67:15	68:13 68:42,43 68:51 69:14 69:23 70:23 70:44 73 74 74:31 -- 74:51 - 75:17,18 76:14 76:15 76:19 78:20 78:32 78:33 79:27 80:15 80:22 81:3 81:13 82:7 87:6 88:22 96 - 96:16 105:41 106:1 108 + 114:5
LEGEND ++ general endorsement; + some support (incl. for individual words); o neutral (incl. alternatives without preference); - some criticism (incl. for individual words); -- general rejection; Bold sura/verse represents a more comprehensive emendation.
SOURCES Completely included: Corriente (2003), Carter (2006), Hemati & Shaker (2017), Hemati (2024). Partially included: Stewart (2007).

==== Quran as lectionary emendation ====
Kroes (2004) writes: "If qur'an was indeed derived from Syriac Qeryana 'lectionary', that still does not mean that the Qur'an actually was a Christian lectionary, at most it had a comparable function: text to be recited."

Kerr (2014) is of the opinion that "Luxenberg convincingly shows [that] the word Qur’ān itself is an Aramaic loan-word" and suggests its meaning to have been "scriptura sacra [holy scripture]".^{:163}

Hemati, Shaker & Tabrizizadeh (2019), using a historical-comparative linguistic analysis, are critical of Luxenberg's interpretation of quran as deriving from Syriac qeryana and its meaning as lectionary.

==== Various ====
Corriente (2003) believes that among Luxenberg's "positive contributions to the interpretation of the Qur’anic text and to the present levels of knowledge of the Arabic language are some terms of Aramaic origin to be added to those listed by Jeffery", of which Corriente proceeds to list a dozen.^{:310}

King (2009) judges Luxenberg's reading of Sura 6:146 (discussing the dietary restrictions imposed on the Jews) favorably, with Witzum (2011) adding that this is one example where Luxenberg's "argument could have been stronger had he worked with texts rather than dictionaries, as this passage seems to reflect Leviticus 7:22-25", which clearly shows this to be "a Christian report on Jewish dietary laws".^{:34-35}

Dye and Kropp (2011) consider Luxenberg's explanation for the Arabic pronunciation (‘Īsā) of the name Jesus (يسى) as the result of "post-Quranic phonetics" unconvincing. Luxenberg considers the spelling of the final -ā using alif maqṣūra (ى) instead of alif (ا) significant and suggests it should actually be pronounced -ay. This would more closely match the Syriac pronunciation ’Īšay (with a voiceless glottal stop hamza at the beginning). Dye and Kropp see "no reason to follow Luxenberg".

==== Themes: Virgins in Paradise & Boys of paradise ====
Bannoura (2026)^{:330} writes: "Luxenberg’s philological methodology and conclusions about ḥūrʿīn were roundly critiqued [by Wild, Saleh, Donner, Griffith and Neuwirth].

Gilliot (2003) considers the crux of Luxenberg's reading of huris convincing.^{:73}

Corriente (2003) argues that Luxenberg appears to downplay "native Arabian ingredients of Islam in favour of an ecumenical levelling of the main dogmatic and ethical principles of all monotheistic religions" which is examplified in his "typically Pauline dislike for unnecessary and unbecoming sex in Paradise, not extensive however to other equally earthly pleasures, such as food and drink".^{:306}

Warraq describes how Van Reeth (2006) considers Luxenberg’s analysis of the boys of paradise brilliant^{:359} and says that Van Reeth "with his unequaled knowledge of the history of Christianity, in general, and Syriac Christianity, in particular, builds on Luxenberg’s thesis concerning the Koranic descriptions of Paradise to produce a totally convincing account of the sources of the entire tradition. Where Luxenberg goes back to St. Ephrem, Van Reeth’s starting point is two Biblical passages in Genesis and Psalms [...] the book of Enoch 10:19, [...] the second Book of Baruch 29:5–6, [and] words of Papias, Bishop of Hierapolis, with the Hymns of Paradise of St. Ephrem filling in the gaps and closing the story."^{:359} Van Reeth's alternative reading was rejected by Luxenberg in a footnote in a later edition of the book.^{:789}

Saleh (2010) noted that "Luxenberg fails to mention that the Qurʾanic paradise, even with the absence of maidens, is still radically different from any Late Antique Christian understanding of paradise."^{:684} Thus:

"One is left with the impression that Muhammad, having taken his inspiration of paradise from St. Ephrem, is unable to embellish it, and we are not told why this is the case. If St. Ephrem could have a vision of paradise, why cannot Muhammad? Luxenberg seems to think that grapes are less fantastic a thing to encounter in the afterlife than boys or virgin brides. That the Qur'an has its own understanding of the afterlife is denied simply because it is derivative".^{:684}

Furthermore, Saleh states that "to claim that the issue of the subject is clarified by the content of the Hymns of Paradise is not only perverse, but simply nonsensical".^{:687} He instead suggests that the virgins of paradise might reflect a Greek Hellenic mythological depiction of Zeus’s "oxen-eyed" (buōpis) consort Hera, and the boys of paradise might borrow from the cup-bearer of Zeus from Ganymede.^{:689-91} Thus:

The whole joyful hedonistic atmosphere of the Qurʾanic paradise is more akin to the lives of the gods of Olympus than to the asceticism and sensibilities of late Antique Christianity [which] was busy enshrining the monastic ideal ... Reading the Hymns and the Qurʾanic depictions one is struck by their different considerations and presuppositions. The Qurʾanic depictions could not be more different than their supposedly Christian sources. St. Ephrem’s Hymns on Paradise are a long poetic analogy of what paradise is like, and the poem makes clear that all the imagery is metaphorical and as such a textually induced imagery.^{:689-90}

El-Badawi (2014): "While it is quite clear that the qur’ānic description of ḥūr ‘īn does not refer to white grapes but rather women, it is equally clear that the description of [Verse] 56 has the imagery of the bridal chamber of Syriac literature in mind, including Aphrahat’s Demonstration on Death and the Last Days. It is not uncommon to find descriptions of paradise associated with hanging fruit in both the Qur’ān and the extant corpus of Syriac literature. Oddly enough, Luxenberg does not make this case."

Yousef Kouriyhe "systematically discusses the role of the qur’ānic ḥūr‘īn—which Luxenberg fails to do—and the relationship to its counterpart in Syriac literature. Kouriyhe ultimately corroborates the qur’ānic notion of the term while staying true to its conceptual, Syriac precedent. He argues that the ḥūr/ḥūrāyē are symbols—hanging fruit—of virgin female companions for which desert hermits longed, but to whom they could only allude".^{:29}

Griffith (2017) acknowledges the importance of Ephraem the Syrian, but argues the evidence does not support re-reading the Qur’anic houris as grapes:

"in the writings of Ephraem the Syrian and the Syriac liturgical tradition in general one does find, contrary to Christoph Luxenberg's view, an abundance of marital and sexual imagery in the description of the joys of the garden of paradise. What relations this lush imagery in Syriac literature might have to the depictions of paradise in the Arabic Quran is another matter."^{:799} "[A]t the very least the [Quran intended] to address an audience within that same frame of reference[: an] Arabic-speaking audience, living within the range of the Syriac-speaking churches of Late Antiquity".^{:800-801}

Courtieu (2020) arrgued how "vocabulary and descriptions of objects, food, and beverages in the Qurʾan’s paradise seem to borrow heavily from Middle Persian vocabulary, as well as customs and artifacts associated with banquets at the Persian court", thus tracing "the term ḥūr back to the Middle Persian etymological form of hurūst". The presentation of half-naked women with large eyes and "almost every description of paradise" can be traced to Sasanian "iconography, mosaics, and silverware". The male counterparts wildān and ghilmān "would have been young men who bore cups and also served as servants and musicians".^{:331-2}

Bannoura (2026) supports Courtieu as "it seems plausible here to assume that these Middle Persian loanwords would have entered the Qurʾan through a Syriac source" ant that it seems plausible to relate the "Qurʾan’s paradisiacal imagery . . . to pre-Islamic poetry, Greek mythology, or Sasanian banquets".^{:333}

==== Liturgy: Suras 108 and 96 ====
Gilliot (2003) (Note: Gilliot 2003: "[ils] ont convaincu de la justesse de sa demarche" p. 390)) is particularly convinced of Luxenberg's re-readings of Sura 108 and 96 "including the liturgical reading of the latter".^{:73}

Gilliot and Larcher (2003) consider Sura 108 (al-Kawṯar) "convincingly deciphered" by Luxenberg. However, they do not accept all new readings, finding that Luxenberg's fecundity in producing new interpretations invokes scepticism.^{:361}

Baasten (2004) considers many of Luxenberg's readings of Quran verses "stunning", suddenly turning some Sura's into "coherent texts." This is "convincing" in the case of Sura 108 (al-Kawṯar) and "most convincing" for Sura 96 except for some details.^{:364} Concluding: "His proposals often do lead to a better understanding of impenetrable Quranic passages, which in itself is a major achievement and a challenge for historians of early Islam".^{:364}

King (2009) strongly disagrees that Luxenberg's reading of Sura 108 is convincing.^{:66-7}

Dye (2019) writes that Luxenberg creates "convincing results, or [...] stimulating avenues of inquiry" in his studies of Suras 97 and 108.^{:768}

=== Conclusions ===
==== Syriac-Arabic hybrid language ====
Corriente (2003) strongly criticises Luxenberg's theory of a hybrid language (Syriac Vorlage) as "not convincing in most cases, because the philological arguments . . . do not have the necessary weight to counteract the previous more traditional views on this topic, grounded as they are on solid historical and socio-linguistic data."^{:314}

Baasten (2004): "Whether one should go along with [Luxenberg's] more far-reaching statements, on the Syriac-Arabic mixed language of Mecca or an Aramaic Urkoran, is something that further research will make clear".^{:72}

Carter (2006): concludes "it is difficult to go as far as Luxenberg ... and claim that the Arabic spoken in Mecca was a 'hybrid of Aramaic and Arabic'."^{:138}

King (2009) a Syriacist at the University of Cardiff, endorses some of Luxenberg's emendations and readings but concludes:

"Luxenberg's meta-theory of Qur'ānic origins is not proved by the evidence he sets forth in this book. That certain of the Qur'ān's expressions and words (as well as broader ideas and themes) are of Christian origin is well founded, and should in general be sufficient to explain the data presented here without needing recourse to either of the two more radical theories he espouses, namely that the Qur'ān was in origin no more than a Christian lectionary, and that the language which it is written is an 'Aramaic-Arabic hybrid'. More must be offered to convince anybody as to the mechanisms by which such a strong cultural and linguistic contact could have occurred".^{:69-71}

Stewart (2007): "Luxenberg’s claim that Qur’anic language was influenced by Syriac grammatical constructions is not all that far-fetched, though most reviewers have denied the possibility altogether . . . Many of his emendations of the text, however, do not involve any recourse to Syriac vocabulary or constructions, or do so only by a considerable stretch of the imagination".^{:226,237}

Donner (2007) considers Luxenberg's idea of a mixed Arabic-Aramaic language his "most daring proposal" but criticizes him for not making an effort to clarify what he actually means, such as: a Syriac–Arabic pidgin that died out, or instead whole Aramaic passages embedded within an otherwise Arabic text (which Donner considers "highly plausible")? As this ambiguity allows Luxenberg the freedom to interpret difficult passages in ways that would otherwise be considered ungrammatical, this theory offers a "convenient pretext" to freely interpret the text. Donner concludes: "Some of the negative reviews of Luxenberg’s book have, with perfect justice, castigated him for failing to demonstrate the grammatical cogency of some of his proposed emendations. . . [However] the proposal deserves full investigation, not the reflexive rejection it sometimes elicits".^{:38-40}

Saleh (2010) sums up his assessment of Luxenberg as follows:

The first fundamental premise of his approach, that the Qur'ān is a Syriac text, is the easiest to refute on linguistic evidence. Nothing in the Qur'ān is Syriac, even the Syriac borrowed terms are Arabic, in so far as they now Arabized and used inside an Arabic linguistic medium. Luxenberg is pushing the etymological fallacy to its natural conclusion. The Qur'ān not only is borrowing words according to Luxenberg, it is speaking a gibberish language.

El-Badawi (2014) presents a more nuanced take on what Luxenberg's "hybrid language" (Mischsprache in the German version of the book) might mean:

"The evidence adduced in this study makes it clear that circulating traditions from the Aramaic Christian sphere intersected with the Qur’ān’s milieu early, on multiple occasions, and from different individual sources. These crucial observations are illustrated best in the opening verses of the so called ‘Meccan Surahs,’ including [Sura] 51:1–9 which integrates terminology from Syriac, CPA, and Jewish Aramaic into the Arabic cognate accusative grammatical constructions (maf‘ūl mutlaq) that are a hallmark of the cryptic prophetic speech employed in the Qur’ān. . . . The integration of terminology from different Aramaic dialects—and not Syriac alone—into Arabian prophetic speech might reflect a more nuanced understanding of what Luxenberg calls Mischsprache. The multiplicity of Aramaic substrata is diffused throughout the Qur’ān text . . . and confirms our claim . . . that the process of dialogue between the Qur’ān and the Aramaic Gospel Traditions [see Palestinian Syriac version of the Bible and Syriac versions of the Bible] took place over centuries."^{:216}

Stewart (2017): "Luxenberg’s claim that the Qurʾan was written in a mixed Arabic-Aramaic language seems preposterous, given the lack of historical evidence for such a language. All that one might be able to claim responsibly is that there were groups of Arabic speakers who had adopted Christianity before Islam who must have had Syriac as their liturgical language and Arabic as their spoken language, a situation that exists till this day in Christian communities in the Levant. Such speakers in the community would have had control of both idioms, and terms from the liturgical language may have come into use in popular speech".^{:22}

Dye (2017) explores phenomena of bilingualism or multilingualism in the Quran, phenomena which Luxenberg drew attention to and concludes:

"These reflections, and all the examples studied above, suggest that we are dealing with a language, or sociolect (i.e. Qur’ānic Arabic), which was spoken and used in a multilingual context (with all the consequences of such a situation), where Aramaic was a prevalent language ([especially] in religious matters). Even more: the people behind the compositions of such Qur’ānic Psalms, madrāšē, and so on (see for example suras 3, 5, 18, 19, 96…), were certainly scribes with a high literacy in Arabic and Aramaic. And since, as we saw, we have in Qur’ānic Arabic many phenomena related to bilingualism, interference, and language contact (and there are many more, [especially] if we allow changes in the punctuation of the rasm), that is to say, loanwords, Lehnprägung [= loan shifting], Lehnbedeutung [= loan extensions], semantic calques, uses of foreign words (namely, insertions), influence of foreign syntactical structures (congruent lexicalization) – in other words, code-switching and code-mixing –, then it seems that studying such aspects of the Qur’ān with the tools of translation technique may be very promising".^{:22}

Van Putten (2022), in an authoritative investigation of the Quran's language, concludes that "Nearly all isoglosses that can be deduced from the [Quranic consonantal text], align with Hijazi Arabic" - which could preclude a hybrid-language - without however explicitly addressing any of Luxenberg's theories or the phenomena described by Dye.^{:216}

==== Historical context ====
Hopkins (2003) criticizes the book for making no attempt to "place its findings in any plausible historical context" such as who these "Christian inhabitants of pre-Islamic Mecca" were and how they came to so thoroughly misunderstand their book.^{:380}

Gilliot (2003) sees no problem with Luxenberg staying strictly within the field of comparative philology and himself suggests a possible historical reconstruction for the influence of Aramaic based on the tradition that Zayd ibn Thābit, the personal scribe of Mohammed and chief recorder of the Quran, was a Jew who spoke Aramaic.^{:73}

Hoyland (2007) argues against Luxenberg's thesis that Syriac was prevalent in the Hijaz during the time of the Quran's inception, instead finding Arabic script on funerary text, building text inscriptions, graffiti, and stone inscriptions of that era in the area.^{:61-64} He further argues that Arabic evolved from Nabataean Aramaic script not Syriac.^{:60-61} He concludes that by the 7th century Arabic was widely written and spoken, and was used for literary and sacred expression.^{:63-64} He proposes that the rise of an Arabic script in the sixth century was likely the work of Arab tribes allied to Rome and Christian missionaries working to convert Arab tribes.^{:57-60}

Reynolds (2007) writes: "While Luxenberg’s opponents often criticize this point, it seems to me quite justifiable, even prudent, in light of our uncertain historical knowledge of Islamic origins. Of course, most of Luxenberg's opponents have more confidence in the historical reliability of the master narrative of Islamic origins than he does."^{:15}

Rippin (2007) formulates it most strongly: "For those like Luxenberg who wish to see an even stronger Syriac presence in the text, the need to account for the mechanism by which this happened and, especially, to place that in a context of what we can postulate about the emergence of the text of the Qur’an itself, is even more compelling. That is, all the philological knowledge in the world is not going to help unless that is combined with a historical picture related to the emergence of the text of the Qur’an."^{:259}

Böwering (2007) writes about the work of Azzi (2001) who revisited the relation between the Quran and the Ebionites. Muslim tradition has it that Muhammad's cousin Waraqah ibn Nawfal became a Christian in pre-Islamic times who was literate, copied passages from the Christian scriptures and "recognized Muhammad’s prophetic mission immediately after his first Qur’anic revelation". Azzi instead depicts Waraqah as a priest who was the head of a small Ebionite community at Mecca and, as Muhammad's teacher and mentor, prepared him to be his successor. However, "Muhammad betrayed this project when he migrated to Medina and there became the head of the new Islamic state". This furthermore explains the difference between the earlier and later Quran because "The original Qur’an, assembled by the priest, was intended to serve as a lectionary for the ritual worship of the Christian Arab community of Mecca". Böwering qualifies Azzi's theory as "highly speculative and poorly documented", but as a direction of investigation that could support Luxenberg's purely philological work.^{:79-80}

Gilliot (2007): "The historical basis that is lacking in the work of Luxenberg might be partly found in Syriac literature, and partly in the bond which, according to the Muslim sources, existed between Muhammad and those who enthroned him as a prophet (Waraqa b. Nawfal, Khadija, and others), or those who furnished him with reports or enriched those that he already possessed on the Bible and post-Biblical literature".^{:101}

King (2009) writes: "a philological and linguistic argument by itself could be sufficient to prove cultural contact even if it were impossible to reconstruct how that contact might have come about."

Witzum (2011): "The textual study of the Quran and the examination of its Jewish and Christian sources must precede historical speculation. While work in this direction has been undertaken in many studies ... further endeavors are necessary if the historical reconstruction is to be reliable".^{:257, 279} Yet, "Looking at the Arabian Peninsula as a whole, it can be shown that Christianity had spread throughout it"^{:259} and new forms of contact are being proposed, such as by Serafim Seppälä who is quoted as saying: "My own estimation is that, if the author of the Qur’an had direct contact with Christian texts, the most likely possibility is that he heard recitation of Syriac hymns related to liturgical feasts, in addition to Gospel readings from Syriac Qeryana".^{:262-3}

==== Syriac Christianity (Quran as referencing scripture) ====
Van Reeth (2006) proposes that the Gospel in the Quran refers to the Syriac Diatessaron. Van Reeth: "the holy book that was read by the community, of which Muhammad was a member, was a Syriac book" and this conclusion "reinforces ... the theory of Luxenberg".^{:73} (Note: Van Reeth (2006): "nous avons ainsi essayé de démontrer que les péricopes évangéliques dans le Coran remontent au Diatessaron, l’harmonie des évangiles que le Syrien Tatien [a composée]. . . . Ce onstat s'ajoute à la théorie de Luxenberg tout en la renforcant: le livre sacré que lisait la communauté à laquelle appartenait Muhammad, était un livre en syriaque" (p. 73).) This conjecture is reinforced by El-Badawi (2014) who "traces Qurʾanic concepts and terms in the Diatessaron of Tatian and Syriac gospels, both of which El-Badawi places within this 'Aramaic Gospel tradition [see Palestinian Syriac version of the Bible and Syriac versions of the Bible]'."^{:7}

Griffith (2007), while building on the work of Georg Graf, argued "convincingly that the Bible had not been fully translated into Arabic before the rise of Islam. This would mean that many Arabic speaking Christians relied on Aramaic/Syriac scripture at the time of Islam’s origins."^{:15}

Al-Azmeh (2014) writes: "Recent research indicates that fragments of a Syriac gospel may have ciruclated in the Hijaz, in addition to various Pseudoepigraphic gospels in Syriac, albeit with obscure histories and forms of circulation".^{:492}

McCoy (2021) writes that with the notable exception of Saleh and Casewit modern scholarship has paid almost no attention to the contributions made by some medieval Muslim exegetes - notably Ibn Barrajan and al-Biqai - who interpreted the Quran using Arabic versions of the Bible.^{:xi-xii} They placed authority in the canonical texts of the Old and New Testament, seeing them as divine knowledge, and considered the Hebrew and Christian scriptures as identical to the Tawrah and Ingil referred to in the Quran".^{:1-7}

==== Syriac Christianity (subtext or influence) ====
Neuwirth (2003) describes Luxenberg's thesis of Quran as "a corpus of translations and paraphrases of original Syriac texts recited in church services as elements of a lectionary." She considers it as "an extremely pretentious hypothesis which is unfortunately relying on rather modest foundations." Neuwirth concludes "Luxenberg's reading with its far-reaching conclusions has – though in itself little convincing since largely relying on circular argument – revived the debate about the role of Syriac, as the most vigorous linguistic medium in the transmission of knowledge in Near Eastern late Antiquity, in the emergence of the Qur'an"

Böwering (2007) writes: "Unfortunately, Luxenberg cannot document a single short sura in its actual Arabic wording that can be set side by side its supposedly Syriac substratum. While he examines three suras in their entirety, their dependence on Syriac is hardly as certain as he wishes it to be".^{:78} Böwering concludes: "Not a single written source, whether scriptural or liturgical, however, has been identified that would satisfy the search for an underlying Ur-Qur’an, whether postulated as a Christian hymnal or a Syro-Aramaic lectionary, that served as a written source book for the Qur’an. [Instead,] Essential sections of the Qur’anic message were received from the oral lore of a variety of religious communities who were rooted in the widely dispersed and non-normative Jewish and Christian traditions".^{:83}

Griffith (2007) "a central figure for scholarship on the Qur’ān in light of Syriac Christian literature", completely rejects a Jewish-Christian substratum to the Quran and cautions against reductionist theories of a direct, linear influence. Griffith instead expounds "complex, diffuse, diverse, and free flowing ideas" present in the thematic context of the Quran's origins. Thus, "Among many studies Griffith convincingly argues that qur’ānic language concerning the Trinity, the nature of Jesus and the story of the Youths of Ephesus ([Sura] 18:9-26) are all informed by an intimate understanding of Syriac Christian literature".

El-Badawi (2014) describes a lack of scholarly consensus regarding the contribution of Syriac/Aramaic Christian literature to the Quran and that three schools of thought can be distinguished:

- On the one hand "the Luxenberg school" who argue that the Quran was originally a Syriac Christian liturgical text. Supporters are those belonging to the Inârah Institute (a subgroup of revisionist scholars), see also Kropp, Van Reeth, and Sawma. This group is marginalised and their claims "hotly contested, if not rejected outright by most Qur’ān specialists".
- On the other end of the spectrum Neuwirth who considers the Quran "fundamentally a text of late antiquity and belonging to the Arabian context illustrated in Islamic tradition. The relationship between qur’ānic passages and Syriac Christian literature are only part of a wider intertextual dialogue between the Qur’ān and religious works of late antiquity".
- The middle ground is represented by Reynolds who diminishes the tafsir tradition and also rejects a Christian liturgical urtext, instead advocating for reading the Quran "through the lens of late antique Syriac Christian homiletic literature", i.e. to read the Quran "as a homily".

El-Badawi concludes stating "the field continues to change and . . . there is hope that new work by Zellentin, El-Badawi and others will tread a path between that of Neuwirth and Reynolds".

El-Badawi (2014) "demonstrates how the Qur’ān, via the agency of the late antique lingua franca of the Near East—Aramaic—selectively challenged or re-appropriated, and therefore took up the "dogmatic re-articulation" of language and imagery coming from the Aramaic Gospel Traditions, in order to fit the idiom and religious temperament of a heterogeneous, sectarian Arabian audience".

Neuenkirchen (2022) writes: "many subsequent scholarly endeavours, while most definitely benefiting from the momentum created by Luxenberg’s book, have offered much more pondered and contextualized approaches to the question of the relationship between the Syriac milieu and that in which the Quran emerged. . . . Among the different literary genres of [Syriac writings], homilies have proven to be choice candidates for such comparative purposes."

==== Altering diacritics (Imposed ideal of Classical Arabic) ====
Al-Jallad (2020) seems to argue in the direction of Luxenberg theory of Classical Arabic when proposing that it is "the outcome of a complex interaction between Old Hijazi, i.e. the language of the Quran and early Islamic Arabic on the one hand and the poetic register of the Qaṣīdahs of the Maʕaddites on the other."^{:150} However, Al-Jallad considers Luxenberg's proposed reading revisions one example among various proposals about the nature of the text of the Quran - the other explicitly mentioned being Vollers - that "failed to find the proper degree of substantiation in the evidence itself".^{:59}

Van Putten (2022), without in any way subscribing to the idea of a Syriac hybrid language, similarly to Luxenberg considers the later addition of diacritics in the various reading traditions to have been mostly artificial^{:215} and thereby to have imposed the ideal of Classical Arabic with regard to both the hamza and case endings on the Quranic consonantal text (which van Putten identifies as Old Hejazi Arabic):

"the readers were actively aiming to make the language of the Quran more in line with what they considered to be the proper ʕarabiyyah. This can be clearly seen from the fact that readers were concerned with questions of pseudocorrect application of the hamzah—a feature said to be absent in the language of the Hijaz. But also, perhaps more controversial, I suggest we can see traces of the Classical Arabic case system having been imposed onto the original language as reflected in the [Quranic consonantal text], which had lost most of its word final short vowels and tanwīn."^{:216}

==== Altering diacritics (Emendations) ====
De Blois (2003) is of the opinion that "the possibility of repointing affords virtually limitless opportunities to reinterpret the scripture". King (2009) counters this saying this "is not as such an argument against that procedure which is generally accepted as a valid one in, e.g., the textual criticism of the Hebrew scriptures."^{:72}

Corriente (2003) is "occasionally accepting, more often sceptical, sometimes scathing" on individual readings.^{:72}

The Berlin Institute for Advanced Study organized a conference on Luxenberg's work in 2004. "Luxenberg's methodology was generally deemed incomplete [but] a consensus seems to have been reached that the interventions Luxenberg makes in the texts must be scrutinized individually".

Baasten (2004) is very positive on individual readings: "in many instances he makes a convincing case".^{:272}

Stewart (2007) writes:

"Luxenberg is not alone in proposing emendations of the Qur’anic text. Many emendations are reported in medieval works of Qur’anic philology, [such as compiled in Al-Suyuti's Al-Itqan, however,] only a handful of scholars in Qur’anic studies since Nöldeke and Goldziher have devoted serious attention to emendation of the text. Among them the most prominent is undoubtedly James A. Bellamy, who, in seven articles dating from 1973 to 2002, proposed 29 emendations of the Qur’anic text as well as dozens of emendations of the muqatta‘at. . . . The results are varied. Many of the medieval emendations presented by al-Suyuti seem plausible and in some cases very probable. Many of Bellamy’s proposed emendations are highly unlikely, but a few are excellent proposals that provide improved readings. How does Luxenberg compare with his predecessors in the project of Qur’anic emendation? All told, Luxenberg proposes hundreds of emendations to the text of the Qur'an [..] Most of Luxenberg’s emendations are implausible and often demonstrably wrong. A small number of proposed emendations is likely or merits further consideration."^{:230-7}

Stewart (2007) furthermore notes: "Whatever the merits of Luxenberg's work, reactions that have deprecated it simply because he dares to emend the Qur'anic text are disappointing. Scholars of the Qur'an, if they are worthy of the name, should be able to advance arguments regarding the probability or improbability of the specific emendations Luxenberg has proposed rather than simply crying foul."

Stewart (2007) considers many of emendations "based purely on Arabic readings and not at all on the supposed Syriac Vorlage".^{:74}

Donner (2007) writes that "While some reviewers have harshly criticized a few of his emendations, the majority of them remain to be tested".

Böwering (2007): "it cannot be overlooked that, generally speaking, Semitic roots invite creative tinkering and that one can offer alternate explanations for Luxenberg's readings by manipulating roots in Hebrew, Ethiopic or Syriac in comparison with Arabic".^{:78}

El-Badawi (2014) reports that "some scholars equally skeptical about the Qur’ān’s origins have gravitated towards Luxenberg's approach",^{:29} referring to: Sawma (2006), Kropp (2008) and Van Reeth (2008).

Zellentin (2019) writes that "a few scholars find the method of reconstituting words based on the Qur'anic rasm (i.e. the consonantal skeleton of the Qur'an, without i'jam pointing) a worthwhile exercise, see e.g. Munther Younes". Furthermore, Zellentin (2019) considers Younes' reconstructions as "much more reasonable and sound, linguistically as well as culturally, than those of Lüling and Luxenberg".^{:184}

==== Written transmission ====
Corriente (2003) has strenuous objections to the thesis of a non-oral transmission.

Donner (2007) suggests there is evidence to support Luxenberg's hypothesis of a time of only written transmission, which is required to explain why Quran interpreters did not realise they were reading Syriac passages and the pronunciation Luxenberg attempts to reconstruct with his orthographic procedure (y for a):

"there is mounting evidence that the Qur’an text, or parts of it at least, must at some stage in its history have been transmitted in purely written form, without the benefit of a controlling tradition of active recitation. This evidence takes the form of recognizing in the Qur’anic text misunderstood words, hypercorrected words (the “lectio facilior”), or stray marks which then became incorporated into the recitation, something that could only happen if the oral recitation were derived from the written text rather than the other way around" "Recent work on the word furqan provides another case in which the written, not oral, transmission of the text is implied by the evidence."^{:40-41}

King (2009) considers Corriente's arguments lacking and "a case of pleading on the basis of what must have been". Rather, Luxenberg's more successful emendations seem to lend support to the idea of an early textual transmission of the Quran.^{:71} King considers this even further supported on other grounds when reading F. Donner (2007) alongside U. Rabbin (2009).

=== Response from Luxenberg ===
In response to criticism, Luxenberg (2007) argues that a historical-linguistic mistake was made in academia by assuming that Arabic is closer to proto-Semitic than Aramaic is, an assumption that served to cover up contradictions in the theory of the development of the Arabic language.^{:357}^{:12} Thus, much of what is called Classical Arabic is actually "of Aramaic derivation". Luxenberg claims that: "This makes understandable much of the criticism, even from competent Semiticists who have expressed their opinions on individual findings in the course of the debate that this study has provoked ... since its fırst appearance in 2000".^{:12}

== Editions ==
First published in German in 2000 (311 pp.), a revised and enlarged second German edition appeared in 2004 (340 pp.),^{:77} a third edition in 2007 (356 pp.),^{:21} a fourth in 2011/2012, and a fifth by 2015 (355 pp.). The 2007 English edition is based on the first German edition and, in part, the second German edition plus minor supplements and new findings.^{:123}^{:9} These later editions had cosmetic changes and more extensive footnotes^{:237} and some additional discussion of the work of other academics,^{:73} but "did not remove, modify, or defend more adequately any of the specific propositions Luxenberg had made earlier. They remained essentially the same as the first edition".^{:21}

== See also ==
Syriac language influence

- Alphonse Mingana

Syriac Christian influence

- Arthur Jeffery
- Tor Andræ
- Richard Bell

Judeo-Christian subtext

- Günter Lüling

Bible usage in Quran exegesis

- Muslim Hebraists
- Ibn Barrajan
- Ibrahim ibn Umar al-Biqa'i

Emending diacritics

- Al-Suyuti's Al-Itqan (Section 41: "On Knowing the Correct Syntactic Construal of the Text", summarising hundreds of monographs over the preceding seven centuries)
- Theodor Nöldeke
- Ignác Goldziher
- Jakob Barth
- James A. Bellamy
- Günter Lüling

Obscurity in Quran

- Criticism of the Quran: Obscure words and phrases
- Michael Cook
- Devin J. Stewart
- Shawkat Toorawa
- Toby Lester
- Behnam Sadeghi

Critical approach

- Revisionist school of Islamic studies
- Criticism of the Quran

Amateur discoverers (assuming Luxenberg is no professional)

- Michael Ventris
- Schliemann
