= Oriental Manuscripts of the Leipzig University Library =

Manuscript collection

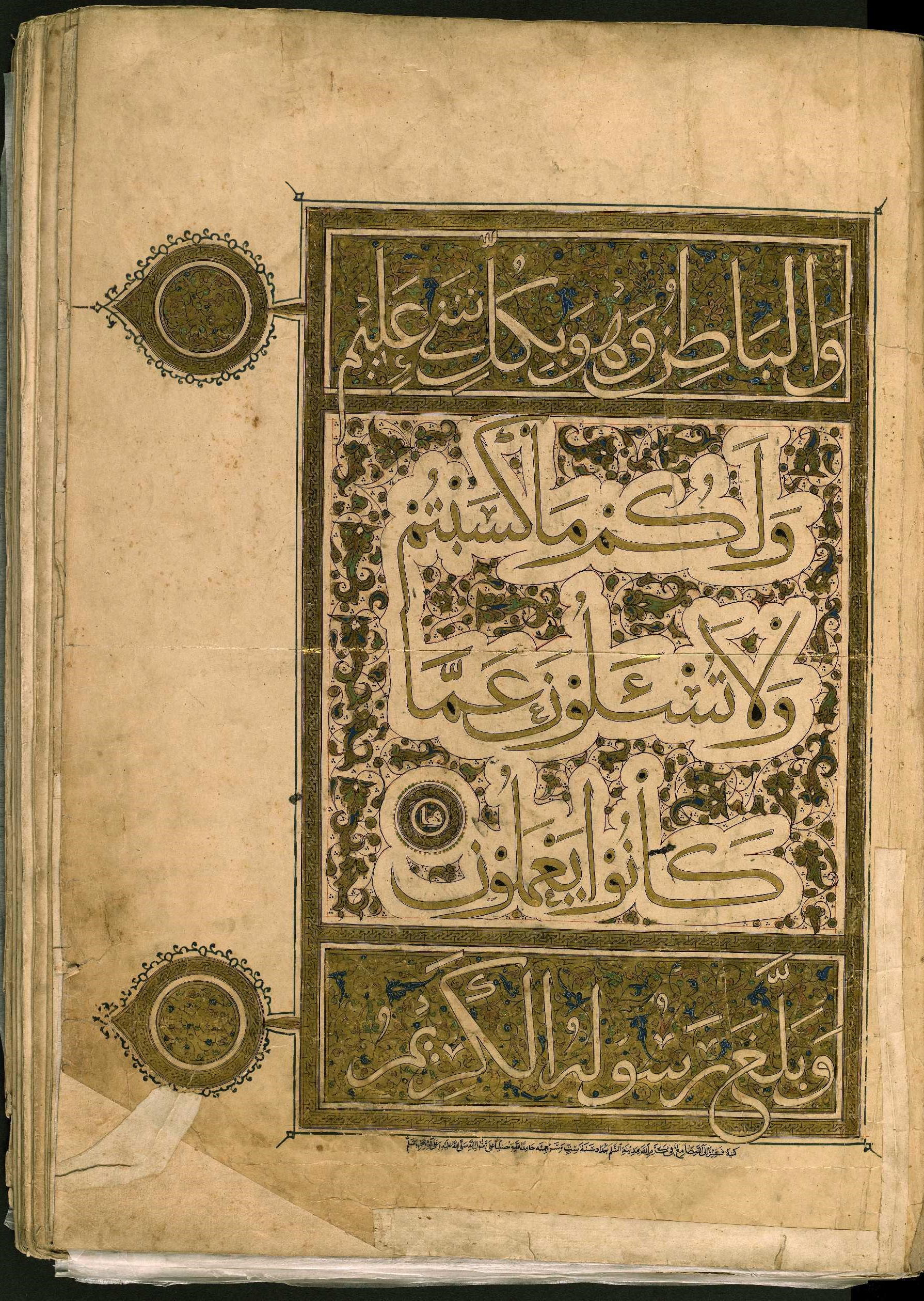
Two illuminated Koran verses. Öljaitü's Koran from Baghdad in the Oriental Manuscripts of the Leipzig University Library.

The Oriental Manuscripts of the Leipzig University Library are around 3,200 oriental manuscripts in the Leipzig University Library in Leipzig, Germany. 1,690 of them come from Islam-influenced areas (but not all of them have Islam content) and were written between the 10th and 18th centuries in Arabic, Persian and Ottoman Turkish.

== Inventory ==
This collection includes around 100 Koran manuscripts, the oldest of which date from the 14th century. There is also a completely preserved family library from Damascus called "Refaiya" with 458 volumes, most of which were created in the 14th and 15th centuries and cover a wide range of topics. The numerous owner and reader notes are of particular academic interest here. Other valuable pieces in the Leipzig collection include a collection of diwans (poem collections) by the poets Abū Ṭālib ʿAbd Manāf, Abu al-Aswad ad-Du'ali and Suhaim from the year 990, part of a magnificent Koran for the Ilkhan Öljaitü, a fragment of the Kitab az-Zina ("Book of the Ornament") by the Ismaili Abu Hatim Ahmad ibn Hamdan al-Razi, which is probably one of the oldest surviving Ismaili manuscripts ever, and an inscribed talismanic shirt from the Ottoman period. There are also workbooks and drafts by important orientalists from the 17th to 19th centuries such as Johann Jakob Reiske, Gustav Leberecht Flügel, Heinrich Leberecht Fleischer and Joseph von Hammer-Purgstall.

== History ==
The first holdings came to Leipzig as booty from the Turks in the 17th century. In 1840 and 1857/58, respectively, manuscripts and collections of excerpts were acquired from the possessions of the orientalists Ernst Friedrich Karl Rosenmüller and Joseph von Hammer-Purgstall. At the instigation of the Prussian consul in Damascus, Johann Gottfried Wetzstein, and the Leipzig Arabist Heinrich Leberecht Fleischer, the library of the Damascus ar-Rifāʿī family was purchased in 1853. All of these holdings were catalogued by Karl Vollers in 1906. By the Second World War, around 150 Islamic manuscripts had been added. In 1962, the acquisition of manuscripts from the Leipzig City Library brought a further 376 volumes, although these had already been catalogued by H. L. Fleischer in 1838. In 1995/96, almost 60 manuscripts were purchased in Amman. The cataloging of this last group took place between 2006 and 2008 as part of the German Research Foundation-funded “Pilot project for the database-supported indexing and digital provision of the newly acquired Arabic, Persian and Turkish manuscripts of the Leipzig University Library”. A follow-up project from 2008 to 2012 is devoted to the recording and research of the Refaiya collection.

The holdings in other Eastern languages currently include 1,560 East Asian volumes, mainly Indian, but also Tibetan and Batak manuscripts. In addition, there are 60 Hebrew and 30 manuscripts in Syriac, Coptic, Ethiopian, Amharic and Georgian.

== Bibliography ==
=== In German ===
- Aufrecht, Theodor: Katalog der Sanskrit-Handschriften der Universitäts-Bibliothek zu Leipzig. Leipzig 1901.
- Döring, Detlef: Der Erwerb der Refaiya-Handschriften durch die sächsische Regierung im Jahre 1853. In: Reuschel, Wolfgang (Hrsg.): Orientalistische Philologie und Arabische Linguistik. In: Asien-Afrika-Lateinamerika, Sonderheft 2 (1990), S. 19–23.
- Fleischer, H. L.: Die Refaiya. In: ZDMG 8 1854, S. 573–584.
- Fleischer, H. L./Delitzsch, F.: Codices Orientalium Linguarum descripserunt H. L. Fleischer et F. Delitzsch. Grimma 1938 (Reprint Osnabrück 1985).
- Klemm, Verena (Hrsg.): Ein Garten im Ärmel. Islamische Buchkultur. Katalog zur gleichnamigen Ausstellung in der Bibliotheca Albertina. Leipzig 2008.
- Liebrenz, Boris (2008). Arabische, Persische und Türkische Handschriften in Leipzig. Geschichte ihrer Sammlung und Erschließung von den Anfängen bis zu Karl Vollers (in German). Leipzig: Leipziger Universitätsverlag.
- Müller, Gisela: Orientalische Handschriften. In: Debes, Dietmar (Hg.): Zimelien. Bücherschätze der Universitäts-Bibliothek Leipzig. Leipzig 1988, S. 139–176.
- Vollers, Karl: Katalog der islamischen, christlich-orientalischen, jüdischen und samaritanischen Handschriften der Universitäts-Bibliothek zu Leipzig. Leipzig 1906 (Nachdruck Osnabrück 1975).
