= James A. Bellamy =

American professor (1925–2015)

- Born: 1925
- Died: July 21, 2015 (aged 89–90)

Academic work
- Discipline: Islamology
- Institutions: University of Michigan
- Main interests: Arabic and Islamic religious texts
- Notable works: "The Mysterious Letters of the Koran: Old Abbreviations of the Basmalah". Journal of the American Oriental Society. 93 (3): 267–285. Jul–Sep 1973. doi:10.2307/599460. JSTOR 599460.

James A. Bellamy (1925 – July 21, 2015) was an American professor and a scholar of Quranic studies. He was Professor Emeritus of Arabic Literature at the University of Michigan. He obtained a first position there in 1959 and became full professor in 1968.

== Research ==
Bellamy has been an important scholar in the textual criticism of the Quran, even being described as the "doyen" of its emendation, and one of the few to practice emendation since Ignác Goldziher and Theodor Nöldeke. In a series of articles from 1973 to 2002 in the Journal of the American Oriental Society, Bellamy proposed a number of conjectural emendations to the standard text of the Quran. Bellamy described textual criticism as like an "addiction" to him. He gave a succinct description of his job as "the correction of errors in texts."

Bellamy's approach makes him a representative of the Revisionist School of Islamic Studies. He is famous for, among others, having suggested to explain the muqattaʿat as deformed abbreviations of the basmalah.

== Select publications ==
- "The Mysterious Letters of the Koran: Old Abbreviations of the Basmalah". Journal of the American Oriental Society. 93 (3): 267–285. Jul–Sep 1973. doi:10.2307/599460. JSTOR 599460.
- Bellamy, James A.. “Arabic Names in the Chanson De Roland: Saracen Gods, Frankish Swords, Roland's Horse, and the Olifant.” Journal of the American Oriental Society 107 (1987): 267. |jstor=602835
- "Some Proposed Emendations to the Text of the Koran". Journal of the American Oriental Society. 113 (4): 562–573. Oct–Dec 1993. doi:10.2307/606724. JSTOR 606724.
- "More Proposed Emendations to the Text of the Koran". Journal of the American Oriental Society. 116 (2): 196–204. Apr–Jun 1996. doi:10.2307/605695. JSTOR 605695.
- "Textual Criticism of the Koran". Journal of the American Oriental Society. 121 (1): 1–6. Jan–Mar 2001. doi:10.2307/606724. JSTOR 606724.
- "A Further Note on ʿĪsā". Journal of the American Oriental Society. 122 (3): 587–588. Jul–Sep 2002. doi:10.2307/3087526. JSTOR 3087526.
- McAuliffe, Jane Dammen, ed. (2006). "Textual Criticism of the Qurʼān". Encyclopedia of the Qur'ān. Vol. 5. Brill. pp. 237–252.
