= Cornelia Horn =

German American theologian and historian

Cornelia Bernadette Horn (born October 14, 1968) is a German-American theologian, historian and philologist who specializes in the study of Early Christianity and pre-modern Christianity with a focus on Southwestern Asia and Northeastern Africa, also known as Oriental Christianity. Her work has examined theological, cultural, and historical questions in the areas of history, philology, art, childhood, women, and health in Early Christianity and specifically in the churches of Northeast Africa, the Middle East, and the Caucasus. Her work has dealt with Christian Apocrypha and the transmission history of traditions across Judaism, Christianity, and Islam, including the question of Christian apocryphal sources in the Quran and early Islam.

== Early life and education ==
Cornelia Horn was born in Hardheim to Christa (born Teichmann) and Johann Albert Horn and grew up on the family farm in Steinbach, Main-Tauber-Kreis, Baden-Württemberg, the oldest of three children.

Upon completing her Abitur at the Dietrich Bonhoeffer Gymnasium in Wertheim am Main, she studied classical philology, theology, philosophy, Oriental Christian languages, Church history, art History, and computer-aided linguistic text analysis in Germany (University of Würzburg), Liechtenstein, the University of Fribourg in Switzerland and the University of Texas at Austin. In 2001 she received a PhD from the Catholic University of America with a thesis on the life and theology of 5th century bishop, ascetic, and theologian Peter the Iberian, under the supervision of Sidney H. Griffith. Horn was awarded her cumulative habilitation in 2011 at the Eberhard Karl University of Tübingen under Professor Stephen Gerö with work on literary, cultural, and historical questions on women and children from the Christian Orient and work on the reception of Peter the Iberian in the context of Palestinian Christianity and Christianity in the Caucasus.

== Career ==
From 2004 to 2012, Horn was an assistant professor at Saint Louis University. On September 20, 2016, a jury in the City of Saint Louis, Missouri found Saint Louis University had denied her tenure illegally, having discriminated against her on the basis of her gender. In 2013, Horn received a scholarship from the Alexander von Humboldt Foundation to continue her research at both the Humboldt University of Berlin and the University of Regensburg. In 2014, the German Research Foundation awarded Horn a heisenberg Scholarship through the Heisenberg Programme and she continued her work at the FU Berlin. The German Research Foundation, in cooperation with the Martin Luther University, transferred this Heisenberg Scholarship to a Heisenberg Professorship for Languages and Cultures of the Christian Orient at the Martin Luther University Halle-Wittenberg on October 1, 2016, and in 2019, this professorship was incorporated into the university's permanent structure. Since then she has been the Professor of Languages and Cultures of the Christian Orient and is the Chair of Oriental Christian and Byzantine Studies at the Department of the Christian Orient and Byzantium at the Oriental Institute of the Martin Luther University Halle-Wittenberg (MLU). From April 1, 2017, to March 31, 2021, she was managing director of the Oriental Institute at MLU. Since January, 2023 she is the director of the [Mesrop Center for Armenian Studies, which recently celebrated its 25th anniversary. She is an external member of the Saxon Academy of Sciences and Humanities in Leipzig.

== Personal life ==
Horn is married and is the mother of two children. She resides in Berlin, Germany. She is active in the Roman Catholic parish of St. Konrad in Schöneberg.

== Selected books ==
- Asceticism and Christological controversy in fifth-century Palestine. The career of Peter the Iberian. The Oxford Early Christian Studies Series. Oxford et alibi: Oxford University Press, 2006. ISBN 978-0-19-927753-7
- with Robert R. Phenix Jr.: John Rufus: The Lives of Peter the Iberian, Theodosius of Jerusalem, and the Monk Romanus. Edited and translated with an introduction and notes. Writings from the Greco-Roman World 24. Atlanta, Georgia: Society of Biblical Literature and E. J. Brill Publishers, 2008. Pp. xcii + 370. ISBN 978-90-04-14686-0 (cloth; Brill Academic); ISBN 978-1-58983-200-8 (paperback; SBL).
- with John W. Martens: “Let the Little Children Come to Me”: Childhood and Children in Early Christianity. Washington, DC: Catholic University of America Press, 2009. Pp. xiii + 438. ISBN 978-0-8132-1674-4 ISBN 978-0-8132-1674-4 (paperback).
- with Robert Phenix, eds.: Children in Late Ancient Christianity. Studien und Texten zu Antike und Christentum 58. Tübingen: Mohr Siebeck, 2009. ISBN 978-3-16-150235-4
- with Geoffrey B. Greatrex and Robert Phenix, with contributions to the introduction by Sebastian Brock and Witold Witakowski: The Chronicle of Pseudo-Zachariah Rhetor. Church and War in Late Antiquity. Translated Texts for Historians 55. Liverpool, UK: Liverpool University Press, 2011. ISBN 978-1-84631-493-3
- ed.: The Bible, the Qur'an, & their Interpretation. Syriac Perspectives. Eastern Mediterranean Texts and Contexts 1. Warwick, Rhode Island: Abelian Academic, 2013. ISBN 978-0-615-78504-2
- with Tʻamar Nucʻubiże, Alexey Ostrovsky, and Basil Lourié, eds.: Georgian Christian Thought and its Cultural Context. Memorial Volume for the 125th Anniversary of Shalva Nutsubidze (1888–1969). Texts and Studies in Eastern Christianity 2. Leiden/Boston: Brill, 2014. ISBN 978-90-04-26427-4
- with Rita Stephan and Guita Hourani, eds.: “In Line with the Divine”: The Struggle for Gender Equality in Lebanon. Gender, Religion, & History [GRH] 1. Warwick, Rhode Island: Abelian Academic, 2015. Pp. xvi + 294. ISBN 978-0-692-47227-9
- with Sidney H. Griffith, eds.: Biblical and Qur’ānic Traditions in the Middle East. Eastern Mediterranean Texts and Contexts [EMTC] 2. Warwick, Rhode Island: Abelian Academic, an imprint of The Abelian Group, 2016. Pp. xx + 320. ISBN 978-0-692-60975-0 (paperback).
- with Robert Phenix: The Rabbula Corpus. Comprising the Life of Rabbula, His Correspondence, a Homily Delivered in Constantinople, Canons, and Hymns. Edition of the Syriac and Latin texts, English translation, and Introduction with notes to the Corpus Rabbulae. Writings from the Greco-Roman World 17. Atlanta, Georgia: Society of Biblical Literature; and Leiden: Brill Publishers, 2017. Pp. 768. ISBN 978-1-58983-127-8
- with Reidar Aasgaard, eds., with the assistance of Oana Maria Cojocaru: Childhood in History: Perceptions of Children in the Ancient and Medieval Worlds. London and New York: Routledge, 2017. Pp. xiv + 383. ISBN 978-1-4724-6892-5
- with Basil Lourié, Alexey Ostrovsky, and Bernard Outtier, eds.: Armenia between Byzantium and the Orient: Celebrating the Memory of Karen Yuzbashyan (1927-2009). Texts and Studies in Eastern Christianity 16. Leiden and Boston: Brill, 2020.
- with Robert Phenix: Strategius of Mar Saba. On the Captivity of Jerusalem by the Persians in 614 CE: The First Full English Translation of the Georgian Witness with Selected Greek, Armenian, and Arabic Parallels. Eastern Mediterranean Texts and Contexts 4; Georgian Texts and Studies 1. Chesterfield, Missouri, USA: Abelian Academic. An Imprint of The Abelian Group, 2022. ISBN 978-1-950116-00-3 (paperback), ISBN 978-1-950116-01-0 (hardcover).
- with Balbina Bäbler, eds.: Word and Space Interacting In Palestine in Late Antiquity. Towards a History of Pluridimensionality. Eastern Mediterranean Texts and Contexts 5. Chesterfield, Missouri, USA: Abelian Academic. An Imprint of The Abelian Group, 2023. ISBN 978-1-950116-03-4 (hardcover black-and-white), ISBN 978-1-950116-06-5 (hardcover color).
- with Robert Phenix: Fifty-One Armenian Antiphons Attributed to Ephraem the Syrian: The First Complete English Translation of the Armenian Text with Comments on the Syriac Vorlage. Eastern Mediterranean Texts and Contexts 6; Armenian Texts and Studies 1. Chesterfield, Missouri, USA: Abelian Academic. An Imprint of The Abelian Group, 2024. ISBN 978-1-950116-07-2 (paperback), ISBN 978-1-950116-08-9 (hardcover).
