= Karl Vollers =

German orientalist (1857–1909)

Karl Vollers (March 19, 1857 – January 5, 1909) was a German orientalist.

Vollers was born in Hooksiel, in the Grand Duchy of Oldenburg. He went to school in Hildesheim and Jever where he received his high-school degree Abitur in 1875. Vollers studied Protestant theology and Oriental languages in Tübingen, Halle, Berlin, and Strassburg. He graduated in 1879. From fall 1879 to July 1880 he worked as a private teacher in Constantinople. In 1880 he received the licentia docendi for theology in Jena.

His first professional appointment as teacher at a local gymnasium (high-school) in Fürstenwalde in Saxony, where he served between October 1881 to 1882. After the defense of his PhD thesis at Halle University he was appointed assistant at the Royal Library in Berlin in October 1882 under the directorship of Carl Lepsius.

In 1886, he was appointed director of the Khedival Library in Cairo, a position held by several German orientalists before World War I. He earned his reputation as dialectologist by writing one of the first studies on Egyptian contemporary language. Here he could gather the material for his later research. He served in Cairo until September 1896. In 1896 he returned to Germany and accepted a position as professor for Oriental languages at the School of Philosophy at Jena University and director of the "Grand Ducal Oriental Coin Cabinet Jena". In 1906, he catalogued the Oriental Manuscripts of the Leipzig University Library.

After disputes, which became personal, over his book Volksprache und Schriftsprache im alten Arabien (1906), Vollers left the Deutsche Morgenländische Gesellschaft in 1908. He died shortly afterwards.

== Bibliography (selection) ==
- Das Dodekapropheton der Alexandriner (2 volumes, 1880–1882)
- Pentateuchus Samaritanus III-V (1883–1891)
- Lehrbuch der aegypto-arabischen Umgangssprache (1890)
- Fragmente aus dem Mugrib des Ibn Sa'id (1894)
- Die Gedichte des Mutalammis arabisch und deutsch (1903)
- Katalog der islamischen, christlich-orientalischen, jüdischen und samaritanìschen Handschriften der Universitätsbibliotek zu Leipzig (1906)
- Volksprache und Schriftsprache im alten Arabien (1906)
