= Siegmund Fraenkel (Semitist) =

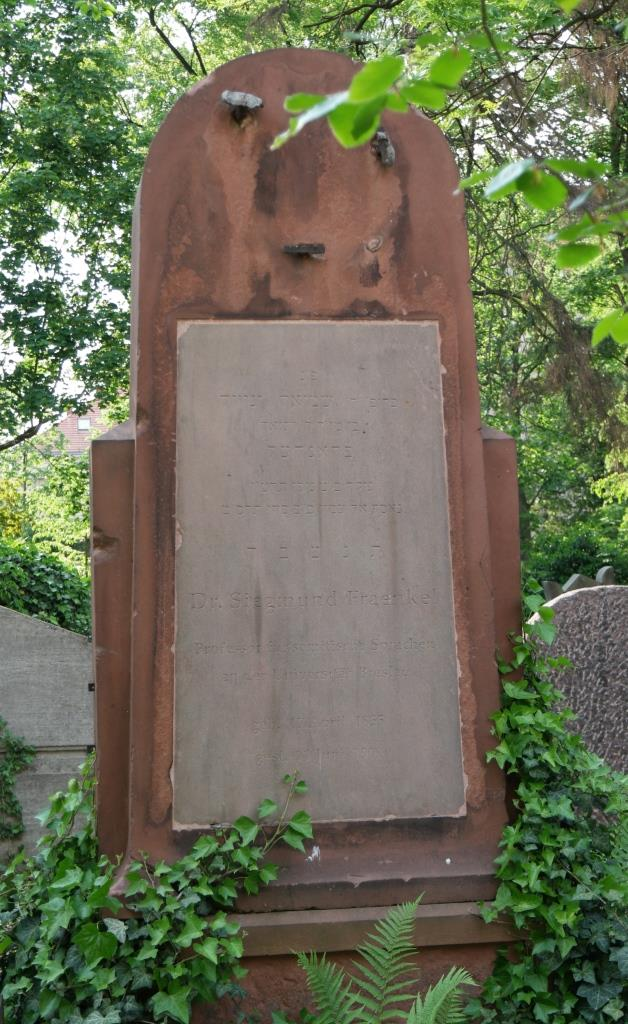
Grave of Siegmund Fraenkel in the Old Jewish Cemetery in Breslau

Siegmund Fraenkel (* 7 April 1855 in Frankfurt (Oder); † 11 June 1909 in Breslau) was a German Semitist.
