= Emran El-Badawi =

Scholar of Quranic studies

Emran El-Badawi is a scholar of Quranic studies. He is dean of the College of Liberal & Fine Arts at the Tarleton State University.

== Biography ==
=== Early life and education ===
El-Badawi earned his doctorate in Near Eastern Languages and Civilizations and a master's degree from the University of Chicago. He also holds a master's degree in religion from Temple University and a bachelor's degree in computer science, with a major in religion, from Rutgers University.

=== Career ===
El-Badawi taught Arabic at the University of Chicago from 2006 to 2010 and served as a lecturer in religion at Temple University from 2003 to 2005.

He also chaired the Department of Modern and Classical Languages at the University of Houston as Associate Professor and Program Director of Middle Eastern Studies.

== Works ==
- The Qur'an and the Aramaic Gospel Traditions (2013)
- Queens and Prophets: How Arabian Noblewomen and Holy Men Shaped Paganism, Christianity and Islam (2022)
- Female Divinity in the Qur’an: In Conversation with the Bible and the Ancient Near East (2024)
