= Why I Am Not a Muslim =

1995 book by Ibn Warraq

- Author: Ibn Warraq
- Language: English
- Subject: Islam
- Publisher: Prometheus Books
- Publication date: May 1995
- Publication place: United States
- Media type: Print (Hardcover and Paperback)
- Pages: 294 pp
- ISBN: 0-87975-984-4
- OCLC: 32088699
- Dewey Decimal: 297 20
- LC Class: BP169 .I28 1995
- Followed by: The Origins of The Koran: Classic Essays on Islam's Holy Book

Why I Am Not a Muslim, a book written by Ibn Warraq, is a critique of Islam and the Qur'an. It was first published by Prometheus Books in the United States in 1995. The title of the book is a homage to Bertrand Russell's essay, Why I Am Not a Christian, in which Russell criticizes the religion in which he was raised.

== Motive and contents ==
Outraged over the fatwa and death threats against Salman Rushdie, Ibn Warraq assumes a pseudonym to write what the historian and writer Daniel Pipes called "serious and thought-provoking book" using a "scholarly sledgehammer" approach to "demolish" Islam. Warraq claims the work is his contribution ('my war effort') in the struggle against the kinds of people who would want to murder Rushdie.

The author's "polemic" criticizes Islam's mythology, theology, historic achievements, and current cultural influence. Warraq, drawing largely on previous research, provides what English philosopher Antony Flew called an "invaluable compilation" of Islam's shortcomings. Flew wrote that the book "makes a compelling case" that Islam is "flatly incompatible" with "individual rights and liberties of a modern liberal, democratic, secular state". According to Warraq, one either has to believe that the Qur'an is the word of God, or that Muhammad was a liar. Moreover, progress made in modern critical scholarship of the Bible has serious and possibly detrimental consequences for belief in the inerrancy of the Qur'an once it is subjected to the same type of scholarly criticism.

== Reviews ==
Dutch Arabist Hans Jansen noted that 'it is remarkable that in this first book, Ibn Warraq makes no distinction at all between 'normal' Islam and Islamic fundamentalism. Both oppose the freedom of expression with all their might.' Jansen wondered whether the criticism of Islam that Warraq, Rushdie and other British–Indian writers such as V.S. Naipaul and Arun Shourie displayed was perhaps so 'ruthless' – compared to the much milder approach commonly adopted by Judaeo-Christian writers – because of vestiges of 'Hindu prejudices', or because these authors felt no inhibition to scrutinise a fellow Abrahamic religion.

== See also ==
- Apostasy in Islam
- Criticism of Islam
- Leaving Islam: Apostates Speak Out

== Editions ==
- Prometheus Books (hardcover), 1995, ISBN 0-87975-984-4
- (French) Age d'homme, (1999), ISBN 2-8251-1259-3
- (Persian), 2000
- Prometheus Books (paperback), 2003, ISBN 1-59102-011-5
- (Spanish) Ediciones del Bronce, Barcelona, 2003 ISBN 84-8453-146-5
- (Danish) Lindhardt og Ringhof, 2004, ISBN 87-595-2065-5
