= What the Koran Really Says =

2002 book by Ibn Warraq

What the Koran Really Says: Language, Text and Commentary
- Author: Ibn Warraq
- Language: English
- Subject: Quran
- Genre: Islamic history
- Publisher: Prometheus Books
- Publication date: October 2002
- Publication place: United States
- Media type: Print (Hardcover, Paperback), E-book
- Pages: 782
- ISBN: 978-1573929455
- OCLC: 633722447

What the Koran Really Says: Language, Text and Commentary (2002) is a book edited by Ibn Warraq and published by Prometheus Books. The book is a collection of classical essays, some translated for the first time, that provide commentary on the traditions and language of the Koran, discussing its grammatical and logical discontinuities, its Syriac and Hebrew foreign vocabulary, and its possible Christian, Coptic and Qumranic sources. The title is taken from German author Manfred Barthel's 1980 book Was wirklich in der Bibel steht ("What the Bible Really Says").

Within the book is an article written by Gerd R. Puin titled "Observations on Early Qur'an Manuscripts in Sana'a". Professor Puin is a German scholar and an authority on Qur'anic historical orthography, the study and scholarly interpretation of ancient manuscripts, and a specialist in Arabic calligraphy. Professor Puin was the head of a restoration project, commissioned by the Yemeni government, which spent a significant amount of time examining the ancient Qur'anic manuscripts discovered in Sana'a, Yemen, in 1972. In an article in the 1999 Atlantic Monthly, Puin is quoted as saying that:

My idea is that the Koran is a kind of cocktail of texts that were not all understood even at the time of Muhammad. Many of them may even be a hundred years older than Islam itself. Even within the Islamic traditions there is a huge body of contradictory information, including a significant Christian substrate; one can derive a whole Islamic anti-history from them if one wants.

The Koran claims for itself that it is 'mubeen', or 'clear', but if you look at it, you will notice that every fifth sentence or so simply doesn't make sense. Many Muslims—and Orientalists—will tell you otherwise, of course, but the fact is that a fifth of the Koranic text is just incomprehensible. This is what has caused the traditional anxiety regarding translation. If the Koran is not comprehensible—if it can't even be understood in Arabic—then it's not translatable. People fear that. And since the Koran claims repeatedly to be clear but obviously is not—as even speakers of Arabic will tell you—there is a contradiction. Something else must be going on.

== Included papers ==
=== Introduction ===
- Ibn Warraq, Introduction
- Toby Lester (1999), What is the Koran?

=== Background ===
- Yehuda D. Nevo (1994), Towards a Prehistory of Islam

=== A Question of Language ===
- Alphonse Mingana (1927), Syriac Influence on the Style of the Koran
- D. S. Margoliouth (1939), Some Additions to Professor Jeffery's "Foreign Vocabulary in the Qur'an"
- Paul E. Kahle (1949), The Arabic Readers of the Koran
- C. Rabin (1955), The Beginnings of Classical Arabic
- Joshua Blau (1963), The Role of the Bedouins as Arbiters in Linguistic Questions and the "Mas'ala Az-Zunburiyya"
- A. Ben-Shemesh (1969), Some Suggestions to Qur'an Translators

=== Sources of the Koran: Essenian, Christian, Coptic ===
- Ibn Warraq, Introduction to the Dead Sea Scrolls
- Eric R. Bishop (1958), The Qumran Scrolls and the Qur'an
- Marc Philonenko (1966), An Essenian Tradition in the Koran (translated from French by Ibn Warraq)
- Marc Philonenko (1967), A Qumranian Expression in the Koran (translated by Warraq)
- Wilson B. Bishai (1971), A Possible Coptic Source for a Qur'anic Text
- Ibn Warraq, Introduction to Raimund Kobert
- Raimund Kobert (1959), The Shahadat az-zur: The False Witness (translated from German by G. A. Wells)
- Raimund Kobert (1966), On the Meaning of the Three Final Words of Sura XXII. 30-31 (translated by Wells)
- Raimund Kobert (1986), Early and Later Exegesis of the Koran: a Supplement to Or 35 (translated by Wells)

=== Suras, Suras, Suras ===
- Ibn Warraq, Introduction to Sura IX.29
- Franz Rosenthal (1953), Some Minor Problems in the Qur'an
- Claude Cahen (1962), Koran IX.29 (translated by Warraq)
- Meir M. Bravmann and Claude Cahen (1963), A propos de Qur'an IX.29: Hatta Yu'tu L-Gizyata wa-hum Sagiruna
- Meir M. Bravmann (1967), The Ancient Background of the Koranic Concept al-Gizatu 'an Yadin
- M. J. Kister (1964), "An Yadin" (Qur'an IX.29): An Attempt at Interpretation
- Uri Rubin (1993), Koran and Tafsir: The Case of " 'an Yadin"
- C. Heger, Koran XXV.1: Al-Furqan and the "Warner"
- Michael Schub (1995), The Buddha Comes to China
- Michael Schub, The Secret Identity of Dhu L-Kifl

=== Emendations, Interpolations ===
- J. Barth (1916), Studies Contributing to Criticism and Exegesis of the Koran (translated by Wells)
- A. Fischer (1906), A Qur'anic Interpolation (translated by Herbert Berg)
- A. Fischer (1906), Regarding Qur'an CI.6 (translated by Berg)
- C.C. Torrey (1922), Three difficult passages in the Koran
- C.C. Torrey (1948), A Strange Reading in the Qur'an
- James A. Bellamy (1993), Some Proposed Emendations to the Text of the Koran

=== Richard Bell: Introduction and Commentary ===
- Ibn Warraq, Introduction to Richard Bell
- Richard Bell (1958), From Introduction to the Qur'an
- Richard Bell (1991), From A Commentary on the Qur'an

=== Poetry and the Koran ===
- Rudolf Geyer (1908), The Strophic Structure of the Koran (translated by Wells)
- Julius Wellhausen (1913), On the Koran (translated by Wells)
- Ibn Rawandi, On Pre-Islamic Christian Strophic Poetical Texts in the Koran: a Critical Look at the Work of Günter Lüling

=== Manuscripts ===
- Adolf Grohmann (1958), The Problem of Dating the Early Qur'ans
- Gerd R. Puin (1996), Observations on Early Qur'an Manuscripts in San'a'

== Reviews ==
In his review of the book, political scientist, anarchist, and "angry Arab" As'ad AbuKhalil states that Ibn Warraq collected old writings by Orientalists who have been long discredited and added that "the more rigid and biased the Orientalists, the better for Warraq".

Black Hills State University professor Ahrar Ahmad (2004) appreciated that this book and The Quest for the Historical Muhammad were "less abrasive [and Warraq's] tone less mocking" than in his earliest work, which Ahmad deemed less scholarly. He noted that "What the Koran Really Says has the ambitious objective to “desacralize” (...) the Arabic language, script, and scripture. He seems to think that simply placing Islam in the Middle Eastern milieu in terms of language, social influences, intellectual origins, or theological affinities with other religions and rituals is enough to question its authenticity." Ahmad wondered further how the etymology of the Quran's language could possibly "destroy its legitimacy and authority", believing that Warraq criticised positions nobody held.
