= The Origins of the Koran =

1998 book edited by Ibn Warraq

The Origins of the Koran: Classic Essays on Islam's Holy Book
- Author: Ibn Warraq
- Language: English
- Subject: Criticism of the Quran
- Genre: Islamic history
- Publisher: Prometheus Books
- Publication date: September 1, 1998
- Publication place: United States
- Media type: Print (Hardcover, Paperback), E-book
- Pages: 411
- ISBN: 978-1573921985
- OCLC: 475215080

The Origins of The Koran: Classic Essays on Islam’s Holy Book is a 1998 book edited by Ibn Warraq. It contains a collection of 13 critical studies of the Qur'an written over the past two centuries by historians and scholars of the Middle East: Ibn Warraq, Theodor Nöldeke, Leone Caetani, Alphonse Mingana, Arthur Jeffery, David Samuel Margoliouth, Abraham Geiger, William St. Clair Tisdall, Charles Cutler Torrey and Andrew Rippin. Most of these authors wrote their essays on the Qur'an before World War II (1939–1945).

The book examines widely held beliefs about the historical origins and sources of the Islamic holy book. It challenges the notion that the Qur'an is free of errors, a view held by most Muslims. Divided into four parts, the book presents an examination of the Qur'an. After an introduction in Part One, Part Two focuses on the difficulty of establishing a reliable Qur'anic text, while Part Three claims to detail the Jewish, Christian, and Zoroastrian sources of the Qur'an. Part Four attempts to disprove the historical reliability of the earliest Islamic sources.

== Reviews ==
Herbert Berg in his review from the Bulletin of the School of Oriental and African Studies summarized the essays lauding the inclusion of the essay by Theodor Nöldeke while panning the inclusion of William St. Clair Tisdall's as "not a particularly scholarly essay". He concluded "[i]t seems that Ibn Warraq has included some of the essays not on the basis of their scholarly value or their status as 'classics', but rather on the basis of their hostility to Islam. This does not necessarily diminish the value of the collection, but the reader should be aware that this collection does not fully represent classic scholarship on the Quran."

François de Blois criticized Ibn Warraq's work for including the essay by St. Clair Tisdall, describing it as a "shoddy piece of missionary propaganda" and the "worst" among the essays of the book. De Blois also indicated that there are "quite a few mistakes in the spelling of both of Arabic and of European languages" and added that "the fact that the piece of Qur'anic calligraphy reproduced on the front cover has been printed up-side down is not, presumably, an intentional insult to the editor's former co-religionists".

Christopher Melchert, a professor at the University of Oxford, said that the collection offered "a fair impression of European Qur’an studies in the first half of the twentieth century" but also believes that the sources that Warraq cites are better to be read first-hand.

Todd Lawson said regarding the book that "arrogance and amateurish assumptions abound; and all is sounded in the key of gormless hysteria...It must be said that it undoubtedly demonstrates the editor's diligence and industry in finding churlish things to say about the Qur'an in English. It is difficult to recommend this production, except perhaps for antiquarian interests and the archaeology of the study of Islam."

== See also ==
- Criticism of the Quran
