= Criticism of Islam =

Criticism of Islam can take many forms, including academic critiques, political criticism, religious criticism, and personal opinions. Subjects of criticism include Islamic beliefs, practices, and doctrines.

Criticism of Islam has been present since its formative stages, and early expressions of disapproval were made by Jews, Christians, and some former Muslims like Ibn al-Rawandi. Subsequently, the Muslim world itself faced criticism after the September 11 attacks.

Criticism of Islam has been aimed at the life of Muhammad, the central prophet of Islam, in both his public and personal lives. Issues relating to the authenticity and morality of the scriptures of Islam, both the Quran, the hadiths, and his personal life (such as the child marriage with Aisha) are also discussed by critics. Criticisms of Islam have also been directed at historical practices, such as the recognition of slavery as an institution as well as Islamic imperialism impacting native cultures. More recently, Islamic beliefs regarding human origins, predestination, God's existence, and God's nature have received criticism for perceived philosophical and scientific inconsistencies.

Other criticisms center on the treatment of individuals within modern Muslim-majority countries, including issues related to human rights in the Islamic world, particularly regarding the application of Islamic law called Sharia. As of 2025, 89 of the world's 195 countries (including non-Muslim countries) have anti-blasphemy laws, and 22 also have anti-apostasy laws. By 2017, 13 Muslim countries imposed the death penalty for apostasy or blasphemy.

Muslim scholars have historically responded to criticisms through apologetics and theological defenses of Islamic doctrines. Amid the contemporary embrace of multiculturalism, there has been criticism regarding how Islam may affect the willingness or ability of Muslim immigrants to assimilate in host nations.

== Historical background ==
Early Christian reactions to Islam, such as those by St. John of Damascus around fifty years after the Hijrah, were shaped by theological opposition and political conflict. According to Norman Daniel, John's depiction of Islam confused it with pre-Islamic paganism, associating Muslim practices with idol worship at the Ka'bah. Christian polemical writing at the time took an "unusually severe attitude" toward Islam, condemning whatever Muslims believed, even when it was partially correct according to Christian teaching. Daniel notes that the method used against Islam applied established Christian techniques of theological debate, often favoring aggressive refutation over genuine understanding. This early pattern of prejudice, Daniel argues, continued without dilution into later European Orientalist scholarship, influencing views of Islam well into the modern period. Medieval Muslim society also produced unorthodox voices—such as Ibn al-Rawandī and Abū Bakr al-Rāzī—whose radical critiques of prophecy provoked vigorous rebuttals from both theologians and philosophers, illustrating the period's lively culture of intellectual debate al-Ma'arri, an eleventh-century antinatalist and critic of all religions. His poetry was known for its "pervasive pessimism." He believed that Islam does not have a monopoly on truth. Apologetic writings, attributed to the philosopher Abd-Allah ibn al-Muqaffa (d. c. 756), include defenses of Manichaeism against Islam and critiques of the Islamic concept of God, characterizing the Quranic deity in highly critical terms. The Jewish philosopher Ibn Kammuna, criticized Islam, reasoning that Shari'a was incompatible with the principles of justice.

At the same time that dissenting voices like Ibn al-Rāwandī appeared, mainstream Muslim scholars were actively strengthening Islamic doctrine against both internal and external critiques. As Hodgson notes, a range of thinkers—including the traditionalist Aṯharīs, the Ashʿarīs, and the Māturīdīs—developed vigorous defenses of revelation, sometimes by strict adherence to transmitted texts, sometimes through rational systematization. Rather than avoiding controversy, they treated public debate as a responsibility, working to articulate an intellectually coherent and resilient Islamic worldview that Hodgson describes as one of the most creatively active climates of medieval history.

During the Middle Ages, Christian church officials commonly represented Islam as a Christian heresy or a form of idolatry. Daniel emphasizes that for much of the medieval period, Christian understanding of Islam was based more on inherited stereotypes and polemical tradition than on direct engagement with Muslim sources. They viewed Islam to be a material, rather than spiritual, religion and often explained it in apocalyptic terms. In the early modern period, some Christian thinkers shifted their critiques toward questions of political loyalty and religious authority. In A Letter Concerning Toleration (1689), the philosopher John Locke argued that Islam’s perceived fusion of religious and political authority—drawing in particular on the Ottoman Caliphate—raised concerns about whether Muslim subjects living under Christian governments could maintain undivided allegiance to the civil state. Locke contrasted this with Christian traditions that, in his view, distinguished ecclesiastical authority from civil governance.

In the eighteenth and nineteenth centuries, European academics often portrayed Islam as an exotic Eastern religion distinct from Western religions like Judaism and Christianity, sometimes classifying it as a "Semitic" religion. The term "Mohammedanism" was used by many to criticize Islam by focusing on Muhammad's actions, reducing Islam to merely a derivative of Christianity rather than acknowledging it as a successor of Abrahamic monotheisms. By contrast, many academics nowadays study Islam as an Abrahamic religion in relation to Judaism and Christianity. The Christian apologist G. K. Chesterton criticized Islam as a heresy or parody of Christianity, David Hume (d. 1776), both a naturalist and a sceptic, considered monotheistic religions to be more "comfortable to sound reason" than polytheism but also found Islam to be more "ruthless" than Christianity.

The Greek Orthodox bishop Paul of Antioch accepted Muhammed as a prophet, but did not consider his mission to be universal and regarded Christian law superior to Islamic law. Maimonides, a twelfth-century rabbi, did not question the strict monotheism of Islam, and considered Islam to be an instrument of divine providence for bringing all of humankind to the worship of the one true God, but was critical of the practical politics of Muslim regimes and considered Islamic ethics and politics to be inferior to their Jewish counterparts.

In his essay Islam Through Western Eyes, the cultural critic Edward Said suggests that the Western view of Islam is particularly hostile for a range of religious, psychological and political reasons, all deriving from a sense "that so far as the West is concerned, Islam represents not only a formidable competitor but also a late-coming challenge to Christianity." In his view, the general basis of Orientalist thought forms a study structure in which Islam is placed in an inferior position as an object of study, thus forming a considerable bias in Orientalist writings as a consequence of the scholars' cultural make-up.

== Points of criticism ==
=== The expansion of Islam ===
In an alleged dialogue between the Byzantine emperor Manuel II Palaiologos (r. 1391–1425) and a Persian scholar, the emperor criticized Islam as a faith spread by the sword. This reflected a common view in Europe during the Enlightenment period about Islam, then synonymous with the Ottoman Empire, as a bloody, ruthless, and intolerant religion. More recently, in 2006, a similar statement of Manuel II, (Note: "Show me just what Muhammad brought that was new, and there you will find things only evil and inhuman, such as his command to spread by the sword the faith he preached," he said.) quoted publicly by Pope Benedict XVI, prompted a negative response from Muslim figures who viewed the remarks as an insulting mischaracterization of Islam. In this vein, the Indian social reformer Pandit Lekh Ram (d. 1897) thought that Islam was grown through violence and desire for wealth, while the Nigerian author Wole Soyinka considers Islam as a "superstition" that it is mainly spread with violence and force.

This "conquest by the sword" thesis is opposed by many historians who consider the transregional development of Islam a multi-faceted phenomenon involving a range of political, social, and economic processes. The first wave of expansion, the migration of the early Muslims to Medina to escape persecution in Mecca and the subsequent conversion of Medina, was indeed peaceful. In the years to come, Muslims defended themselves against frequent Meccan incursions until Mecca's peaceful surrender in 630. By the time of Muhammed's death in 632, most Arabian tribes had formed political alliances with him and embraced Islam voluntarily, creating a foundation for future regional expansion. In the centuries that followed, Islam extended beyond Arabia through a combination of military conquests and non-military means. While the early Islamic empires expanded into Syria, Persia, and North Africa, Islam often remained a minority religion in those regions for several generations, a pattern that some scholars cite as evidence that political conquest did not inherently produce widespread religious conversion. (Note: Scholarly research suggests that there was an inverse relationship between where Muslim political power centres were and where the most conversions occurred, which was on the political periphery. According to the Encyclopaedia of Islam, conquest was just one of several elements that helped Islam spread throughout the world. The systematisation of Islamic tradition, trade, interfaith marriage, political patronage, urbanisation, and the pursuit of knowledge must also be acknowledged. Along trade routes and even in the most isolated regions, Sufis contributed to the spread of Islam. The yearly hajj to Mecca, which brought together scholars, mystics, businesspeople, and regular believers from various nations, should be particularly noted as a contributing factor. Despite taking on more contemporary forms, these factors are still in force today. The expansion of Islam into western Europe, the Americas, Australia, and New Zealand has been facilitated by them.)

In many regions outside the initial imperial sphere, particularly in Sub-Saharan Africa, Central Asia, and Southeast Asia, Islam spread primarily through trade, cultural integration, missionary activities, and conquests. Historian Marshall Hodgson writes that Islam became “a mass people’s religion on a wave of economic expansiveness,” as Muslim merchants and missionaries introduced the faith in commercial hubs and rural towns far removed from the centers of military power. These conversions were often voluntary and linked to the appeal of Islam's social order, legal institutions, and communal ethics.

=== Scripture ===
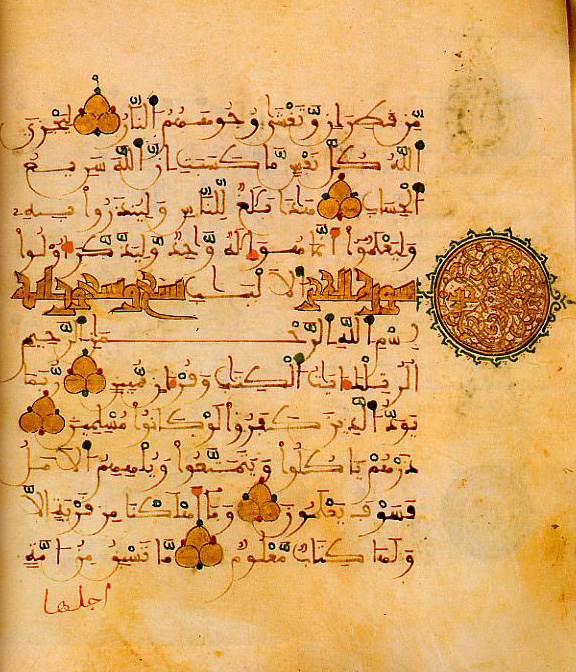
12th-century Andalusian Quran

In the lifetime of Muhammad, the Qur'an was primarily preserved orally, with various written fragments recorded by his companions. Some revisionist scholars argue that the complete compilation of the Qur'an in its current form occurred much later—possibly between 150 and 300 years after Muhammad's death. The standard Islamic view holds that the Qur'an was compiled shortly after the death of Muhammad in 632 and canonized during the caliphate of Uthman ibn Affan (r. 644–656). This position has been increasingly supported by manuscript evidence and recent scholarship. The Birmingham Qur'an, radiocarbon-dated to 568–645 CE, led Nicolai Sinai to conclude that a large portion of the Qurʾānic text was already in circulation by the 650s, and that late canonization theories such as Wansbrough's are now “safely ruled out.” Marijn van Putten likewise finds that early manuscripts share distinctive spelling patterns, indicating they descend from a single written source—likely the Uthmanic codex.

The Qur’an asserts its own inimitability and perfection, a claim that has been disputed by critics. One such criticism is that sentences about God in the Quran are sometimes followed immediately by those in which God is the speaker. The Iranian journalist Ali Dashti (d. 1982) criticized the Quran, saying that "the speaker cannot have been God" in certain passages. Similarly, the secular author Ibn Warraq gives Surah al-Fatiha as an example of a passage which is "clearly addressed to God, in the form of a prayer." However, scholars like Mustansir Mir and Michael Sells explain that these sudden shifts in speaker or pronouns—called iltifāt in Arabic—are a common and deliberate feature of classical Arabic style. They are used to keep the listener engaged, highlight key ideas, or mark a shift in tone. Mir shows how this technique strengthens the Qur’an's overall structure and rhythm, while Sells argues that it also reflects God's implied transcendence—by changing how God is referred to, the Qur’an avoids limiting Him to one fixed role or persona.

The Christian theologian Philip Schaff (d. 1893) praises the Quran for its poetic beauty, religious fervor, and wise counsel, but considers this mixed with "absurdities, bombast, unmeaning images, and low sensuality." The orientalist Gerd Puin believes that the Quran contains many verses which are incomprehensible, a view rejected by Muslims and many other orientalists. Apology of al-Kindy, a medieval polemical work, describes the narratives in the Quran as "all jumbled together and intermingled," and regards this as "evidence that many different hands have been at work therein." These criticisms often come from reading the Qur’an like a modern book, rather than as a message originally spoken aloud, according to some scholars. Scholars like Angelika Neuwirth explain that its sudden shifts in voice and repetition were not mistakes, but ways to hold attention and make meaning clearer to a live audience. Michael Sells points out that the Qur’an's rhythm and sound patterns were key to how it was understood, especially in the early chapters. And as Mustansir Mir and classical scholars like al-Jurjānī have shown, what may seem like abrupt changes in topic often reflect careful design, helping ideas flow and giving extra weight to key points.

==== Historical and scientific accuracy ====
Islamic theology views the study of the natural world as a religious duty, and early Muslim scholars refused to subordinate the Quran to a changing science. For Muslims, the Quran is a guide for theology, morality, and the relationship between humankind and God, which is compatible with the doctrine of Quranic inerrancy. Many scholars, Muslim and non-Muslim, hold that the Quran is not a science textbook, and that the claim that it contains "all knowledge, including scientific" knowledge is not a mainstream view in Muslim scholarship.

===== Dhu'l-Qarnayn =====
According to many historians, the story of Dhu al-Qarnayn has its origins in legends of Alexander the Great current in the Middle East, namely the Syriac Alexander Legend. From this derives the Quranic presentation of Dhu al-Qarnayn as a prophet-king who travels the world and calls for belief.

Many Muslim commentators have rejected the identification with Alexander on theological grounds, arguing that Dhu al-Qarnayn adhered to one God while Alexander was polytheistic; some identify him instead with Cyrus the Great. Others have questioned the dating and the missing elements in the supposed relationship between the Quran and the Syriac legend, and scholars have in turn responded to these objections. Some interpreters read the story allegorically (ta'wil), as a symbolic account of spiritual and ethical truths rather than a report of a historical ruler and an iron wall.

===== Cosmology =====
Many scholars hold that the Quran assumes a flat earth, as the text frequently emphasizes the extensiveness or flatness of the earth and how it has been spread out. By the 10th century, however, Muslim scholars had learned of Greek astronomical advances and reinterpreted the relevant verses to state that the Earth is spherical, while traditionalists who rejected Greek and Ptolemaic cosmology continued to hold the earlier view.

===== Creation and evolution =====
Like the Bible, the Quran talks about God creating the universe in six days. Some scholars argue that Quranic verses related to the origin of mankind created from dust or mud are not logically compatible with modern evolutionary theory.

===== Muslim perspectives =====
Muslim scholars have argued that passages on the natural world are meant to provoke reflection rather than to convey scientific knowledge, and that the Quran "does not interfere in the business of science". Muntasir Mir argues that a Quranic statement can have more than one layer of meaning, so that one layer is meaningful to one audience in one age and another layer, without negating the first, to a later audience. Nidhal Guessoum cautions that tying the Quran to mutable scientific theories risks harming the text's credibility, and Hamza Tzortzis argues that forcing a scientific reading on the text ignores its linguistic and historical context.

==== Pre-existing sources ====
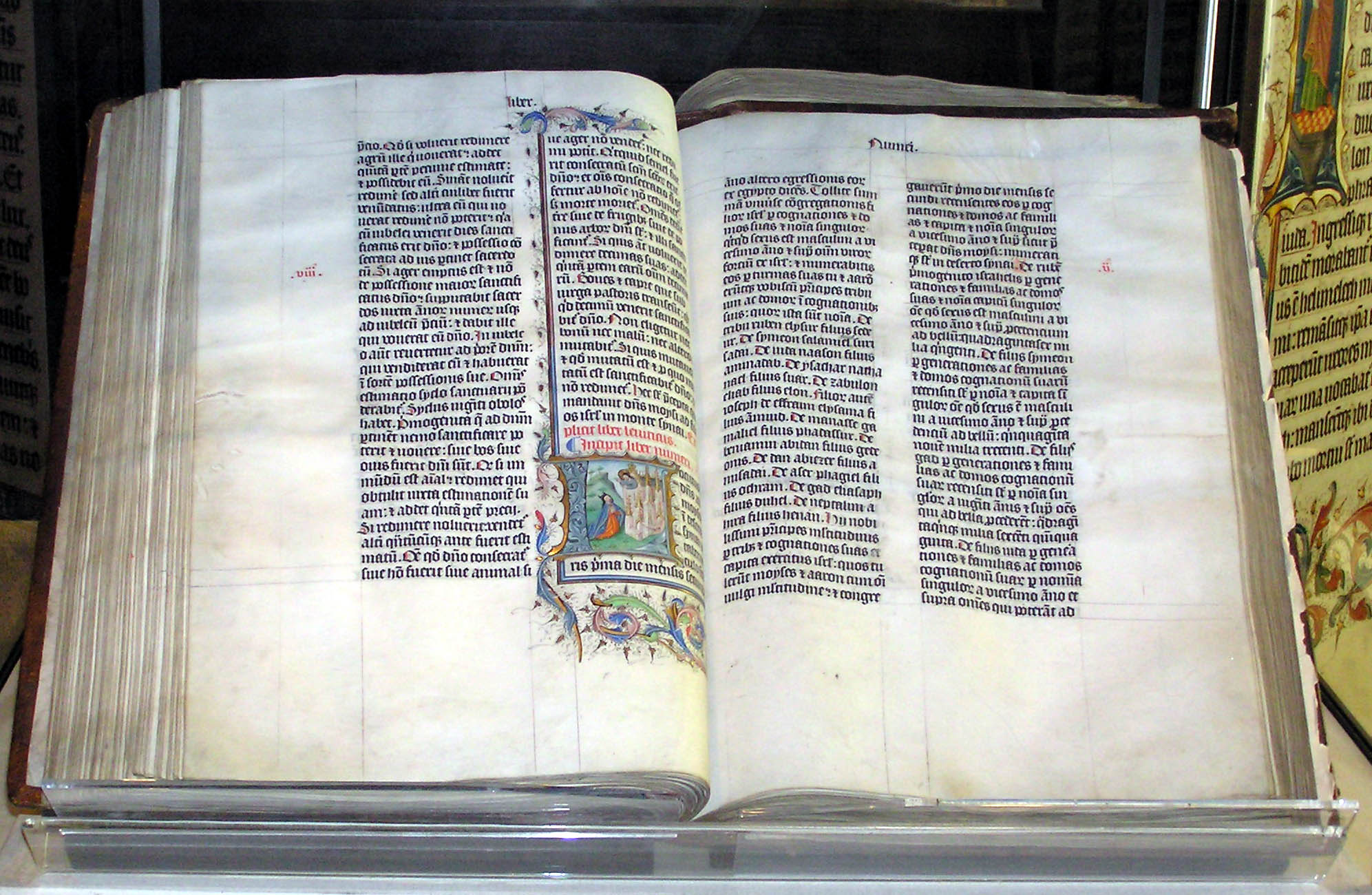
Critics see the Quran's reliance on various pre-existing sources as evidence for a human origin.

Critics point to various pre-existing sources to argue against the traditional narrative of revelation from God. Some scholars have calculated that one third of the Quran has pre-Islamic Christian origins. Aside from the Bible, the Quran is said to rely on several Apocryphal sources, like the Protoevangelium of James, Gospel of Pseudo-Matthew, and several infancy gospels. Certain narratives also are said to potentially parallel Jewish Midrashic literature, Several narratives rely on Jewish Midrash Tanhuma sources, such as the account of Cain learning to bury the body of Abel in Quran 5:31, which some link to the Midrash Tanhuma. Christian apologist Norman Geisler argues that the dependence of the Quran on preexisting sources is one evidence of a purely human origin. Richard Carrier regards this reliance on pre-Islamic Christian sources as evidence that Islam derived from a Torah-observant sect of Christianity. He also notes that assessing the Qur’an's origins involves unresolved questions and methodological challenges that continue to divide scholars.

In Islamic belief, the Qur’an's references to earlier scriptures are not seen as copied from them, but as confirming and correcting them. The Qur’an describes itself as “confirming what came before it and as a safeguard over it” (Q 5:48), invoking the concept of taḥrīf—the belief that previous revelations were divinely revealed but later distorted. Scholar Sidney H. Griffith explains that the Qur’an affirms earlier scripture while correcting beliefs that, from the Islamic perspective, had gone astray. He adds that many of these stories were transmitted orally in Late Antiquity, and describes the Qur’an's engagement with them as “a re-presentation, not a mere repetition.” Angelika Neuwirth similarly sees the Qur’an as part of a shared scriptural culture, reworking familiar material to create what she calls a “polyphonic, multilayered and highly referential text.” Gabriel Said Reynolds describes the Qur’an as functioning more like a sermon than a historical record—drawing on known narratives to deliver its own theological message rather than replicating earlier texts.

==== Criticism of the Hadith ====
It has been suggested that there exists around the Hadith (Muslim traditions relating to the Sunnah (words and deeds) of Muhammad) three major sources of corruption: political conflicts, sectarian prejudice, and the desire to translate the underlying meaning, rather than the original words verbatim.

Quranists, a theological movement within Islam, reject its authority on the grounds that the Quran itself is sufficient for guidance, as it claims that nothing essential has been omitted. They believe that reliance on the Hadith has caused people to deviate from the original intent of God's revelation to Muhammad, which they see as adherence to the Quran alone. Ghulam Ahmed Pervez was one of these critics and was denounced as a non-believer by thousands of orthodox clerics. In his work Maqam-e Hadith he considered any hadith that goes against the teachings of Quran to have been falsely attributed to the Prophet. Kassim Ahmad argued that some hadith promote ideas that conflict with science and create sectarian issues. While this view has attracted attention in some reformist circles, it remains a minority position in Islamic thought.

Mainstream Islamic traditions hold that the Qur’an expects Muslims to follow the Prophet's example, which is primarily preserved through hadith. Verses like Qur’an 59:7 (“...whatever the Messenger gives you, take it...”) are often cited as support. Scholars such as Jonathan A.C. Brown explain that hadith are seen not as additions to the Qur’an, but as practical explanations of its more general commands, such as how to pray or fast. He also notes that early Muslim scholars created detailed methods to check whether reports about the Prophet were reliable, including analysis of the transmitters (isnād) and the consistency of the content (matn). Fabricated or weak hadith were systematically identified and rejected in dedicated works.

Modern Western scholarship has raised doubts about the historicity and authenticity of hadith, while Joseph Schacht argued that there is no evidence of legal traditions prior to 722. Schacht concluded that the Sunna attributed to the Prophet consists of material from later periods rather than the actual words and deeds of the Prophet. While Schacht's theory shaped much of 20th-century scholarship, more recent studies using broader evidence and refined methods have significantly revised his conclusions. Scholars such as Harald Motzki have challenged this view by analyzing early legal texts and showing that many hadith can be reliably traced to the late 7th century, suggesting that legal traditions were already forming within the first generations of Muslims, earlier than Schacht proposed. Scholars like Wilferd Madelung have argued that a complete dismissal of hadith as late fiction is "unjustified".

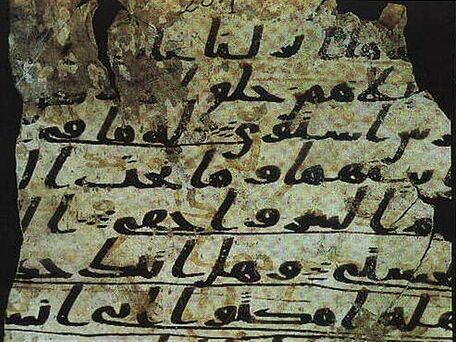
Sana'a manuscripts of the Quran

The traditional view of Islam has faced scrutiny due to a lack of consistent supporting evidence, such as limited archaeological finds and some discrepancies with non-Muslim sources. In the 1970s, a number of scholars began to re-evaluate established Islamic history, proposing that earlier accounts may have been altered over time. They sought to reconstruct early Islamic history using alternative sources like coins, inscriptions, and non-Islamic texts. Prominent among these scholars was John Wansbrough. Recent scholarship has taken a more cautious view of these revisionist claims. Fred M. Donner argues that the early Muslim community was too decentralized to have invented its religious tradition wholesale, and that early texts reflect sincere belief rather than retrospective construction. He also points to documentary evidence—such as inscriptions and papyri from the 7th century—that aligns with the existence of an identifiable Muslim movement. In addition, Ahmed El Shamsy has shown that early Muslim scholars developed rigorous methods for verifying transmission and preserving texts, creating a critical scholarly culture comparable to, and in some respects more advanced than, that of contemporaneous manuscript traditions.

=== Criticism of Muhammad ===
The Christian missionary Sigismund Koelle and the former Muslim Ibn Warraq have criticized Muhammad's actions as immoral. In one instance, the Jewish poet Ka'b ibn al-Ashraf provoked the Meccan tribe of Quraysh to fight Muslims and wrote erotic poetry about their women, and was apparently plotting to assassinate Muhammad. Muhammad called upon his followers to kill Ka'b, and he was consequently assassinated by Muhammad ibn Maslama, an early Muslim. Such criticisms were countered by the historian William M. Watt, who argues on the basis of moral relativism that Muhammad should be judged by the standards and norms of his own time and geography, rather than ours. The fourteenth-century poem Divine Comedy by the Italian poet Dante Alighieri contains images of Muhammad, picturing him the eighth circle of hell as a Heresiarch, along with his cousin and son-in-law Ali ibn Abi Talib. Dante does not blame Islam as a whole but accuses Muhammad of schism for establishing another religion after Christianity. Some medieval ecclesiastical writers portrayed Muhammad as possessed by Satan, a "precursor of the Antichrist" or the Antichrist himself. Tultusceptru de libro domni Metobii, an Andalusian manuscript of unknown origins, describes how Muhammad (called Ozim, from Hashim) was tricked by Satan into adulterating an originally pure divine revelation: God was concerned about the spiritual fate of the Arabs and wanted to correct their deviation from the faith. He then sent an angel to the Christian monk Osius who ordered him to preach to the Arabs. Osius, however, was in ill-health and instead ordered a young monk, Ozim, to carry out the angel's orders. Ozim set out to follow his orders, but was stopped by an evil angel on the way. The ignorant Ozim believed him to be the same angel that had spoken to Osius before. The evil angel modified and corrupted the original message given to Ozim by Osius, and renamed Ozim Muhammad. From this followed the erroneous teachings of Islam, according to Tultusceptru.

=== Islamic ethics ===
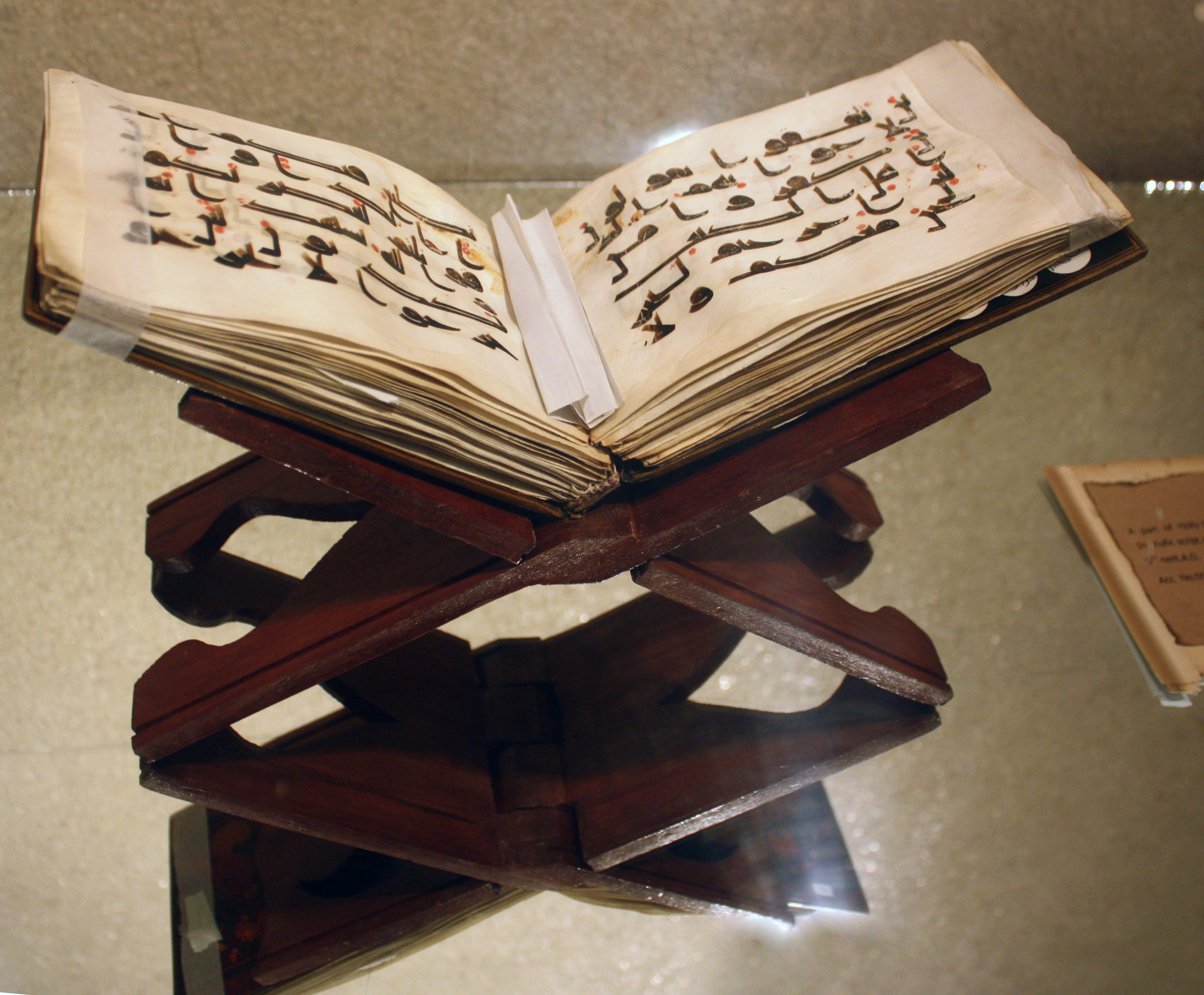
9th-century Quran in Reza Abbasi Museum

According to the Catholic Encyclopedia, while there is much to be admired and affirmed in Islamic ethics, its originality or superiority is rejected. Critics stated that the Quran 4:34 allows Muslim men to discipline their wives by striking them. There are arguments from Islamic hadiths and scholars such as Ibn Kathir that argue that only a twig or leaf can be used by a man to "strike" their wife and this is not allowed to cause pain or injure their wife but to show their frustration. Moreover, confusion amongst translations of Quran with the original Arabic term "wadribuhunna" being translated as "to go away from them", "beat", "strike lightly" and "separate". The film Submission critiqued this and similar verses of the Quran by displaying them painted on the bodies of abused Muslim women. Some critics argue that the Quran is incompatible with other religious scriptures as it attacks and advocates hate against people of other religions. Sam Harris interprets certain verses of the Quran as sanctioning military action against unbelievers as it said "Fight those who do not believe in Allah or in the Last Day and who do not consider unlawful what Allah and His Messenger have made unlawful and who do not adopt the religion of truth from those who were given the Scripture – [fight] until they give the jizyah willingly while they are humbled."(Quran 9:29) However, the Islamic hadiths and scholars such as Dr Zakir Naik refer to fighting and not to trust "non-believers" and Christians in certain situations or events such as during times of war.

Jizya is a tax for "protection" paid by non-Muslims to a Muslim ruler, for the exemption from military service for non-Muslims, and for the permission to practice a non-Muslim faith with some communal autonomy in a Muslim state. Harris argues that Muslim extremism is simply a consequence of taking the Quran literally, and is skeptical that moderate Islam is possible. (Note: Various calls to arms were identified in the Quran by US citizen Mohammed Reza Taheri-azar, all of which were cited as "most relevant to my actions on March 3, 2006" (Q9:44, 9:19, 57:10–11, 8:72–73, 9:120, 3:167–75, 4:66, 4:104, 9:81, 9:93–94, 9:100, 16:110, 61:11–12, 47:35).) Max I. Dimont interprets that the Houris described in the Quran are specifically dedicated to "male pleasure". According to Pakistani Islamic scholar Maulana Umar Ahmed Usmani "Hur" or "hurun" is the plural of both "ahwaro" which is a masculine form and also "haurao" which is a feminine, meaning both pure males and pure females. Basically, the word 'hurun' means white, he says.

=== Views on slavery ===
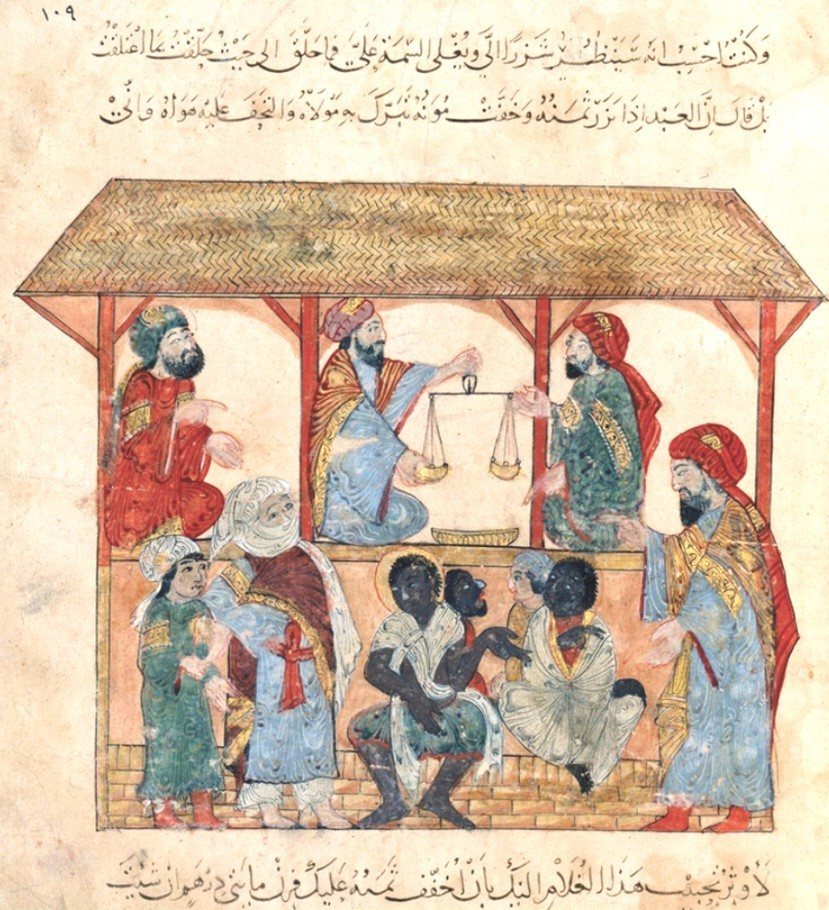
13th-century slave market in Yemen

According to Bernard Lewis, the Islamic injunctions against the enslavement of Muslims led to massive importation of slaves from the outside. Also Patrick Manning believes that Islam seems to have done more to protect and expand slavery than the reverse. Brockopp, on the other hand believe that the idea of using alms for the manumission of slaves appears to be unique to the Quran (^{[Quran 2:177]} and ^{[Quran 9:60]}). Similarly, the practice of freeing slaves in atonement for certain sins appears to be introduced by the Quran (but compare Exod 21:26-7). Also the forced prostitution of female slaves, a Near Eastern custom of great antiquity, is condemned in the Quran. According to Brockopp "the placement of slaves in the same category as other weak members of society who deserve protection is unknown outside the Qur'an. Some slaves had high social status in the Muslim world, such as the Mamluk enslaved mercenaries, who were assigned high-ranking military and administrative duties by the ruling Arab and Ottoman dynasties.

Critics argue unlike Western societies there have been no anti-slavery movements in Muslim societies, which according to Gordon was due to the fact that it was deeply anchored in Islamic law, thus there was no ideological challenge ever mounted against slavery. According to sociologist Rodney Stark, "the fundamental problem facing Muslim theologians vis-à-vis the morality of slavery" is that Muhammad himself engaged in activities such as purchasing, selling, and owning slaves, and that his followers saw him as the perfect example to emulate. Stark contrasts Islam with Christianity, writing that Christian theologians wouldn't have been able to "work their way around the biblical acceptance of slavery" if Jesus had owned slaves, as Muhammad did.

Only in the early 20th century did slavery gradually became outlawed and suppressed in Muslim lands, with Muslim-majority Mauritania being the last country in the world to formally abolish slavery in 1981. Murray Gordon characterizes Muhammad's approach to slavery as reformist rather than revolutionary that abolish slavery, but rather improved the conditions of slaves by urging his followers to treat their slaves humanely and free them as a way of expiating one's sins. In Islamic jurisprudence, slavery was theoretically an exceptional condition under the dictum The basic principle is liberty. Reports from Sudan and Somalia showing practice of slavery is in border areas as a result of continuing war and not Islamic belief. In recent years, except for some conservative Salafi Islamic scholars, (Note: In a 2014 issue of their digital magazine Dabiq, the Islamic State of Iraq and the Levant explicitly claimed religious justification for enslaving Yazidi women.) most Muslim scholars found the practice "inconsistent with Qur'anic morality".

=== Apostasy ===
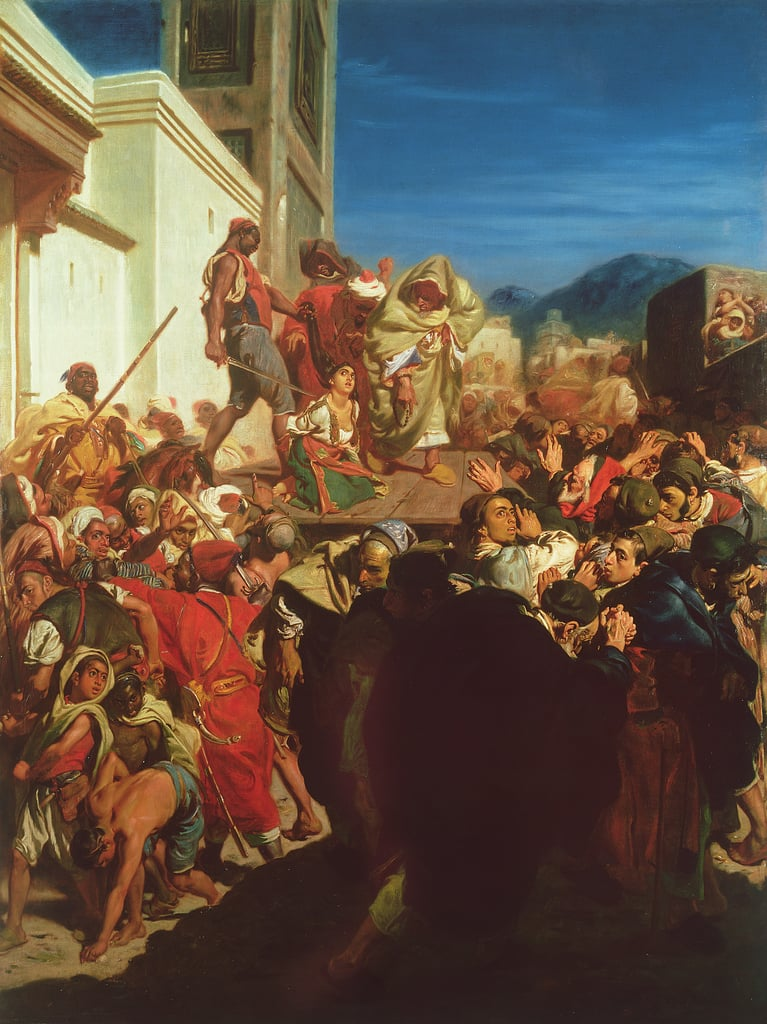
Execution of a Jewess in Morocco, c. 1861; one of several versions of this painting by the artist.

In Islam, apostasy along with heresy and blasphemy (verbal insult to all/any religion) is considered a form of sin. The Qur'an states that apostasy would bring punishment in the Afterlife, but takes a relatively lenient view of apostasy in this life (Q 9:74; 2:109). While Shafi'i interprets verse Quran 2:217 as adducing the main evidence for the death penalty in Quran, the historian W. Heffening states that the Quran threatens apostates with punishment in the next world only. The historian Wael Hallaq states the later addition of death penalty "reflects a later reality and does not stand in accord with the deeds of the Prophet."

According to Islamic law, apostasy is identified by a list of actions such as conversion to another religion, denying the existence of God, rejecting the prophets, mocking God or the prophets, idol worship, rejecting the sharia, or permitting behavior that is forbidden by the shari'a, such as adultery or the eating of forbidden foods or drinking of alcoholic beverages. The majority of Muslim scholars hold to the traditional view that apostasy is punishable by death or imprisonment until repentance, at least for adults of sound mind. Sunni and Shi'a scholars agree on the difference of punishment between male and female.

Some widely held interpretations of Islam are inconsistent with Human Rights conventions that recognize the right to change religion, in particular article 18 of the Universal Declaration of Human Rights.

Commenting on the death penalty for apostasy, William Montgomery Watt states that "In Islamic teaching, such penalties may have been suitable for the age in which Muhammad lived.". However, the death penalty for atheism remains in force in 13 Muslim-majority countries.

=== Mercy and procedural protections in classical Islamic law ===
Despite the theoretical severity of the punishment for apostasy, classical Islamic jurisprudence incorporated significant procedural protections that made execution extremely rare. Historian Sadakat Kadri notes that executions for apostasy were uncommon because "it was widely believed" that any accused apostate "who repented by articulating the shahada (LA ILAHA ILLALLAH – 'There is no God but God') had to be forgiven" and their punishment delayed until after Judgement Day.

The standard procedure required a waiting period during which the accused was given ample time to repent and return to Islam. During this time, a scholar would engage with the individual, answer their doubts, and attempt to resolve their theological questions. If the accused simply recited the shahada at any point, the punishment was immediately suspended. Legal scholars also recognized that an accused apostate could avoid punishment by outwardly recanting, even if their internal beliefs remained unchanged, as state officials could not punish unmanifested belief.

The kind of apostasy which the jurists generally deemed punishable was of the political kind—i.e., apostasy combined with sedition or treason against the state—although there were considerable legal differences of opinion on this matter. According to legal historian Sadakat Kadri, "state officials could not punish an unmanifested belief even if they wanted to."

Some contemporary Islamic jurists, such as Hussein-Ali Montazeri have argued or issued fatwas that state that either the changing of religion is not punishable or is only punishable under restricted circumstances.

According to Yohanan Friedmann, "The real predicament facing modern Muslims with liberal convictions is not the existence of stern laws against apostasy in medieval Muslim books of law, but rather the fact that accusations of apostasy and demands to punish it are heard time and again from radical elements in the contemporary Islamic world."

Wael Hallaq states that "[in] a culture whose lynchpin is religion, religious principles and religious morality, apostasy is in some way equivalent to high treason in the modern nation-state". Also Bernard Lewis consider the apostasy as a treason and "a withdrawal, a denial of allegiance as well as of religious belief and loyalty". The English historian C. E. Bosworth suggests the traditional view of apostasy hampered the development of Islamic learning, like philosophy and natural science, "out of fear that these could evolve into potential toe-holds for kufr, those people who reject God."

=== Islam and violence ===
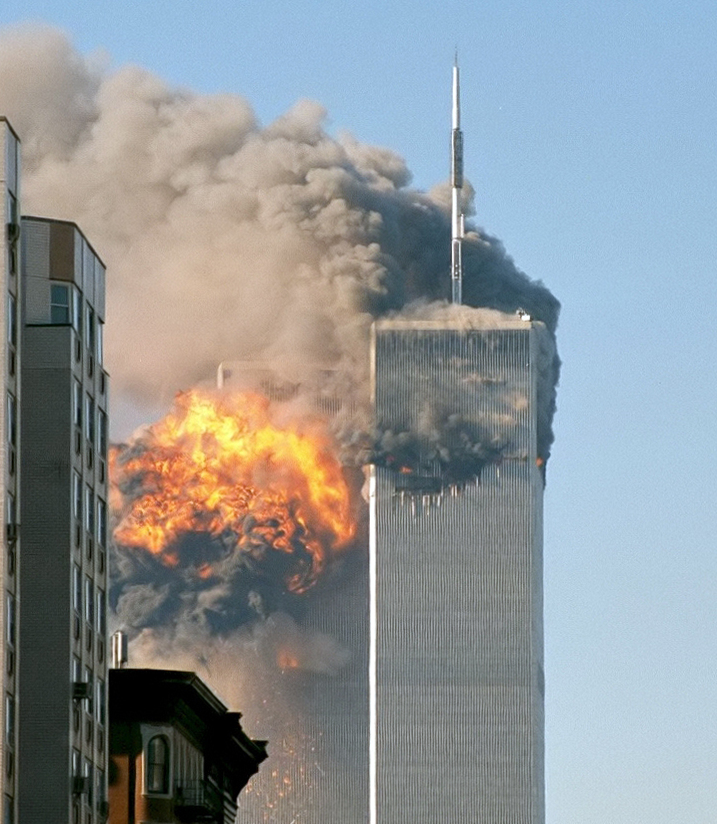
The September 11 attacks led to debate on whether Islam promotes violence.

Quran's teachings on matters of war and peace have become topics of heated discussion in recent years. On the one hand, some critics claim that certain verses of the Quran sanction military action against unbelievers as a whole both during the lifetime of Muhammad and after. Jihad, an Islamic term, is a religious duty of Muslims meaning "striving for the sake of God". It is perceived in a military sense (not spiritual sense) by Bernard Lewis and David Cook. Also Fawzy Abdelmalek and Dennis Prager argue against Islam being a religion of peace and not of violence. John R. Neuman, a scholar on religion, describes Islam as "a perfect anti-religion" and "the antithesis of Buddhism". Lawrence Wright argued that role of Wahhabi literature in Saudi schools contributing suspicion and hate violence against non-Muslims as non-believers or infidels and anyone who "disagrees with Wahhabism is either an infidel or a deviant, who should repent or be killed."

Most Muslim scholars, on the other hand, argue that such verses of the Quran are interpreted out of context, and argue that when the verses are read in context it clearly appears that the Quran prohibits aggression, and allows fighting only in self-defense. Charles Mathewes characterizes the peace verses as saying that "if others want peace, you can accept them as peaceful even if they are not Muslim." As an example, Mathewes cites the second sura, which commands believers not to transgress limits in warfare: "fight in God's cause against those who fight you, but do not transgress limits [in aggression]; God does not love transgressors" (2:190).

Orientalist David Margoliouth described the Battle of Khaybar as the "stage at which Islam became a menace to the whole world". In the battle reportedly Muslims beheaded Jews. Margoliouth argues that the Jews of Khaybar had done nothing to harm Muhammad or his followers, and ascribes the attack to a desire for plunder Montgomery Watt on the other hand, believes Jews' intriguing and use of their wealth to incite tribes against Muhammad left him no choice but to attack. Vaglieri and Shibli Numani concur that one reason for attack was that the Jews of Khaybar were responsible for the Confederates that attacked Muslims during the Battle of the Trench. Rabbi Samuel Rosenblatt has said that Muhammad's policies were not directed exclusively against Jews (referring to his conflicts with Jewish tribes) and that Muhammad was more severe with his pagan Arab kinsmen.

The September 11 attacks have resulted in many non-Muslims' indictment of Islam as a violent religion. In the European view, Islam lacked divine authority and regarded the sword as the route to heaven.

Karen Armstrong, tracing what she believes to be the West's long history of hostility toward Islam, finds in Muhammad's teachings a theology of peace and tolerance. Armstrong holds that the "holy war" urged by the Quran alludes to each Muslim's duty to fight for a just, decent society. According to Mahatma Gandhi, the leader of the 20th-century Indian independence movement, although non-violence is dominant in the Qur'an, thirteen hundred years of imperialist expansion have made Muslims a militant body.

Other self-described Muslim organisations have emerged more recently, and some of them have been associated with jihadist and extreme Islamist groups. Compared to the entire Muslim community, these groups are sparsely populated. They have, however, received more attention from governments, international organisations, and the international media than other Muslim groups. This is as a result of their participation in actions intended to combat alleged enemies of Islam both at home and abroad.

Years later however, Al-Qaeda has yet to succeed in gaining the support of the majority of Muslims and continues to differ from other Islamist organizations in terms of both philosophy and strategy.

==== Temporary and contractual marriages ====
Nikāḥ al-mutʿah is a fixed-term or short-term contractual marriage in Shia Islam. The duration of this type of marriage is fixed at its inception and is then automatically dissolved upon completion of its term. For this reason, nikah mut'ah has been widely criticised as the religious cover and legalization of prostitution. Shi'a and Sunnis agree that Mut'ah was legal in early times, but Sunnis consider that it was abrogated. Currently, however, mut'ah is one of the distinctive features of Ja'fari jurisprudence. Sunnis believe that Muhammad later abolished this type of marriage at several different large events,Bukhari 059.527 Most Sunnis believe that Umar later was merely enforcing a prohibition that was established during Muhammad's time.

Shia contest the criticism that nikah mut'ah is a cover for prostitution, and argue that the unique legal nature of temporary marriage distinguishes mut'ah ideologically from prostitution. Children born of temporary marriages are considered legitimate, and have equal status in law with their siblings born of permanent marriages, and do inherit from both parents. Women must observe a period of celibacy (idda) to allow for the identification of a child's legitimate father, and a woman can only be married to one person at a time, be it temporary or permanent. Some Shia scholars also view Mut'ah as a means of eradicating prostitution from society.

Nikah misyar is a type of Nikah (marriage) in Sunni Islam only carried out through the normal contractual procedure, with the provision that the husband and wife give up several rights by their own free will, such as living together, equal division of nights between wives in cases of polygamy, the wife's rights to housing, and maintenance money (nafaqa), and the husband's right of homekeeping and access. Essentially the couple continue to live separately from each other, as before their contract, and see each other to fulfil their needs in a legally permissible (halal) manner when they please. It has been the kind of relation between the prophet and his second wife Sawdah bint Zam'ah.

Misyar has been suggested by some western authors to be a comparable marriage with nikah mut'ah and that they find it for the sole purpose of "sexual gratification in a licit manner" Islamic scholars like Ibn Uthaimeen or Al-Albani claim that misyar marriage may be legal, but not moral.

==== Age of Muhammad's wife Aisha ====
According to Sunni hadith sources, Aisha was six or seven years old when she was married to Muhammad and nine when the marriage was consummated. The Muslim historian al-Tabari (d. 923) reports that she was ten, while Ibn Sa'd (d. 845) and Ibn Khallikan (d. 1282), two other Muslim historians, write that she was nine years old at marriage and twelve at consummation. Muhammad Ali (d. 1951), a modern Muslim author, argues that a new interpretation of the Hadith compiled by Mishkat al-Masabih, Wali-ud-Din Muhammad ibn Abdullah Al-Khatib, could indicate that Aisha would have been nineteen. Similarly, on the basis of a hadith about her age difference with her sister Asma, some have estimated that Aisha could have been eighteen or nineteen at the time of her marriage. At any rate, Muhammad's marriage to Aisha may have not been considered improper by his contemporaries, for such marriages between an older man and a young girl were common among the Bedouins. In particular, Karen Armstrong, an author on comparative religion, writes, "There was no impropriety in Muhammad's marriage to Aisha. Marriages conducted in absentia to seal an alliance were often contracted at this time between adults and minors who were even younger than Aisha."

=== Women in Islam ===
The meaning of Quran 4:34 has been the subject of intense debate among experts. While some scholars claim Shari'a law encourages domestic violence against women, many Muslim scholars argue that it acts as a deterrent against domestic violence motivated by rage. Shari'a is the basis for personal status laws such as rights of women in matters of marriage, divorce which was described as discriminatory against women from a human rights perspective in a 2011 UNICEF report. Allowing girls under 18 to marry by religious courts is another criticism of Islam. Shari'a grants women the right to inherit property but a daughter's inheritance is usually half that of her brother's. However, this is justified by some because the brother needs to care for his family and his sister if a male guardian isn't present.^{[Quran 4:11]} Furthermore, slave women were not granted the same legal rights.

In contrast to the widespread Western belief that women in Muslim societies are oppressed and denied opportunities to realize their full potential, many Muslims believe their faith to be liberating or fair to women, and some find it offensive that Westerners criticize it without fully understanding the historical and contemporary realities of Muslim women's lives. Conservative Muslims in particular (in common with some Christians and Jews) see women in the West as being economically exploited for their labor, sexually abused, and commodified through the media's fixation on the female body. However, secularists like human rights campaigner and women's rights activist Yasmine Mohammed have criticized this Muslim view of women as promoting an oppressive and misogynistic modesty culture.

=== Multiculturalism and Islam ===
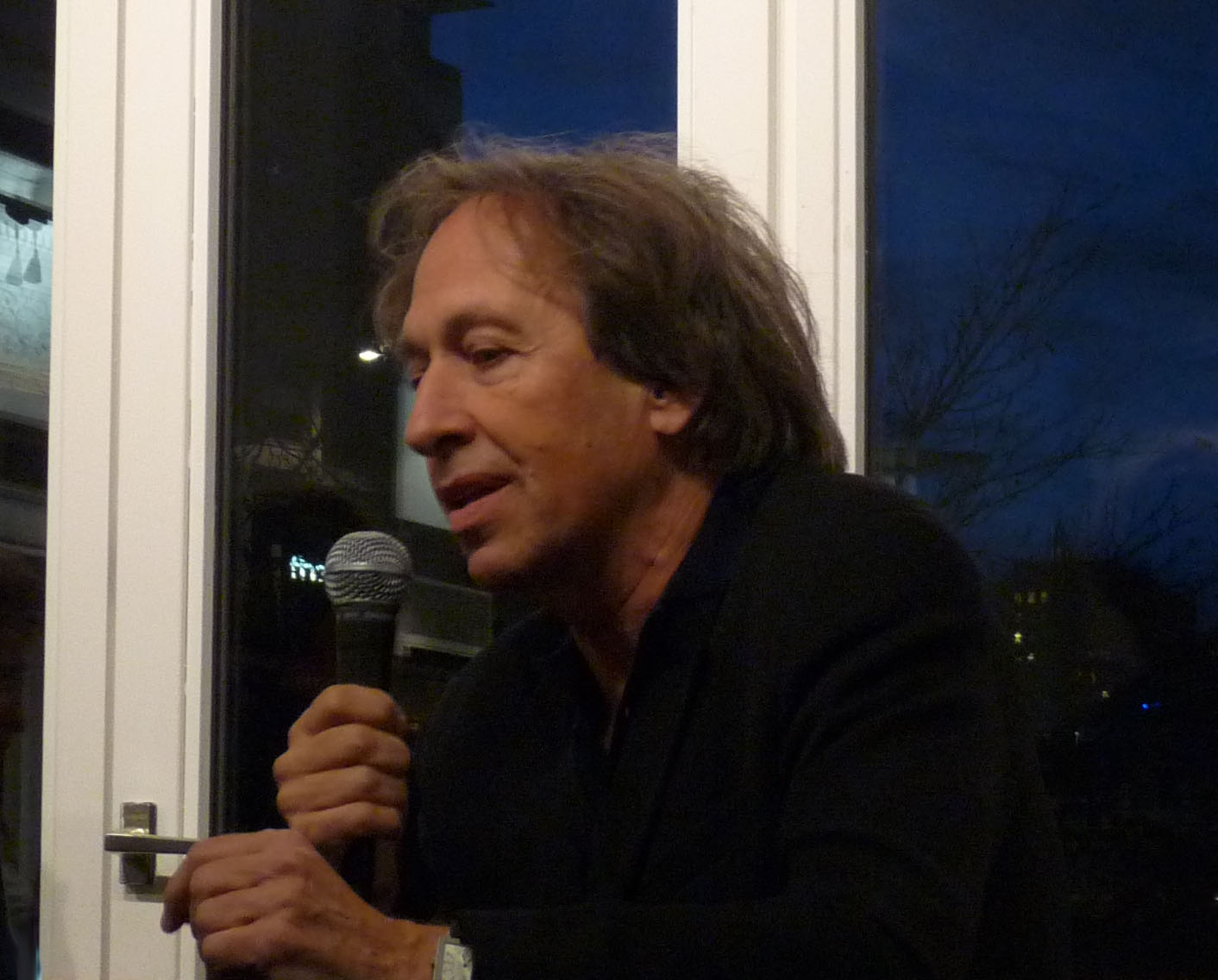
French philosopher Pascal Bruckner has criticised the effects of multiculturalism and Islam in the West.

Muslim immigration to Western countries has led some critics to label Islam incompatible with secular Western society. This criticism has been partly influenced by a stance against multiculturalism closely linked to the heritage of New Philosophers. Recent critics include Pascal Bruckner and Paul Cliteur. Tatar Tengrists criticize Islam as a Semitic religion, which forced Turks to submission to an alien culture. Further, since Islam mentions Semitic history as if it were the history of all mankind, but disregards components of other cultures and spirituality, the international approach of Islam is seen as a threat. Mustafa Kemal Atatürk, founder of the Turkish Republic, described Islam as the religion of the Arabs that loosened the national nexus of Turkish nation, got national excitement numb.

In the early 20th century, the prevailing view among Europeans was that Islam was the root cause of Arab "backwardness". They saw Islam as an obstacle to assimilation, a view that was expressed by one of the spokesmen of colonial French Algeria named André Servier. The Victorian orientalist scholar Sir William Muir criticised Islam for what he perceived to be an inflexible nature, which he held responsible for stifling progress and impeding social advancement in Muslim countries.

Jocelyne Cesari, in her study of discrimination against Muslims in Europe, finds that anti-Islamic sentiment may be difficult to separate from other drivers of discrimination because Muslims are mainly from immigrant backgrounds and the largest group of immigrants in many Western European countries, xenophobia overlaps with Islamophobia, and a person may have one, the other, or both.

== See also ==
- Abrogation
- Bibliolatry
- Criticism of Islamism
- Islamic fundamentalism
- Islamic terrorism
- Islam and war
- Political aspects of Islam
- Political Islam
- Al-Ahkam al-Sultaniyyah
- Al-Siyasa al-Shar'iyya fi Islah al-Ra'i wa al-Ra'iyya
- Sharia Law
- LGBT topics and Islam
- Quran and violence
- Criticism of Twelver Shia Islam
- Haram
- List of critics of Islam
- Apostasy in Islam
- Islamic feminism
- LetUsTalk
- Islamophobia
- Islamophobia in the media
- Islamophobia in the United States
- Orientalism
- Muslims Condemn
- Persecution of Muslims
- Predestination in Islam
- Quranic inerrancy
- Qur'anic literalism
- Superstitions in Muslim societies
- War against Islam conspiracy theory
