= The Quest of the Historical Muhammad =

The Quest of the Historical Muhammad may refer to:

- The Quest of the Historical Muhammad (Peters), by Francis Edwards Peters
- The Quest of the Historical Muhammad (Jeffery), by Arthur Jeffery
- The Quest for the Historical Muhammad (Ibn Warraq), by Ibn Warraq
