= Paul E. Kahle =

German orientalist and scholar (1875–1964)

- Born: January 21, 1875; Hohenstein, Prussia
- Died: September 24, 1964 (aged 89); Düsseldorf
- Employer: Gießen University
- Known for: Editor of the Hebrew Bible
- Notable work: The Cairo Geniza
- Title: Ordinary professor

Paul Ernst Kahle (January 21, 1875 – September 24, 1964) was a German orientalist and scholar.

== Biography ==
Born 21 January 1875, in Olsztynek, Prussia, Kahle studied orientalism and theology in Marburg and Halle. He attained his doctorate in 1898. His dissertation on the Samaritan Pentateuch was supervised by Franz Praetorius. Kahle worked as a Lutheran pastor. He studied Semitic philology in Cairo, between 1903 and 1909. In 1909, he acquired leather puppets near Damietta, Egypt used in medieval shadow plays. In 1918, he was promoted to a full professorship (Ordinary professor) at Gießen University, a chair previously held by Friedrich Schwally. In 1923, he switched to Bonn University, where he developed the Eastern Studies curriculum by adding a Chinese and a Japanese class.

After his wife helped a Jewish neighbor whose shop was ransacked during the Kristallnacht of 1938, Kahle's family was persecuted by the Nazis. This drove him to immigrate to the United Kingdom where he joined the University of Oxford in 1939, having been dismissed from his university post in Bonn, owing in great part to the fact that he had a Polish rabbi (Yechiel Yaakov Weinberg) as an assistant. At Oxford he gained two further doctorates. During this period at Oxford he suffered the personal tragedy of his son Paul's early death.

Kahle returned to Germany after the war, where he pursued his research as professor emeritus. His principal academic renown is as editor of the Biblia Hebraica Stuttgartensia, an annotated edition of the Hebrew Bible closely based on the Leningrad Codex.

Part of his work is published in the book What the Koran Really Says, edited by Ibn Warraq. A multi-language Festschrift was published at Berlin in 1968.

== Works ==
- Textkritische und lexikalische Bemerkungen zum samaritanischen Pentateuchtargum. [Diss. phil.] Halle 1898.
- Der masoretische Text des Alten Testaments nach der Überlieferung der babylonischen Juden. [Diss. theol.] Halle 1902.
- Masoreten des Ostens. Leipzig: Hinrichs 1913.
- Volkserzählungen aus Palästina: gesammelt bei den Bauern von Bir-Zet und in Verbindung mit Dschirius Jusif in Jerusalem, Vandenhoeck und Ruprecht, 1918
- Masoreten des Westens. I, Stuttgart: Kohlhammer Verlag 1927; II, Stuttgart: Kohlhammer 1930.
- The Cairo Geniza. (Schweich Lectures for 1941) London: Oxford University Press 1947.
- Der hebräische Bibeltext seit Franz Delitzsch. Stuttgart: Kohlhammer Verlag 1961.
- Die Kairoer Genisa. Untersuchungen zur Geschichte des hebräischen Bibeltextes und seiner Übersetzungen, ed. by R. Meyer. Berlin 1962 (= The Cairo Geniza, Oxford ^{2}1959).
