= Inerrancy =

Inerrancy may refer to:

- Biblical inerrancy - a theological notion in Christianity
- Quranic inerrancy - a theological notion in Islam

== See also ==
- Infallibility
