= William St. Clair Tisdall =

British orientalist

William St. Clair Tisdall (1859–1928) was a British Anglican priest, linguist, historian and philologist who served as the Secretary of the Church of England's Missionary Society in Isfahan, Persia.

== Career ==
Tisdall was the principal at the Training College in Amritsar and later was the missionary in charge of the C.M.S. Muhammadan Mission in Bombay.

He was fluent in several Middle Eastern languages, including Arabic, and spent much time researching the sources of Islam and the Qur'an in the original languages. He also wrote grammars for Persian, Hindustani, Punjabi and Gujarati.

As an early scholar of Gujarati grammar, he defined three major varieties of Gujarati: a standard 'Hindu' dialect, a 'Parsi' dialect and a 'Muslim' dialect.

He was awarded the honorary degree Doctor of Divinity (DD) from the University of Edinburgh in 1903.

== Recent criticisms of Tisdall ==
Clinton Bennett, in his Victorian Images of Islam (1992), paints Tisdall as a confrontationalist perpetuating a traditional Christian anti-Muslim polemic.

Tisdall was one of thirteen authors whose essays were compiled in The Origins of The Koran: Classic Essays on Islam’s Holy Book, a 1998 book edited by Ibn Warraq. In reviewing the compilation, religious studies professor Herbert Berg panned the inclusion of Tisdall's work as "not a particularly scholarly essay". Berg concluded "[i]t seems that Ibn Warraq has included some of the essays not on the basis of their scholarly value or their status as 'classics', but rather on the basis of their hostility to Islam. This does not necessarily diminish the value of the collection, but the reader should be aware that this collection does not fully represent classic scholarship on the Quran".

Tisdall accuses Muhammad of inventing revelations according to what he believed to be the need of the moment.

== Bibliography ==
- The Gospel of St. John in the original Greek : (the revisers' text) : together with literal interlinear translations into Urdu and Persian, and Persian notes upon certain difficult passages, Printed at the Allahabad Mission Press for the Punjab Bible Society, Allahabad, 1890
- A simplified grammar of the Gujarātī language together with a short reading book and vocabulary, London: Kegan Paul, Trench, Trübner & Co., 1892 (Trübner's Collection of Simplified Grammars of the Principal Asiatic and European Languages); reprinted Bombay, D. B. Taraporevala, n.d.; New York, Frederick Ungar, 1961; New Delhi: Asian Educational Series, 1986
- A Manual of the Leading Muhammadan Objections to Christianity, London: Society for Promoting Christian Knowledge, 1904
- The Original Sources of the Qu'ran: Its Origin In Pagan Legends and Mythology, London: Society for Promoting Christian Knowledge, 1905
- Saeed, Abu Hayyan, The Base of Orientalism, what are the facts.. (December 4, 2023). Available at SSRN: https://ssrn.com/abstract=4652345 or http://dx.doi.org/10.2139/ssrn.4652345
