= Charles Cutler Torrey =

American historian and archaeologist (1863–1956)

- Born: 20 December 1863
- Died: 12 November 1956 (aged 92)

Academic work
- Discipline: history archaeology
- Institutions: Andover Theological Seminary; Yale University
- Main interests: origins of Christian and Islamic religious texts
- Notable works: The Jewish Foundation of Islam

Charles Cutler Torrey (20 December 1863 – 12 November 1956) was an American historian, archaeologist and scholar. While he was a Christian and the son of a reverend, he was a close friend of the progressive rabbi George Alexander Kohut. He studied with Theodor Nöldeke, one of the most important orientalists and scholars of Islam of all time.

== Career ==
He is known for presenting, through his books, manuscript evidence supporting alternate views on the origins of Christian and Islamic religious texts. He wanted to revise current knowledge of Islam and significantly improve the state of textual criticism. He founded the American School of Archaeology at Jerusalem in 1901.

Torrey taught Semitic languages at the Andover Theological Seminary (1892–1900) and Yale University (1900–1932). He countered certain parts of the Biblical interpretation of Catholic theologian Albert Condamin concerning the Book of Jeremiah.

Some of Torrey's studies are included in The Origins of The Koran: Classic Essays on Islam's Holy Book, edited by Ibn Warraq.

== Jewish origin of Islam ==
One of Torrey's major works was The Jewish Foundation of Islam (1933), where he suggests that Muhammad based Islam and the Quran, not on Christianity as was (and is) generally believed, but on a Semitic faith that goes back to Ismael, and on strong Jewish bases. He notably held that the Ramadan month patterned the Christian fast of Lent, but that, as Muhammad knew little about Christianity, he only knew the Jewish way of fasting and imposed it to his believers. This hypothesis is rather weak (as it does not justify why that specific month was chosen, and there are other major differences) and was strongly criticized in later scholarship. In general in can be summarized that, in Torrey's opinion, Islam as created by Muhammad was based on Jewish and Pagan bases, but contained a definite Christian element as well. Most of the foundation of Islam, however, he holds to be built on Jewish bases. To him, the presence of important Jewish colonies in Arabia is due to massive migration of Israelites from the North. Torrey also believes that the Muslim ablution practices were based on Jewish customs. Torrey held that

"in the Koran itself there is no clear evidence that Mohammed had ever received instruction from a Christian teacher, while many facts testify emphatically to the contrary; and [...] on the other hand, the evidence that he gained his Christian material either from Jews in Mekka, or from what was well known and handed about in the Arabian cities, is clear, consistent, and convincing."

And that: "He lived among Israelites, and knew much about them."

These opinions are still debated and, while Torrey's works have definitely weighed on scientific knowledge, scholarship still has not reached a united conviction on these topics. However, Torrey's arguments on the fact that reading and writing were much more common in the Hijaz that usually thought are confirmed by archaeology of the region in the 20th and 21st centuries, where thousands of inscriptions in Safaitic, Arabic and Nabateo-Arabic were found.

== Books ==
- The Mohammedan Conquest of Egypt and North Africa (1901), based on the Arabic work of Ibn 'Abd al-Hakam, of which he subsequently published an edition (1922).
- The Jewish Foundation of Islam (1933).
- The Composition and Historical Value of Ezra-Nehemiah (pamphlet published 1896): conclusions drawn from a study of the Septuagint's 1 Esdras.
- Ezra Studies (1910)
- The Chronicler's History of Israel (1954).
- In The Second Isaiah: A New Interpretation (1928), he argued that Isa. 34–35 and 40–66 should be dated c. 400 BC.
- Original Prophecy (1930) presents his theory that the canonical Book of Ezekiel is a revision of a 3rd-century pseudepigraphon.
- The Translations Made from the Original Aramaic Gospels (1912)
- The Four Gospels: A New Translation (1933)
- Our Translated Gospels (1936), Torrey held that the four Gospels were Greek translations from Aramaic originals.
- Apocalypse of John (1958) argues that Revelation was a translation of an Aramaic original written in AD 68.
