= Ibn Warraq =

Critic of Islam (born 1946)

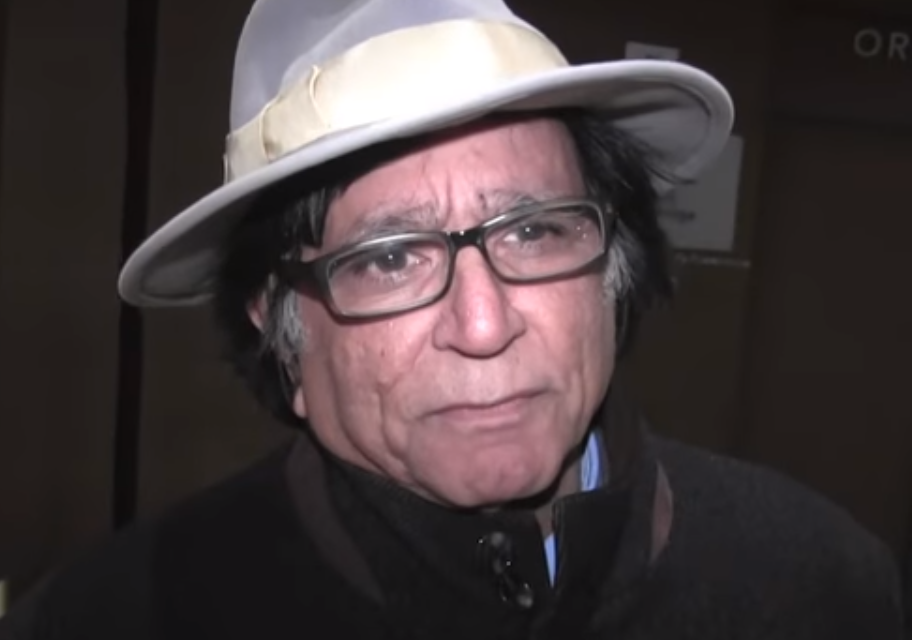
- Ibn Warraq in 2018
- Born: 1946 (age 79–80); Rajkot, Gujarat, British India
- Education: University of Edinburgh
- Occupation: Author
- Writing career
- Years active: 1995–present
- Subject: Criticism of Islam

Ibn Warraq (born 1946) is the pen name of an anonymous author critical of Islam. He is the founder of the Institute for the Secularisation of Islamic Society and used to be a senior research fellow at the Center for Inquiry, focusing on Quranic criticism. Warraq is the vice-president of the World Encounter Institute.

Warraq has written historiographies of the early centuries of the Islamic timeline and has published works which question mainstream conceptions of the period. The pen name Ibn Warraq (Arabic: ابن وراق, most literally "son of a papermaker") is used due to his concerns for his personal safety; Warraq stated, "I was afraid of becoming the second Salman Rushdie." It is a name that has been adopted by dissident authors throughout the history of Islam. The name refers to the 9th-century skeptical scholar Abu Isa al-Warraq. Warraq adopted the pseudonym in 1995 when he completed his first book, entitled Why I Am Not a Muslim. (Note: "There were several reasons, which are still valid. In 1993, I had begun writing my book Why I Am Not a Muslim; when it appeared in 1995, I was professor for British and American culture at the University of Toulouse. I was afraid to become the second Salman Rushdie, I did not want not to die and I had my family to protect. My brother and his family do not know until today that I wrote the book. I do not want that they have to suffer on my account.")

He is the editor of several books, also including The Origins of the Koran (1998), The Quest for the Historical Muhammad (2000), What the Koran Really Says (2002) and the writer/editor Leaving Islam (2003). He is a controversial figure among his contemporaries as many academic specialists in Islamic history consider him to be polemical, overly revisionist and lacking in expertise.

== Early life and education ==
Warraq was born in Rajkot, Gujarat in British India and his family migrated to the newly independent Pakistan in 1947. His family were of Kutchi origin. Although born in India, he held a Pakistani passport.

His mother died when he was an infant. He stated in an interview that he "studied Arabic and read the Qur'an as a young man in hopes of becoming a follower of the Islamic faith." (Note: The quote in German as printed in Der Spiegel is: "Ich bin nicht mit Religion indoktriniert worden") His father decided to send him to a boarding school in England, which in Warraq's opinion, was partly to circumvent a grandmother's effort to push an exclusively religious education on his son at the local madrasa. After his arrival in Britain, he only saw his father once more, when he was 14; his father died four years later. At 18, he took part in the Bridge in Britain exchange in Israel, working on a kibbutz for six months. He had no idea that Pakistan had no relations with Israel and the scholarship embarrassed his father. He enjoyed the experience greatly. It also made him more aware of being from a Muslim background, as he met people of different religions in Israel.

By 19, he had moved to Scotland to pursue his education at the University of Edinburgh, where he studied philosophy and Arabic with Islamic studies scholar W. Montgomery Watt.

After graduating, Warraq was a primary school teacher in London for five years and moved to France with his wife in 1982, opening an Indian restaurant. He also worked as a courier for a travel agent. Growing up, Warraq was "shy" for most of his youth.

== Career ==
Warraq began writing against Islam due to what he saw as the inclination of Western intellectuals to blame Salman Rushdie during the Satanic Verses controversy. He noticed a lack of anti-Islam tracts in Free Inquiry, an American secular humanist publication, and wrote on topics such as "Why I am not Muslim." Warraq was hosted by David Frum, speech-writer of George W. Bush at the White House shortly after the 9/11; Frum maintains silence. In March 2006, he co-signed a manifesto in response to violent protests in the Islamic world surrounding the Jyllands-Posten Muhammad cartoons controversy, declaring Islam as a totalitarian regime.

In October 2007, Warraq participated in an Intelligence Squared debate, "We Should Not Be Reluctant to Assert the Superiority of Western Values," in London. He argued in favor of the motion; arguing on the same side as him were Douglas Murray and David Aaronovitch, while their opponents were Tariq Ramadan, William Dalrymple, and Charles Glass. Although he does not subscribe to any particular religion, he has a higher opinion of humanism than of Islam and has described himself as an atheist. (Note: The quote in German as printed in Der Spiegel is: "Heute bin ich ein Atheist.") He is the founder of the Institute for the Secularisation of Islamic Society (ISIS). He has also been on the advisory board of the International Free Press Society, and been associated with the counter-jihad movement.

== Books and reception ==
Ibn Warraq continued writing with several works examining the historiography of the Qur'an and Muhammad. Other books treated the topic of secular humanist values among Muslims. In The Origins of The Koran: Classic Essays on Islam's Holy Book, Ibn Warraq includes some of Theodor Nöldeke's studies. In 2005, Warraq spent several months working with Christoph Luxenberg, who wrote about Syriac vs. Arabic interpretation of Quranic verse.

A pattern in Warraq's work is paying homage to earlier scholarly works on Christianity by borrowing their titles and applying them to Islam: Why I Am Not a Muslim is taken from Bertrand Russell's Why I Am Not a Christian (1927), The Quest for the Historical Muhammad is taken from Albert Schweitzer's The Quest of the Historical Jesus (1910), and What the Koran Really Says is taken from German author Manfred Barthel's Was wirklich in der Bibel steht ("What the Bible Really Says", 1980).

=== Praise ===
In a 1996 review of Why I Am Not a Muslim, Daniel Pipes wrote that "With few exceptions, he [Warraq] relies almost entirely on the Western tradition of Islamic studies" but concluded that "Despite his anger, 'Ibn Warraq' has written a serious and thought-provoking book" calling for "an equally compelling response from a believing Muslim." Pipes also described Why I am not a Muslim (1995) as "well-researched and quite brilliant." David Pryce-Jones said that it was "a scrupulously documented examination of the life and teaching of the Prophet Muhammad, of the Qur'an and its sources, and the resulting culture." Christopher Hitchens described Why I Am Not a Muslim as his "favorite book on Islam."

In 2007, Douglas Murray described Ibn Warraq as:

the great Islamic scholar ... one of the great heroes of our time. Personally endangered, yet unremittingly vocal, Ibn Warraq leads a trend. Like a growing number of people, he refuses to accept the idea that all cultures are equal. Were Ibn Warraq to live in Pakistan or Saudi Arabia, he would not be able to write. Or if he did, he would not be allowed to live. Among his work is criticism of the sources of the Qur'an. In Islamic states this constitutes apostasy.

In a 2008 review of Ibn Warraq's book, Defending the West: A Critique of Edward Said's Orientalism, political scientist Peter Berkowitz described Warraq as a "worthy critic" for Edward Said. Berkowitz said that "with a rare combination of polemical zest and prodigious learning, it [Defending the West] is the first [book-length critique] to address and refute Said's arguments 'against the background of a more general presentation of salient aspects of Western civilization.'" In a 2009 review of Defending the West A. J. Caschetta concluded that "Ibn Warraq's critique of Said's thought and work is thorough and convincing, indeed devastating to anyone depending on Saidism. It should do to Orientalism what Mary Lefkowitz's Not Out of Africa did to Martin Bernal's Black Athena." Pryce-Jones said that it "demolishes in close detail the Saidian 'narrative.'"

In a 2012 review of Ibn Warraq's book, Virgins? What Virgins, Rice University historian of Islam David Cook wrote: "As a scholar of Islam myself, I find Ibn Warraq's attitude to be very refreshing, and his scholarship for the most part to be accurate and devastating in pinpointing the weaknesses in Muslim orthodoxy." The book's third essay, Cook continues, "could almost serve as a history of our field, and of its systematic failure to critique the foundational texts of Islam as those of other faiths have been critiqued."

=== Criticism ===
In reviewing Ibn Warraq's compilation The Origins of the Koran, religious studies professor Herbert Berg has labelled him as "polemical and inconsistent" in his writing. Berg lauded the inclusion of the essay by Theodor Nöldeke, but panned the inclusion of William St. Clair Tisdall's as "not a particularly scholarly essay". He concluded "[i]t seems that Ibn Warraq has included some of the essays not on the basis of their scholarly value or their status as 'classics', but rather on the basis of their hostility to Islam. This does not necessarily diminish the value of the collection, but the reader should be aware that this collection does not fully represent classic scholarship on the Quran."

In reviewing Ibn Warraq's essay in his Quest for the Historical Muhammad (2001) Fred Donner, a professor in Near Eastern studies, notes his lack of specialist training in Arabic studies, citing "inconsistent handling of Arabic materials," and unoriginal arguments, and "heavy-handed favoritism" towards revisionist theories and "the compiler's [i.e. Ibn Warraq's] agenda, which is not scholarship, but anti-Islamic polemic." Anthropologist and historian Daniel Martin Varisco has criticized Ibn Warraq's book Defending the West: A Critique of Edward Said's Orientalism, writing that "This modern son of a bookseller imprints a polemical farce not worth the 500-plus pages of paper it wastes."

His work, The Origins of the Koran, is itself based on a polemic by St. Clair Tisdall "The original sources of the Qur'an" which was described by François de Blois as a "decidedly shoddy piece of missionary propaganda".

François de Blois in reviewing The Origins of the Koran, states that "it is surprising that the editor, who in his Why I am not a Muslim took a very high posture as a critical rationalist and opponent of all forms of obscurantism, now relies so heavily on writings by Christian polemicists from the nineteenth century". Asma Afsaruddin states that "Ibn Warraq is not interested in debate; he wants nothing less than wholesale conversion to his point of view within the community of scholars of Islam" and added that his work, The Origins of the Koran, "needlessly poisons the atmosphere and stymies efforts to engage in honest scholarly discussion".

== Works ==
- Why I Am Not a Muslim, Ibn Warraq, foreword by R. Joseph Hoffmann, Prometheus Books, 1995, hardcover, 428 pages, ISBN 0-87975-984-4
- The Origins of the Koran: Classic Essays on Islam's Holy Book, edited by Ibn Warraq, Prometheus Books, 1998, hardcover, 420 pages, ISBN 1-57392-198-X
- The Quest for the Historical Muhammad, edited and translated by Ibn Warraq, Prometheus Books, 2000, hardcover, 554 pages, ISBN 1-57392-787-2
- What the Koran Really Says: Language, Text, and Commentary, edited and translated by Ibn Warraq, Prometheus Books, 2002, 600 pages, ISBN 1-57392-945-X
- Leaving Islam: Apostates Speak Out, edited by Ibn Warraq, Prometheus Books, 2003, hardcover, 320 pages, ISBN 1-59102-068-9
- Defending the West: A Critique of Edward Said's Orientalism, Prometheus Books, 2007, hardcover, 300 pages, ISBN 1-59102-484-6
- Which Koran?: Variants, Manuscripts, and the Influence of Pre-Islamic Poetry, Prometheus Books, 2008, 631 pages, ISBN 978-1-59102-429-3
- Why the West is Best: A Muslim Apostate's Defense of Liberal Democracy, Encounter Books, 2011, 286 pages, ISBN 1-59403-576-8
- Sir Walter Scott's Crusades & Other Fantasies, Ibn Warraq, New English Review Press, 2013, paperback, 259 pages, ISBN 978-0-9884778-5-8
- Koranic Allusions: The Biblical, Qumranian, and pre-Islamic background to the Koran, Prometheus Books, 2013, 463 pages, ISBN 9781616147594
- Christmas in the Koran: Luxenberg, Syriac, and the Near Eastern and Judeo-Christian Background of Islam, edited by Ibn Warraq, Prometheus Books, 2014, hardcover, 805 pages, ISBN 978-1-61614-937-6
- The Islam in Islamic Terrorism: The Importance of Beliefs, Ideas, and Ideology, Ibn Warraq, New English Review Press, 2017, paperback, 396 pages, ISBN 978-1943003082
- Leaving the Allah Delusion Behind: Atheism and Freethought in Islam, Berlin Schiller, 2020, hardcover, 700 pages, ISBN 3899302567

== See also ==
- Apostasy in Islam
- Bibliography of books critical of Islam
- List of former Muslims
- Religious conversion
