= Arthur Jeffery =

Australian orientalist (1892–1959)

- Born: 18 October 1892; Melbourne, Australia
- Died: 2 August 1959 (aged 66); South Milford, Canada
- Education: School of Oriental Studies in Cairo, Columbia University, Union Theological Seminary
- Occupations: professor of Semitic languages, author

Arthur Jeffery (18 October 1892 in Melbourne, Australia – 2 August 1959 in South Milford, Canada) was a Protestant Australian professor of Semitic languages from 1921 at the School of Oriental Studies in Cairo, and from 1938 until his death jointly at Columbia University and Union Theological Seminary in New York City. Jeffery was awarded a D.Litt. from Edinburgh University in 1938. He is the author of extensive historical studies of Middle Eastern manuscripts.

His important works include Materials for the History of the Text of the Qur'an: The Old Codices, which catalogs all surviving documented variants of the orthodox Quran text; and The Foreign Vocabulary of the Qur'an, which traces the origins of 318 foreign (non-Arabic) words found in the Qur'an.

Some of Jeffery's studies are included in The Origins of The Koran: Classic Essays on Islam’s Holy Book, edited by Ibn Warraq. They are also discussed in Mohar Ali's The Qur'an and The Orientalists:

== Books ==
Books by Arthur Jeffery include:

- The Textual History of the Qur'an
- The Mystic Letters of the Koran
- A Variant Text of the Fatiha
- The Orthography of the Samarqand Codex
- Materials for the History of the Text of the Qur'an The old codices 1937. ISBN 9789333498012
- The Foreign Vocabulary of the Qur'an
- A Reader on Islam
