= LetUsTalk =

Campaign defending a right to criticize Islam

LetUsTalk#

#LetUsTalk (Persian: بگذارید حرف بزنیم#) is a campaign against silencing criticism of the Islamic law and especially hijab in the West through accusations of Islamophobia. This campaign has started when a letter written by Dr Sherif Emil—a Canadian Children’s surgeon—and published in the Canadian Medical Association Journal, in which he criticizes promotion of hijab as a symbol of diversity, was retracted due to the accusations of Islamophobia. Many middle eastern women, including Iranians and Afghans, have shared their lived experience and stories of being oppressed by the Islamic law using this hashtag. The campaign defends the right of criticizing Islam and protests the censorship of such criticism with the accusations of Islamophobia.

== Creation ==
The Canadian Medical Association Journal (CMAJ) had published a photo of two young girls, one black and the other with hijab; Dr Sherif Emil, a pediatric surgeon, has written a letter to the journal stating:

“Don’t use an instrument of oppression as a symbol of diversity and inclusion […] It has become “liberal” to see the hijab as a symbol of equity, diversity and inclusion. […] But respect does not alter the fact that the hijab, the niqab and the burka are also instruments of oppression for millions of girls and women around the world who are not allowed to make a choice”.

— Dr Sherif Emil, Don’t use an instrument of oppression as a symbol of diversity and inclusion, cmaj.ca

The National Council of Canadian Muslims (NCCM) reacted to Emil’s letter calling it Islamophobic and asked for its immediate retraction. The letter got retracted and the editor of CMAJ apologized for publishing a “wrong, hurtful, and offensive” letter.

This story has created various reactions in Persian Twitter. Masih Alinejad published a tweet and said that in the West criticism against Islam is silenced in the guise of Islamophobia.

“In Iran I was told if I don’t wear hijab, I get kicked out from school, I get jailed, lashes, beaten up, and kicked out from my country. In the West I’m told, sharing my story will cause Islamophobia. I’m a woman from Middle East and I am scared of Islamic ideology. Let us talk”.

— Masih Alinejad, Official Twitter

== Charlie Hebdo’s Article on the Campaign ==
Charlie Hebdo published an article written by Inna Schevchenko supporting the campaign “This is the #MeToo of clothing harassment. Voices of Middle Eastern women living in the West—or not—who had to wear hijab—or still do—are rising. They claim that the Islamic veil is not a harmless trivial garment and even less a freedom for women. Hoping to be heard by some feminists who repeat like a mantra that the veil is a choice”.

== See also ==
- Veil
- Hijab
