= Heraa Hashmi =

Author and activist

- Born: 1997 (age 28–29)
- Known for: Student organizer

Heraa Hashmi (born August 25, 1997) is an Indian American Muslim attorney, author, and activist known as the creator of the Muslims Condemn list which collects instances of Muslims speaking out against bad actions "done falsely in the name of Islam".

== Muslims Condemn ==
Muslims Condemn
- Available in: English
- Website: muslimscondemn.com
- Commercial: No
- Launched: March 2017
- Current status: Defunct

Responding to criticism online, Hashmi, then a 19-year-old student at the university of Colorado, created a 712-page online spreadsheet with specific examples of Muslims condemning terrorist actions. It took three weeks for Hashmi to create the spread sheet after she engaged in a discussion with a classmate asking why Muslims did not "condemn violence when perpetrators committed such acts in the name of Islam." She posted the list to Twitter where it was shared 15,000 times within 24 hours. As of November 2018, the spreadsheet had over 6000 entries and was still available and editable online. With the help of Nigerian developers Ire Aderinokun and Timi Ajiboye, she turned it into a website named Muslims Condemn. The website won her the Yaqeen Institute for Islamic Research's Muhammad Ali Confident Muslim Award in 2017.

=== Content ===
Muslims Condemn was an interactive website containing lists of Muslims who condemn negative things such as terrorism, climate change, discrimination against women, and more. The website was designed to show that Muslims are constantly condemning terrorism and also to demonstrate how ridiculous it is that Muslims are constantly expected to apologise for terrorist acts. Muslims “held to a different standard than other minorities: 1.6 billion people are expected to apologise and condemn [terrorism] on behalf of a couple of dozen lunatics. It makes no sense,” Hashmi said.

== Activism ==
Hashmi sees her faith as complementary to her activism stating "Social justice is a huge part of being a Muslim, but it also doesn't affect the actions I have to take as a Muslim, when it comes to prayer and fasting and going to the pilgrimage."

Hashmi has also been involved in organizing real-life events. These include a 200-person protest at the Denver International Airport following the signing of an executive order by Donald Trump banning citizens of seven primarily Muslim countries from entering the United States, as well as a silent walkout when Ann Coulter came to speak on campus and an interfaith Walk for Unity. In 2017, she was the co-president of the Muslim Student Association at the University of Colorado in Boulder. She is also a contributor for Traversing Tradition, a blog run by a group of young Muslims that strives to provide varied perspectives on modern society through the lenses of Islamic theology, Eastern and Western philosophy, and historical analysis.

== Personal life ==
Hashmi grew up in Superior, Colorado. She was born in Bihar, India. Her parents are of Indian descent. She married in 2019 and later earned her Juris Doctor from the University of California, Davis. She is currently a licensed attorney in California.
