= Why I Am Not a Christian =

Essay by British philosopher Bertrand Russell

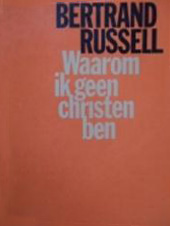
Dutch edition book cover of Why I Am Not a Christian

"Why I Am Not a Christian" is an essay by the British philosopher Bertrand Russell. Originally a talk given on 6 March 1927 at Battersea Town Hall, under the auspices of the South London Branch of the National Secular Society, it was published that year as a pamphlet and has been republished several times in English and in translation.

== Contents ==
Russell questions the morality of religion, which is, in his view, predominantly based on fear.

Russell opens by defining the term 'Christian', rejecting overly broad definitions in favour of two minimal beliefs: that God exists, and that Christ is a supreme moral role-model. He then sets out his reasons for rejecting both of these beliefs, and hence for not labelling himself a Christian.

Russell argues that, although people are usually Christian for emotional reasons or due to their upbringing, it is Catholic dogma that belief in God can be defended by reason alone. Russell then proceeds to attack the main arguments of this kind. The first cause argument is rejected on the grounds that God may not be the first cause or that there may be no first cause at all. The natural law argument is rejected on the grounds that quantum physics produces a probabilistic rather than law-like picture, that the laws are just human descriptions of reality rather than prescriptions (like law in the ordinary sense), and that there is no satisfactory account of God's role as law-giver even if there are such laws. The design argument is rejected on the grounds of evolution and the problem of evil. The moral argument is rejected on the grounds of the Euthyphro dilemma, and a modified version based on the remedying of injustice the non-existence of perfect justice (due to the improbability of an afterlife or similar).

Russell then moves on to Christ, and argues that although some of his teachings are praiseworthy, the balance is such that he is not the supreme moral role-model (in comparison to Socrates or Buddha). Russell expresses doubt in the historicity of Jesus, but suggests that even if the account in the Gospels is accepted in its entirety then Christ is still not worthy of worship. Russell highlights Christ's teachings on turning the other cheek and helping the poor as examples of the praiseworthy kind, but suggests that these are ironically those least often followed by Christians. Russell then cites chiefly Christ's frequent invocations of Hell (but also the stories of the Gadarene swine and the fig-tree) as examples of those teachings that suggest imperfection in both kindness and wisdom.

Russell closes by suggesting that religion is the chief obstacle to moral progress, and an appeal to replace it with science (which can dispel the fear that Russell suggests is the chief cause of all religion) and the moral aim to make the world in which we live a better place.

A good world needs knowledge, kindliness, and courage; it does not need a regretful hankering after the past, or a fettering of the free intelligence by the words uttered long ago by ignorant men. It needs a fearless outlook and a free intelligence. It needs hope for the future, not looking back all the time towards a past that is dead, which we trust will be far surpassed by the future that our intelligence can create.

== History ==
The first German edition was published in 1932 by Kreis der Freunde monistischen Schrifttums, a monist association in Dresden inspired by Ernst Haeckel. In 1957, Paul Edwards preferred Russell over the then more fashionable Ludwig Wittgenstein and published the essay and further texts referring to the background of The Bertrand Russell Case. Russell had been denied a professorship in New York for his political and secular views, tolerance for gay and lesbian behaviour, and support of eugenics, particularly directed towards sterilizing "feeble-minded women". Some countries banned the book, including South Africa. The enhanced version has been republished in various editions since the 1960s. The New York Public Library listed it among the most influential books of the 20th century.
