= Ibn al-Rawandi =

Early skeptic of Islam and a critic of religion in general (827–920 CE)

Ibn Al-Rawandi
- Born: 827 CE; Marw al-Rudh Abbasid Caliphate
- Died: 920 CE
- Other name: Abu al-Hasan Ahmad ibn Yahya ibn Ishaq al-Rawandi
- Occupation: Writer
- Era: Early and Middle Abbasid Era

Abu al-Hasan Ahmad ibn Yahya ibn Ishaq al-Rawandi (Arabic: أبو الحسن أحمد بن يحيى بن إسحاق الراوندي), commonly known as Ibn al-Rawandi (Arabic: ابن الراوندي; 827–920 CE), was a scholar and theologian. In his early days, he was a Mu'tazilite scholar, but then rejected the Mu'tazilite doctrine. Afterwards, he became a Shia scholar; there is some debate about whether he stayed a Shia until his death or became a skeptic, though most sources confirm his eventual rejection of all religion and becoming an atheist.

Although none of his works have survived, his opinions had been preserved through his critics and the surviving books that answered him. His book with the most preserved fragments (through an Ismaili book refuting al-Rawandi's ideology) is the Kitab al-Zumurrud (The Book of the Emerald).

Al-Rawandi is frequently mentioned in classical Islamic literature as one of the zanādiqa, a term referring to individuals who outwardly profess Islam while concealing beliefs that contradict it. He extended his critique to prophethood, though he did not deny the existence of a Creator. The German orientalist Josef van Ess argued that Ibn al-Rawandi's shift did not align with any particular philosophical doctrine, but rather reflected "an individualistic dialectical tendency, motivated initially by personal resentment against the Mu‘tazilites, which later evolved into a broader rejection of religious foundations."

Ibn al-Rawandi is considered an early example of what modern scholarship terms individual atheism or isolated intellectual dissent. Despite his polemical and critical approach, his thought did not give rise to a distinct school or following. Van Ess further noted that Ibn al-Rawandi "remained on the margins of Islamic theological discourse, and his ideas left no significant legacy."

== Life ==
Abu al-Husayn Ahmad bin Yahya ben Isaac al-Rawandi was born in 827 CE in Greater Khorasan, modern-day northwest Afghanistan. Al-Rawandi was born in Basra during the reign of the Abbasid Caliph Al-Ma'mun. His father, Yahya, was a Persian Jewish scholar who converted to Islam and schooled Muslims on refuting the Talmud.

He joined the Mu'tazili of Baghdad and gained prominence among them. However, he eventually became estranged from his fellow Mu'tazilites and formed close alliances with Shia Muslims and then with non-Muslims (Manichaeans, Jews and perhaps also Christians). Al-Rawandi then became a follower of the Manichaean zindiq Abu Isa al-Warraq before eventually rejecting religion in general, writing several books that criticized all religion, particularly Islam.

== Philosophy ==
Most sources agree that he spent time as a Mu'tazilite and a Shia before eventually denouncing all religion. Some sources look for the roots of his views in his connections with Shia Islam and Mu'tazilia, and claim that his heresy was exaggerated by his rivals.

Ibn al-Rawandi spent time as a Mu'tazilite and later a Shia scholar before eventually turning to atheism. He never denied God, rather denounced all religions and criticized the Abrahamic deity. Most of his 114 books have been lost, but those with at least some remaining fragments include The Scandal of the Mu'tazilites (Fadihat al-Mu'tazila), which presents the arguments of various Mu'tazilite theologians and then makes the case that they are internally inconsistent, The Refutation (ad-Damigh), which attacks the Quran, and The Book of the Emerald (Kitab al-Zumurrud) which critiques prophecy and rejects Islam. Among his arguments, he critiques dogma as antithetical to reason, argues miracles are fake, that prophets (including Muhammad) are just magicians, and that the Paradise as described by the Quran is not desirable.

Some scholars also try to account for the more positive view of Ibn al-Rawandi in some Muslim sources. Josef van Ess has suggested an original interpretation that aims at accommodating all the contradictory information. He notes that the sources which portray Ibn al-Rawandi as a heretic are predominantly Mutazilite and stem from Iraq, whereas in eastern texts he appears in a more positive light. As an explanation for this difference, van Ess suggests "a collision of two different intellectual traditions," i.e., those in Iran and in Iraq. He further suggests that Ibn al-Rawandi's notoriety was the result of the fact that after Ibn al-Rawandi left Baghdad, "his colleagues in Baghdad ... profiting from his absence ... could create a black legend." In other words, van Ess believes that Ibn al-Rawandi, although eccentric and disputatious, was not a heretic at all. However, these views are discounted by most scholars given the weight of evidence to the contrary.

== Subjects discussed in the Kitab al-Zumurrud ==
=== Muslim traditions ===
According to the Zumurrud, traditions concerning miracles are inevitably problematic. At the time of the performance of a supposed miracle, only a small number of people could be close enough to the Prophet to observe his deeds. Reports given by such a small number of people cannot be trusted, for such a small group can easily have conspired to lie. The Muslim tradition thus falls into the category of flimsy traditions, those based on a single authority (khabar al-ahad) rather than on multiple authorities (khabar mutawatir). These religious traditions are lies endorsed by conspiracies.

The Zumurrud points out that Muhammad's own presuppositions (wad) and system (qanun) show that religious traditions are not trustworthy. The Jews and Christians say that Jesus really died, but the Qu'ran contradicts them.

Ibn al-Rawandi also points out specific Muslim traditions, and tries to show that they are laughable. The tradition that the angels rallied round to help Muhammad is not logical, because it implies that the angels of Badr were weaklings, able to kill only seventy of the Prophet's enemies. And if the angels were willing to help Muhammad at Badr, where were they at Uhud when their help was so badly needed?

The Zumurrud criticizes prayer, preoccupation with ritual purity, and the ceremonies of the hajj; throwing stones, circumambulating a house that cannot respond to prayers, running between stones that can neither help nor harm. It goes on to ask why Safa and Marwa are venerated and what difference there is between them and any other hill in the vicinity of Mecca, for example, the hill of Abu Qubays, and why the Kaaba is any better than any other house.

From the Encyclopaedia of Islam:

The plentiful extracts from the K. al-Zumurraudh provide a fairly clear indication of the most heterodox doctrine of Ibn al-Rawandi, that of which posterity has been least willing to forgive him: a biting criticism of prophecy in general and of the prophecy of Muhammad in particular; he maintains in addition that religious dogmas are not acceptable to reason and must, therefore, be rejected; the miracles attributed to the Prophets, persons who may reasonably be compared to sorcerers and magicians, are pure invention, and the greatest of the miracles in the eyes of orthodox Muslims, the Quran, gets no better treatment: it is neither a revealed book nor even an inimitable literary masterpiece. In order to cloak his thesis, which attacks the root of all types of religion, Ibn al-Rawandi used the fiction that they were uttered by Brahmans. His reputation as irreligious iconoclast spread in the 4th/10th century beyond the borders of Muslim literature.

== See also ==
- Al-Ma'arri
- Turan Dursun
- Baron d'Holbach
