= The Quest for the Historical Muhammad =

2000 book edited by Ibn Warraq

- Author: Ibn Warraq
- Language: English
- Subject: Historicity of Muhammad
- Genre: Islamic history
- Publisher: Prometheus Books
- Publication date: March 1, 2000
- Publication place: United States
- Media type: Print (hardcover, paperback), E-book
- Pages: 554
- ISBN: 978-1573927871
- OCLC: 468593725

The Quest for the Historical Muhammad (2000) is an anthology of 15 studies examining the origins of Islam and the Quran, edited by Ibn Warraq.

Contributors argue that traditional Islamic accounts of the religion’s history and the origins of the Quran are unreliable or fictitious, and were aimed at forging a religious Arab identity.

== Reception ==
Fred Donner, an American scholar, has criticized the selection of essays, and described it as a "monument to duplicity". He writes that Warraq unduly favors revisionist theories in order to advance "anti-Islam polemic", adding that "this lopsided character makes The Quest for the Historical Muhammad a book that is likely to mislead many an unwary general reader."

Alfons Teipen, a professor of religion at Furman University, criticized the editing: "The two introductory articles ... are one-sided, rather polemical overview[s] of ... scholarship on the life of Muhammad."

Asma Afsaruddin described the book as a "partisan work" and added that Warraq "clearly has an ideological axe to grind". She states that "poor editing, sloppy transliteration, and ad hominem attacks on certain authors...especially Watt, add to the chagrin of the reader", and argued that "Ibn Warraq is not interested in debate; he wants nothing less than wholesale conversion to his point of view within the community of scholars of Islam" and added that his book "needlessly poisons the atmosphere and stymies efforts to engage in honest scholarly discussion".

In his review of the book, As'ad AbuKhalil states that Ibn Warraq collected old writings by Orientalists who have been long discredited, and added that "the more rigid and biased the Orientalists, the better for Warraq".

== See also ==
- Historicity of Muhammad
