= At-Tawba 29 =

Verse of the Quran

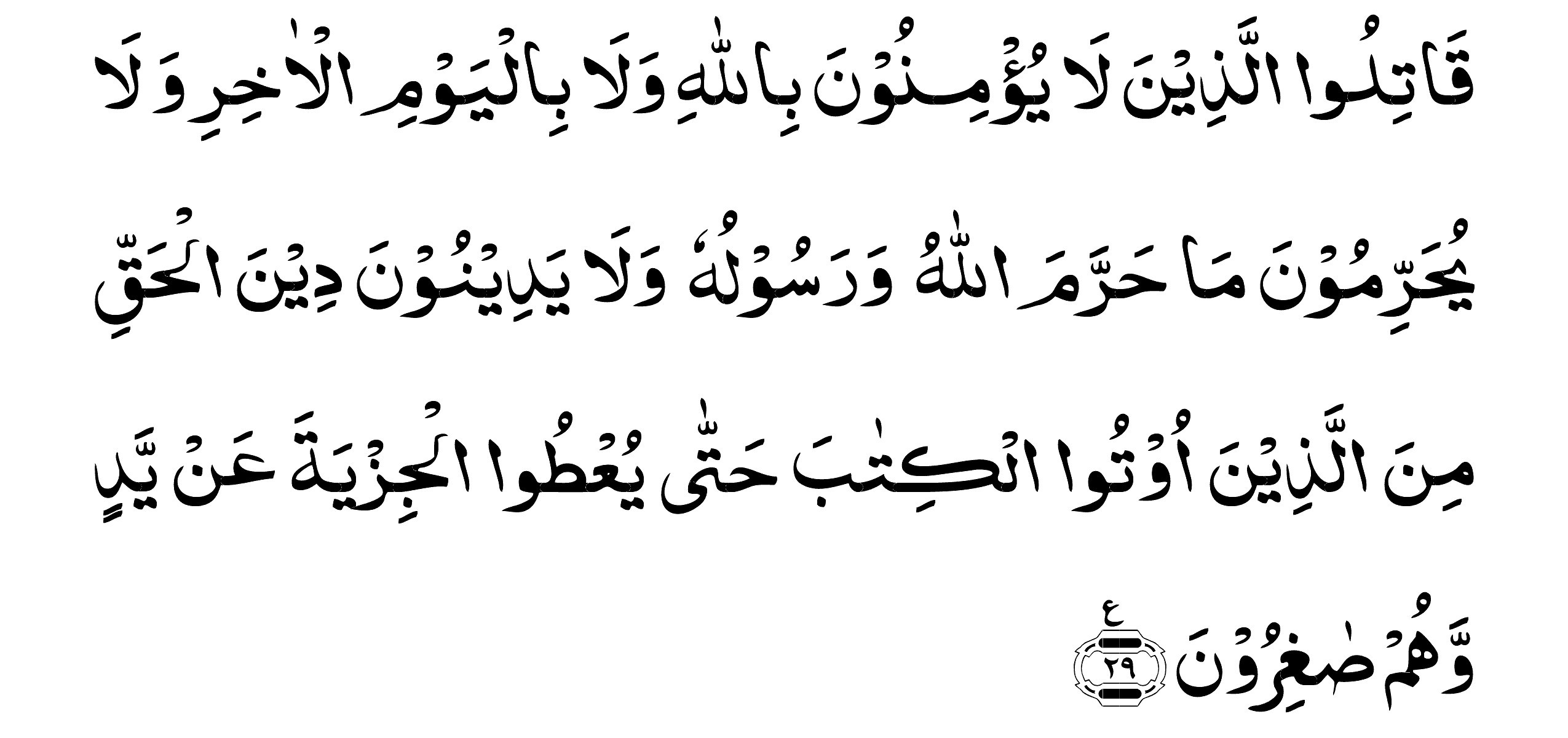
At-Tawbah in Urdu script

Verse 29 of chapter 9 of the Qur'an is notable as dealing with the imposition of tribute (ǧizya) on non-Muslims who have fallen under Muslim rule (the ahl al-ḏimma). Most Muslim commentators believe this verse was revealed at the time of the expedition to Tabuk to threaten the Christians of Arabia in Syria and those of Rome.^{:239-240}

== Text ==
Verse as written in Arabic:

قَـٰتِلُوا۟ ٱلَّذِينَ لَا يُؤْمِنُونَ بِٱللَّهِ وَلَا بِٱلْيَوْمِ ٱلْـَٔاخِرِ وَلَا يُحَرِّمُونَ مَا حَرَّمَ ٱللَّهُ وَرَسُولُهُۥ وَلَا يَدِينُونَ دِينَ ٱلْحَقِّ مِنَ ٱلَّذِينَ أُوتُوا۟ ٱلْكِتَـٰبَ حَتَّىٰ يُعْطُوا۟ ٱلْجِزْيَةَ عَن يَدٍۢ وَهُمْ صَـٰغِرُونَ

English translations of the verse: (Note: There are online repositories of common, published English translations of the Quran. One such repository is quran.com. The text of the English translations quoted in this article may be verified using this repository if the hard copies of those translations are not available to the reader.)

Sahih International: Fight those who do not believe in Allah or in the Last Day and who do not consider unlawful what Allah and His Messenger have made unlawful and who do not adopt the religion of truth from those who were given the Scripture - [fight] until they give the jizyah willingly while they are humbled.

Muhsin Khan: Fight against those who (1) believe not in Allah, (2) nor in the Last Day, (3) nor forbid that which has been forbidden by Allah and His Messenger (4) and those who acknowledge not the religion of truth (i.e. Islam) among the people of the Scripture (Jews and Christians), until they pay the Jizyah with willing submission, and feel themselves subdued.

Pickthall: Fight against such of those who have been given the Scripture as believe not in Allah nor the Last Day, and forbid not that which Allah hath forbidden by His messenger, and follow not the Religion of Truth, until they pay the tribute readily, being brought low.

Yusuf Ali: Fight those who believe not in Allah nor the Last Day, nor hold that forbidden which hath been forbidden by Allah and His Messenger, nor acknowledge the religion of Truth, (even if they are) of the People of the Book, until they pay the Jizya with willing submission, and feel themselves subdued.

Dr. Ghali: Fight the ones who do not believe in Allah nor in the Last Day, and do not prohibit whatever Allah and His Messenger have prohibited, and do not practice (Literally: to have as a religion) the religion of Truth-from among the ones to whom the Book was brought-until they give the tax out of hand (i.e., by a ready money payment, or in token of submission) and have been belittled...

== Interpretations ==
The Muslim jurists and exegetes disagree primarily on two issues in regards to the exegesis and legal judgements on this verse. One issue is of the generality of the command to fight, which some from the early and classical jurists considered to be a universal command against disbelievers in general. The second issue is of how the jizya relates to the belittlement of the Disbelievers, whether that is by virtue of paying the jizya or expressed in the manner in which the jizya is extracted from the dhimmi.

=== Q9:29 in Hadith ===
According to Zayd ibn Thabit, when the Qu'ran was first being compiled, he found the last verses of this Surah in the possession of Abu al-h al-Ansari and no one else. In another account, Ubay ibn Ka'b informed Zayd that Muhammad taught him the end of this sūrah and recited the same verses. Some, like Ibn Hazm, suggested that Abu Khuzayma was the only one to have the last verses in written form, as Zayd and others had memorized them. In a continuum of Surah Al-Anfal, this Surah additionally manages the issues of harmony and war and puts together the subject with respect to the Tabuk Expedition. The Significant Issues, Divine Laws and pieces of Guidance incorporated in this surah are as follows

1. Policy guidelines for Muslims pertaining the mushriks.
2. Instructions to participate in Jihad.
3. Guidelines about hypocrisy, feeble faith, and carelessness.
4. Battle of Tabuk.
5. Foundation of a Dar-ul-Islam (an Islamic state).
6. Stretching out the impact of Islam to abutting nations.
7. Pulverizing the underhandedness of the hypocrites.
8. Setting up the Muslims for a battle in the reason for Islam.

=== General ruling ===
al-Shafi’i, the Imam of the Salaf from the 8th century notably made the judgement that this verse applies on the basis of religion rather than external aggression, and that the payment of the jizya is one of two modes by which a disbelieving man from the religion of the people of the Book can save his blood from being spilled. After mentioning the verse 9:29,

al-Shafi’i commented: So Allah protected the blood of those who follow the religion of the People of the Book either by their conversion into Islam (iman) or by their paying the Jizyah from their hands, while feeling themselves humiliated.

Somewhat anomalously, the modern 19th century Modern Islamic scholar Maududi also includes generally all disbelieving people in this group. Ibn Kathir writes, "Allah the Exalted encourages the believers to fight the polytheists, disbelieving Jews and Christians, who uttered this terrible statement [mentioned in Q9:30] and utter lies against Allah, the Exalted."

Babarti al-Hanafi of the fourteenth century also mentioned this verse and lengthily exposited its contrast to older Quranic verses enjoining peace, forbearance and the prohibition on offensive warfare, then invoked the doctrine of abrogation and emphasised the generality of the targets of war identified by the verse.

Babarti said: ‘If they fight you then fight them’(2:191) indicates that you may only fight the kuffar if they fight you, but it has been abrogated and the explanation is that Allah’s Messenger was initially commanded to forbear and turn away from the polytheists, with His saying, “forbear with a beautiful forbearance, and turn away from the polytheists.” Then He commanded him to call to the religion with admonishment and disputation with goodness, with His saying, “call unto the path of your Lord with wisdom.” Then he was permitted to fight when the initiation was from them, with His saying, “it is permitted for those who fight” and with His saying, “thus, if they fight you, then you fight them.” Then He commanded initiating fighting in some periods of time with His saying, “thus, when the sacred months have passed, fight the polytheists (9:5)”, then He commanded initiating fighting absolutely; in all time periods and places, He said, “and fight them until there be no fitnah(8.39) and ‘fight those who do not believe in Allah and the Last Day’ (9:29)

=== Specific ruling ===
After mentioning the diverse array of interpretations, the influential scholar Al-Rāzī (d. 606/1210) quotes an early exegetical authority, Abū Rawq (d. 140/757), who said that this verse was not a unilateral condemnation of all Jews and Christians, but those "who do not heed the prescriptions contained in the Torah and the Gospel, respectively", while the famous Andalusian scholar al-Qurṭubī (d. 671/1273) "did not read into Qur'ān 9:29 a wholesale denunciation of the People of the Book as an undifferentiated collectivity."^{:278-279}

Modern Pakistani scholar Ghamidi, in line with his general views on Islamic Jihad and Itmam al-Hujjah, limits the application of this verse to only the Muslim Prophet's non-Muslim addresses who lived in his time and region.

Another interpretation is that this verse refers to the Expedition of Tabuk (since this Surah was revealed at that period of time). Therefore, it was referring to the hypocrites of that time. Prophet Muhammed went to the War of Tabuk with an army of 30,000 Muslims. However, after the Roman army from Syria discovered the size of the Muslim army, they decided not to attack (so no battle took place).

O you Prophet, strive (Jihad) against the steadfast disbelievers and the hypocrites, and be harsh with them. And their abode is Hell, and miserable is the Destiny. They swear by Allah that they said nothing, while indeed, they had said the word of infidelity and had disbelieved after having accepted Islam, and had intended what they could not achieve. (9:73-74)

When Muhammed was returning from the Expedition of Tabuk, they intended to kill him and he knew about it, but they were unsuccessful.

Bayhaqi reports that Sayyidina Hudhaifa narrated (hadith):

‘When we were returning from Tabuk, I was leading the camel of the Holy Prophet while Ammar was walking behind. When we approached a valley, I noticed 12 people mounted on conveyances. They were blocking the path. When I informed the Holy Prophet about them, he shouted at them, whereupon they turned and fled.’ He continued, ‘The Holy Prophet asked us if we recognised them. We replied that we did not recognise them because their faces were covered. We added that we had recognised their conveyances.

The Holy Prophet said, ‘They are hypocrites and will remain as such until the day of judgement.’ He then asked us, ‘Do you know what they intended?’ When we replied in the negative, he said, ‘They intended to drop the Messenger of Allah to the bottom of this valley.’

‘We said, ‘why do you not command their tribes to behead each one of them?’ The Holy Prophet replied, ‘I do not want people to say that Muhammad takes people into battle and when Allah grants him victory, he kills the people who went with him. …’"

Believers! Fight against the unbelievers who live around you; and let them find in you sternness. Know that Allah is with the God-fearing. (9:123)
