= Quranic inerrancy =

Doctrine that the Quran is infallible and/or inerrant

Quranic inerrancy is a doctrine central to the Muslim faith that the Quran is the infallible and inerrant word of God as revealed to Muhammad by the archangel Gabriel in the 7th century CE.

== Modernist approach ==
Influenced by Jamal al-Din al-Afghani's modernist interpretations, Muhammad Abduh, Grand Mufti of Egypt, revisited then contemporary Islamic thought with his ijtihad after 1899. According to Rashid Rida's book Tafsir al-Manar the Quran is like a picture of the world that was written by Arabs in the seventh century. He clarified that certain passages concerning witchcraft and the evil eye are merely metaphors for their beliefs. Other verses pertaining to miracles and events mentioned in the Quran are also merely metaphors.

== See also ==
- Attempted imitations of the Quran
- Apostasy in Islam
- Bibliolatry
- Biblical inerrancy
- Cultural Muslim
- Criticism of Islam
- Criticism of Islamism
- Early Quranic manuscripts
- Islamic Modernism
- Qur'anic literalism
