= Herbert Berg (scholar) =

Canadian academic

Herbert Berg is a scholar of religion. Trained at the University of Toronto's Centre for the Study of Religion in the late 1980s and early 1990s, he is currently a Visiting assistant professor of Religious Studies at Rhodes College. He previously taught as a professor in the Department of International Studies and the Department of Philosophy and Religion at the University of North Carolina Wilmington and was the Director of the International Studies from 2011 to 2018. At UNCW, he has been recognized with the University of North Carolina Board of Governor's Award for Excellence in Teaching (2019), the Governor's Award for Excellence for "Outstanding State Government Service" (2013), the Distinguished Faculty Scholar Award (2013), the Board of Trustees Teaching Excellence Award (2012), the Distinguished Teaching Professorship Award (2012), and the Chancellor's Teaching Excellence Award (2006).

Although also recognized as a specialist on the Nation of Islam, Berg's primary work shares much in common with scholars who study the earliest histories of modern religious movements. In this regard, he uses social theory to study the historical sources and context of the early texts of Islam.

== Works by Herbert Berg ==
- Routledge Handbook on Early Islam, edited by Herbert Berg. Routledge, 2017
- New Perspectives on the Nation of Islam, edited by Dawn-Marie Gibson and Herbert Berg. Routledge, 2017.
- Elijah Muhammad. Makers of the Muslim World. Oneworld Publications, 2013.
- Elijah Muhammad and Islam. NYU Press, 2009.
- The Development of Exegesis in Early Islam: The Debate over the Authenticity of Muslim Literature from the Formative Period. Curzon Press, 2000.
  - Chapter 2 translated as "Hadis Tenkîdi" trans. Dilek Tikin and İshak Emin Aktepe, Hadis Tetkikleri Dergisi (Journal of Hadith Studies) 16.2 (2018): 107–167.
- "The Qurʾān: Collection and Canonization", in The Routledge Handbook on Early Islam, edited by Herbert Berg, 37–48. Routledge, 2017.
- "True History in Black and White: Reimagining Origins in the Nation of Islam", in The Routledge Handbook on Early Islam, edited by Herbert Berg, 359–373. Routledge, 2017.
- "Elijah Muhammad’s Prophets: From the White Adam to the Black Jesuses", Mizan: Journal for the Study of Muslim Societies and Civilizations 2.1 (2017)
- "An Asiatic and Moslem Jesus: Deracination and Reracinationg Jesus by Drew Ali", in Islamic Studies Today: Essays in Honor of Andrew Rippin, edited by Majid Daneshgar and Walid Saleh, 277–296. Brill, 2017.
- "The 'School' of Ibn 'Abbās." In The Meaning of the Word: Lexicology and Tafsīr, edited by Stephen Burge, 67–88. Oxford: Oxford University Press in association with the Institute of Ismaili Studies, 2015.
- "Black Muslims." In Routledge Handbook of Islam in the West, edited by Roberto Tottoli, 123–136. Routledge, 2014.
- "The Divine Sources." In The Ashgate Research Companion to Islamic Law, edited by Peri Bearman and Ruud Peters, 27–40. Ashgate Publishing, 2014.
- Review Essay: Muḥammad is Not the Father of Any of Your Men: The Making of the Last Prophet, by David S. Powers. Jerusalem Studies in Arabic and Islam 40 (2013): 363–372.
- "Failures (of Nerve?) in the Study of Islamic Origins." In Failure and Nerve in the Study of Religion: Working with Donald Wiebe, edited by William E. Arnal, Willi Braun, Russell T. McCutcheon, 112–128. Equinox, 2012.
- "The Essence of Essentializing: A Critical Discourse on 'Critical Discourse in the Study of Islam'." Method & Theory in the Study of Religion 24 (2012):337–356.
- "The Needle in the Haystack: Islamic Origins and the Nature of the Early Sources." In The Coming of the Comforter: When, Where, and to Whom? Studies on the Rise of Islam in Memory of John Wansbrough, edited by Basile Lourié, Carlos A. Segovia, Alessandro Bausi, 299–330. Gorgias Press, 2012.
- "Elijah Muhammad’s Redeployment of Muhammad: Racialist and Prophetic Interpretations of the Qur’ān." Transmission and Dynamics of the Textual Sources of Islam: Essays in Honour of Harald Motzki, edited by Nicolet Boekhoff-van der Voort, Kees Versteegh, and Joas Wagemakers, 321–345. Brill, 2011.
- "The Isnād and the Production of Cultural Memory: Ibn 'Abbās as a Case Study." Numen 58 (2011): 259–283.
- "Abbasid Historians' Portrayals of al-'Abbās b. 'Abd al-Muttalib." Abbasid Studies II: Occasional Papers of the School of Abbasid Studies, Leuven, 28 June – 1 July 2004, edited by John Nawas, 13–38. Peeters Publishers, 2010.
- with Sarah Rollens. "The Historical Muhammad and the Historical Jesus: A Comparison of Scholarly Reinventions and Reinterpretations." Studies in Religion / Sciences Religieuses, 32.2 (2008): 271–292.
- "Early African American Muslim Movements and the Qur’an." Journal of Qur’anic Studies, 8.1 (2006): 22–37.
  - Reprinted as "Wczesne ruchy afroamerykańskich muzułmanów i Qur’an", translated by Julian Jeliński, in Nowoczesność Europa islam, edited by Selim Chazbijewicz, Mariusz Turowski, and Karolina Skarbek (Warsaw: Instytut Studiów nad Islamem, 2012): 283–295.
- "Context: Muhammad." Blackwell Companion to the Qur’ān, edited by Andrew Rippin, 187–204. Blackwell, 2006.
  - Reprinted in The Wiley Blackwell Companion to the Qurʾān, 2nd edition, edited by Andrew Rippin and Jawid Mojaddedi (Malden: Wiley Blackwell Publishing, 2017): 200 –217
- "Mythmaking in the African American Muslim Context: The Moorish Science Temple, the Nation of Islam, and the Muslim Society of America." Journal of the American Academy of Religion, 73.3 (2005): 685–703.
  - Reprinted in Islam and Modernity edited by Nasar Meer. Routledge, 2017.
  - Reprinted as "Mitotwórstwo w kontekście afroamerykańskich ruchów muzułmańskich: Mauryjska Świątynia Wiedzy, Naród Islamu i Amerykańskie Stowarzyszenie Muzułmanów", translated by Julian Jeliński, in Nowoczesność Europa islam, edited by Selim Chazbijewicz, Mariusz Turowski, and Karolina Skarbek (Warsaw: Instytut Studiów nad Islamem, 2012): 267–281
- "Ibn 'Abbās in 'Abbāsid-Era Tafsīr." Abbasid Studies: Occasional Papers of the School of Abbasid Studies, Cambridge 6–10 July 2002, edited by James E. Montgomery, 129–146. Peeters, 2004.
  - Reprinted in Tafsīr: Interpreting the Qurʾān edited by Mustafa Shah (London: Routledge, 2013): 492–508
- "Competing Paradigms in the Study of Islamic Origins: Qur’ān 15:89-91 and the Value of Isnāds." Method and Theory in the Study of Islamic Origins, edited by Herbert Berg, 259–290. Brill, 2003.
- "Weaknesses in the Arguments for the Early Dating of tafsīr." With Reverence for the Word: Medieval Scriptural Exegesis in Judaism, Christianity, and Islam, edited by Jane Dammen McAuliffe, Barry D. Walfish, and Joseph W. Goering, 329–345. Oxford University Press, 2003.
- The Development of Exegesis in Early Islam: The Debate over the Authenticity of Muslim Literature from the Formative Period. Routledge/Curzon, 2000.
- "Elijah Muhammad and the Qur’ān: The Evolution of His Tafsīr." Muslim World 89 (1999): 42–55.
- "Elijah Muhammad: An African American Muslim mufassir?" Arabica: Revue d’études Arabes 45 (1998): 320–46.
- "The Implications of, and Opposition to, the Methods and Theories of John Wansbrough." Method & Theory in the Study of Religion 9.1 (1997): 3–22. Reprinted in The Quest for the Historical Muhammad, edited by Ibn Warraq, 489–509. Prometheus Books, 2000.
  - Reprinted in Method and Theory in the Study of Religion: Twenty Five Years On, edited by Aaron W. Hughes (Leiden: Brill, 2013): 209–277.
  - Reprinted in The Quest for the Historical Muhammad, edited by Ibn Warraq (Amherst: Prometheus Books, 2000): 489–509.
- "Tabarī’s Exegesis of the Qur’ānic Term al-kitāb." Journal of the American Academy of Religion 63.4 (1995): 761–774.

== See also ==
- List of contemporary Muslim scholars of Islam
